= List of the Mesozoic life of California =

This list of the Mesozoic life of California contains the various prehistoric life-forms whose fossilized remains have been reported from within the US state of California and are between 252.17 and 66 million years of age.

== A ==
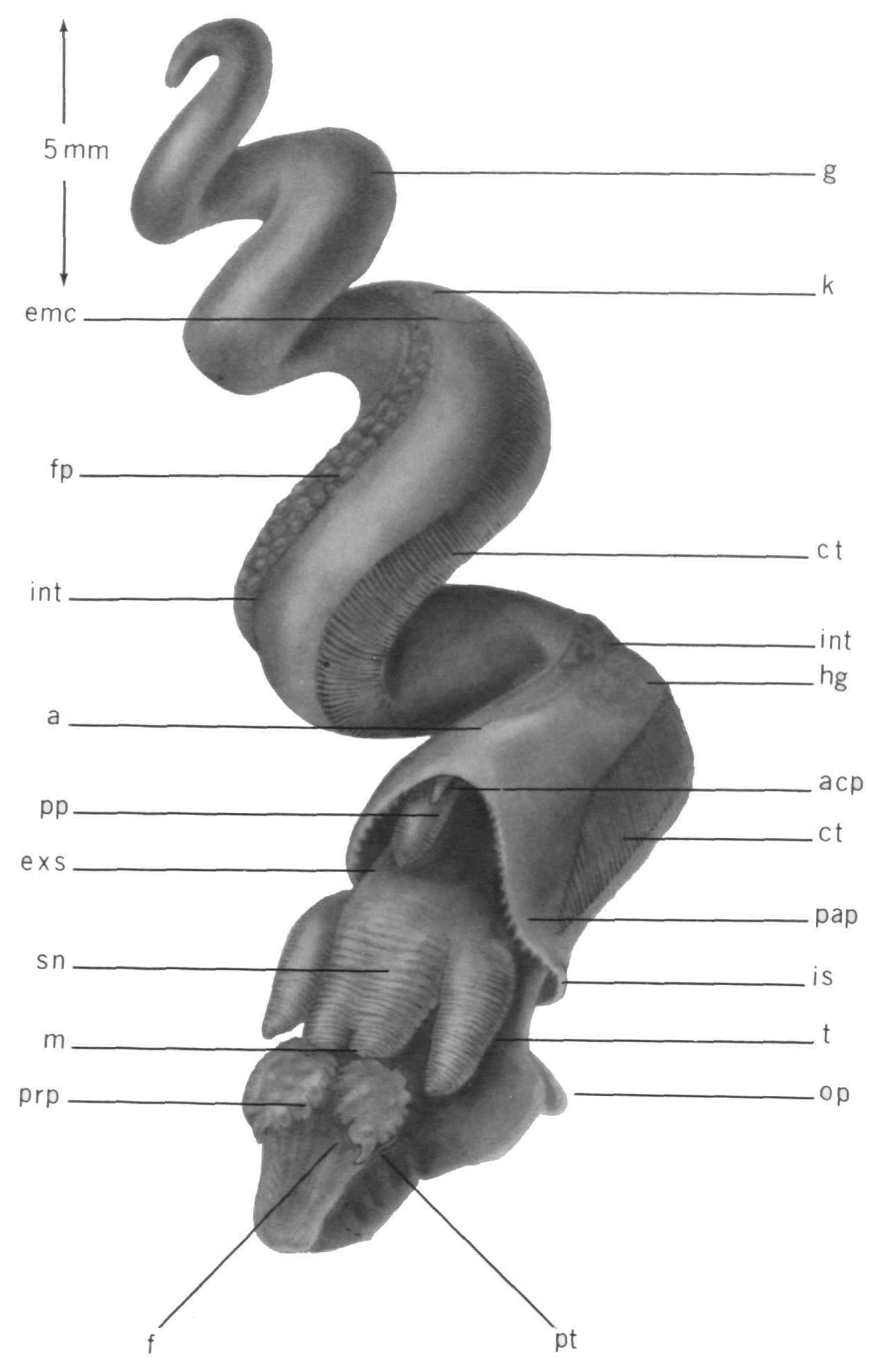
- Diagram depicting the soft part anatomy of the sea snail Abyssochrysos
  †Abyssochrysos – tentative report
  - †Abyssochrysos giganteum – type locality for species
- †Acaeniotyle
  - †Acaeniotyle umbilicata – or unidentified related form
- †Acanthoceras
  - †Acanthoceras rhotomagense – or unidentified related form
  - †Acanthoceras roguense – or unidentified related form
  - †Acanthoceras sherborni – or unidentified comparable form
- †Acanthocircus
  - †Acanthocircus aculeatus
  - †Acanthocircus carinatus – or unidentified related form
  - †Acanthocircus dendroacanthos
  - †Acanthocircus dicranocanthos
  - †Acanthocircus meyerhofforum
  - †Acanthocircus multidentatus
  - †Acanthocircus polymorphus
  - †Acanthocircus suboblongus
  - †Acanthocircus trizonalis
- Acanthosphaera – tentative report
  - †Acanthosphaera lucida
- †Acastea
  - †Acastea acer
  - †Acastea bipes
  - †Acastea dura
  - †Acastea incontraria
  - †Acastea remusa
  - †Acastea tenuis
- Acesta
- Acharax
  - †Acharax stantoni
- Acila
  - †Acila demessa
  - †Acila princeps
- †Acrioceras
  - †Acrioceras hamlini
  - †Acrioceras vespertinum
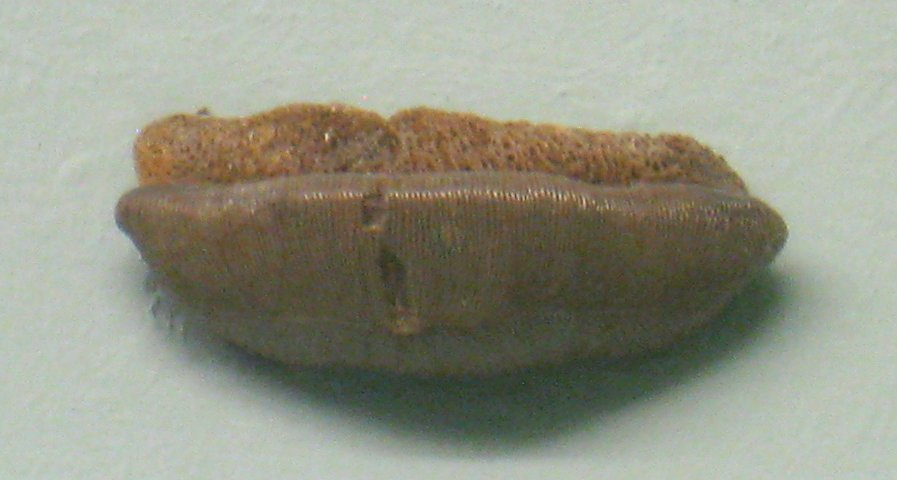
- Fossilized teeth of the Permian-Paleocene cartilaginous fish Acrodus
  †Acrodus
  - †Acrodus wempliae – type locality for species
- †Acteon
  - †Acteon inornatus
  - †Acteon politus
  - †Acteon sullivanae
- †Acteonella
  - †Acteonella oviformis
- †Acteonina
  - †Acteonina berryessensis – type locality for species
  - †Acteonina californica
  - †Acteonina columnaris
- †Acusten
  - †Acusten ordinarius
- †Adelodonax
  - †Adelodonax altus
- †Aechmella
- †Agnomyax
  - †Agnomyax monilifer
- †Aguileria – or unidentified comparable form
- †Alarimella
  - †Alarimella anae – type locality for species
  - †Alarimella veta
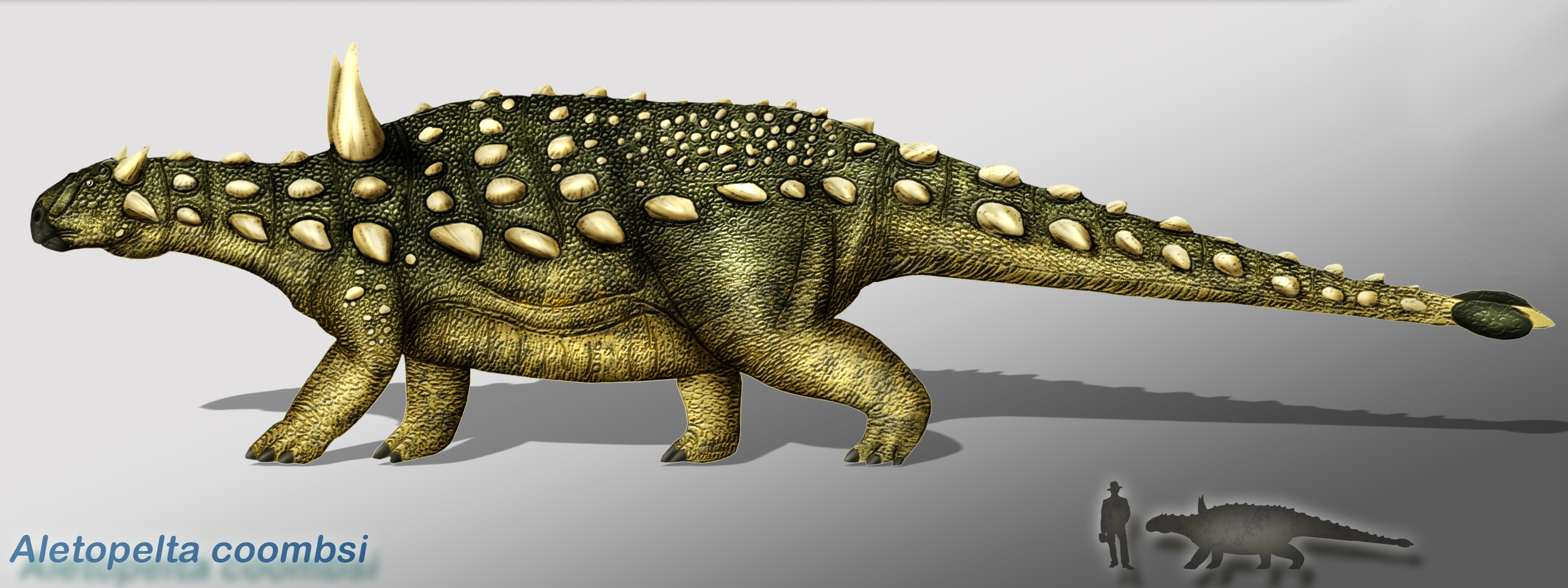
- Life restoration of the Late Cretaceous armored dinosaur Aletopelta
  †Aletopelta – type locality for genus
  - †Aletopelta coombsi – type locality for species
- †Alievium
  - †Alievium antiquum
- Amauropsis
  - †Amauropsis pseudoalveata
- †Ambercyclus
  - †Ambercyclus dilleri
  - †Ambercyclus morganensis
- †Amphidonte
  - †Amphidonte parasitica
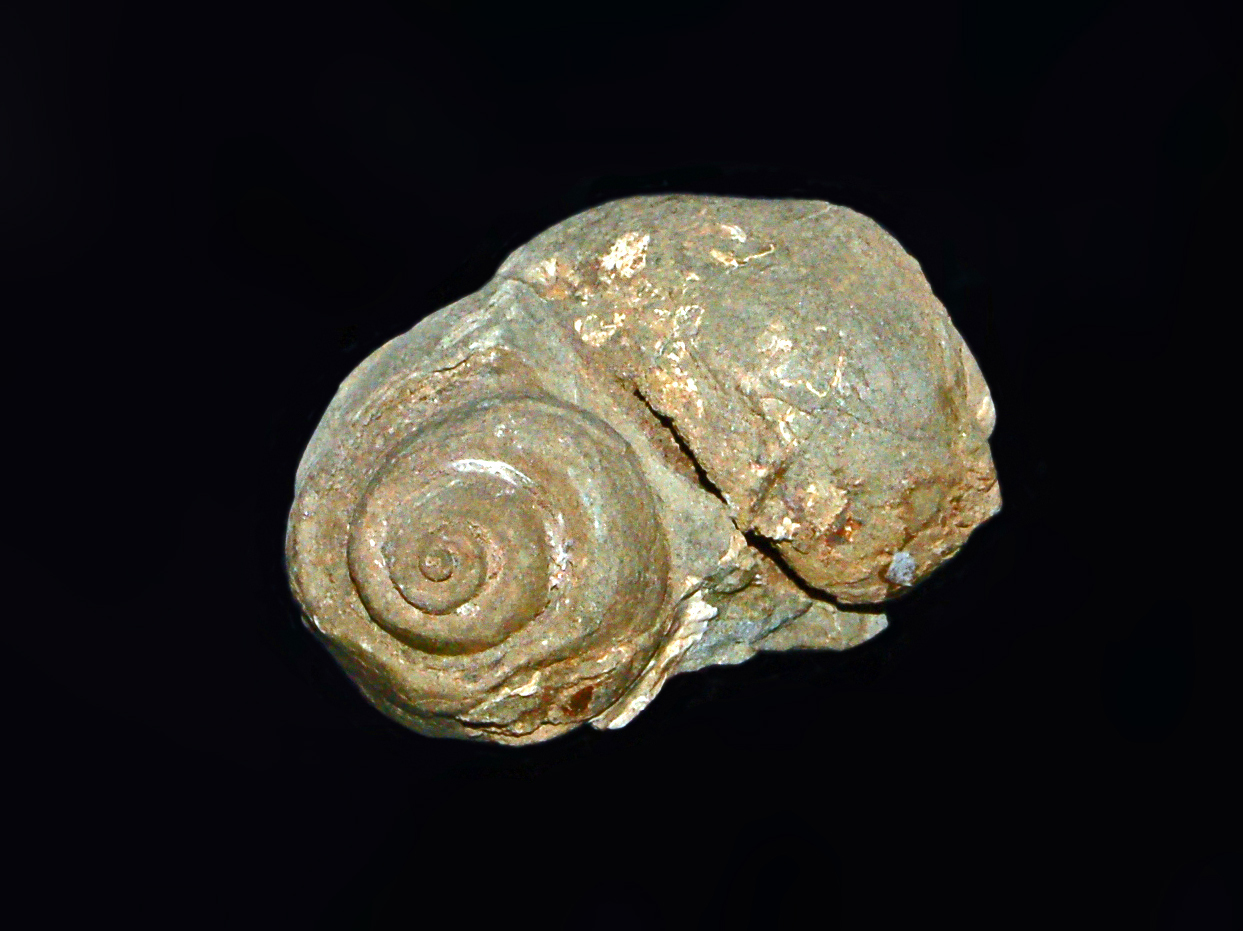
- Fossilized shell of the Jurassic-Miocene sea snail Ampullina
  †Ampullina
  - †Ampullina avellana
  - †Ampullina concipio
  - †Ampullina mona
  - †Ampullina oviformis
  - †Ampullina packardi
  - †Ampullina stantoni
- Amuletum
- †Anagaudryceras
  - †Anagaudryceras mikobokense
  - †Anagaudryceras sacya – or unidentified comparable form
- †Anahamulina
  - †Anahamulina wilcoxensis
- †Anarhynchia
  - †Anarhynchia gabbi – or unidentified comparable form
- †Anasibirites
  - †Anasibirites desertorum
  - †Anasibirites kingianus – type locality for species
  - †Anasibirites lindgreni
- †Anatomites
  - †Anatomites adalberti
  - †Anatomites damesi
  - †Anatomites edgari
  - †Anatomites externiplicatus
  - †Anatomites intermittens
  - †Anatomites konnincki
  - †Anatomites mendenhalli
  - †Anatomites obsoletus – type locality for species
  - †Anatomites shastensis – type locality for species
  - †Anatomites subintermittens – type locality for species
- †Anatropites
  - †Anatropites hauchecornei
- †Anchura
  - †Anchura ainikta – type locality for species
  - †Anchura baptos – type locality for species
  - †Anchura californica
  - †Anchura callosa
  - †Anchura condoniana
  - †Anchura falciformis
  - †Anchura gibbera
  - †Anchura halberdopsis – type locality for species
  - †Anchura phaba – type locality for species
- †Anglonautilus
  - †Anglonautilus catarinae
- †Angulobracchia
  - †Angulobracchia bulbosa
  - †Angulobracchia jasperensis
  - †Angulobracchia ozvoldovae
  - †Angulobracchia purisimaensis
- †Anisoceras
  - †Anisoceras draconum
- †Anisomyon
  - †Anisomyon meeki
- †Anomalina
  - †Anomalina pseudopopillosa
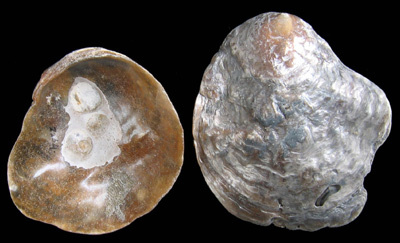
- Interior and exterior of a shell of an Anomia, or jingle shell
  †Anomia
  - †Anomia – type locality for species A – informal
  - †Anomia jalama
  - †Anomia lineata
- †Anoplophora – tentative report
  - †Anoplophora shastensis – type locality for species
- †Anthonya
  - †Anthonya cultriformis
- †Aphaea
  - †Aphaea ignota
- †Aphanoptyxis
  - †Aphanoptyxis andersoni
  - †Aphanoptyxis californica – type locality for species
- †Aphrodina
  - †Aphrodina varians
- †Aphrosaurus
  - †Aphrosaurus furlongi
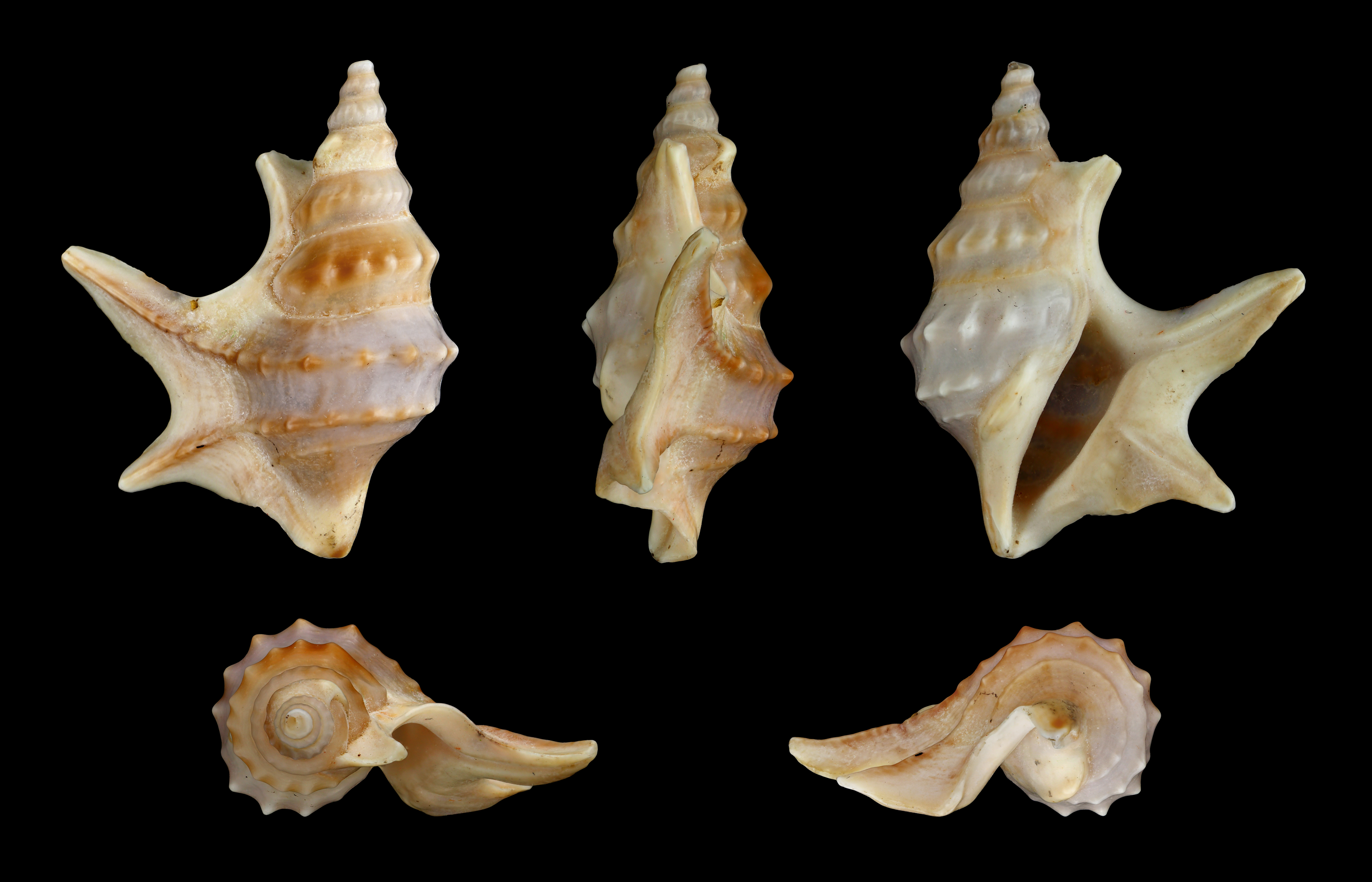
- Multiple views of a shell of an Aporrhais pelican foot sea snail
  Aporrhais
  - †Aporrhais veta – type locality for species
- †Archaeocenosphaera
  - †Archaeocenosphaera ruesti – or unidentified related form
- †Archaeodictyomitra
  - †Archaeodictyomitra apiarium
  - †Archaeodictyomitra inornata
  - †Archaeodictyomitra oleadita
  - †Archaeodictyomitra rigida
  - †Archaeodictyomitra simplex
  - †Archaeodictyomitra siplex
  - †Archaeodictyomitra sliteri
  - †Archaeodictyomitra vulgaris
- †Archaeohagiastrum
  - †Archaeohagiastrum minutum – or unidentified related form
- Archaeolithothamnium
- †Archaeopus
  - †Archaeopus antennatus
- †Archaeospongoprunum
  - †Archaeospongoprunum carrierensis
  - †Archaeospongoprunum cortinaensis
  - †Archaeospongoprunum elegans – or unidentified related form
  - †Archaeospongoprunum imlayi
  - †Archaeospongoprunum klingi
  - †Archaeospongoprunum macrostylum – or unidentified related form
  - †Archaeospongoprunum praeimlayi
  - †Archaeospongoprunum praelongum
  - †Archaeospongoprunum tehamaensis
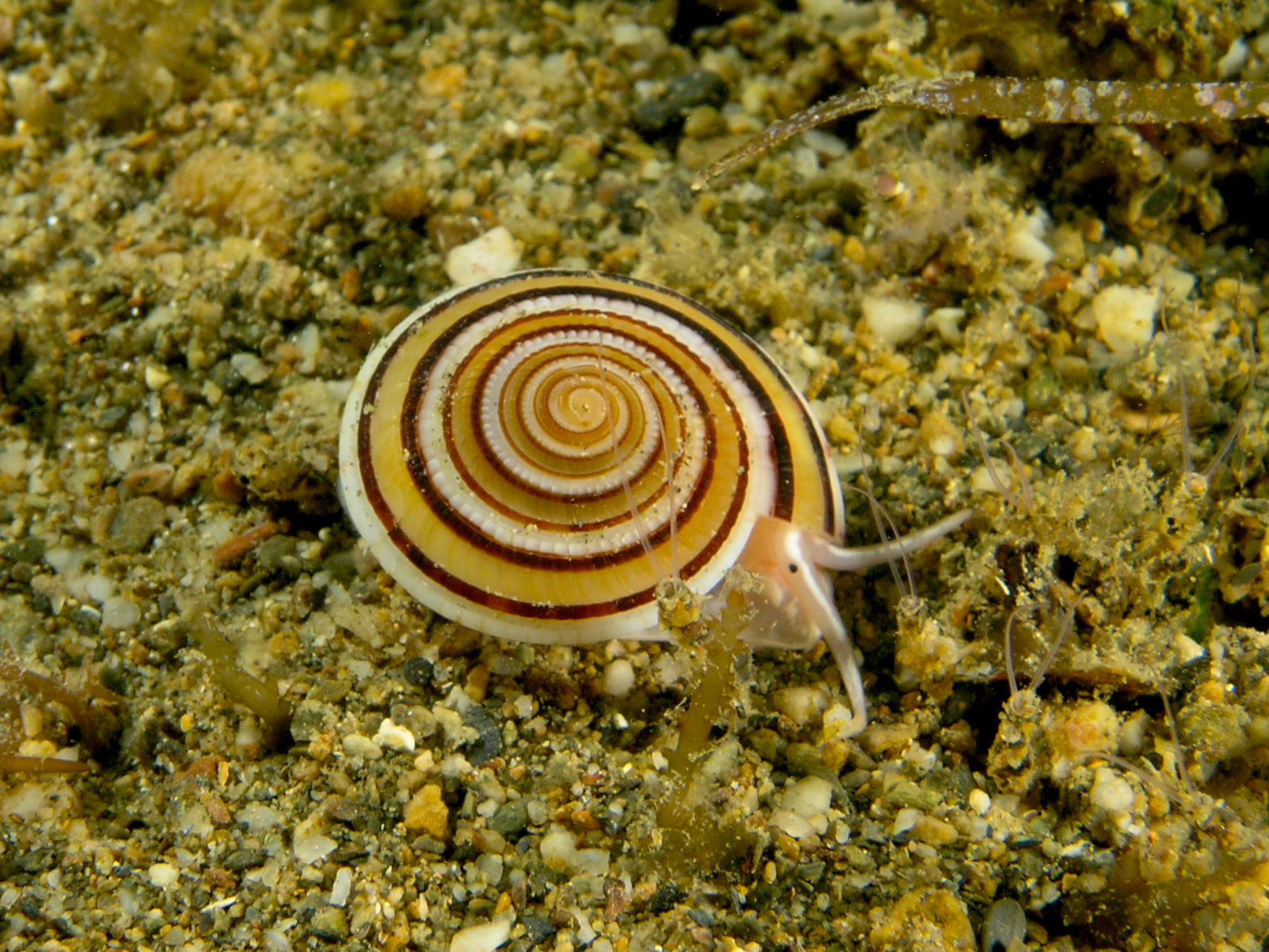
- A living Architectonica staircase shell sea snail
  Architectonica – tentative report
- Arcopagia
  - †Arcopagia tehama
- Arctica
  - †Arctica anthracocola
  - †Arctica denmanensis – or unidentified related form
- †Arctoceras
  - †Arctoceras tuberculatum
- †Areaseris
  - †Areaseris nevadensis
- Argyrotheca
  - †Argyrotheca retrorsa – type locality for species
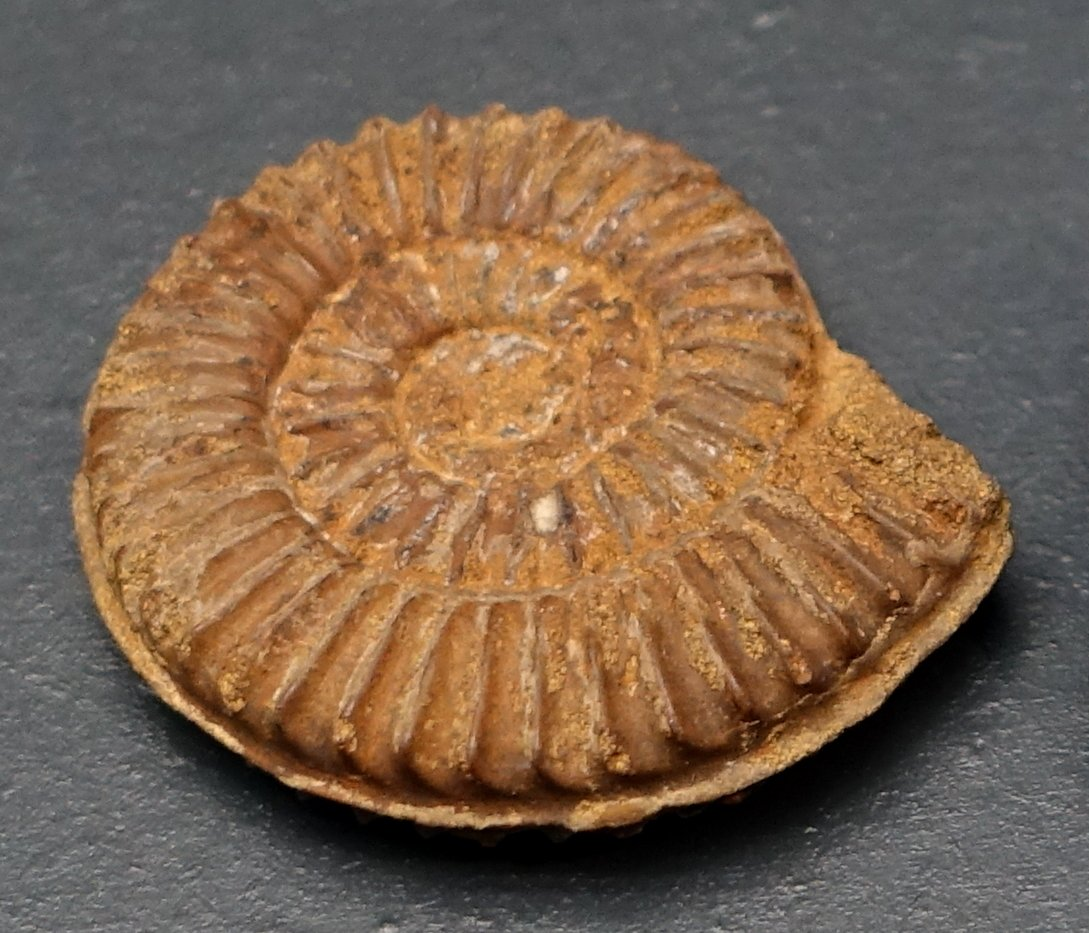
- Fossilized shell of the Early Jurassic ammonoid cephalopod Arnioceras
  †Arnioceras
- †Arpadites
  - †Arpadites kingi – type locality for species
- Arrhoges
  - †Arrhoges californicus
- †Aspenites – type locality for genus
  - †Aspenites acutus
- Astarte
  - †Astarte sulcata – tentative report
  - †Astarte sulcuta
  - †Astarte tuscana
- †Asteroceras
- †Astrocoenia – report made of unidentified related form or using admittedly obsolete nomenclature
- Ataphrus
  - †Ataphrus compactus – tentative report
- †Atira
- †Atractites
  - †Atractites philippii – type locality for species
- †Atresius
  - †Atresius liratus
- †Aucellina – tentative report
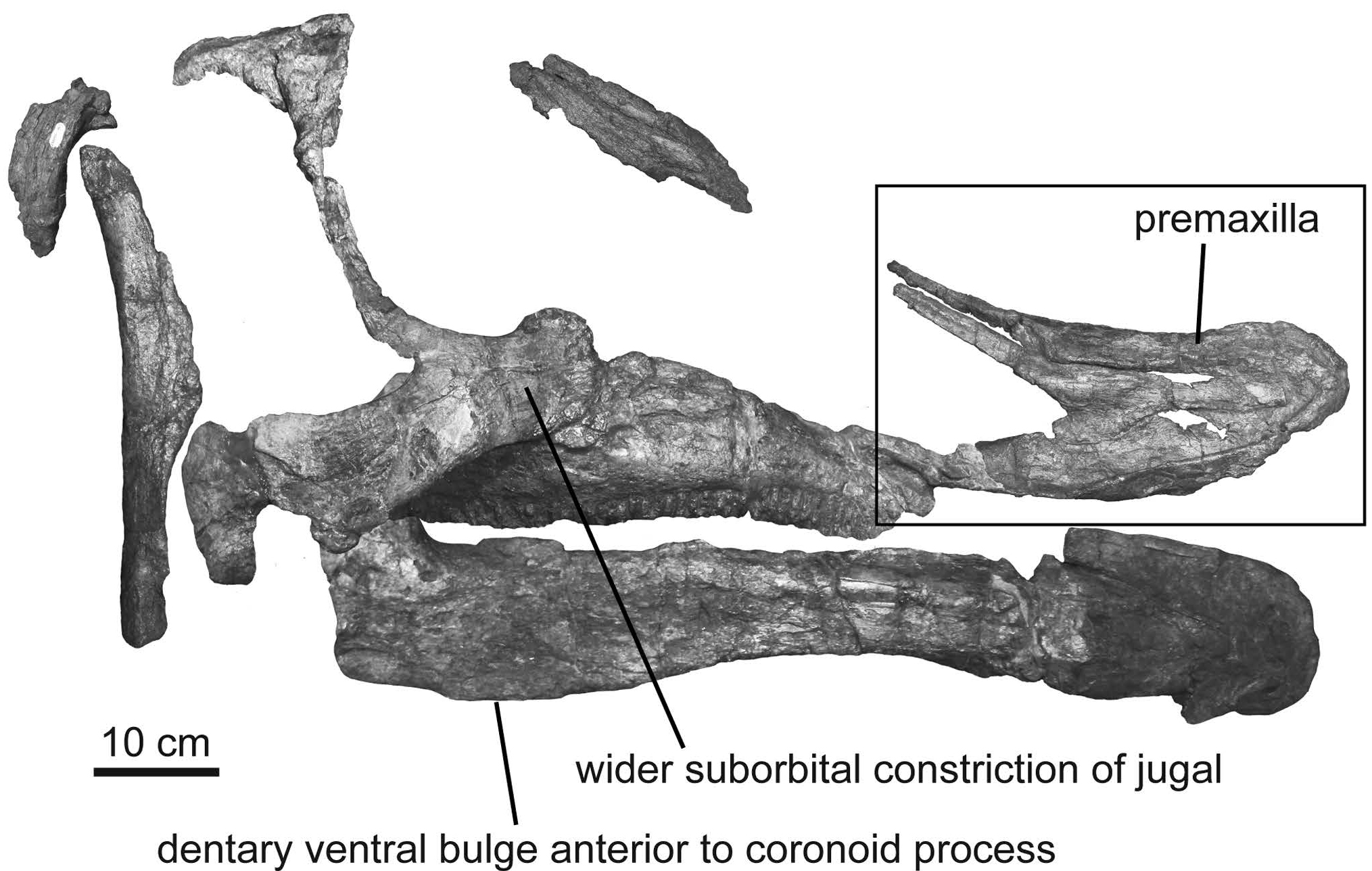
- Fossilized partial skull of the Late Cretaceous duck-billed dinosaur Augustynolophus
  †Augustynolophus
  - †Augustynolophus morrisi
- Avicula
  - †Avicula mucronata – type locality for species
  - †Avicula soperi – type locality for species
- †Axonoceras

== B ==
- †Bacchites
  - †Bacchites hyatti – type locality for species
  - †Bacchites pinguis
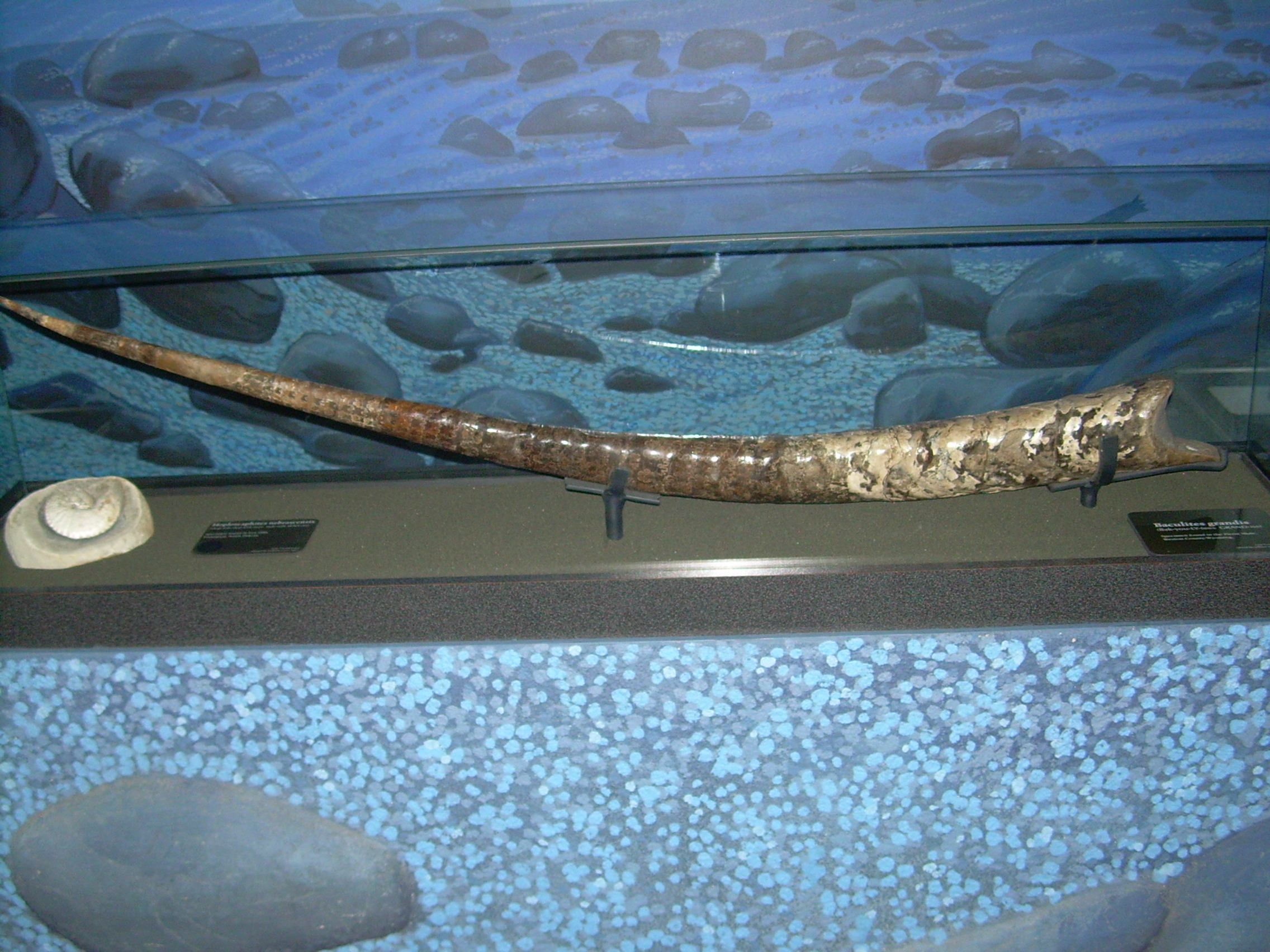
- Fossilized shell of the Late Cretaceous ammonoid cephalopod Baculites
  †Baculites
  - †Baculites anceps
  - †Baculites bailyi – or unidentified comparable form
  - †Baculites buttensis – type locality for species
  - †Baculites capensis
  - †Baculites chicoensis
  - †Baculites fairbanksi
  - †Baculites inornatus
  - †Baculites lomaensis
  - †Baculites occidentalis
  - †Baculites recta – or unidentified comparable form
  - †Baculites rex – type locality for species
  - †Baculites schencki – type locality for species
  - †Baculites yokoyamai – or unidentified comparable form
- †Bagotum
  - †Bagotum modestum
- †Balantiostoma – tentative report
- Barbatia
- †Barrettia
  - †Barrettia sparcilirata
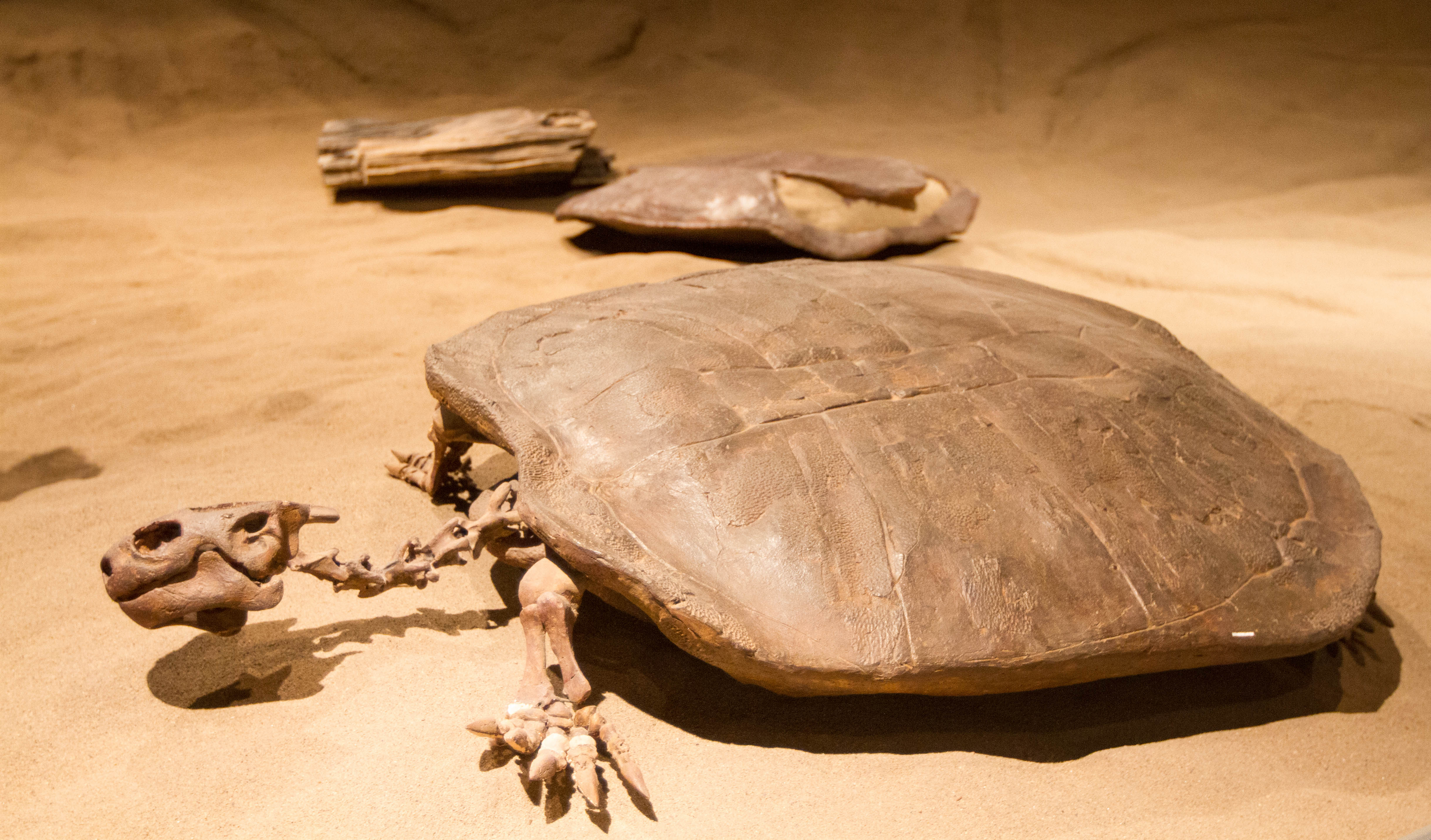
- Mounted fossilized skeleton of the Cretaceous turtle Basilemys
  †Basilemys
- †Bathypurpurinopsis
  - †Bathypurpurinopsis stantoni – type locality for species
- † Belleza
  - †Belleza decora
- †Belliscala
  - †Belliscala meta
- Bernaya
  - †Bernaya argonautica – type locality for species
  - †Bernaya berryessae – type locality for species
  - †Bernaya crawfordcatei – type locality for species
  - †Bernaya gualalaensis – type locality for species
  - †Bernaya jeanae – type locality for species
  - †Bernaya kayei – or unidentified related form
  - †Bernaya louellasaulae – type locality for species
  - †Bernaya popenoei – type locality for species
  - †Bernaya rineyi – type locality for species
- †Bernoullius
  - †Bernoullius brokenkettlensis
  - †Bernoullius cristatus
  - †Bernoullius delnortensis
  - †Bernoullius dicera
  - †Bernoullius irwini
- †Beudanticeras
  - †Beudanticeras alamoense – type locality for species
  - †Beudanticeras argonauticum – type locality for species
  - †Beudanticeras breweri
  - †Beudanticeras brewerii – or unidentified related form
  - †Beudanticeras haydeni
- †Bipedis – tentative report
- †Biplica
  - †Biplica heteroplicata
  - †Biplica isoplicata
  - †Biplica michaeli – or unidentified related form
  - †Biplica miniplicata
  - †Biplica multiplicata
  - †Biplica obliqua
- †Bistarkum
- †Bittiscala
- †Bivallupus
  - †Bivallupus mexicanus
- †Bochianites
  - †Bochianites paskentaensis
- †Bolena
  - †Bolena zancajosa
- †Bositra
  - †Bositra buchi
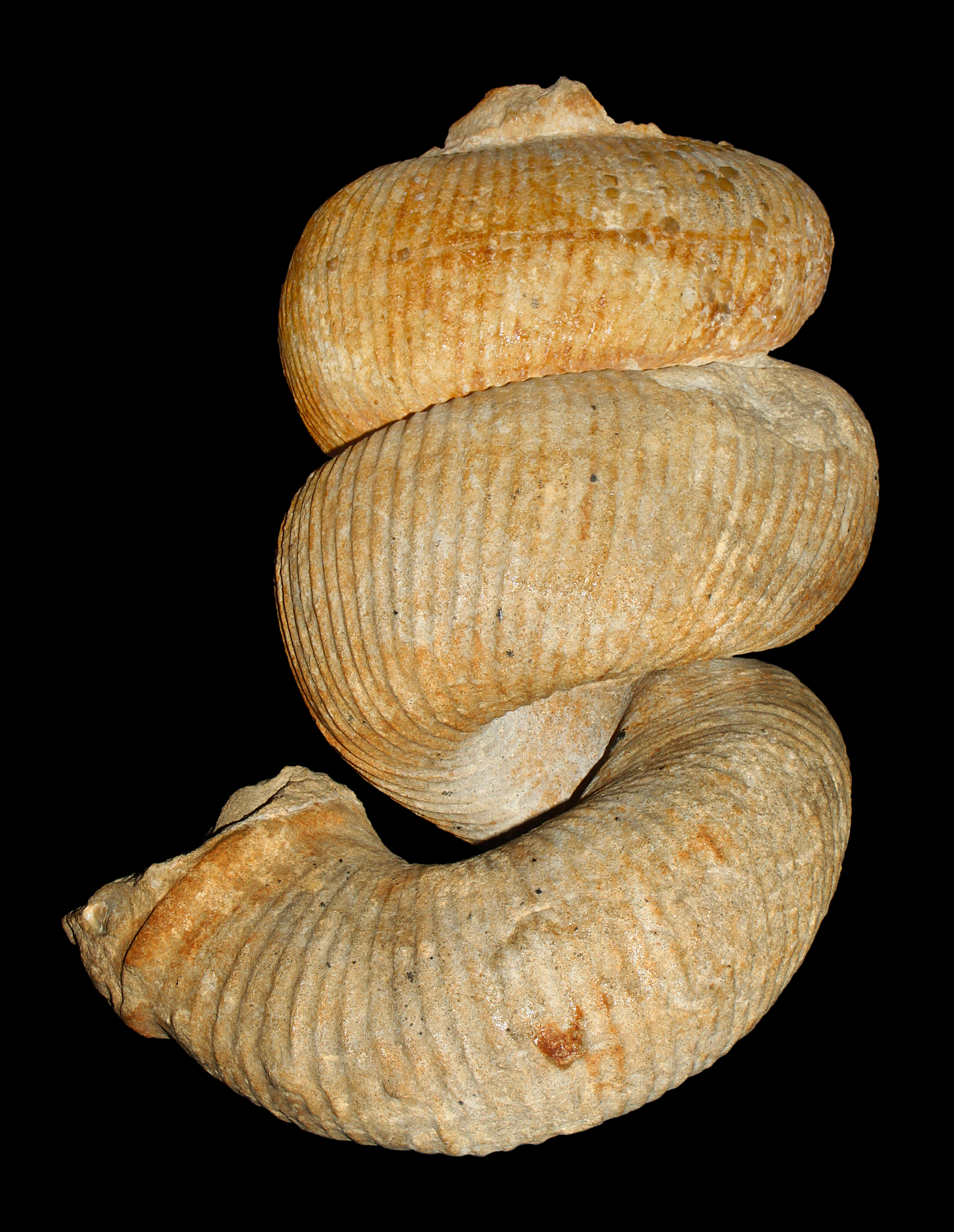
- Fossilized shell of the Late Cretaceous ammonoid cephalopod Bostrychoceras
  †Bostrychoceras
  - †Bostrychoceras brewerii
  - †Bostrychoceras californicum – type locality for species
  - †Bostrychoceras declive
  - †Bostrychoceras occidentale – type locality for species
  - †Bostrychoceras otsukai – or unidentified related form
- †Brancoceras
  - †Brancoceras parvum
- †Brasilichnium
- †Buchia
  - †Buchia concentrica – or unidentified comparable form
  - †Buchia elderensis
  - †Buchia keyserlingi
  - †Buchia pacifica
  - †Buchia piochii
  - †Buchia terebratuloides
  - †Buchia trigonoides
- †Bulbificopsis – type locality for genus
  - †Bulbificopsis garza – type locality for species
- Bulimina
  - †Bulimina obtusa
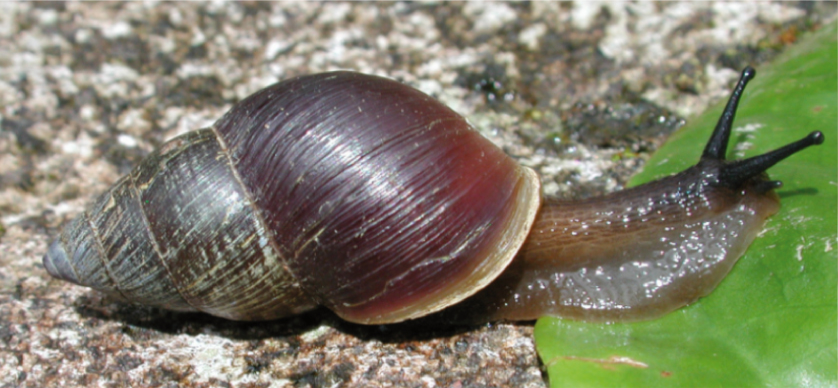
- A living Bulimulus land snail
  Bulimulus
- †Bullamirifica
  - †Bullamirifica ainiktos
  - †Bullamirifica elegans
- Bullaria
  - †Bullaria nortonensis
- Bullina
  - †Bullina yoloensis – type locality for species
- †Butticeras
  - †Butticeras studleyi – type locality for species

== C ==
- †Califadesma
  - †Califadesma elaphium
- †Californigonia – type locality for genus
  - †Californigonia plumasensis – type locality for species. Formerly classified as Trigonia plumasensis.
- †Californites – type locality for genus
  - †Californites careyi – type locality for species
  - †Californites merriami – type locality for species
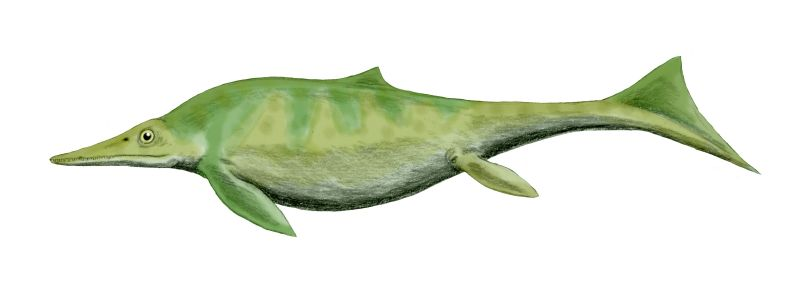
- Restoration of the Late Triassic ichthyosaur Californosaurus
  †Californosaurus
- Callianassa – tentative report
- †Calliconites
  - †Calliconites drakei – type locality for species
- †Calliomphalus – tentative report
- Callista – tentative report
  - †Callista pseudoplana – or unidentified related form
  - †Callista subtrigona
- †Callistalox
  - †Callistalox fragilis
- †Calva
  - †Calva crassa
  - †Calva elderi
  - †Calva nitida
  - †Calva peninsularis
  - †Calva spissa
  - †Calva taffi
  - †Calva varians
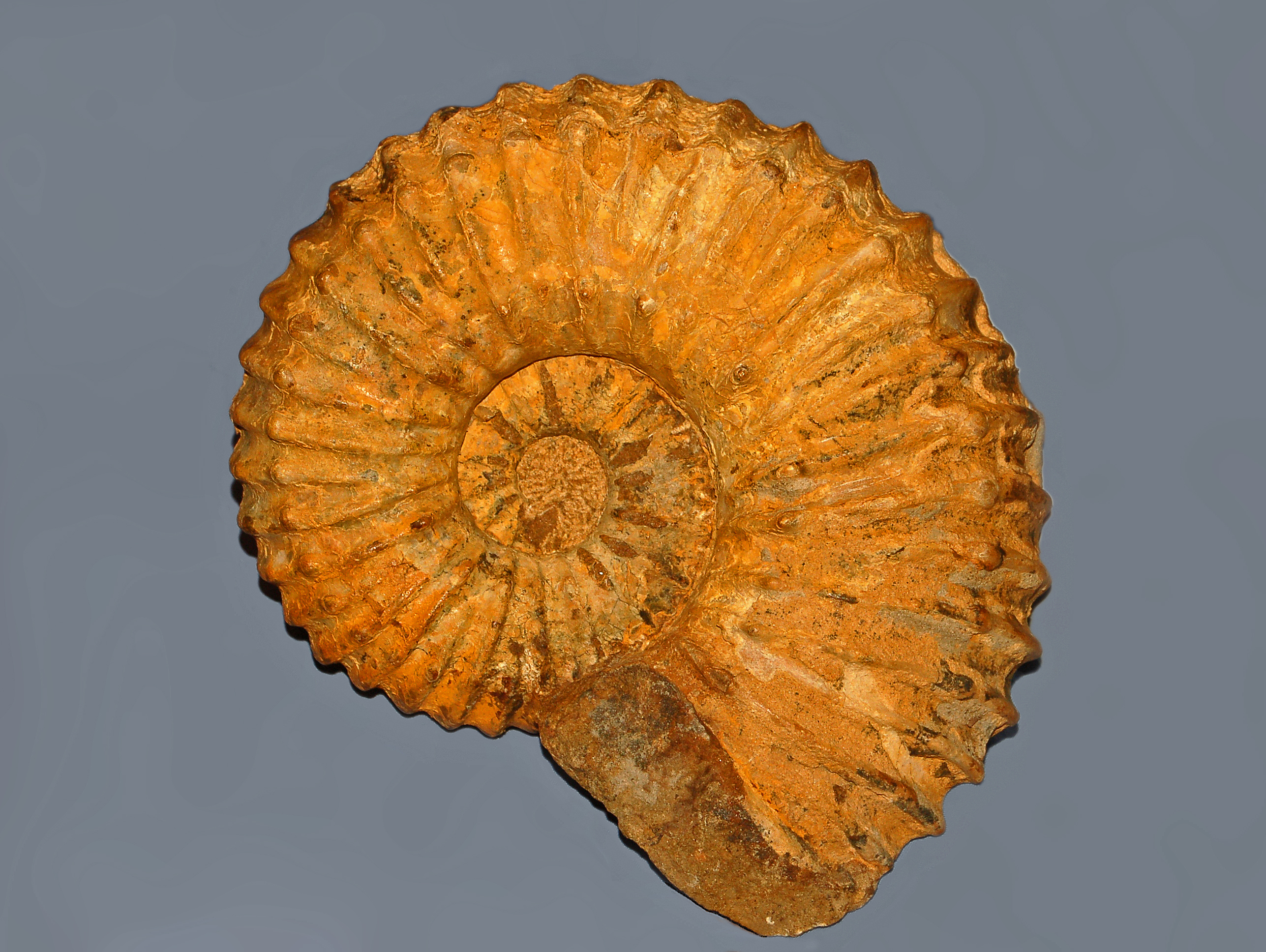
- Fossilized shell of the Late Cretaceous ammonoid cephalopod Calycoceras
  †Calycoceras
  - †Calycoceras naviculare
- †Camptonectes
  - †Camptonectes curvatus – or unidentified comparable form
- †Canadoceras
  - †Canadoceras celeste – type locality for species
  - †Canadoceras fraternum
  - †Canadoceras mysticum
  - †Canadoceras newberryanum
  - †Canadoceras subtilobatum – or unidentified related form
- Cancellaria – tentative report
- †Canelonus
  - †Canelonus conus
- †Caneta
  - †Caneta hsui
- †Canoptum
  - †Canoptum anulatum
  - †Canoptum poissoni
  - †Canoptum rugosum
- Cantharus
  - †Cantharus occidentalis
- †Canutus
  - †Canutus giganteus
  - †Canutus rockfishensis
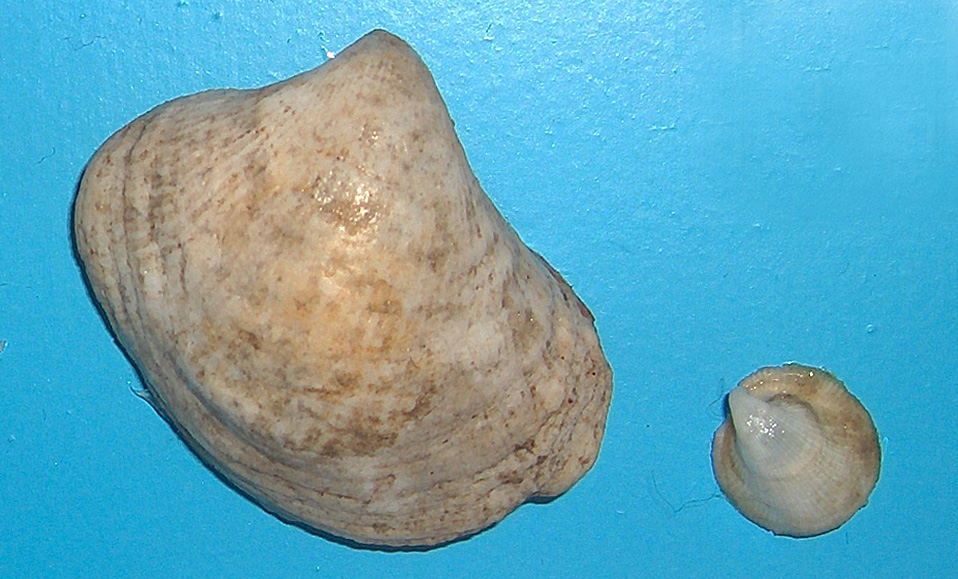
- Shells of modern Capulus cap sea snails
  Capulus – or unidentified comparable form
  - †Capulus silverthorni – type locality for species
- Cardinia
  - †Cardinia gleimi – type locality for species
- †Cardiomorpha – tentative report
  - †Cardiomorpha digglesi – type locality for species
- Cardita
  - †Cardita jenkinsi – type locality for species
- †Cassideus
  - †Cassideus yoloensis
- †Cecrops
  - †Cecrops septemporata
  - †Cecrops septemporatus
- †Celtites
  - †Celtites steindachneri
- Cenodiscus
  - †Cenodiscus alievi
- Cenosphaera
  - †Cenosphaera boria
- †Ceriostella
  - †Ceriostella martini
- Cerithidea
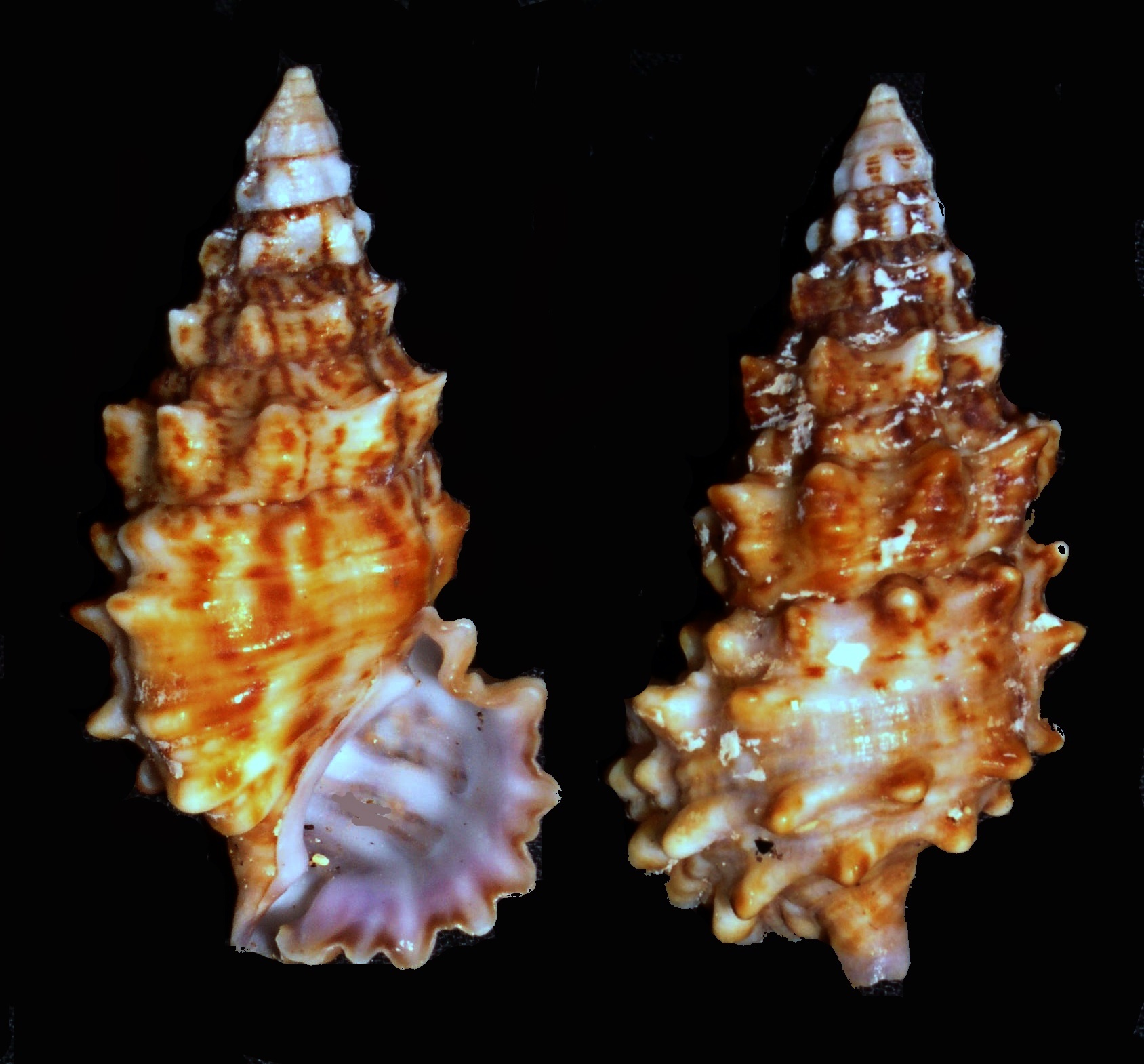
- Two views of a Cerithium cerith sea snail
  Cerithium
  - †Cerithium alternata
  - †Cerithium totiumsanctorum – or unidentified comparable form
- †Choristoceras
  - †Choristoceras klamathense – type locality for species
  - †Choristoceras marshi
- †Christitys – type locality for genus
  - †Christitys delta – type locality for species
  - †Christitys martini – or unidentified comparable form
  - †Christitys medica – type locality for species
- †Cidarina
  - †Cidarina beta – type locality for species
  - †Cidarina cretacea – type locality for species
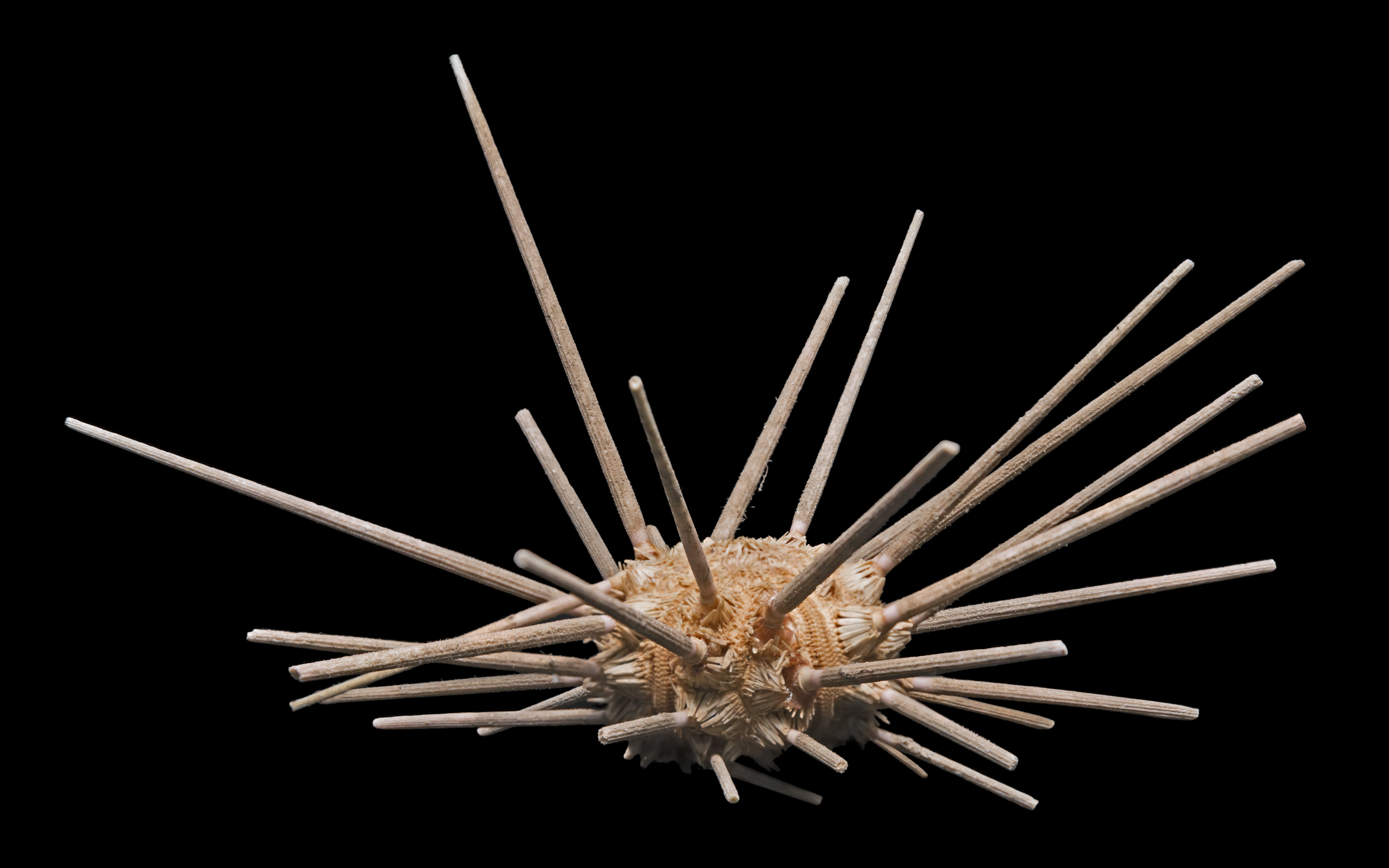
- Shell and spines of a Cidaris sea urchin
  Cidaris
  - †Cidaris californicus
  - †Cidaris plumasensis
  - †Cidaris taylorensis
- †Cladoceramus
  - †Cladoceramus undulatoplicatus
- †Clinura
  - †Clinura anassa
- †Clisocolus
  - †Clisocolus cordatus
  - †Clisocolus corrugatus
  - †Clisocolus dubius
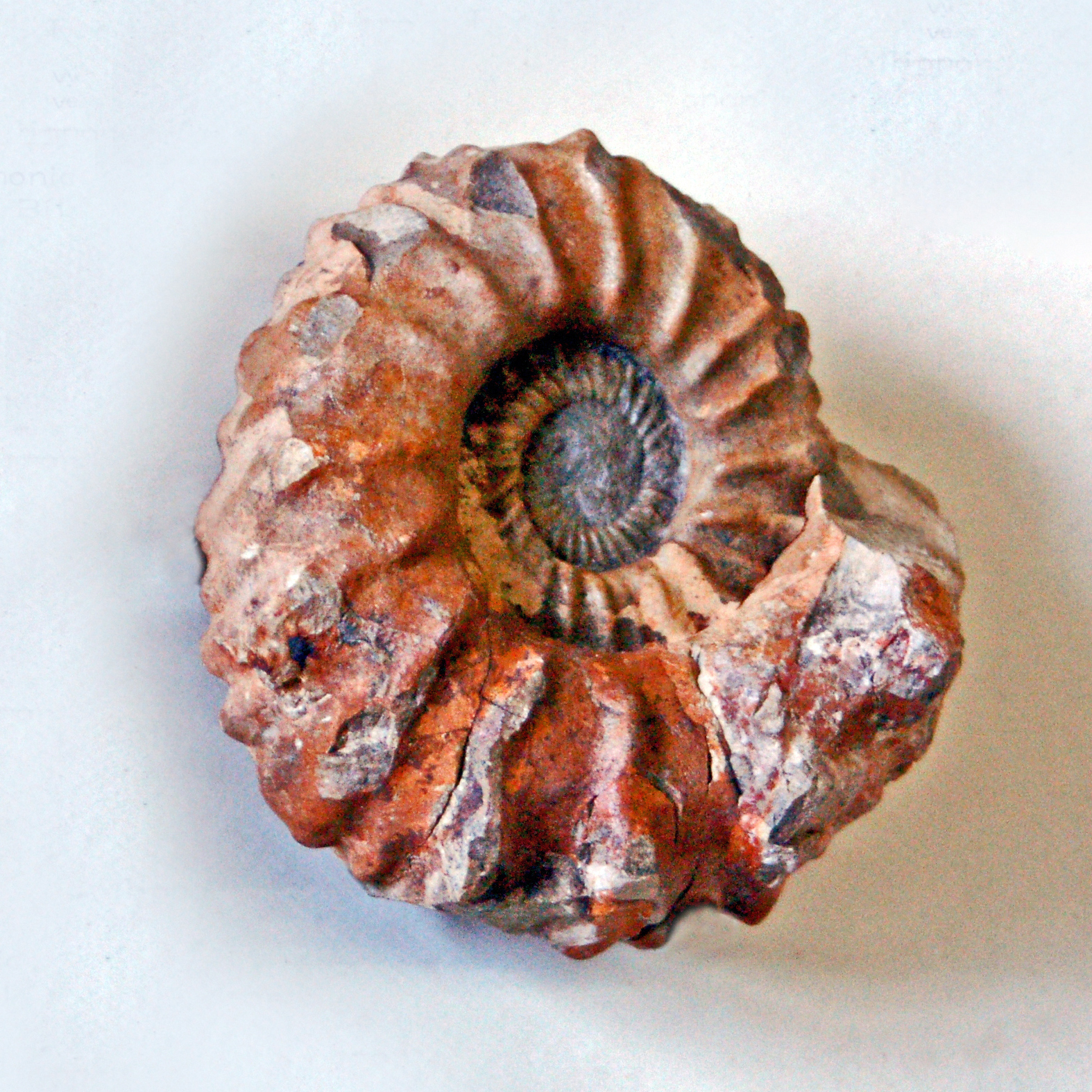
- Fossilized shell of the Late Cretaceous ammonoid Collignoniceras
  †Collignoniceras
  - †Collignoniceras bakeri
- †Collonia
  - †Collonia occidentalis – type locality for species
- †Cophocara
  - †Cophocara stantoni
- †Coralliochama
  - †Coralliochama orcutti
- Corbicula
  - †Corbicula astartoides
- Corbula
  - †Corbula cancellifera
  - †Corbula parilis
  - †Corbula pozo
  - †Corbula torta – or unidentified comparable form
  - †Corbula traski
  - †Corbula traskii
- Cornutella
- †Cosmonautilus
  - †Cosmonautilus dilleri
  - †Cosmonautilus hersheyi – type locality for species
  - †Cosmonautilus pacificus – type locality for species
  - †Cosmonautilus shastensis – type locality for species
- †Costispiriferina
  - †Costispiriferina pittensis
- †Courtilloticeras
  - †Courtilloticeras stevensi – type locality for species
- Crassatella
  - †Crassatella conradiana
  - †Crassatella mercedensis – tentative report
  - †Crassatella saulae
  - †Crassatella triangulata
  - †Crassatella triangulatus
- †Crassatellina
  - †Crassatellina saulae
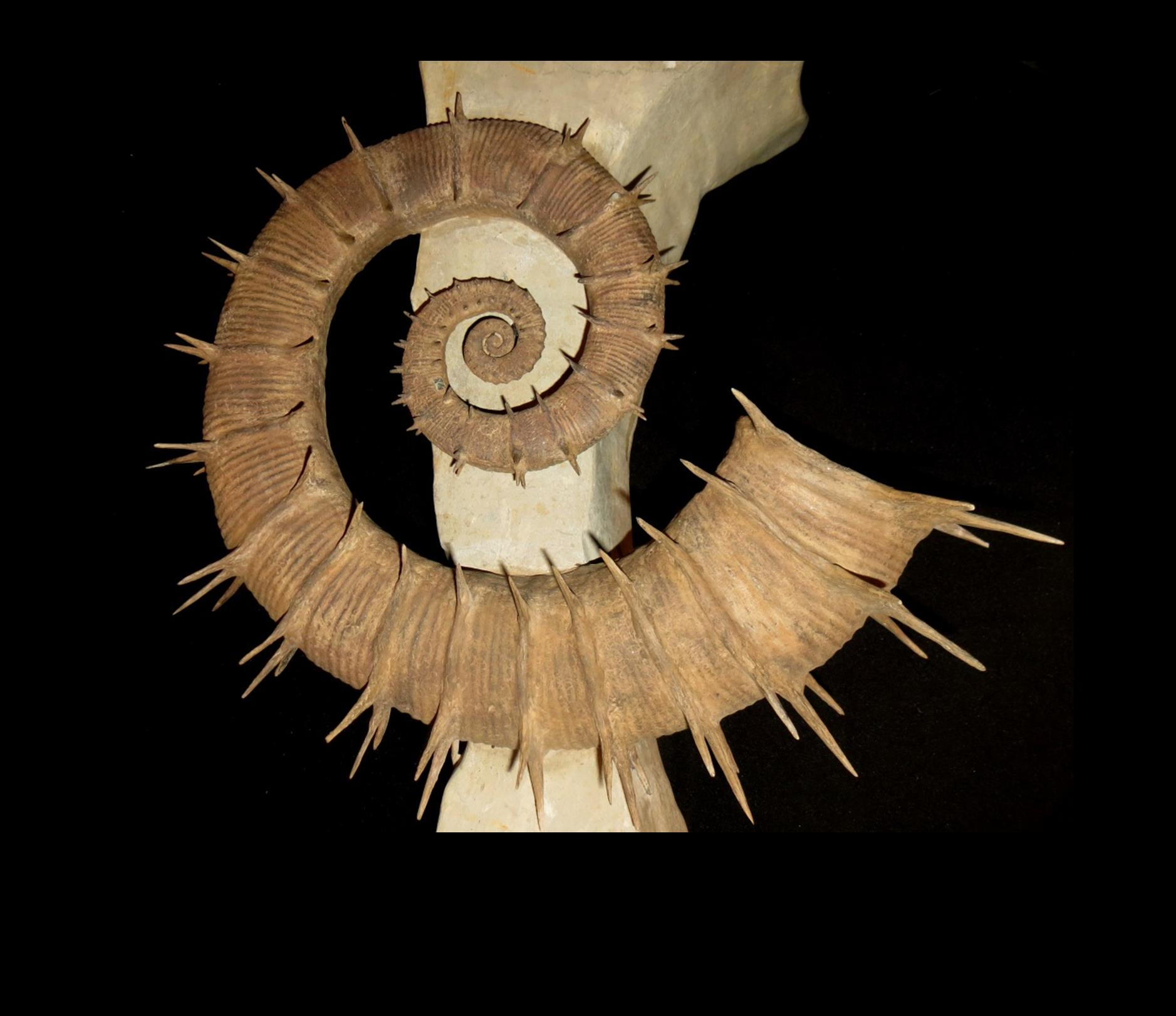
- Fossilized shell of the Early Cretaceous ammonoid cephalopod Crioceratites
  †Crioceratites
  - †Crioceratites latus
  - †Crioceratites tehamaensis – or unidentified comparable form
- †Crolanium
  - †Crolanium triquetrum
- †Crucella
  - †Crucella linda
  - †Crucella magna
  - †Crucella messinae
  - †Crucella theokaftensis
- Cucullaea
  - †Cucullaea alamoensis – type locality for species
  - †Cucullaea bowersiana
  - †Cucullaea gravida
  - †Cucullaea truncata
  - †Cucullaea youngi
- †Cunningtoniceras
  - †Cunningtoniceras meridionale – or unidentified related form
- †Cyclothyris
  - †Cyclothyris densleonis
- Cylichna
  - †Cylichna andersoni
- †Cylindroteuthis
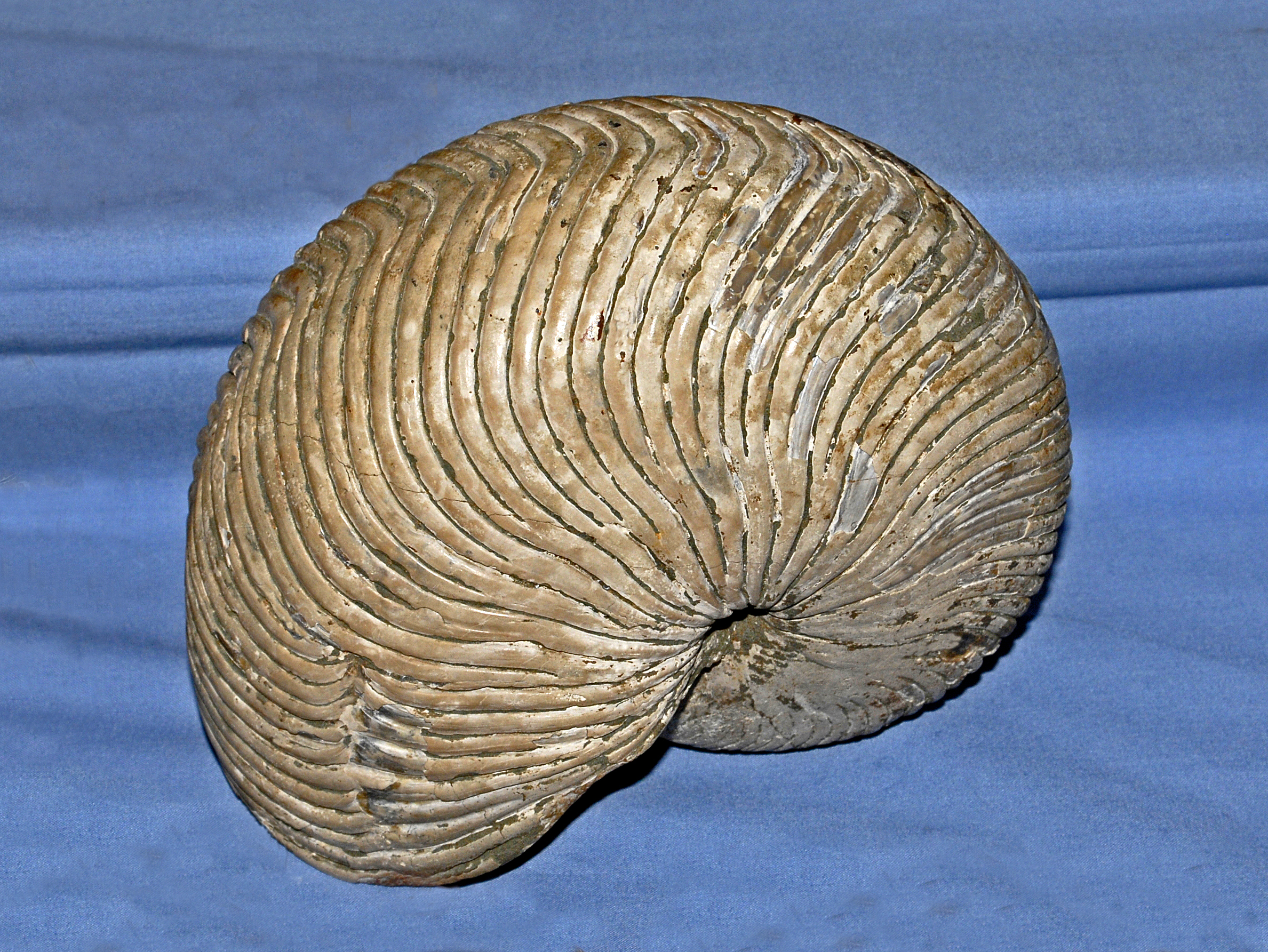
- Fossilized shell of the Late Jurassic-Oligocene nautiloid cephalopod Cymatoceras
  †Cymatoceras
  - †Cymatoceras carlottense
  - †Cymatoceras hermosus – type locality for species
- †Cymbophora
  - †Cymbophora asburnerii
  - †Cymbophora ashburnensis – or unidentified related form
  - †Cymbophora ashburnerii
  - †Cymbophora bella – or unidentified comparable form
  - †Cymbophora gabbiana
  - †Cymbophora popenoei
  - †Cymbophora stantoni
  - †Cymbophora tenuissima
  - †Cymbophora triangula
  - †Cymbophora triangulata
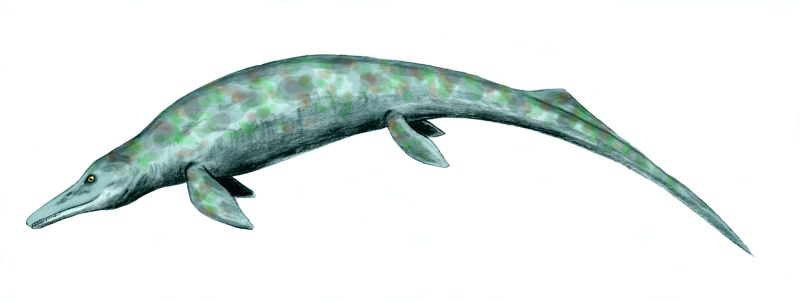
- Life restoration of the Middle-Late Triassic ichthyosaur Cymbospondylus
  †Cymbospondylus
  - †Cymbospondylus petrinus
- †Cymulopora – tentative report
- †Cyprimeria
  - †Cyprimeria moorei
- Cyrtocapsa – tentative report
  - †Cyrtocapsa kisoensis – or unidentified related form

== D ==
- †Damesites
  - †Damesites damesi
  - †Damesites frazierense
  - †Damesites gardeni – or unidentified related form
  - †Damesites hetonaiensis
  - †Damesites richardsoni – type locality for species
  - †Damesites subsugatum
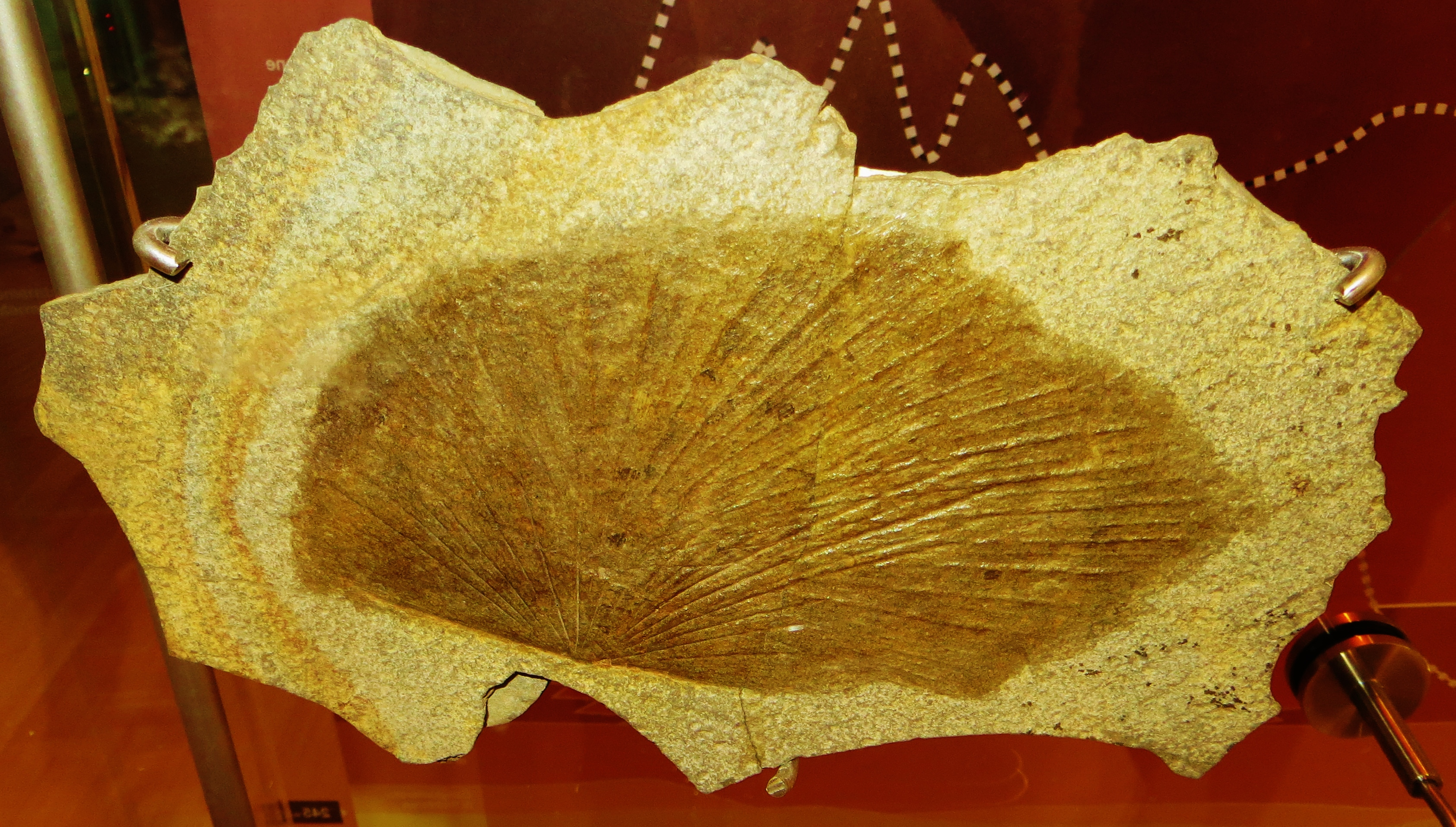
- Fossilized shell of the Middle-Late Triassic marine bivalve Daonella
  †Daonella – tentative report
  - †Daonella dubia
- †Darvelus
  - †Darvelus pessagnoi – type locality for species
  - †Darvelus primus – type locality for species
- Dentalina
  - †Dentalina legumen
- †Dentalium
  - †Dentalium cooperi
  - †Dentalium nanaimoense
  - †Dentalium whiteavesi
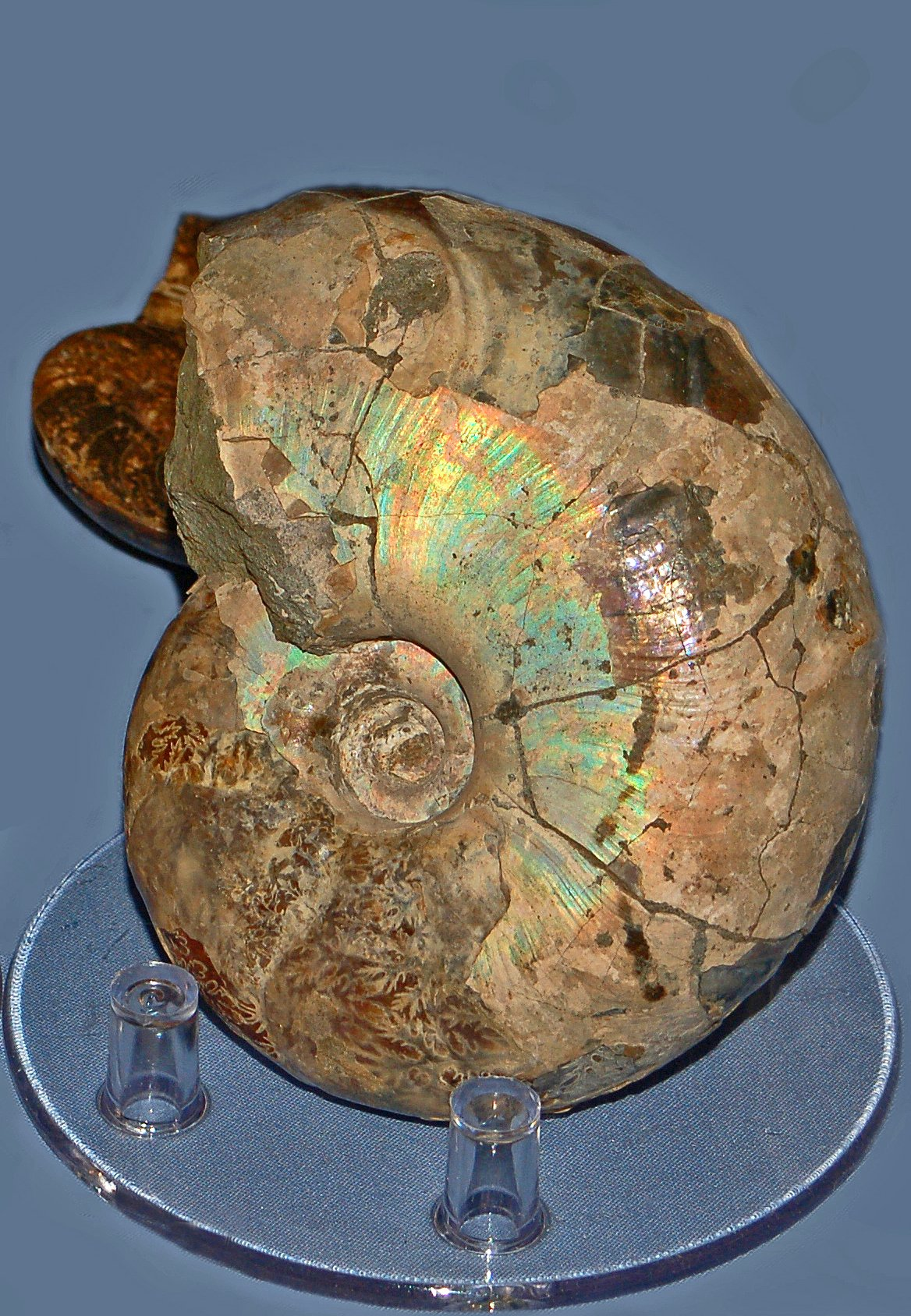
- Fossilized shells of the Early Cretaceous ammonoid cephalopod Desmoceras
  †Desmoceras
  - †Desmoceras alamoense – or unidentified comparable form
  - †Desmoceras argonauticum – or unidentified comparable form
  - †Desmoceras dawsoni
  - †Desmoceras inane
  - †Desmoceras japonicum
  - †Desmoceras voyi
- †Desmophyllites
  - †Desmophyllites diphylloides – type locality for species
- †Deviatus
  - †Deviatus deweveri
  - †Deviatus hipposidericus
- †Diacanthocapsa
- †Dicerosaturnalis
  - †Dicerosaturnalis dicranacanthos
- †Dicroa
- †Dicroloma
  - †Dicroloma nodosa
- †Dictyoconites
  - †Dictyoconites americanus – type locality for species
- †Dictyomitra
- †Dictyomitrella
  - †Dictyomitrella kamoensis
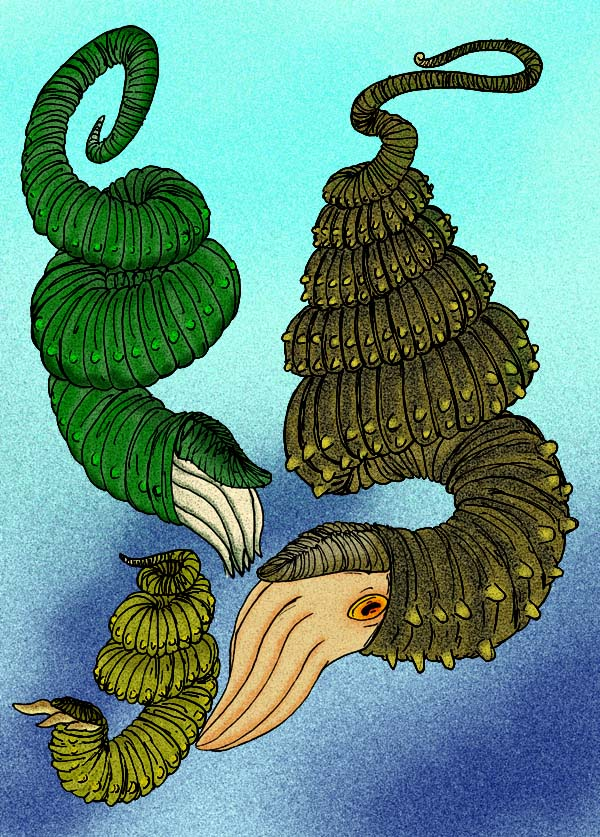
- Restoration of several species of the Late Cretaceous ammonoid cephalopod Didymoceras
  †Didymoceras
  - †Didymoceras hornbyense – or unidentified comparable form
  - †Didymoceras vancouverense – or unidentified comparable form
  - †Didymoceras vancouverensis
- †Dieneria – type locality for genus
  - †Dieneria arthaberi – type locality for species
- †Dieneroceras
  - †Dieneroceras dieneri – type locality for species
  - †Dieneroceras marcoui – type locality for species
  - †Dieneroceras spathi
  - †Dieneroceras subquadratum
- †Dillerites – type locality for genus
  - †Dillerites shastensis – type locality for species
- †Dimyodon
  - †Dimyodon storrsi – type locality for species
- †Diozoptyxis
  - †Diozoptyxis ursana – type locality for species
- Diplodonta
  - †Diplodonta davisi
- †Diplomoceras
  - †Diplomoceras ellipticum
  - †Diplomoceras jimboi – type locality for species
  - †Diplomoceras mustangense – type locality for species
- †Discohelix – tentative report
  - †Discohelix leana
- †Discophyllites
  - †Discophyllites patens
- †Discoproptychites
  - †Discoproptychites walcotti – type locality for species
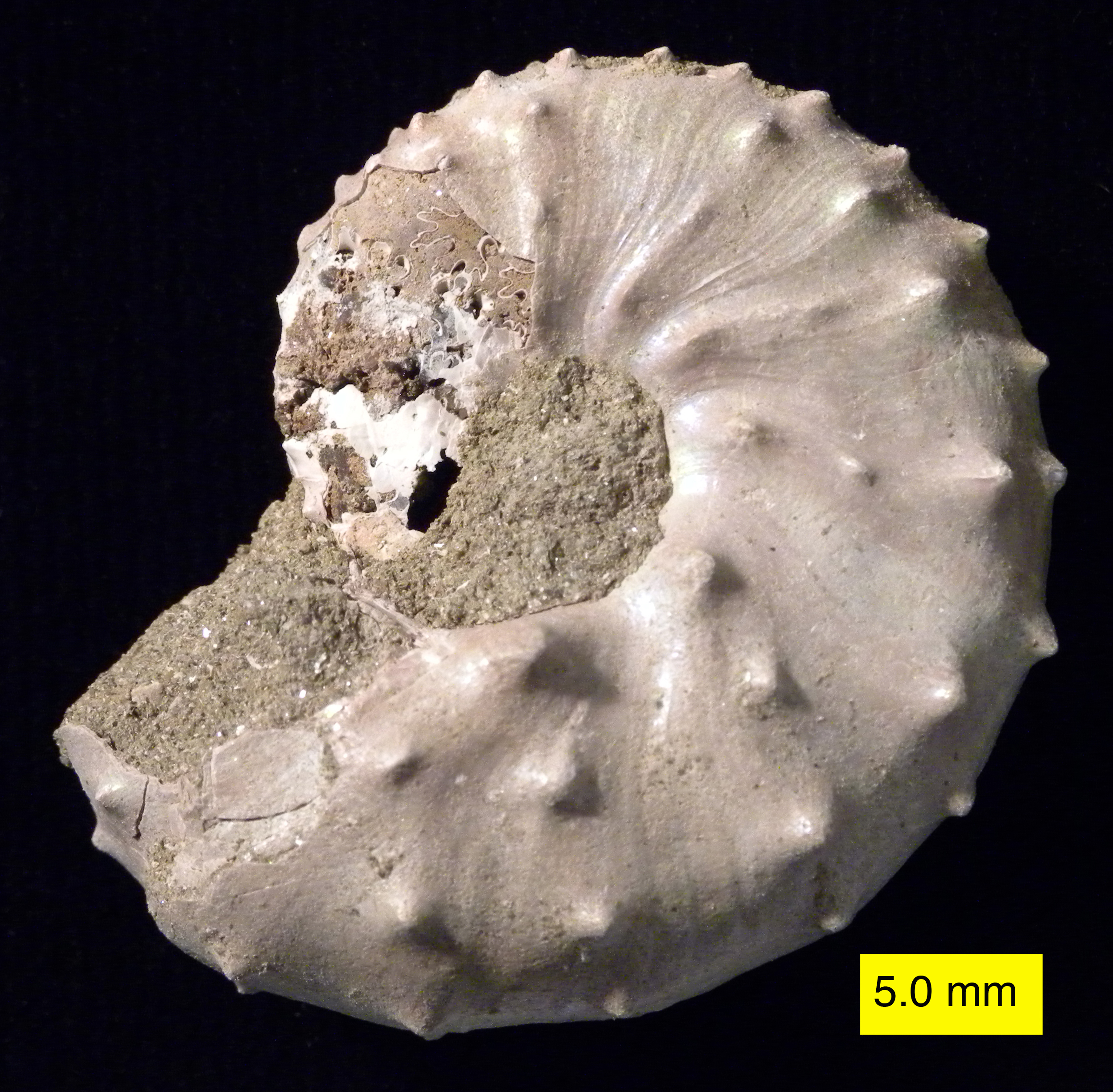
- Fossilized shell of the Late Cretaceous ammonoid cephalopod Discoscaphites
  †Discoscaphites
- †Discotropites
  - †Discotropites davisi – type locality for species
  - †Discotropites formosus – type locality for species
  - †Discotropites laurae
  - †Discotropites lineatus
  - †Discotropites mojsvarensis
  - †Discotropites plinii
  - †Discotropites sandlingensis
  - †Discotropites sengeli
  - †Discotropites smithi
  - †Discotropites theron
- †Distichophyllia
  - †Distichophyllia norica
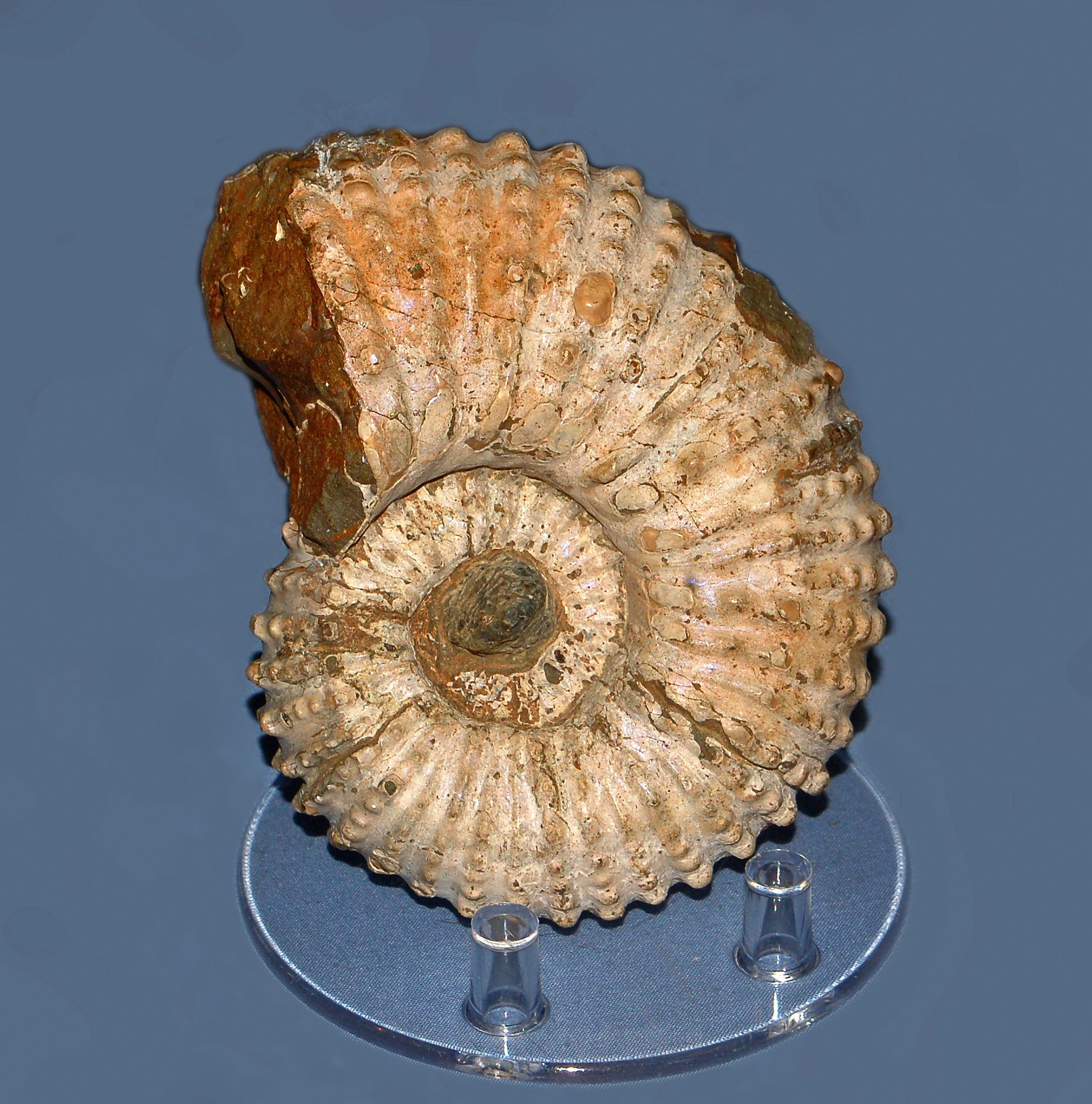
- Fossilized shell of the Early-Late Cretaceous ammonoid cephalopod Douvilleiceras
  †Douvilleiceras
  - †Douvilleiceras mammillatum – or unidentified comparable form
- †Drepanochilus
  - †Drepanochilus transversus
- †Drilluta – tentative report
- †Droltus
- †Dumitricaella – tentative report
  - †Dumitricaella cucurbitina – or unidentified related form
- †Durania
  - †Durania californica – type locality for species

== E ==
- †Echinocorys
  - †Echinocorys yoloensis – type locality for species
- †Elimia
  - †Elimia veatchii
- †Ellipsoscapha
  - †Ellipsoscapha nortonensis – or unidentified comparable form
  - †Ellipsoscapha skaios
- †Emiluvia
  - †Emiluvia chica
  - †Emiluvia dollarbendensis
  - †Emiluvia fontana
  - †Emiluvia hopsoni
  - †Emiluvia lowercoonensis
  - †Emiluvia nana
  - †Emiluvia pessagnoi
  - †Emiluvia premyogii
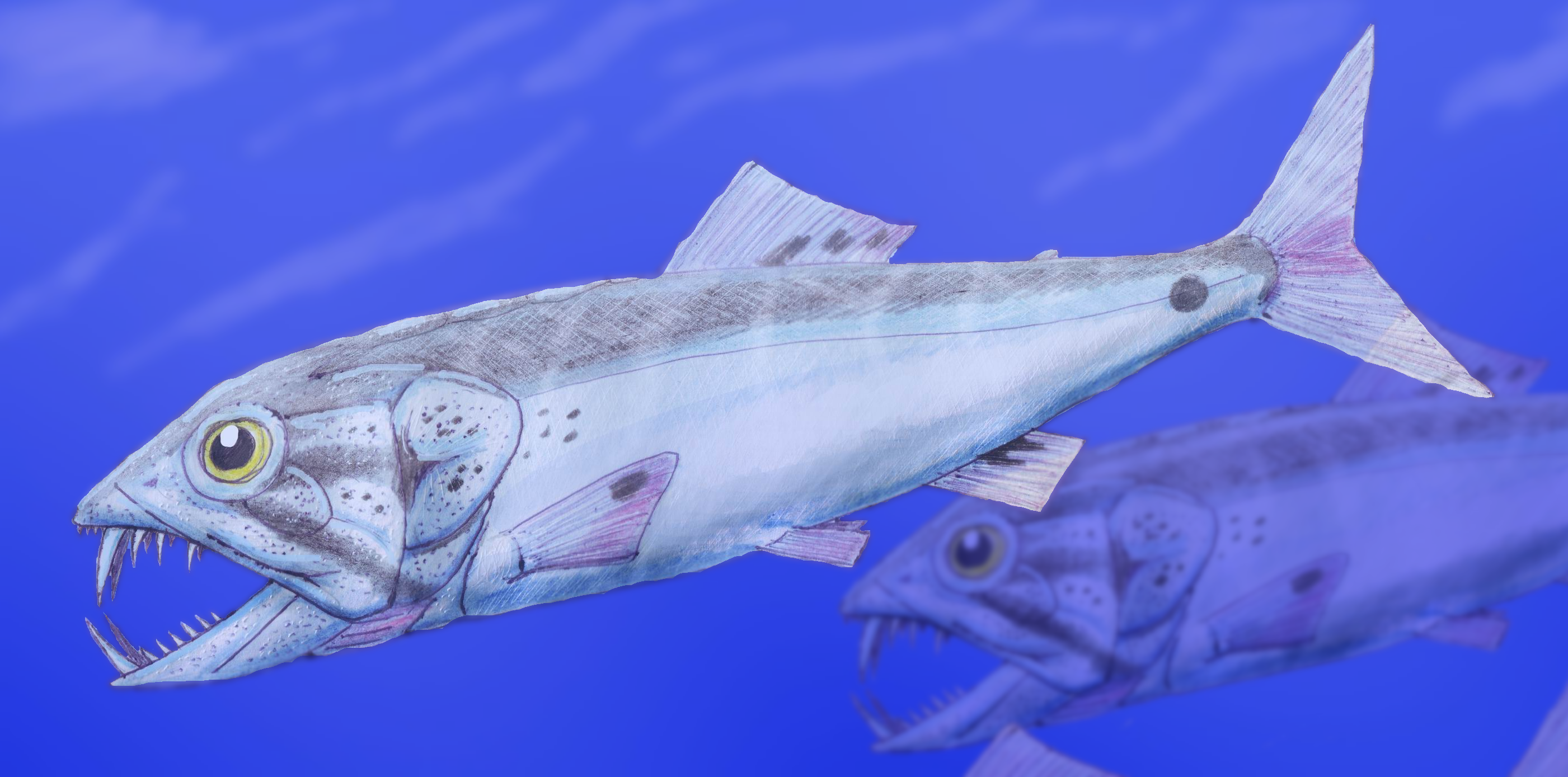
- Restoration of the Early Cretaceous-Eocene bony fish Enchodus, or the "saber-toothed herring"
  †Enchodus
- †Endoptygma
  - †Endoptygma hermax – type locality for species
- †Entobia
- †Entolium
  - †Entolium equabile
  - †Entolium meeki
  - †Entolium pittensis – type locality for species
- †Eocomoseris
  - †Eocomoseris ramosa
- †Eocypraea
  - †Eocypraea louellae – type locality for species
- †Eodanubites
  - †Eodanubites judae – type locality for species
- †Eogaudryceras
  - †Eogaudryceras wintunius
- †Eogunnarites
  - †Eogunnarites matsumotoi
- †Eospongosaturninus
  - †Eospongosaturninus protoformis
- †Eripachla
  - †Eripachla ponderosa
- †Eripachya
  - †Eripachya ponderosa
- †Eriphyla
  - †Eriphyla lapida
  - †Eriphyla lapidus
  - †Eriphyla umbonata
- †Etea
  - †Etea occidentalis
- †Eucalycoceras
  - †Eucalycoceras diabloense – type locality for species
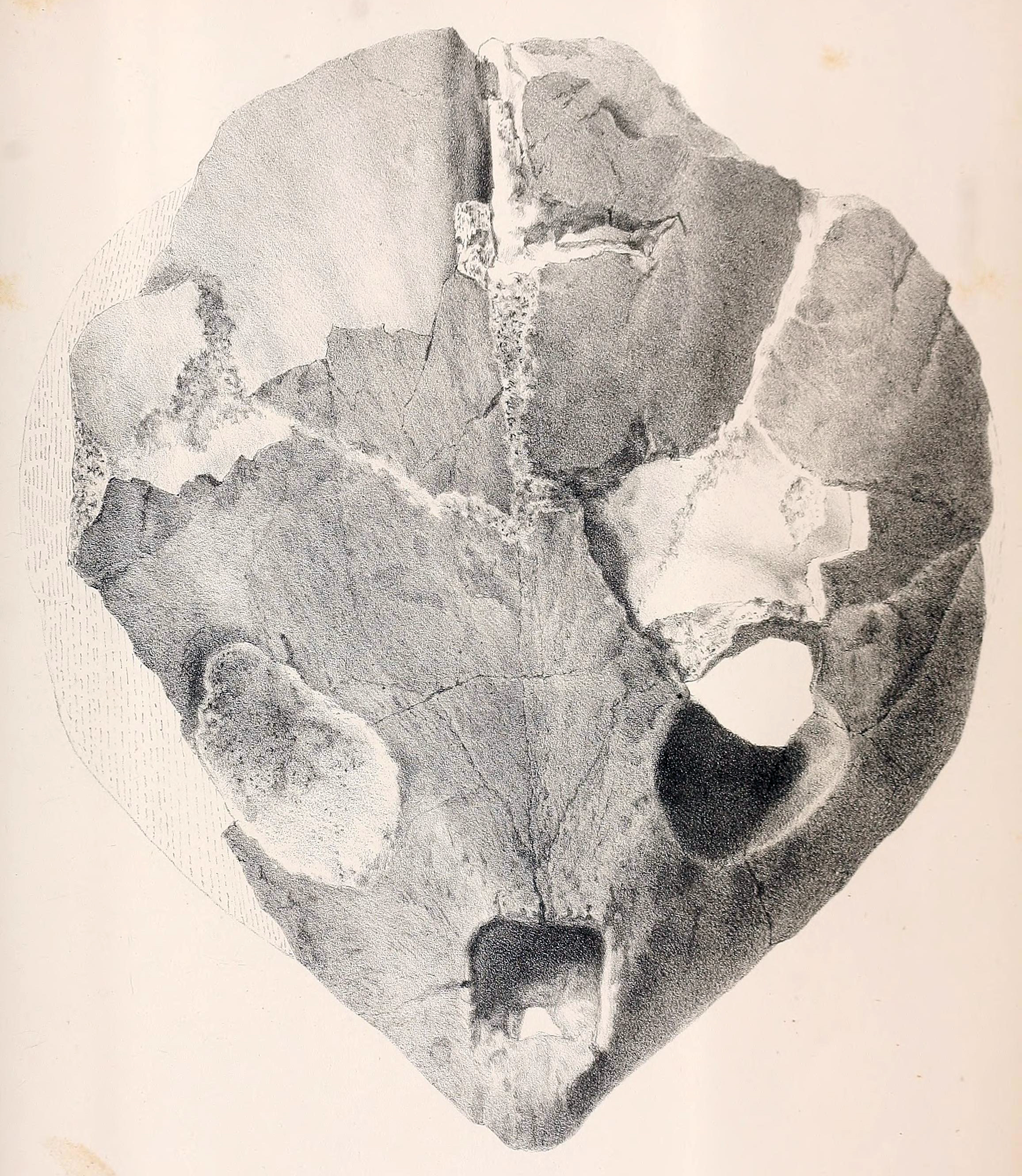
- Illustration of the fossilized skull of the sea turtle Euclastes
  †Euclastes
- †Eucymatoceras
  - †Eucymatoceras plicatum
- †Eucyrtidiellum
  - †Eucyrtidiellum ptyctum
  - †Eucyrtidiellum takemurai
  - †Eucyrtidiellum unumaense
- †Eucyrtidium – tentative report
- †Euidothyris
  - †Euidothyris lucerna – type locality for species
- †Euomphaloceras
  - †Euomphaloceras septemseriatum
- †Eupachydiscus
  - †Eupachydiscus arbucklensis – type locality for species
  - †Eupachydiscus haradai
  - †Eupachydiscus lamberti – or unidentified related form
  - †Eupachydiscus willgreeni – type locality for species
- †Euspira
  - †Euspira compressa
  - †Euspira marianus
  - †Euspira popenoei
  - †Euspira shumardiana
- †Eutrephoceras
  - †Eutrephoceras campbelli
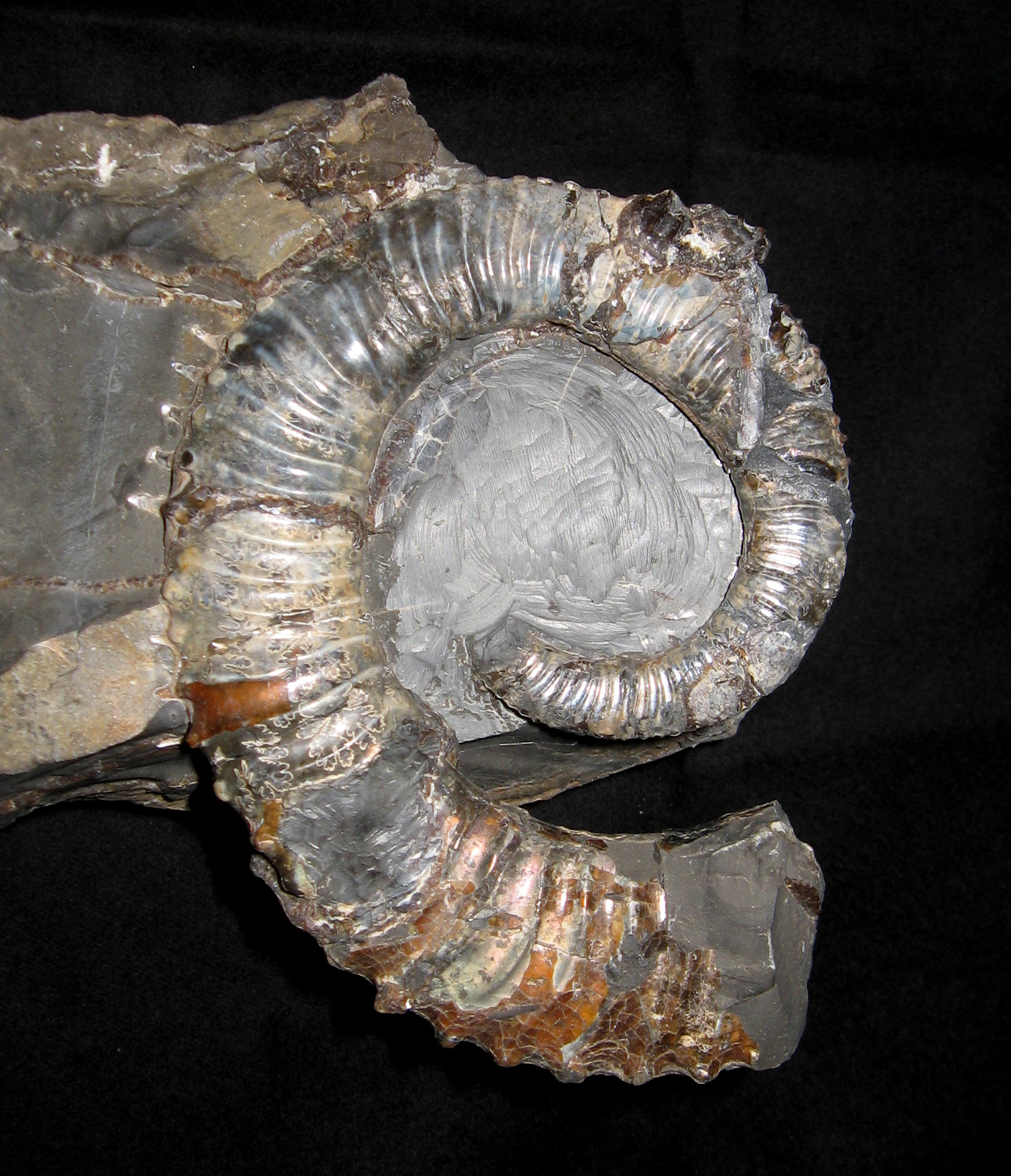
- Fossilized shell of the Late Cretaceous ammonoid cephalopod Exiteloceras
  †Exiteloceras
  - †Exiteloceras bennisoni – type locality for species
  - †Exiteloceras desertense – type locality for species
  - †Exiteloceras diabloense – tentative report
  - †Exiteloceras ortigalitoense – type locality for species
  - †Exiteloceras vancouverense
- †Exogyra

== F ==
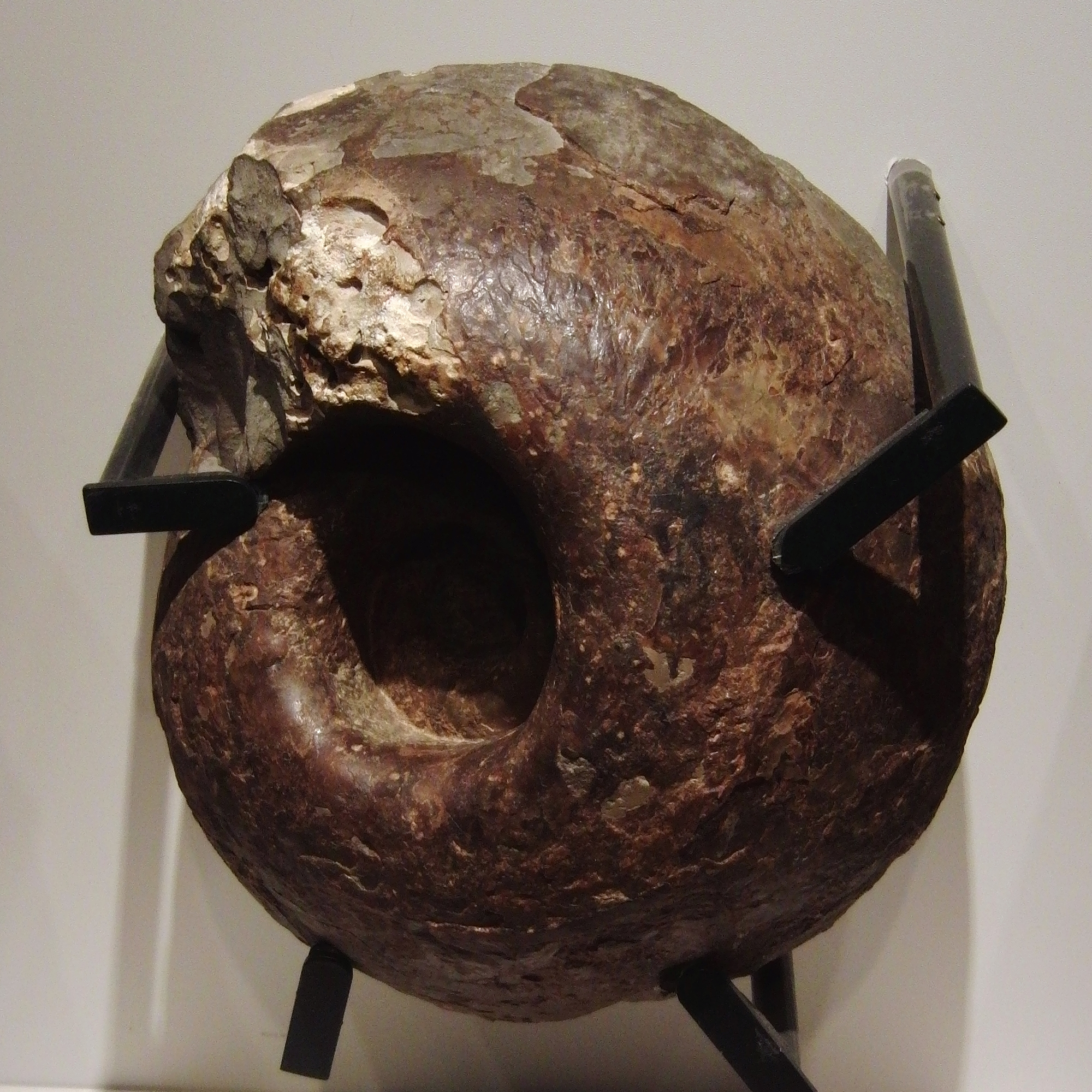
- Fossilized shell of the Late Cretaceous ammonoid cephalopod Fagesia
  †Fagesia
  - †Fagesia catinus – type locality for species
  - †Fagesia klamathensis – type locality for species
- Fissurella – tentative report
- †Flabellina
  - †Flabellina pilulifera
- †Flabellirhynchia
  - †Flabellirhynchia concinna – type locality for species
  - †Flabellirhynchia falconis – type locality for species
- †Flabellum
  - †Flabellum fresnoense – type locality for species
- †Flaventia
  - †Flaventia lens
- †Foremanina
- †Francisciconcha
  - †Francisciconcha maslennikovi
- †Fresnosaurus – type locality for genus
  - †Fresnosaurus drescheri – type locality for species
- Frondicularia
  - †Frondicularia undulosa – or unidentified comparable form

== G ==
- †Gabbioceras
  - †Gabbioceras angulatum
- †Garzasia
  - †Garzasia diabla
  - †Garzasia intermedia – or unidentified comparable form
- Gastrochaena – tentative report
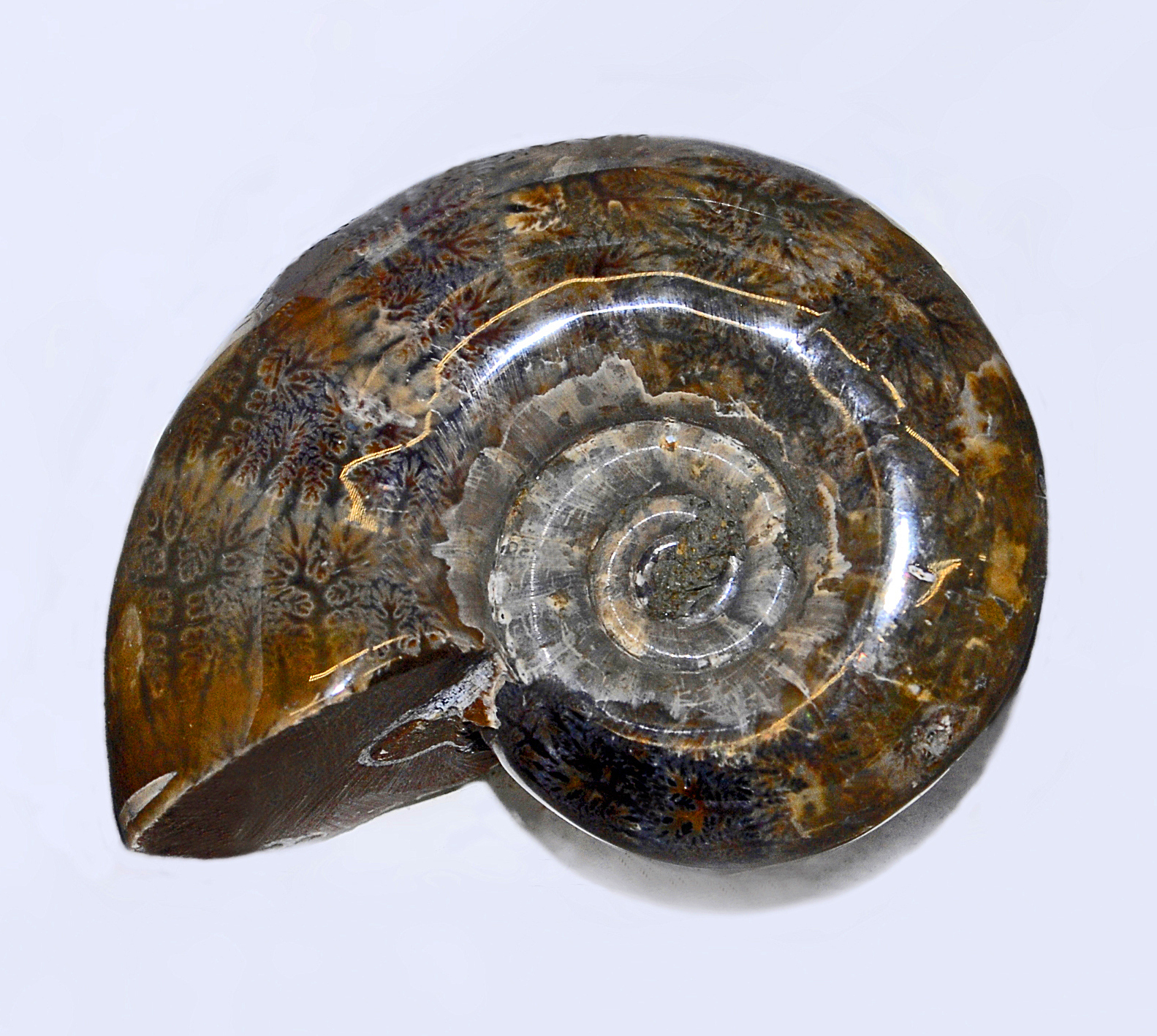
- Fossilized shell of the Cretaceous ammonoid cephalopod Gaudryceras
  †Gaudryceras
  - †Gaudryceras alamedense
  - †Gaudryceras aureum – type locality for species
  - †Gaudryceras cinctum – or unidentified related form
  - †Gaudryceras debnabebse – or unidentified comparable form
  - †Gaudryceras denmanense – or unidentified comparable form
  - †Gaudryceras kayei – type locality for species
  - †Gaudryceras tenuiliratum – tentative report
  - †Gaudryceras texanum – type locality for species
- †Gervillia
  - †Gervillia shastensis
- Glans – tentative report
  - †Glans veneriformis
- †Glauconia
- †Globigerinelloides
- †Globirhynchia
  - †Globirhynchia gnathophora – type locality for species
  - †Globirhynchia oblatopinguis – type locality for species
  - †Globirhynchia rhacta – type locality for species
  - †Globirhynchia schucherti – type locality for species
- Glossus
  - †Glossus delta
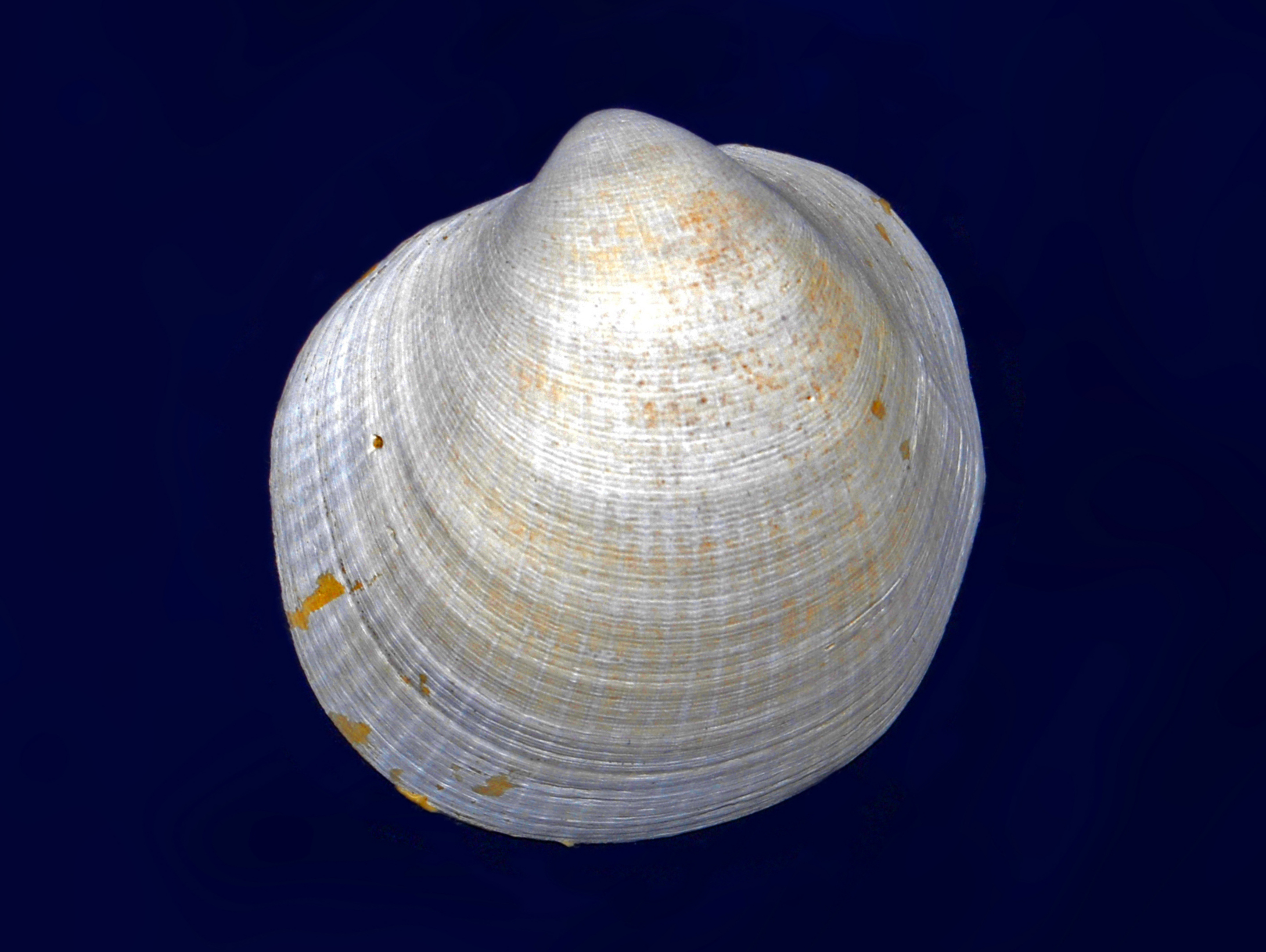
- Fossilized shell of a Glycymeris, or bittersweet clam
  Glycymeris
  - †Glycymeris anae
  - †Glycymeris apletos
  - †Glycymeris banosensis – type locality for species
  - †Glycymeris pacifica – or unidentified comparable form
  - †Glycymeris pacificus
  - †Glycymeris shastensis – type locality for species
  - †Glycymeris suciensis
  - †Glycymeris veatchii
  - †Glycymeris yoloensis
- †Glyptoxoceras
  - †Glyptoxoceras largesulcatum – or unidentified comparable form
  - †Glyptoxoceras subcompressum – or unidentified comparable form
- †Gnathorhynchia
  - †Gnathorhynchia perplicata – type locality for species
- †Gnomohalorites
  - †Gnomohalorites americanus
- Gongylothorax
  - †Gongylothorax oblongus – or unidentified related form
- †Goniojuvavites
  - †Goniojuvavites kellyi – type locality for species
- †Gonionotites
  - †Gonionotites northi – type locality for species
- †Gorgansium
  - †Gorgansium pulchrum
- †Goricanites – type locality for genus
  - †Goricanites noblei – type locality for species
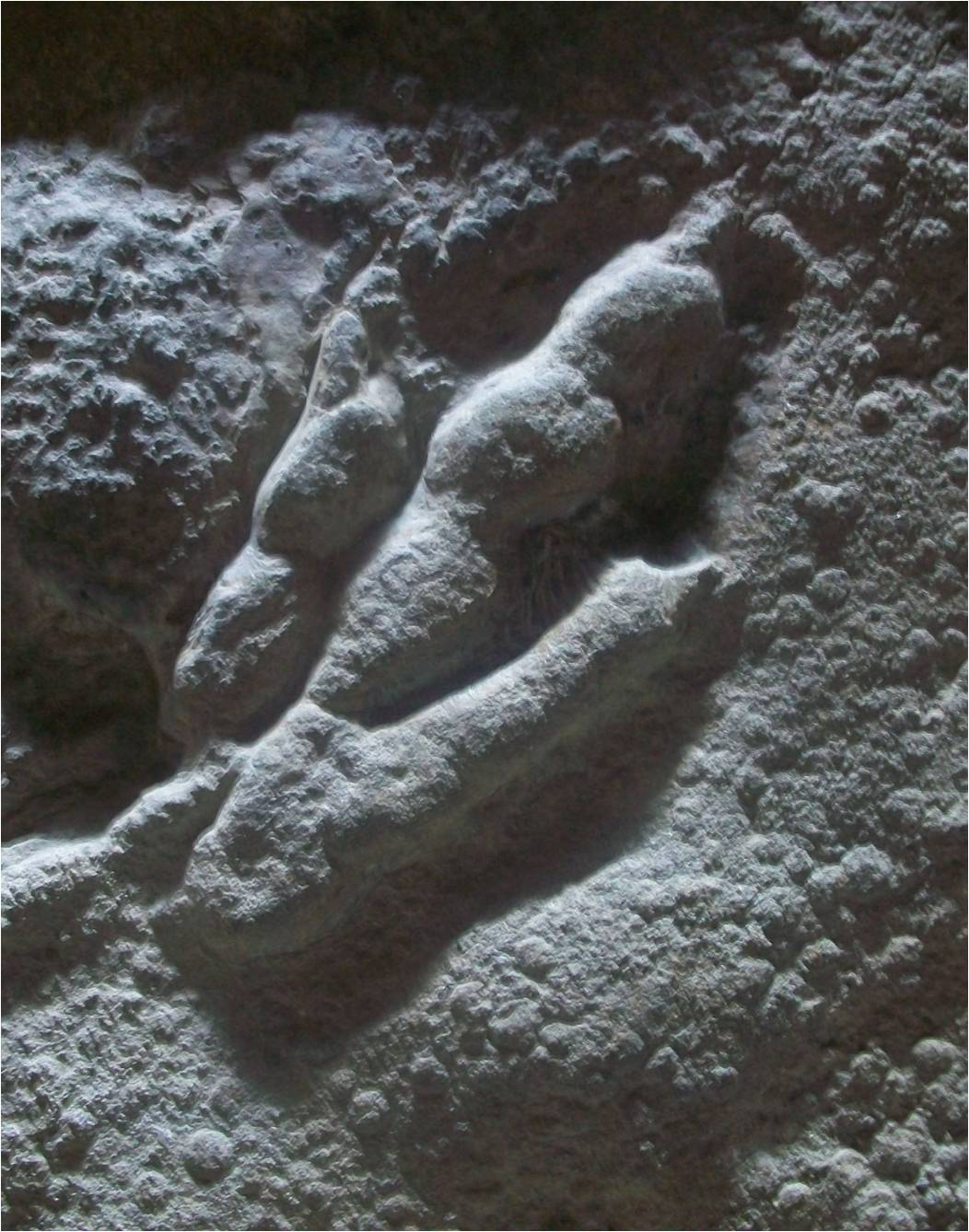
- Fossil negative with skin impressions of the theropod dinosaur footprint ichnogenus Grallator
  †Grallator
- †Grammatodon
  - †Grammatodon vancouverensis
- †Gryphaea
- †Gryponautilus
  - †Gryponautilus cooperi – type locality for species
- †Guexella
- †Guineana
  - †Guineana alta
- †Guodunites
  - †Guodunites hooveri – type locality for species
- †Gymnotropites
  - †Gymnotropites americanus – type locality for species
  - †Gymnotropites laevis – type locality for species
  - †Gymnotropites rotundus – type locality for species
- Gyrodes
  - †Gyrodes allisoni
  - †Gyrodes californicus
  - †Gyrodes canadensis
  - †Gyrodes conradiana
  - †Gyrodes dowelli
  - †Gyrodes expansa
  - †Gyrodes expansus
  - †Gyrodes greeni – type locality for species
  - †Gyrodes pacificum
  - †Gyrodes pacificus – or unidentified comparable form
  - †Gyrodes quercus
- Gyroidina
  - †Gyroidina depressa

== H ==
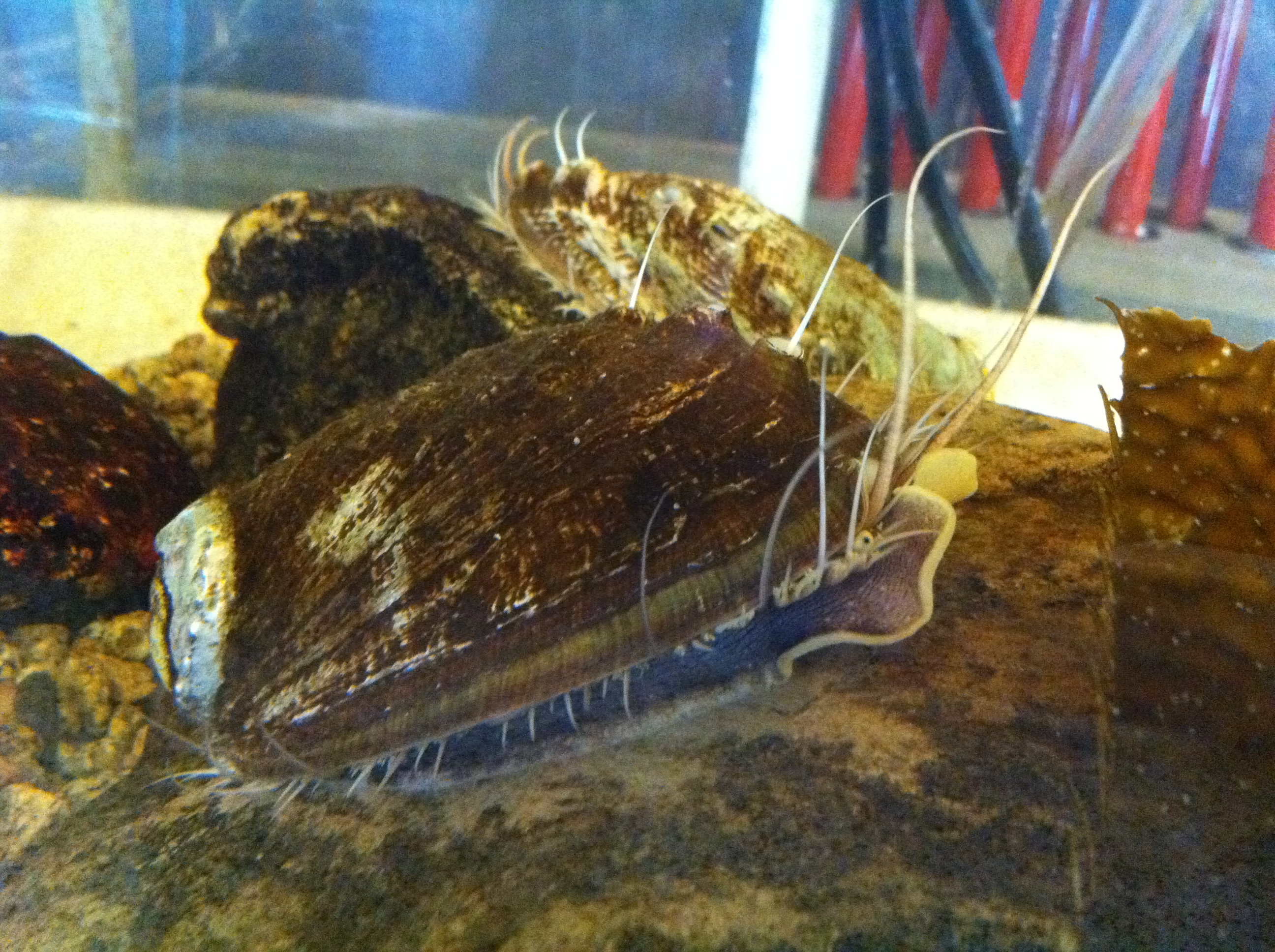
- A living Haliotis, or abalone
  Haliotis
- †Halobia
  - †Halobia austriaca
  - †Halobia cordillerana
  - †Halobia gigantea
  - †Halobia ornatissima
  - †Halobia rugosa
  - †Halobia superba
- †Hauericeras
  - †Hauericeras angustum
  - †Hauericeras churchi – type locality for species
  - †Hauericeras mickeyi – type locality for species
- †Hauerites
  - †Hauerites lawsoni – type locality for species
- †Haydenia
  - †Haydenia impressa
- †Hecticoceras
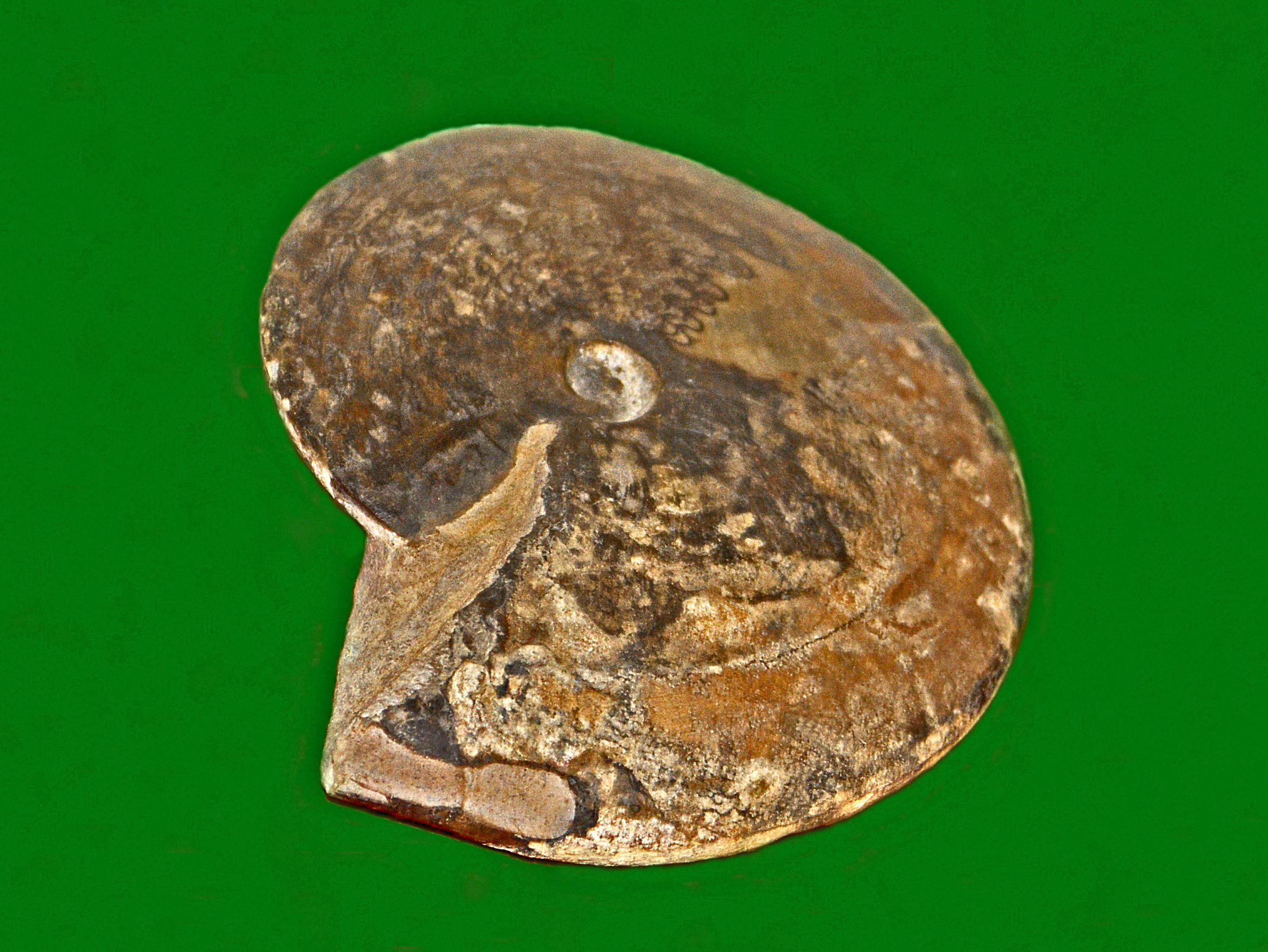
- Fossilized shell of the Triassic ammonoid cephalopod Hedenstroemia
  †Hedenstroemia
  - †Hedenstroemia kossmati
- †Helena
  - †Helena exquisita
- †Helicaulax
  - †Helicaulax popenoei – type locality for species
- Hemiaster
  - †Hemiaster californicus
- †Hemicidaris
  - †Hemicidaris intumescens
- †Hemicryptocapsa
  - †Hemicryptocapsa ruesti – or unidentified related form
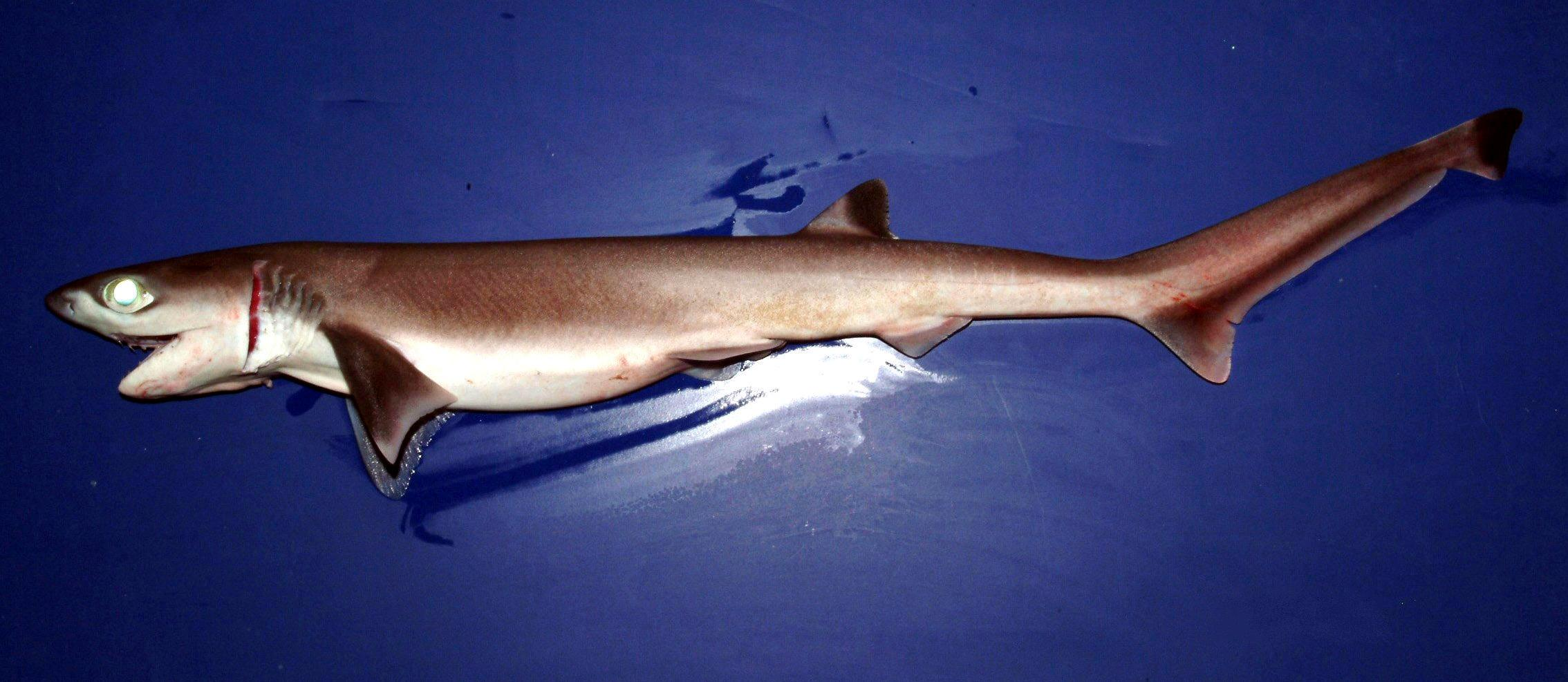
- Modern individual of the Cretaceous-modern cow shark genus Heptranchias
  Heptranchias
- †Hertleinites
  - †Hertleinites aguila
  - †Hertleinites pecki
- †Heteroderma
- †Hexasaturnalis
  - †Hexasaturnalis hexagonus
- †Hexasphaera
  - †Hexasphaera baumgartneri
- †Higumastra
  - †Higumastra boucoti
  - †Higumastra devilsgapensis
  - †Higumastra dumitricai
  - †Higumastra imbricata
  - †Higumastra inflata – or unidentified related form
  - †Higumastra transversa
- †Hilarisirex
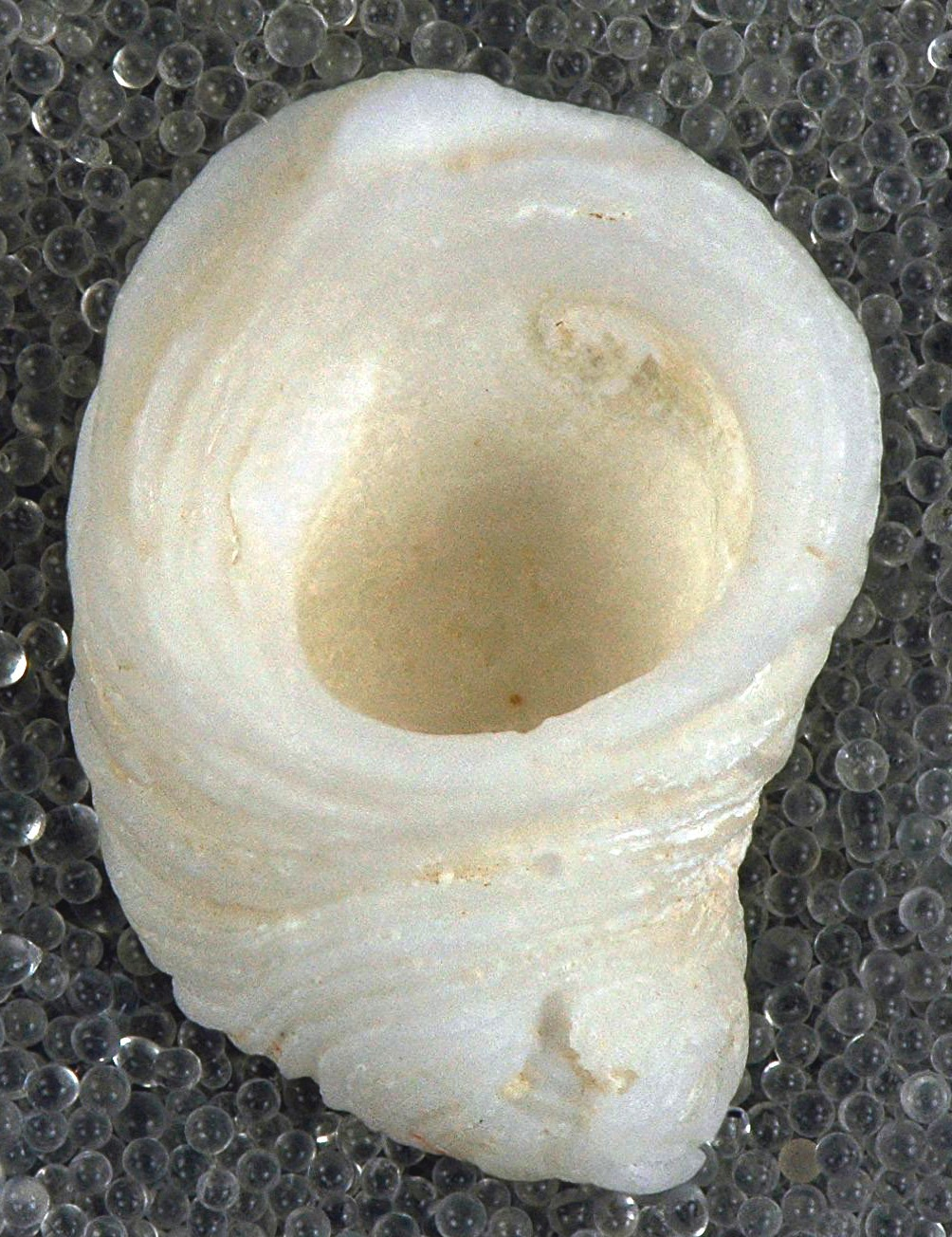
- Shell of a Hipponix, or hoof sea snail
  Hipponix
  - †Hipponix dichotomus
- †Hiscocapsa
  - †Hiscocapsa acuta
  - †Hiscocapsa japonica – or unidentified comparable form
  - †Hiscocapsa robusta
- †Hokkaidoconcha
  - †Hokkaidoconcha bilirata – type locality for species
  - †Hokkaidoconcha morenoensis – type locality for species
  - †Hokkaidoconcha occidentalis
  - †Hokkaidoconcha tehamaensis – type locality for species
- †Holcodiscoides
  - †Holcodiscoides gorrilli – type locality for species
- †Holcophylloceras – tentative report
- †Hollisites
  - †Hollisites inflatus
  - †Hollisites lucasi
- †Holocryptocanium
  - †Holocryptocanium astiensis
  - †Holocryptocanium barbui
  - †Holocryptocanium geysersensis
  - †Holocryptocanium tuberculatum
- †Homerites
  - †Homerites semiglobosus
- †Homoeoparonaella
  - †Homoeoparonaella barbata
  - †Homoeoparonaella elegans
  - †Homoeoparonaella gigantea
  - †Homoeoparonaella glinesi
  - †Homoeoparonaella radians
  - †Homoeoparonaella scurrae
- †Homolsomites
  - †Homolsomites mutabilis
- †Hoplocrioceras
  - †Hoplocrioceras ducanense
  - †Hoplocrioceras duncanense
  - †Hoplocrioceras remondi
- †Hoplotropites
  - †Hoplotropites jokelyi
- †Hormathospongia – type locality for genus
  - †Hormathospongia dictyota – type locality for species
- †Hsuum
  - †Hsuum baldfacense
  - †Hsuum brevicostatum
  - †Hsuum maxwelli
  - †Hsuum mclaughlini
  - †Hsuum naturale
  - †Hsuum obispoensis
  - †Hsuum rutogense
  - †Hsuum santamariaense
  - †Hsuum speciosum
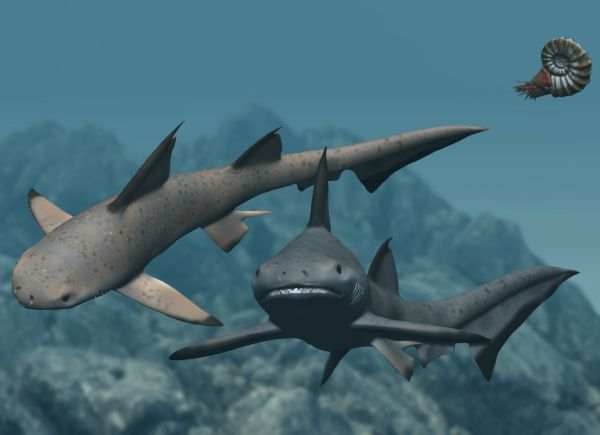
- Restoration of two of the Permian-Late Cretaceous cartilaginous fish Hybodus
  †Hybodus
  - †Hybodus shastensis – type locality for species
- †Hydrotherosaurus – type locality for genus
  - †Hydrotherosaurus alexandrae – type locality for species
- †Hyphantoceras
  - †Hyphantoceras ceratopse
  - †Hyphantoceras venustum – or unidentified comparable form
- †Hypophylloceras
  - †Hypophylloceras onoense – or unidentified related form

== I ==
- †Icantia
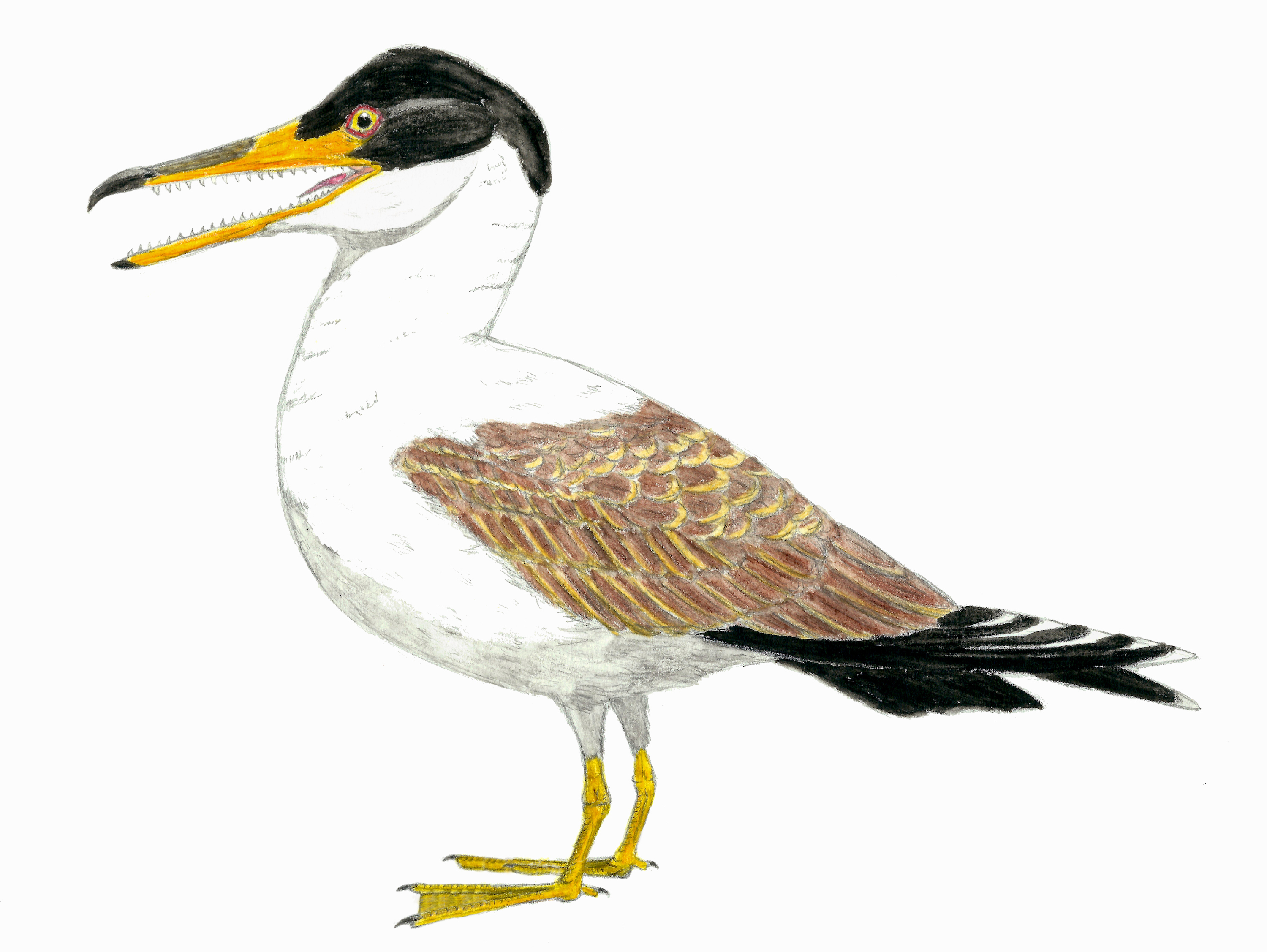
- Restoration of the Late Cretaceous toothed bird Ichthyornis
  †Ichthyornis
- †Ichthyosaurus
  - †Ichthyosaurus californicus – type locality for species
  - †Ichthyosaurus franciscanus – type locality for species
- †Igonoia
  - †Igonoia shastana
- †Indonesites
  - †Indonesites sphaericus
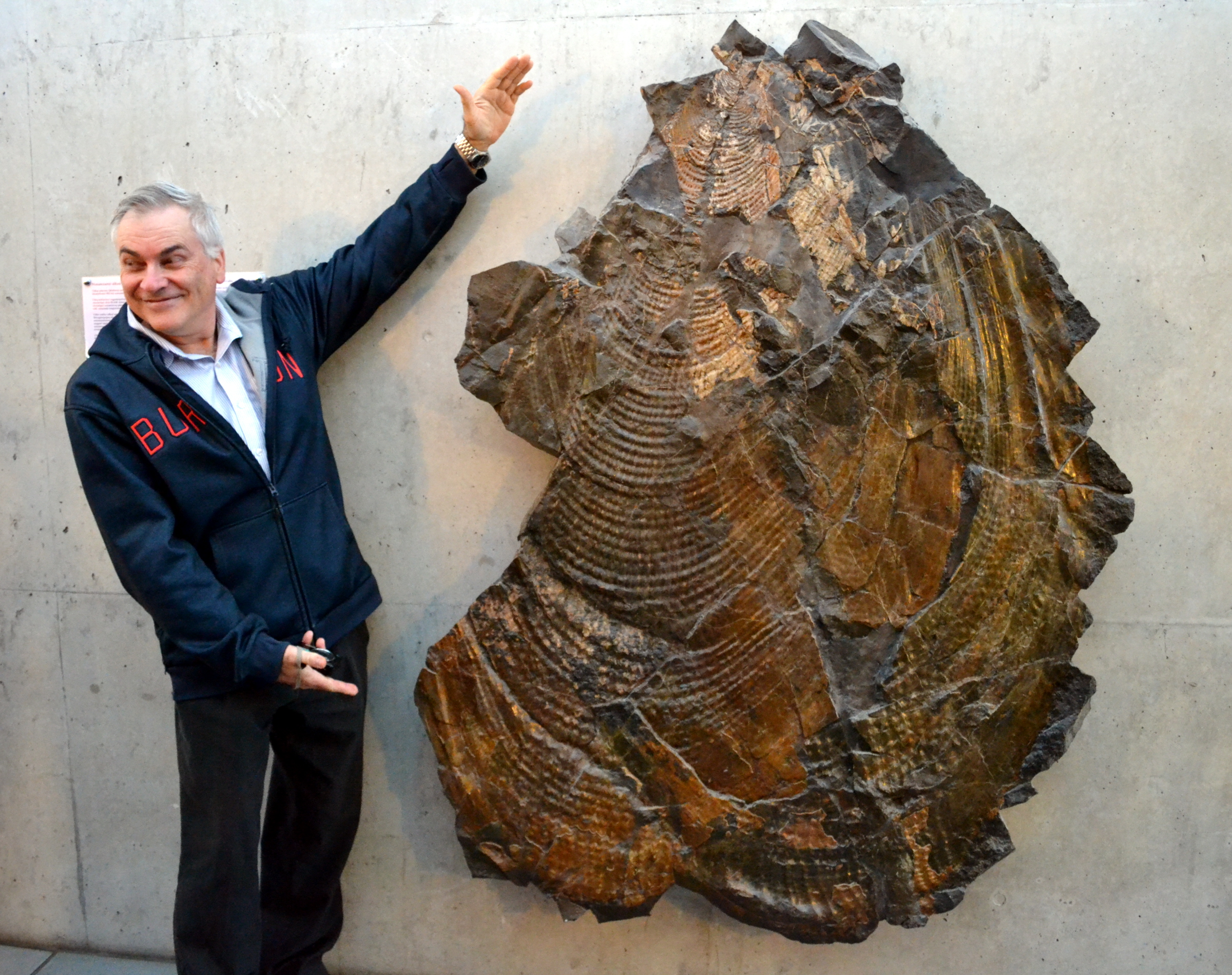
- Fossilized shell of the Early Jurassic-Late Cretaceous marine bivalve Inoceramus with a human indicating its size
  †Inoceramus
  - †Inoceramus aduncas
  - †Inoceramus aduncus
  - †Inoceramus amakusensis – or unidentified comparable form
  - †Inoceramus angulatus – or unidentified comparable form
  - †Inoceramus balticus
  - †Inoceramus chicoensis – type locality for species
  - †Inoceramus cordiformis – or unidentified comparable form
  - †Inoceramus cymbaeformis – or unidentified related form
  - †Inoceramus digitatus – or unidentified related form
  - †Inoceramus ezoensis – or unidentified comparable form
  - †Inoceramus glennensis
  - †Inoceramus goldfussi – or unidentified comparable form
  - †Inoceramus gradilis
  - †Inoceramus incertus – or unidentified comparable form
  - †Inoceramus jacksonensis – type locality for species
  - †Inoceramus japonicus – or unidentified comparable form
  - †Inoceramus klamathensis
  - †Inoceramus naumanni
  - †Inoceramus pembertoni – or unidentified related form
  - †Inoceramus regularis – or unidentified related form
  - †Inoceramus shikotanensis – or unidentified comparable form
  - †Inoceramus stanislausensis
  - †Inoceramus steinmanni – or unidentified comparable form
  - †Inoceramus subundantus
  - †Inoceramus subundatus
  - †Inoceramus teshioensis – or unidentified comparable form
  - †Inoceramus turgidus – type locality for species
  - †Inoceramus vancouverensis
  - †Inoceramus whitneyi – or unidentified related form
- †Inoperna
  - †Inoperna bellarugosa
- †Inyoceras
  - †Inyoceras bittneri – type locality for species
  - †Inyoceras multicameratus – type locality for species
- †Inyoites – type locality for genus
  - †Inyoites oweni – type locality for species
- Isocrinus
  - †Isocrinus californicus
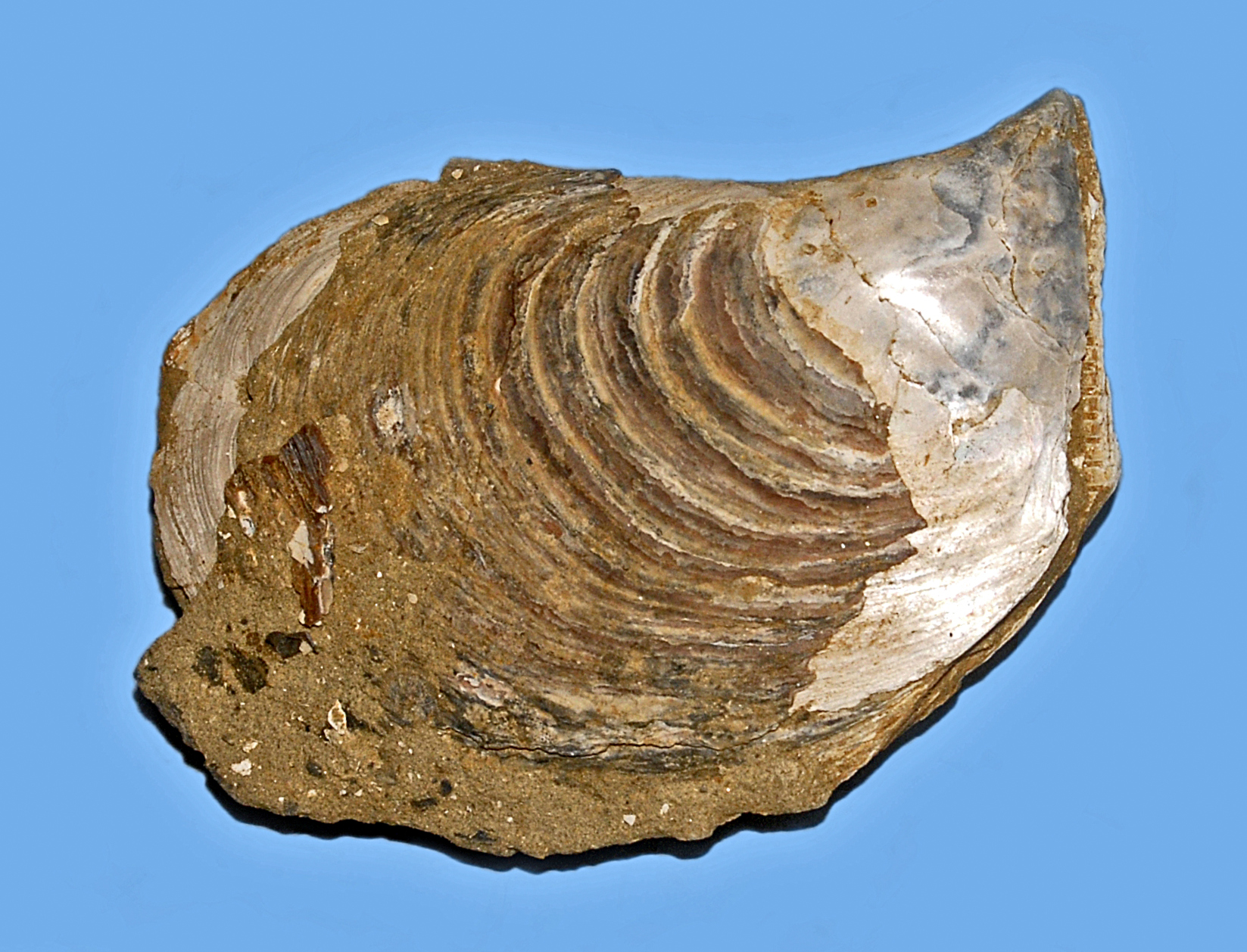
- Fossilized shell of the Permian-modern marine bivalve Isognomon
  Isognomon
  - †Isognomon – type locality for species – informal

== J ==
- †Jeanbesseiceras – tentative report
  - †Jeanbesseiceras jacksoni
- †Joaquinites – type locality for genus
  - †Joaquinites fascicostatum – type locality for species
- †Jovites
  - †Jovites pacificus – type locality for species
- Jupiteria
- †Juvavites
  - †Juvavites knowltoni
  - †Juvavites subinterruptus
- †Juvenites
  - †Juvenites dieneri – type locality for species

== K ==
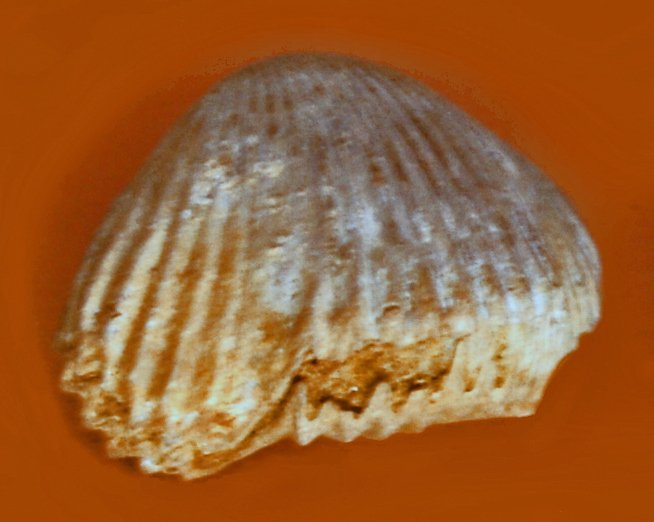
- Fossilized shells of the Jurassic brachiopod Kallirhynchia
  †Kallirhynchia
  - †Kallirhynchia phylarchus – type locality for species
  - †Kallirhynchia valliculae – type locality for species
- †Katroma
  - †Katroma neagui – or unidentified related form
- †Keyserlingites
  - †Keyserlingites pacificus – type locality for species
  - †Keyserlingites subrobustus
- †Kilianella
  - †Kilianella crassiplicata
- †Kilinora
  - †Kilinora catenarum
  - †Kilinora spiralis
- †Klamathites
  - †Klamathites kellyi
  - †Klamathites schucherti – type locality for species
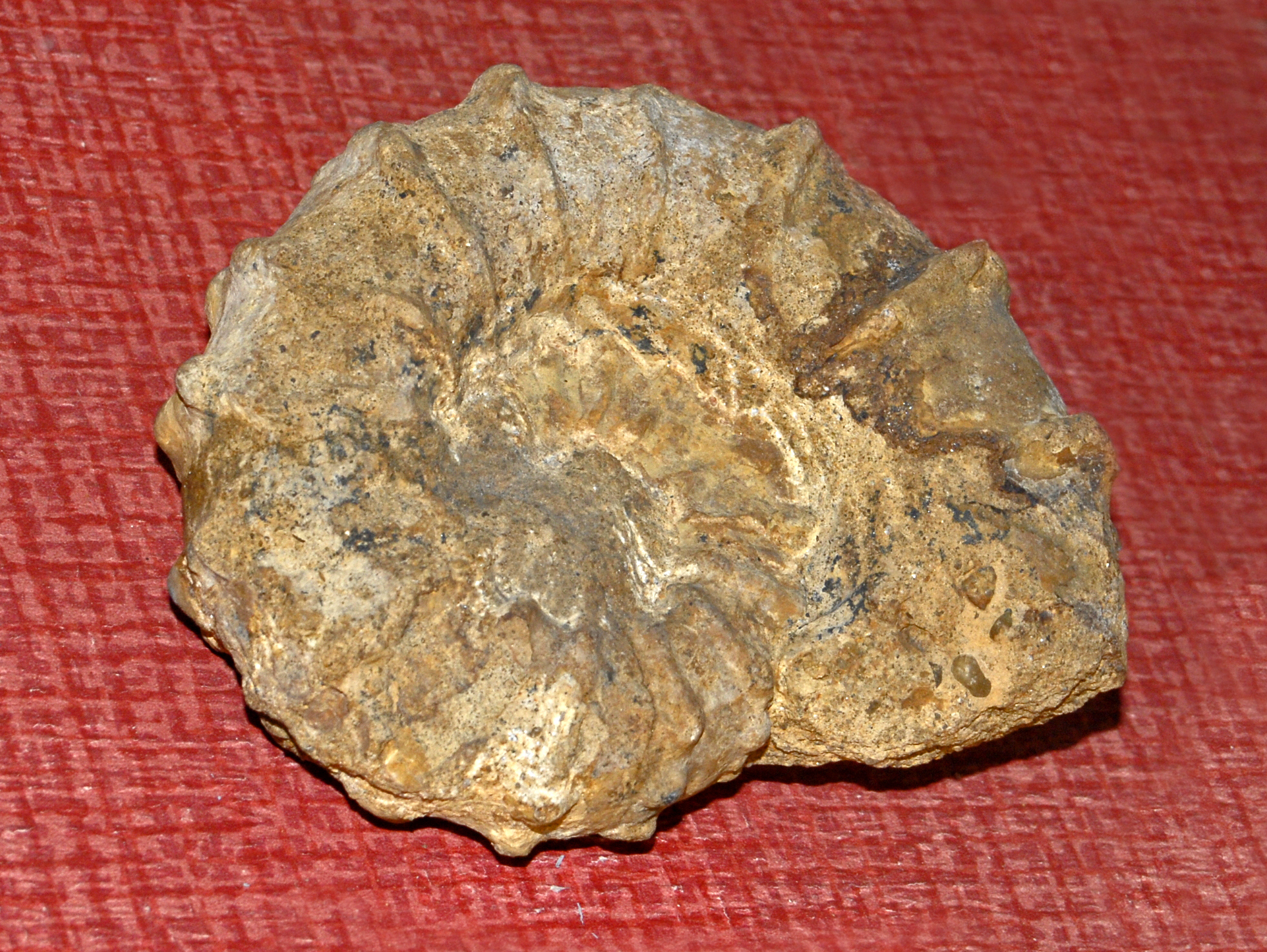
- Fossilized shell of the Early Cretaceous ammonoid cephalopod Kossmaticeras
  †Kossmaticeras
  - †Kossmaticeras japonicum – or unidentified related form
- †Kozurium
  - †Kozurium corningensis
  - †Kozurium zingulai
- †Kuhnastraea
  - †Kuhnastraea decussata

== L ==
- †Laballa
  - †Laballa suessi – or unidentified comparable form
- †Lacunaria
  - †Lacunaria striata
- †Lampasa
  - †Lampasa blomei
- †Lanceolites – type locality for genus
  - †Lanceolites bicarinatus
  - †Lanceolites compactus
- †Lanubus
- Laternula – tentative report
  - †Laternula alisoensis
- †Latidorsella
  - †Latidorsella barryae – type locality for species
- †Latimaeandra – report made of unidentified related form or using admittedly obsolete nomenclature
  - †Latimaeandra eucystis
- †Leconteia – type locality for genus
  - †Leconteia californica – type locality for species
- †Leconteiceras
  - †Leconteiceras occidentale – type locality for species
- †Leconteites
  - †Leconteites lecontei – tentative report
- Leda – tentative report
  - †Leda translucidus – tentative report
- †Legumen
  - †Legumen ooides
- †Leptosolen
- †Leugeo
  - †Leugeo ordinarius
  - †Leugeo parvispinata
- †Levileugeo
- Lima
  - †Lima – type locality for species A – informal
  - †Lima beta
  - †Lima costata
  - †Lima kimballi – type locality for species
  - †Lima terqueni
- Limopsis
  - †Limopsis silveradoensis
- †Linaresia
- †Linearis
  - †Linearis multicostata – or unidentified comparable form
- †Lingula
- †Lipmanium – tentative report
  - †Lipmanium caseyi
- †Lisopithia
  - †Lisopithia ana
- †Lispodesthes
  - †Lispodesthes rotundatus
  - †Lispodesthes rotundus
- †Lithiotis
  - †Lithiotis problematica
- †Lithomphalus
  - †Lithomphalus enderlini
- Lithophaga
- †Loboidothyris
  - †Loboidothyris meeki – type locality for species
  - †Loboidothyris mormonensis – type locality for species
- †Longoconcha – tentative report
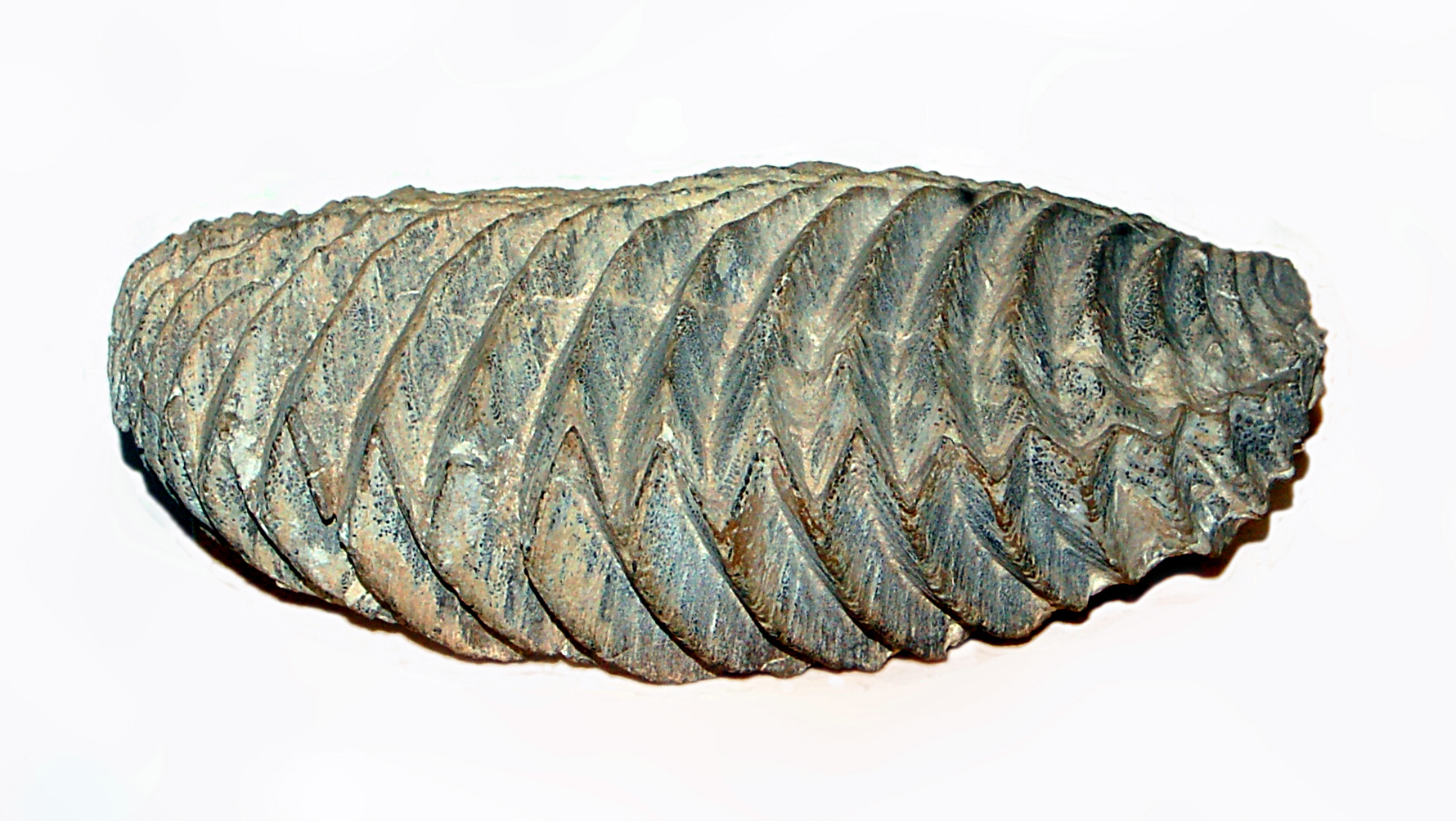
- Fossilized shell of the Triassic-modern marine bivalve Lopha
  Lopha
- Loripes – tentative report
  - †Loripes dubia
- †Loxo
  - †Loxo decore
- †Lucina
- †Lyriochlamys
  - †Lyriochlamys traskii
- †Lysis
  - †Lysis californica
  - †Lysis duplicosta
  - †Lysis suciensis – or unidentified comparable form
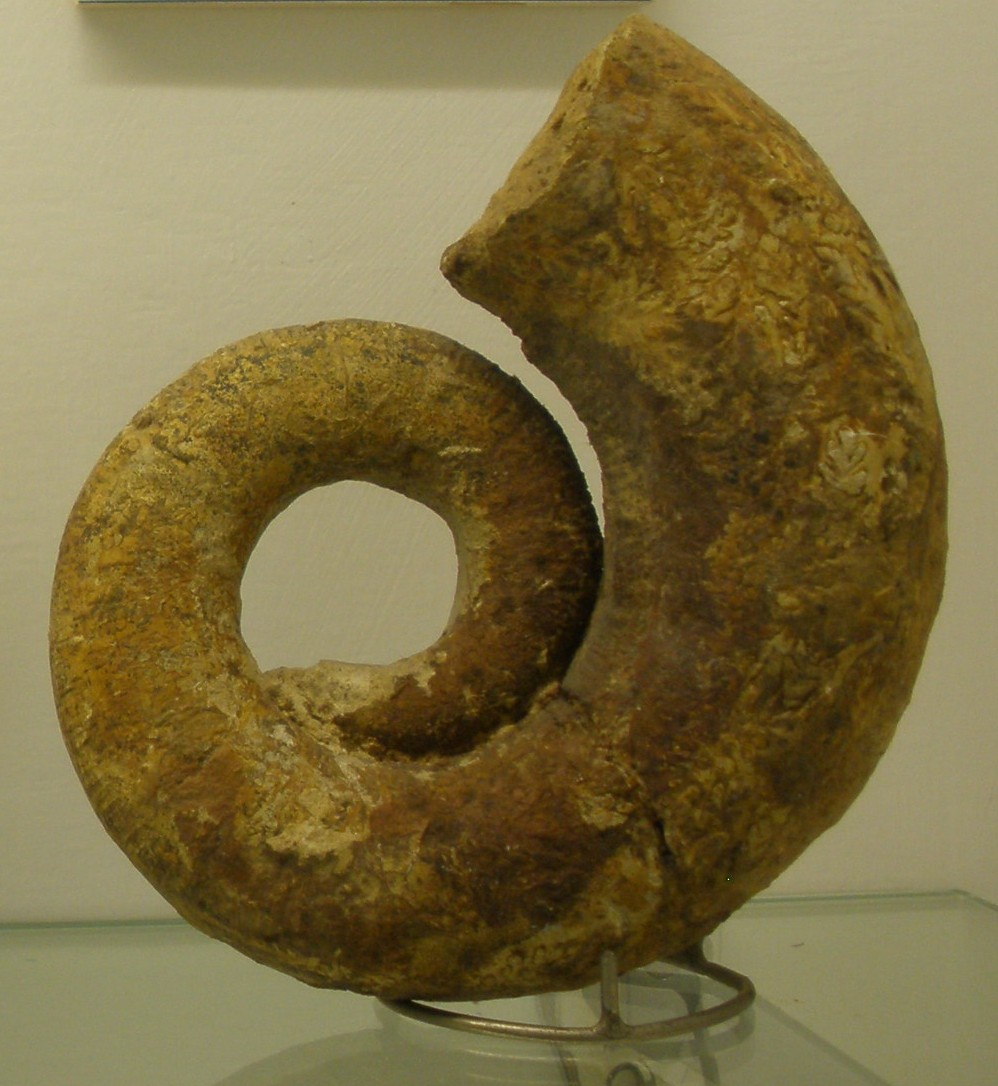
- Fossilized shell of the Early Jurassic-Late Cretaceous ammonoid cephalopod Lytoceras
  †Lytoceras
  - †Lytoceras aulaeum
  - †Lytoceras batesi
  - †Lytoceras saturnale
  - †Lytoceras traski – or unidentified comparable form
  - †Lytoceras whitneyi

== M ==
- Macrocallista
  - †Macrocallista cordata – or unidentified related form
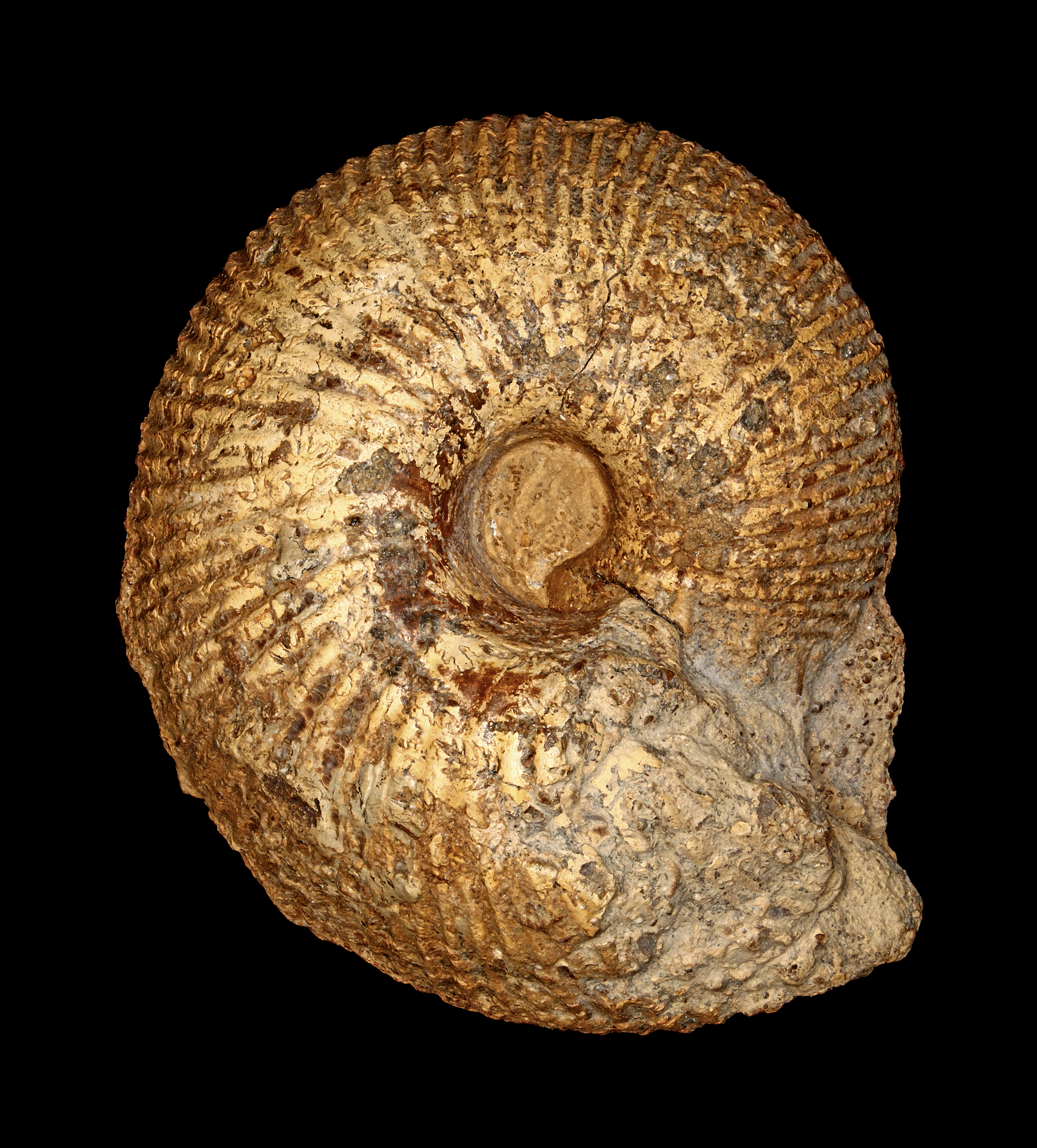
- Fossilized shell of the Middle Jurassic ammonoid cephalopod Macrocephalites
  †Macrocephalites
- †Madrasites
  - †Madrasites voyanum – type locality for species
- †Mammites – tentative report
- †Mantelliceras
  - †Mantelliceras lecontei – or unidentified comparable form
- Margarella
  - †Margarella crenulata
- †Margariella – tentative report
- †Margaritella
  - †Margaritella globosa
- Margarites
  - †Margarites inornatus
  - †Margarites ornatissima
  - †Margarites senilis
  - †Margarites septentrionalis – type locality for species
- †Margaritropites
  - †Margaritropites johnsoni – type locality for species
  - †Margaritropites kokeni – type locality for species
- †Marginotruncana
  - †Marginotruncana marginata
  - †Marginotruncana renzi
- Marginulina
  - †Marginulina elongata
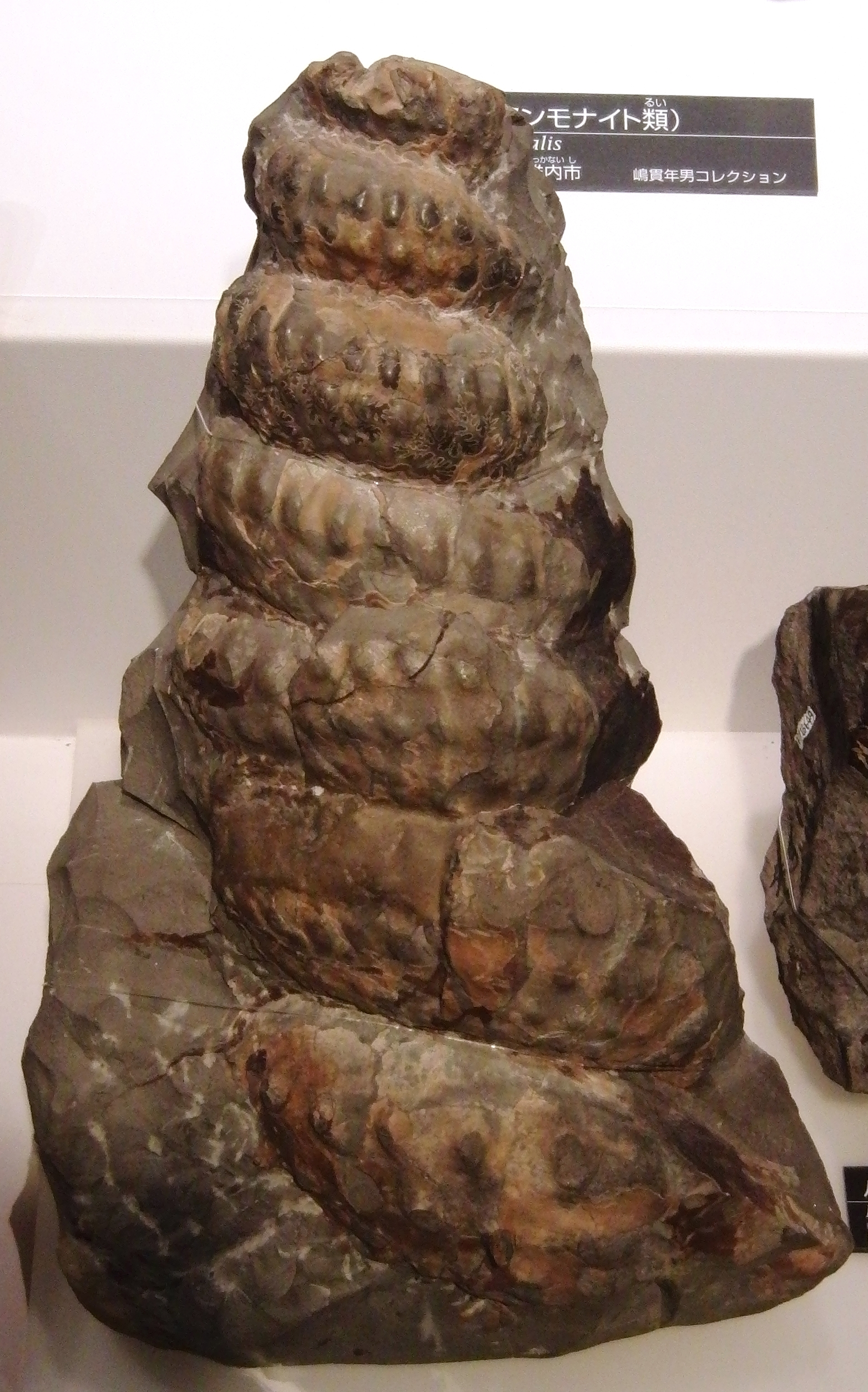
- Fossilized shell of the Early-Late Cretaceous ammonoid cephalopod Mariella
  †Mariella
  - †Mariella bergeri
  - †Mariella fricki
- Martesia
  - †Martesia clausa
- †Mataxa
  - †Mataxa arida – type locality for species
- †Mediaster
  - †Mediaster hayi – type locality for species
- †Meekia
  - †Meekia bella
  - †Meekia daileyi
  - †Meekia iberica
  - †Meekia lirata – tentative report
  - †Meekia louella
  - †Meekia mygale
  - †Meekia radiata
  - †Meekia sella
  - †Meekia takeoana – tentative report
- †Meekoceras
  - †Meekoceras gracilitatis
  - †Meekoceras newberryi
  - †Meekoceras strongi
- †Melchiorites
  - †Melchiorites shastensis
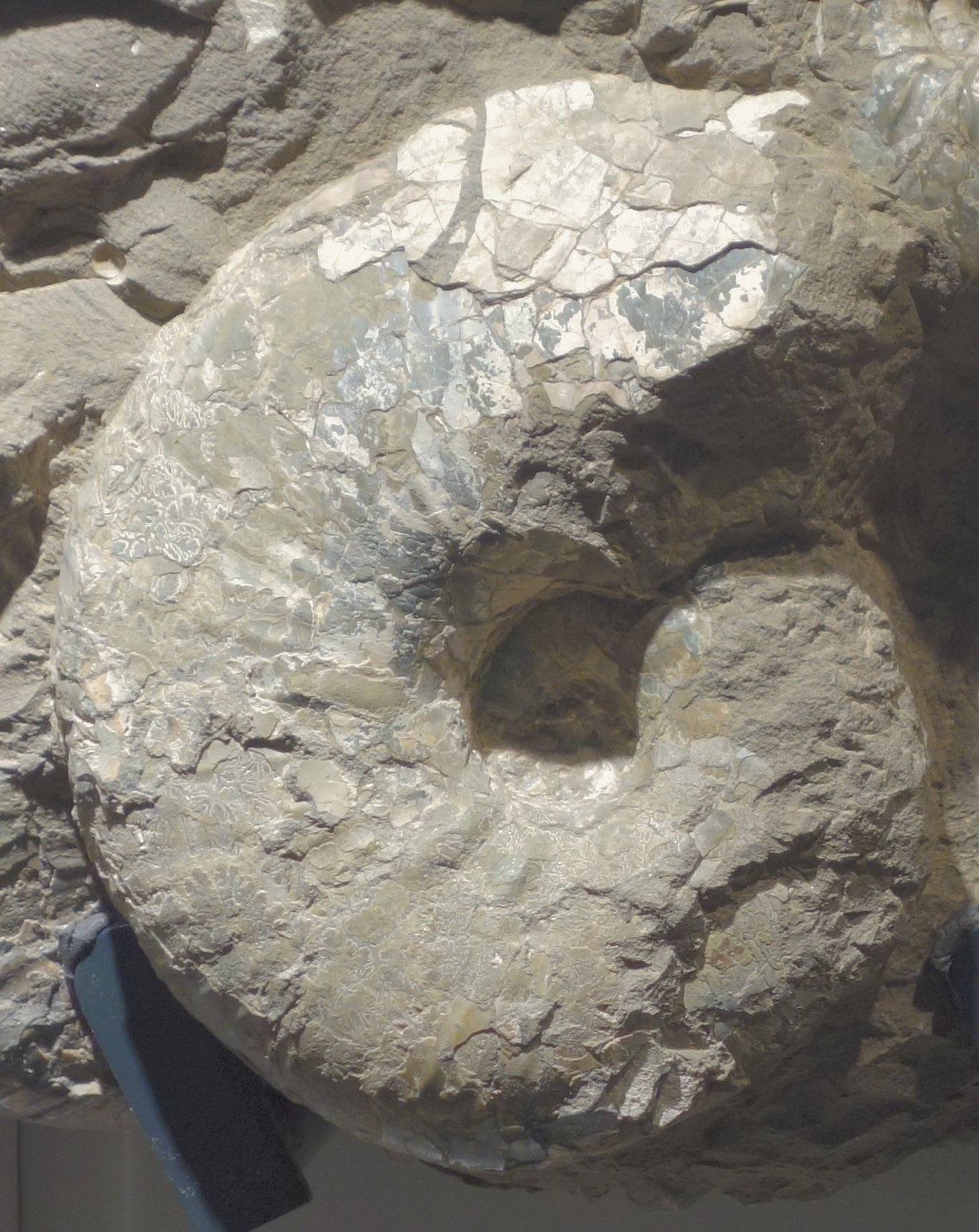
- Assemblage of fossilized shells of the Late Cretaceous ammonoid cephalopod Menuites
  †Menuites
  - †Menuites arrialoorensis – or unidentified related form
  - †Menuites siskiyouensis
- †Merriamia
  - †Merriamia zitteli
- †Mesopuzosia
  - †Mesopuzosia colusaense
  - †Mesopuzosia intermedia – or unidentified comparable form
  - †Mesopuzosia pacifica – or unidentified comparable form
- †Metacerithium – tentative report
- †Metaplacenticeras
  - †Metaplacenticeras californicum
  - †Metaplacenticeras pacificum
  - †Metaplacenticeras transitionale
- †Metasibirites
  - †Metasibirites brockensis – type locality for species
  - †Metasibirites coei – type locality for species
  - †Metasibirites frechi – type locality for species
  - †Metasibirites gracilis – type locality for species
  - †Metasibirites modestus – type locality for species
  - †Metasibirites mojsvarensis – type locality for species
  - †Metasibirites pusillus – type locality for species
  - †Metasibirites pygmaeus – type locality for species
  - †Metasibirites shastensis – type locality for species
- †Metatirolites
  - †Metatirolites foliaceus
  - †Metatirolites quadrangulus
  - †Metatirolites subpygmaeus
- †Microsciadiocapsa
  - †Microsciadiocapsa sutterensis
- †Microtropites
  - †Microtropites tubercularis
- †Millerocaulis
  - †Millerocaulis embreei – type locality for species
- †Minasteria – report made of unidentified related form or using admittedly obsolete nomenclature
  - †Minasteria shastensis
- †Minocapsa
  - †Minocapsa aitai
  - †Minocapsa tansinhoki
- †Minytropis
  - †Minytropis melilota
- †Mirifusus
  - †Mirifusus baileyi
  - †Mirifusus chenodes – or unidentified related form
  - †Mirifusus fragilis
  - †Mirifusus guadalupensis
  - †Mirifusus mediodilatatus
- † Mita – tentative report
- † Mita
  - †Mita magnifica
- †Modiolus
  - †Modiolus cylindricus
  - †Modiolus sikiyouensis
  - †Modiolus siskiyouensis
- †Mojsvaroceras
  - †Mojsvaroceras turneri – type locality for species
- †Monotis
  - †Monotis subcircularis
- †Morenosaurus – type locality for genus
  - †Morenosaurus stocki – type locality for species
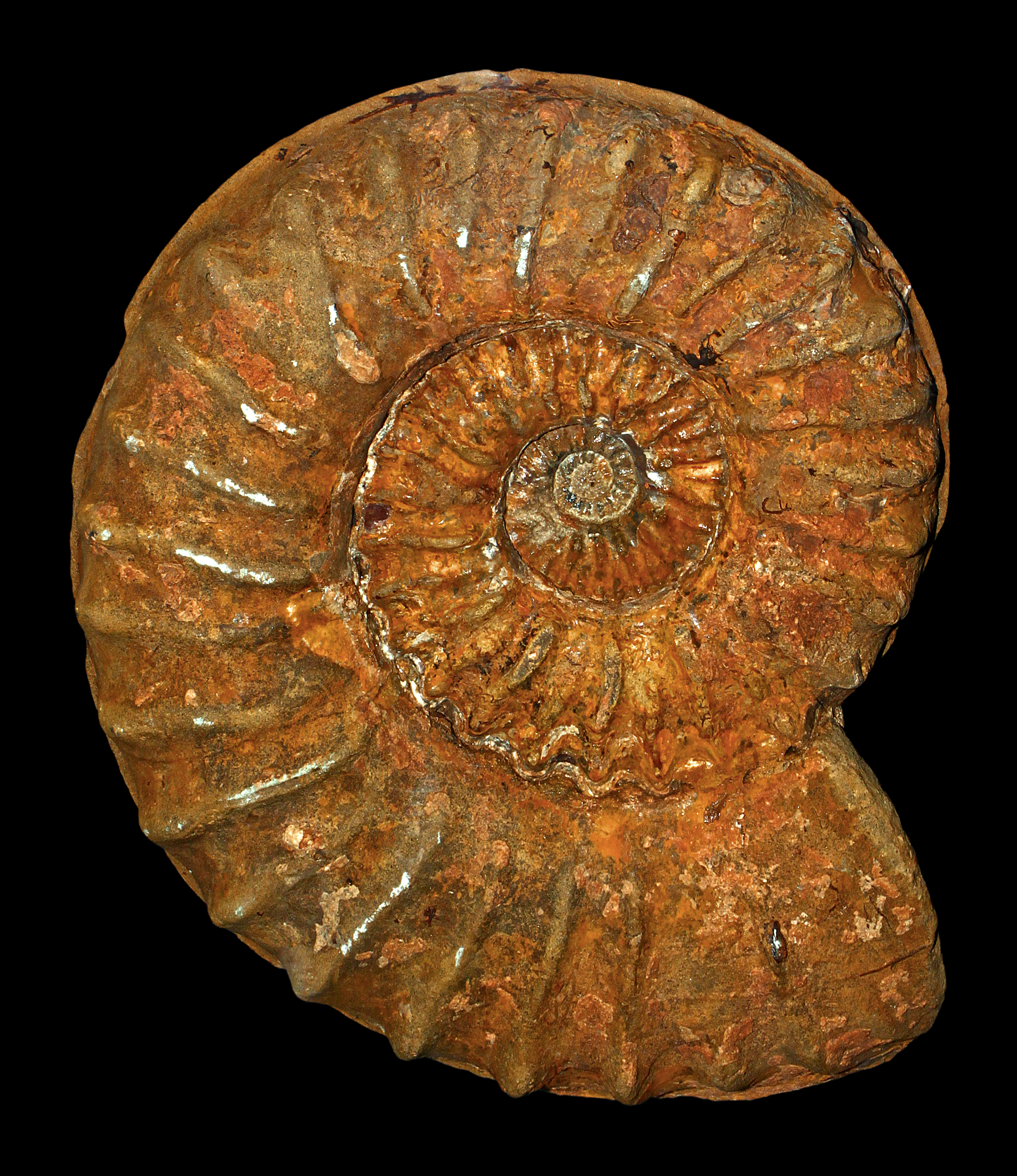
- Fossilized shell of the Early Cretaceous ammonoid cephalopod Mortoniceras
  †Mortoniceras
  - †Mortoniceras chicoense
  - †Mortoniceras gainesana
  - †Mortoniceras inflata
  - †Mortoniceras kiliani
  - †Mortoniceras tehamaensis
- †Msopuzosia
  - †Msopuzosia densicostata – or unidentified comparable form
- †Murphitys – type locality for genus
  - †Murphitys corona – type locality for species
  - †Murphitys madonna – type locality for species
  - †Murphitys michaeli – type locality for species
- Musculus – or unidentified related form
- †Myoconcha
  - †Myoconcha nana
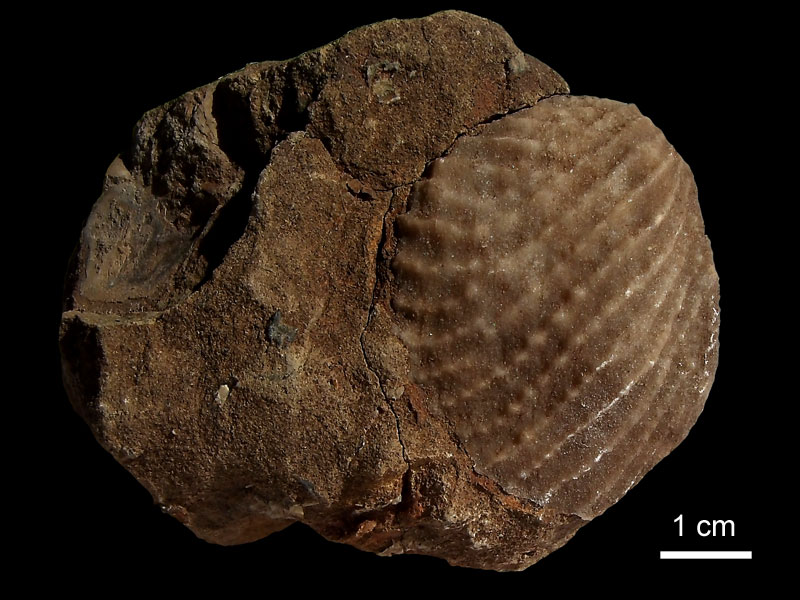
- Fossilized shell of the Jurassic-Cretaceous marine bivalve Myophorella
  †Myophorella
  - †Myophorella argo
  - †Myophorella dawsoni – or unidentified related form
  - †Myophorella yellowstonensis
- †Myophoria
  - †Myophoria brockensis – type locality for species
- Myrtea
  - †Myrtea gabbi – tentative report
- †Mytiloides
  - †Mytiloides labiatus
  - †Mytiloides mytiloides
  - †Mytiloides opalensis
  - †Mytiloides stantoni – or unidentified comparable form
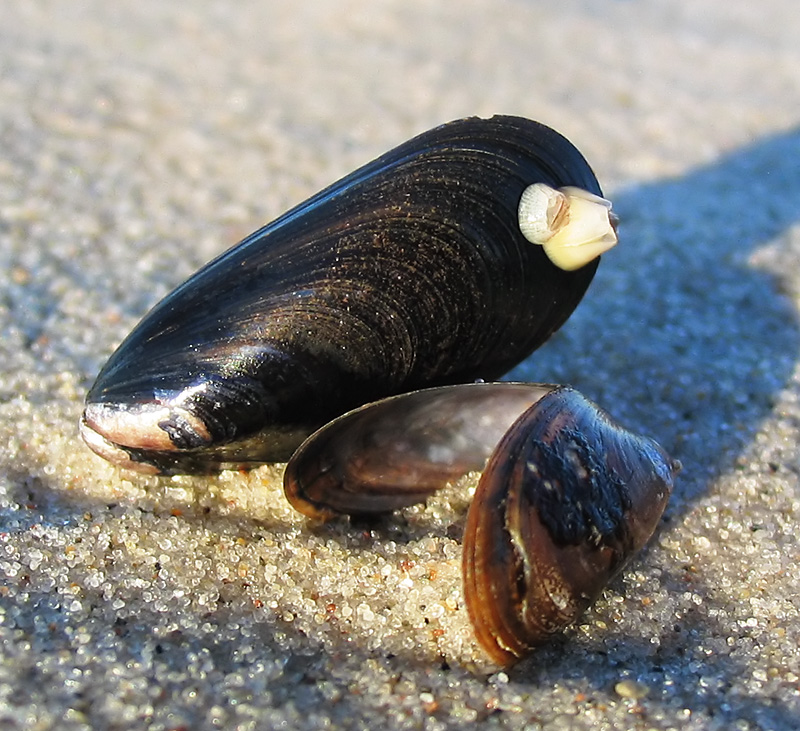
- Shells washed ashore of Mytilus mussels
  †Mytilus
  - †Mytilus pauperculus – or unidentified comparable form
  - †Mytilus quadratus
  - †Mytilus ursensis – type locality for species

== N ==
- †Nanonavis
  - †Nanonavis breweriana
- Napora
  - †Napora bearensis – or unidentified comparable form
  - †Napora bukryi
  - †Napora collieri
  - †Napora dumitricai
  - †Napora durhami
  - †Napora elkcampensis
  - †Napora espinosa
  - †Napora latissima – or unidentified related form
  - †Napora lomoalta
  - †Napora nipponica
  - †Napora pacifica
  - †Napora praespinifera
  - †Napora pyramidalis
  - †Napora redonda
  - †Napora saginata – or unidentified related form
  - †Napora sixi
  - †Napora spinifera
- Natica
  - †Natica allisoni
  - †Natica conradiana
- †Navahopus
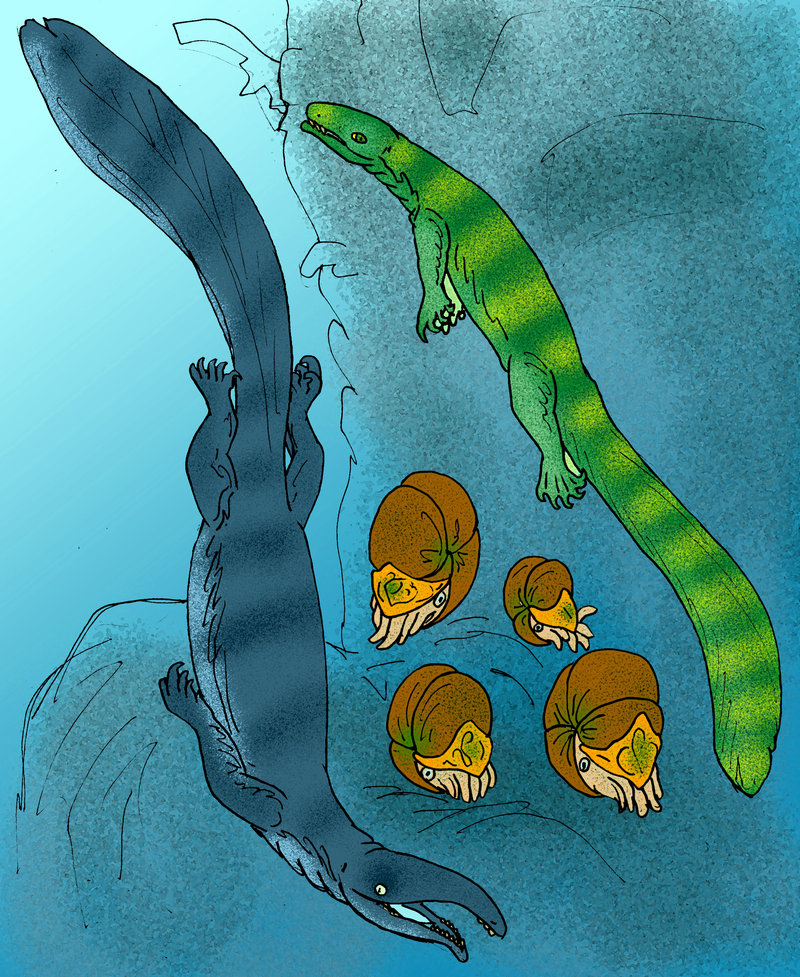
- Life restoration of the Late Triassic thalattosaurs Nectosaurus (right) and Thalattosaurus
  †Nectosaurus
- †Neithea
  - †Neithea grandicosta
- †Nelltia
  - †Nelltia roddana – tentative report
  - †Nelltia salsa – type locality for species
- †Nemodon
- †Neocardioceras – tentative report
- †Neohibolites
  - †Neohibolites fontinalis
- †Neoparonaella
  - †Neoparonaella delicata
- †Neophylloceras
  - †Neophylloceras hetonaiense
  - †Neophylloceras ramosum
  - †Neophylloceras vaculae
- †Neopopanoceras
  - †Neopopanoceras haugi – type locality for species
- †Neopuzosia
  - †Neopuzosia ishikawai
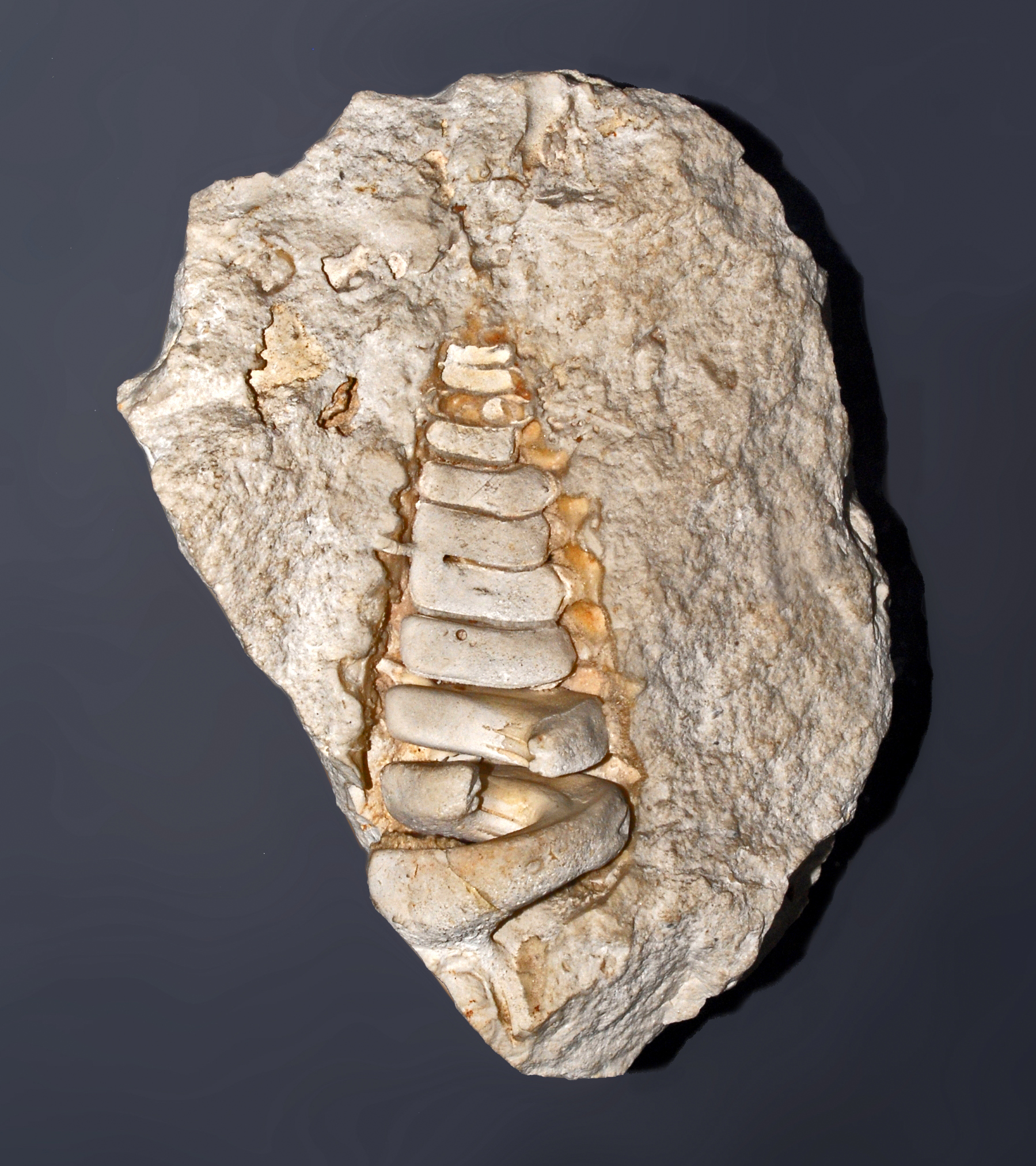
- Fossilized shell of the Jurassic-Cretaceous sea snail Nerinea
  †Nerinea
  - †Nerinea stewarti – type locality for species
- †Nerinella
  - †Nerinella santana – type locality for species
- Nerita
  - †Nerita orovillensis – tentative report
- Nodosarella
- Nodosaria
  - †Nodosaria monile
  - †Nodosaria pomuligera
  - †Nodosaria spinifera
- †Nolita
  - †Nolita ramosa
- †Nonactaeonina
  - †Nonactaeonina obesa
  - †Nonactaeonina tensa – or unidentified comparable form
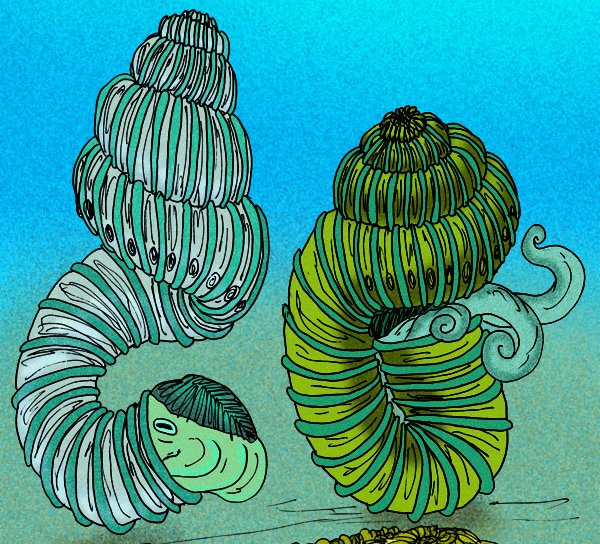
- Restoration of several species of the Late Cretaceous ammonoid cephalopod Nostoceras
  †Nostoceras
  - †Nostoceras excelsus – type locality for species
  - †Nostoceras splendidum
- †Notidanodon
  - †Notidanodon lanceolatus
- †Notodonax
  - †Notodonax bolsae
- †Novitripus
  - †Novitripus placitus
  - †Novitripus varius
- †Novixitus
  - †Novixitus jurassicus
  - †Novixitus mclaughlini
- †Nowakites
  - †Nowakites dobbinsi – type locality for species
  - †Nowakites klamathonis – type locality for species
  - †Nowakites puertoensis – type locality for species
  - †Nowakites rumseyensis – type locality for species
- Nucinella
- Nucleolites – report made of unidentified related form or using admittedly obsolete nomenclature
  - †Nucleolites mercedensis
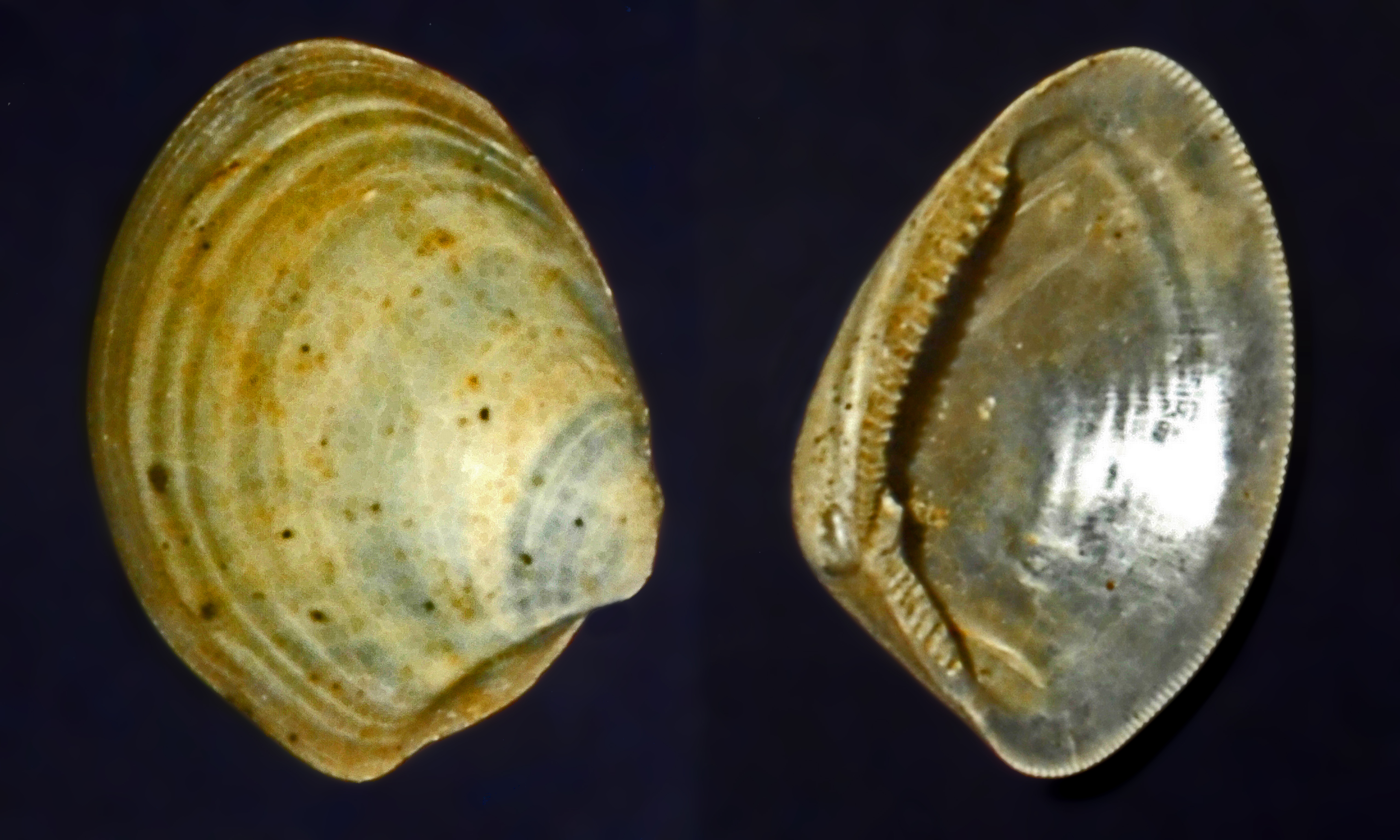
- Interior of a fossilized shell of the Early Ordovician-modern marine bivalve Nucula
  Nucula
  - †Nucula gabbi
  - †Nucula storrsi
- Nuculana
  - †Nuculana grandensis – or unidentified related form
  - †Nuculana translucida
- †Nudivagus – tentative report
  - †Nudivagus califus – type locality for species

== O ==
- †Obesacapsula
  - †Obesacapsula cetia
  - †Obesacapsula morroensis
  - †Obesacapsula rotunda
- †Obnixia – type locality for genus
  - †Obnixia thaynesiana
- †Octopodichnus
- †Olanda
  - †Olanda olorina
- †Omphaloptycha
  - †Omphaloptycha obesa – type locality for species
  - †Omphaloptycha shastensis – type locality for species
- Opalia
- †Ophiceras
  - †Ophiceras involutum
- †Opis
  - †Opis anae – type locality for species
  - †Opis californica – type locality for species
  - †Opis holzana
  - †Opis pacifica
  - †Opis popenoei – type locality for species
  - †Opis rosarioensis
  - †Opis triangulata – type locality for species
  - †Opis vancouverensis
- †Orbiculiforma
  - †Orbiculiforma maxima
  - †Orbiculiforma multangula
  - †Orbiculiforma nevadaensis
  - †Orbiculiforma railensis
- †Orbiculiformella
  - †Orbiculiformella teres
- †Ornithella
  - †Ornithella curticensis – type locality for species
  - †Ornithella gemina – type locality for species
  - †Ornithella syringothyrides – type locality for species
- †Orthoceras
  - †Orthoceras shastense – type locality for species
- †Orthotrigonia
- Ostrea
  - †Ostrea crescentica
- †Owenites
  - †Owenites carpenteri
  - †Owenites koeneni – type locality for species
- †Oxybeloceras
  - †Oxybeloceras petrolense
  - †Oxybeloceras taffi – type locality for species
- †Oxyeurax
  - †Oxyeurax trapezoidalis
- †Oxynautilus
  - †Oxynautilus acutus
- †Oxytoma
- †Oxytropidoceras
  - †Oxytropidoceras peruvianum

== P ==
- †Pachecocrinus
- †Pachydesmoceras
  - †Pachydesmoceras colusaense
  - †Pachydesmoceras pachydiscoide – type locality for species
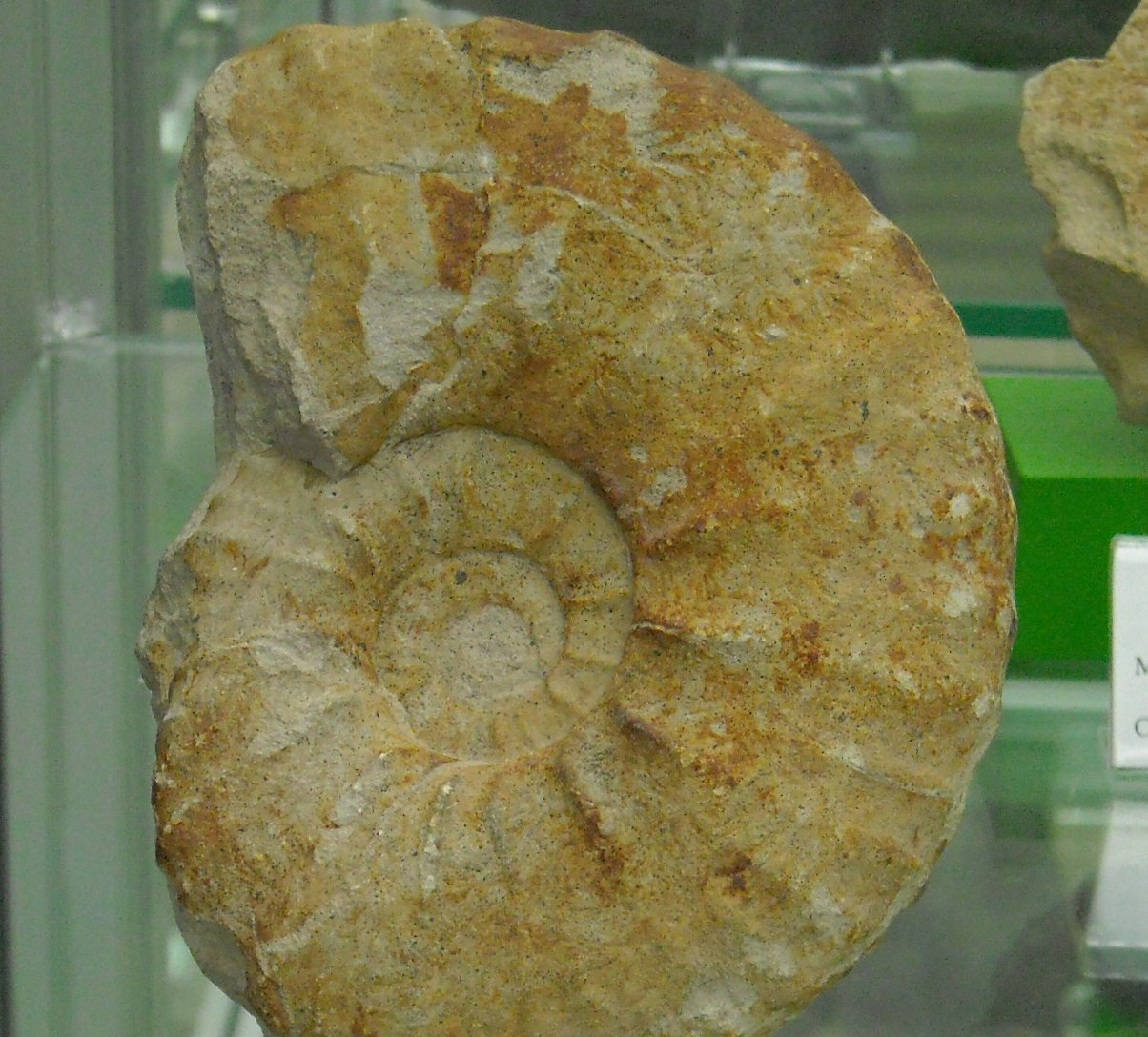
- Fossilized shell of the Late Cretaceous ammonoid cephalopod Pachydiscus
  †Pachydiscus
  - †Pachydiscus ashlandicus – or unidentified related form
  - †Pachydiscus averilli – type locality for species
  - †Pachydiscus binodatus – or unidentified comparable form
  - †Pachydiscus buckhami
  - †Pachydiscus catarinae – or unidentified related form
  - †Pachydiscus coalingense
  - †Pachydiscus egertoni – or unidentified comparable form
  - †Pachydiscus henleyensis
  - †Pachydiscus japonicus – or unidentified comparable form
  - †Pachydiscus neevesi – or unidentified comparable form
  - †Pachydiscus ootacodensis
  - †Pachydiscus subcompressus
- †Pachyoncus
  - †Pachyoncus kamiasoensis
- †Paladmete – tentative report
- †Palaeastraea – report made of unidentified related form or using admittedly obsolete nomenclature
  - †Palaeastraea grandissima
- †Palaeobates
  - †Palaeobates shastensis – type locality for species
- †Palaeocypraea
  - †Palaeocypraea fontana – type locality for species
  - †Palaeocypraea wilfredi – type locality for species
- †Palaeomoera
  - †Palaeomoera dyskritos
- †Paleopsephaea
  - †Paleopsephaea sacramentica
- †Paleotractus
  - †Paleotractus crassus
- †Palinandromeda
  - †Palinandromeda fimbria
  - †Palinandromeda podbielensis
- Panopea
  - †Panopea californica – or unidentified related form
- †Pantanellium
  - †Pantanellium buntonense – or unidentified comparable form
  - †Pantanellium darlingtonense
  - †Pantanellium deflectum
  - †Pantanellium fishcreekensis
  - †Pantanellium foveatum
  - †Pantanellium josephinense
  - †Pantanellium meraceibaense
  - †Pantanellium rarum
  - †Pantanellium riedeli
  - †Pantanellium squinaboli
  - †Pantanellium ultrasincerum
- †Paraganides – type locality for genus
  - †Paraganides californicus – type locality for species
- †Parahauerites
  - †Parahauerites ashleyi – type locality for species
- †Parahoplites
  - †Parahoplites sjogreni – or unidentified related form
- †Parahsuum
  - †Parahsuum izeense
  - †Parahsuum mostleri
  - †Parahsuum ovale
  - †Parahsuum publicum
  - †Parahsuum simplum
  - †Parahsuum stanleyense
  - †Parahsuum transiens – or unidentified comparable form
- †Parallelodon
  - †Parallelodon brewerianus
  - †Parallelodon vancouverensis
- †Paranannites
  - †Paranannites oviformis – type locality for species
- †Parapachydiscus
  - †Parapachydiscus bidwelli – type locality for species
  - †Parapachydiscus catarinae
  - †Parapachydiscus cortinaensis – type locality for species
  - †Parapachydiscus panochensis – type locality for species
  - †Parapachydiscus peninsularis – or unidentified related form
  - †Parapachydiscus stanislausensis – type locality for species
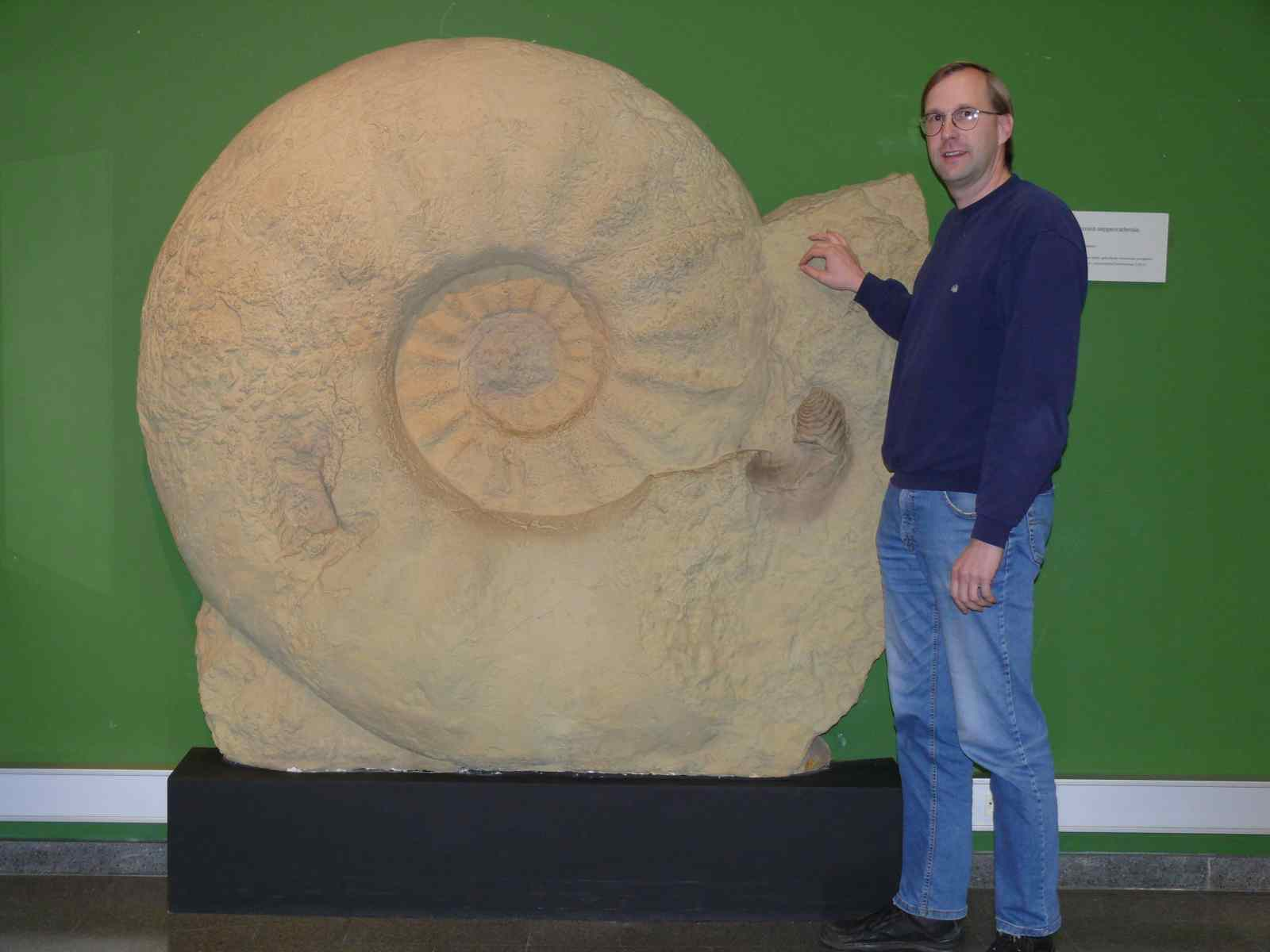
- Fossilized shell of the Late Cretaceous ammonoid cephalopod Parapuzosia with a human indicating its size
  †Parapuzosia
  - †Parapuzosia arenaica – type locality for species
  - †Parapuzosia giganteum – type locality for species
  - †Parapuzosia hearni – type locality for species
  - †Parapuzosia hindsi – type locality for species
  - †Parapuzosia klamathonrae – type locality for species
  - †Parapuzosia waringi
- †Paratropites
  - †Paratropites colei
  - †Paratropites shastensis
- †Parisculites
  - †Parisculites obolinus
- †Paronaella
  - †Paronaella aranae
  - †Paronaella bandyi
  - †Paronaella broennimanni – or unidentified related form
  - †Paronaella cleopatraensis
  - †Paronaella coalescenda
  - †Paronaella egregia
  - †Paronaella inornata
  - †Paronaella nipomoensis
  - †Paronaella obesa
  - †Paronaella panda
  - †Paronaella solanoensis – or unidentified comparable form
- †Partschiceras
  - †Partschiceras grantzi – or unidentified comparable form
- †Parussuria
  - †Parussuria compressa – type locality for species
- Parvamussium
- †Parvicingula
  - †Parvicingula alamoensis
  - †Parvicingula blowi
  - †Parvicingula bluefordae
  - †Parvicingula boesi
  - †Parvicingula broqueta
  - †Parvicingula citae
  - †Parvicingula colemani
  - †Parvicingula corona
  - †Parvicingula cuyamaensis
  - †Parvicingula deadhorsensis
  - †Parvicingula dhimenaensis – or unidentified related form
  - †Parvicingula excelsa
  - †Parvicingula gorda
  - †Parvicingula gracila
  - †Parvicingula jonesi
  - †Parvicingula khabakovi – or unidentified comparable form
  - †Parvicingula obstinata
  - †Parvicingula rothwelli
  - †Parvicingula sanfilippoae
  - †Parvicingula satura
  - †Parvicingula thomesensis
  - †Parvicingula turrita
  - †Parvicingula whalenae
  - †Parvicingula yehae
- †Parvivacca
  - †Parvivacca coraforma
  - †Parvivacca immodica
  - †Parvivacca marina
  - †Parvivacca robusta
  - †Parvivacca simplex
  - †Parvivacca varica
- †Paskentana
  - †Paskentana berryessaensis – type locality for species
  - †Paskentana globosa – type locality for species
  - †Paskentana paskentaensis
- Patella – report made of unidentified related form or using admittedly obsolete nomenclature
  - †Patella sheehani – type locality for species
  - †Patella stuarti – type locality for species
- †Patulibracchium
  - †Patulibracchium grapevinensis
  - †Patulibracchium henlei – or unidentified related form
- †Paxitropis
  - †Paxitropis dicriota
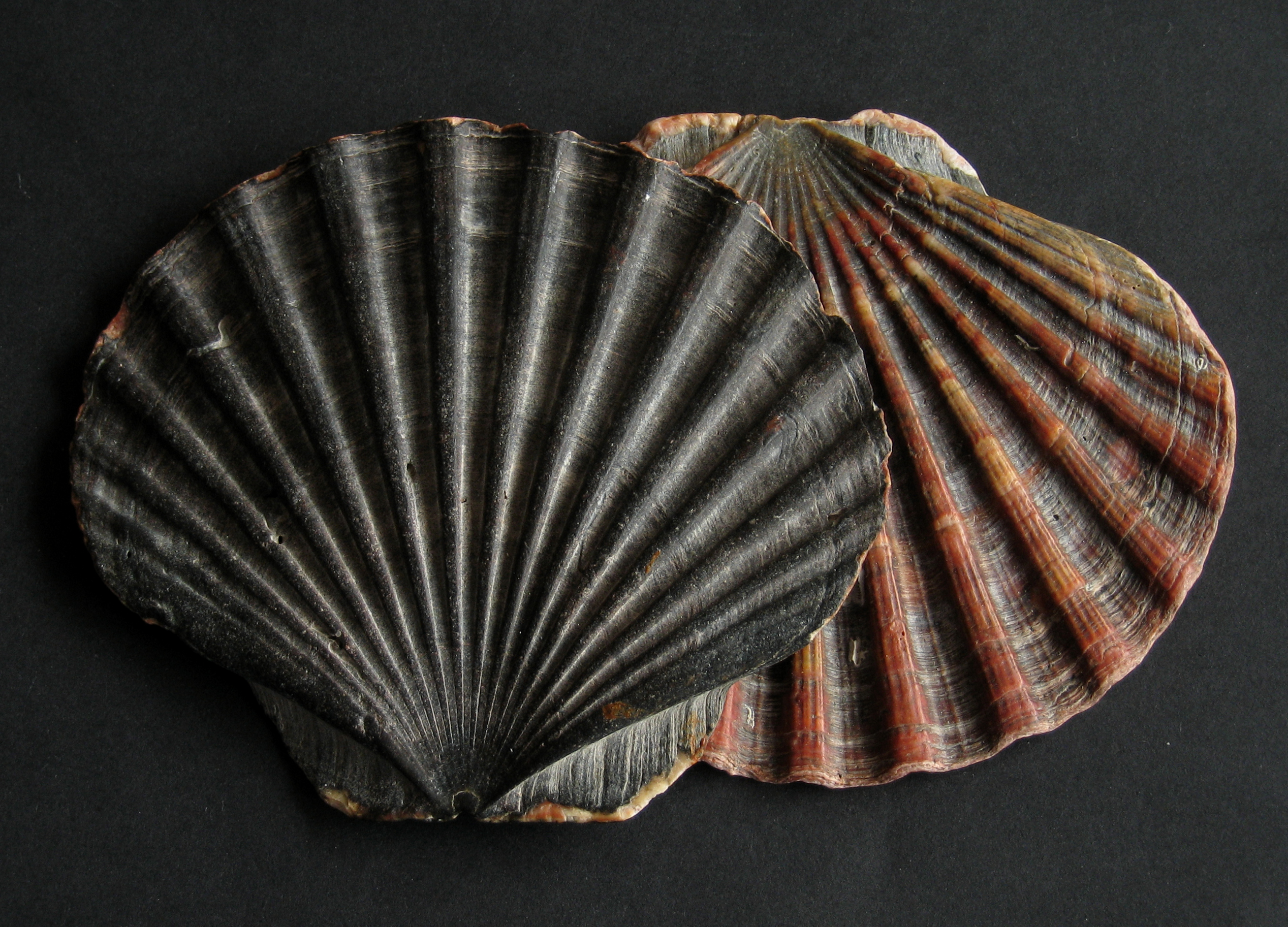
- Shells of Pecten scallops
  †Pecten
  - †Pecten cowperi
  - †Pecten deformis – type locality for species
- †Pedalion
- †Pegaster – type locality for genus
  - †Pegaster stichos – type locality for species
- †Pentacrinus
  - †Pentacrinus asteriscus – tentative report
- †Pentzia
  - †Pentzia hilgardi
- Periploma
  - †Periploma subgracile – or unidentified related form
- †Periplomya – tentative report
- †Perispyridium
  - †Perispyridium alinchakense – or unidentified related form
  - †Perispyridium bacatum
  - †Perispyridium dangerpointense
  - †Perispyridium gujohachimanense
  - †Perispyridium neotamanense
  - †Perispyridium ordinarium
- †Perissitys
  - †Perissitys brevirostris
  - †Perissitys colocara – type locality for species
  - †Perissitys cretacea
  - †Perissitys elaphia – type locality for species
  - †Perissitys pacifica – type locality for species
  - †Perissitys stantoni
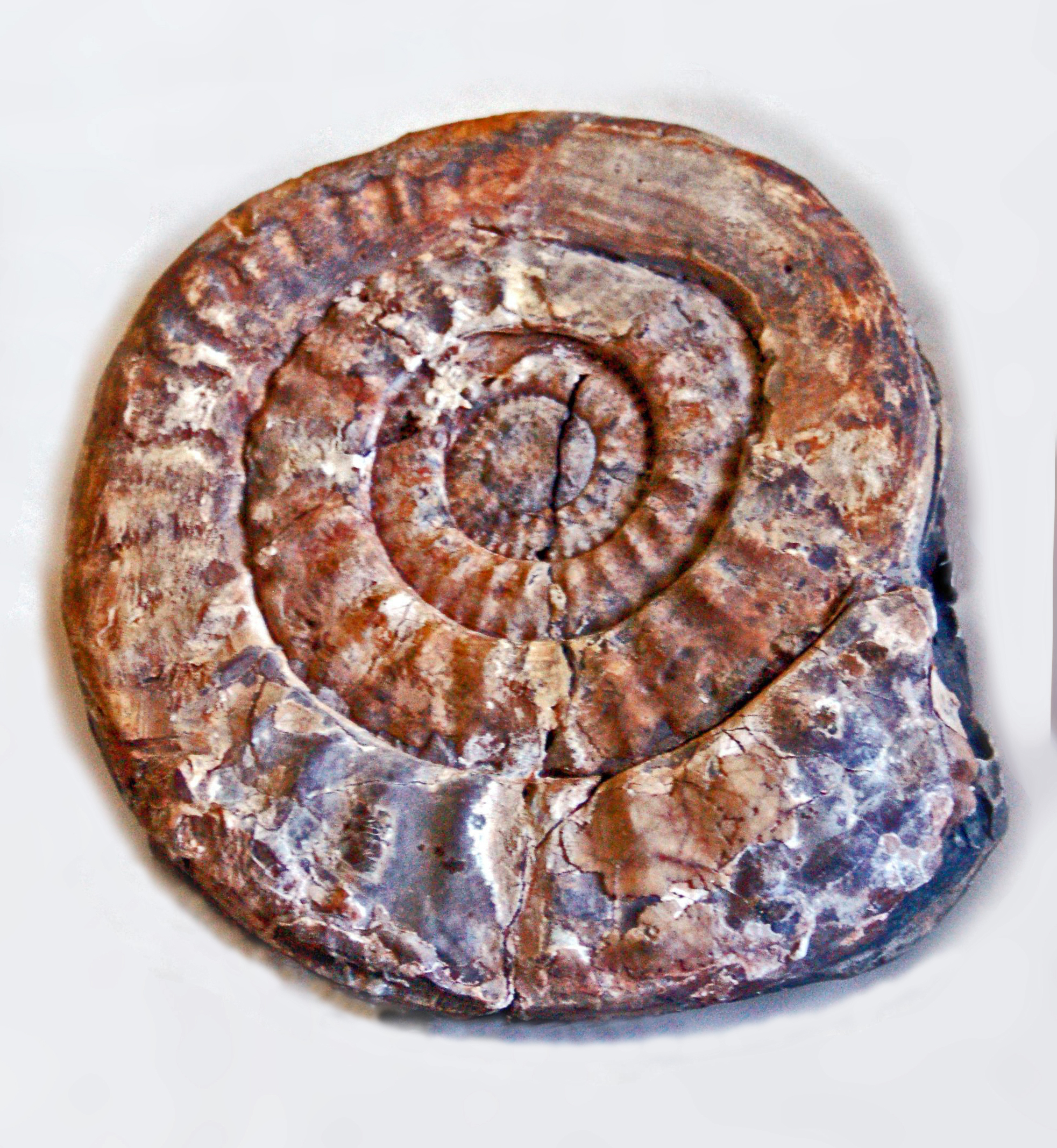
- Fossilized shell of the Late Cretaceous ammonoid cephalopod Peroniceras
  †Peroniceras
  - †Peroniceras leei – or unidentified related form
  - †Peroniceras shastensis
- †Pervinquieria
  - †Pervinquieria furberi – type locality for species
  - †Pervinquieria gainesana – type locality for species
- †Petasiforma
  - †Petasiforma foremanae
  - †Petasiforma inusitata
- Phanerolepida
  - †Phanerolepida onoensis – type locality for species
- †Phantum
  - †Phantum insperatum – or unidentified comparable form
- Pharella
  - †Pharella alta
- †Phelopteria
- †Phillippiella
- Pholadomya
  - †Pholadomya diegoensis – or unidentified comparable form
  - †Pholadomya subelongata
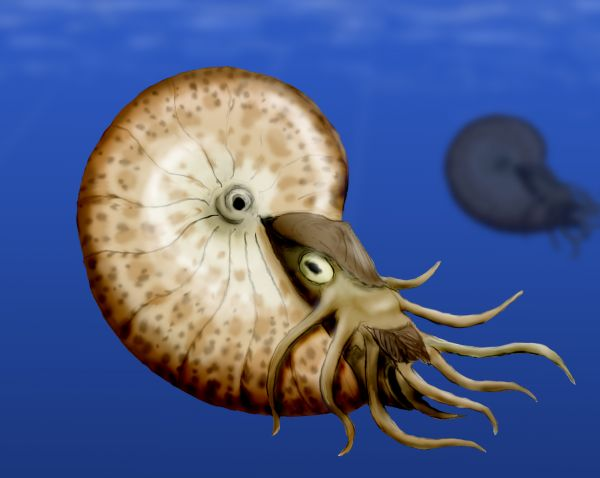
- Life restoration of the Early Jurassic-Late Cretaceous ammonoid cephalopod Phylloceras
  †Phylloceras
  - †Phylloceras gargantuum – type locality for species
  - †Phylloceras pachecoense – type locality for species
  - †Phylloceras velledae
- †Phyllopachyceras
  - †Phyllopachyceras aldersona
- †Piarorhynchia
  - †Piarorhynchia howardi – type locality for species
  - †Piarorhynchia winnemae – type locality for species
- †Piestochilus – tentative report
- †Pinacoceras
  - †Pinacoceras rex
- †Pinna
  - †Pinna calamitoides
  - †Pinna expansa – or unidentified comparable form
- †Pityostrobus
  - †Pityostrobus calforniensis – type locality for species
- †Plesiotylosaurus
  - †Plesiotylosaurus crassidens
- †Pleuromya
- †Pleurotropites
  - †Pleurotropites gabbi – type locality for species
  - †Pleurotropites gracilis – type locality for species
- Plicatula
  - †Plicatula perimbricata
  - †Plicatula variata
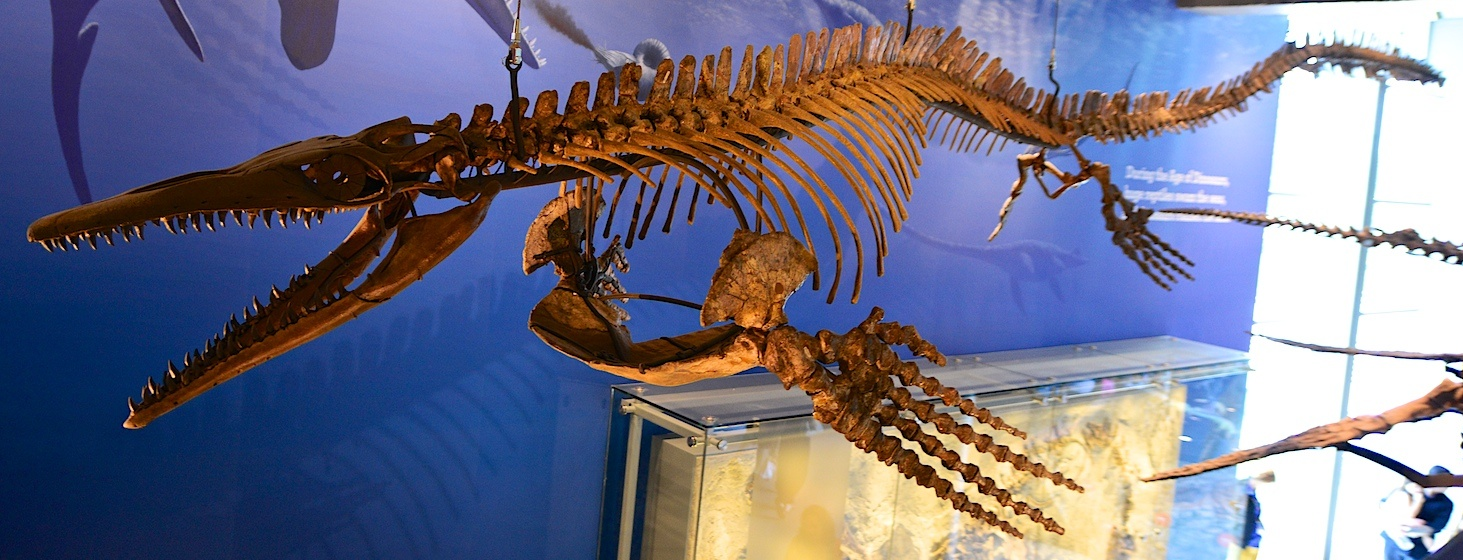
- Mounted fossilized skeleton of the Late Cretaceous mosasaur Plotosaurus
  †Plotosaurus
  - †Plotosaurus bennisoni
  - †Plotosaurus tuckeri
- †Podobursa
  - †Podobursa basilica
  - †Podobursa helvetica
  - †Podobursa lanza
  - †Podobursa rosea
  - †Podobursa spinellifera
  - †Podobursa spinosa
  - †Podobursa tamanensis
  - †Podobursa triacantha
- †Podocapsa
  - †Podocapsa amphitreptera
- Polinices
  - †Polinices mercedensis – type locality for species
  - †Polinices shumardianus – tentative report
- †Polycyclus
  - †Polycyclus henseli
- †Polyptychites
  - †Polyptychites trichotomus
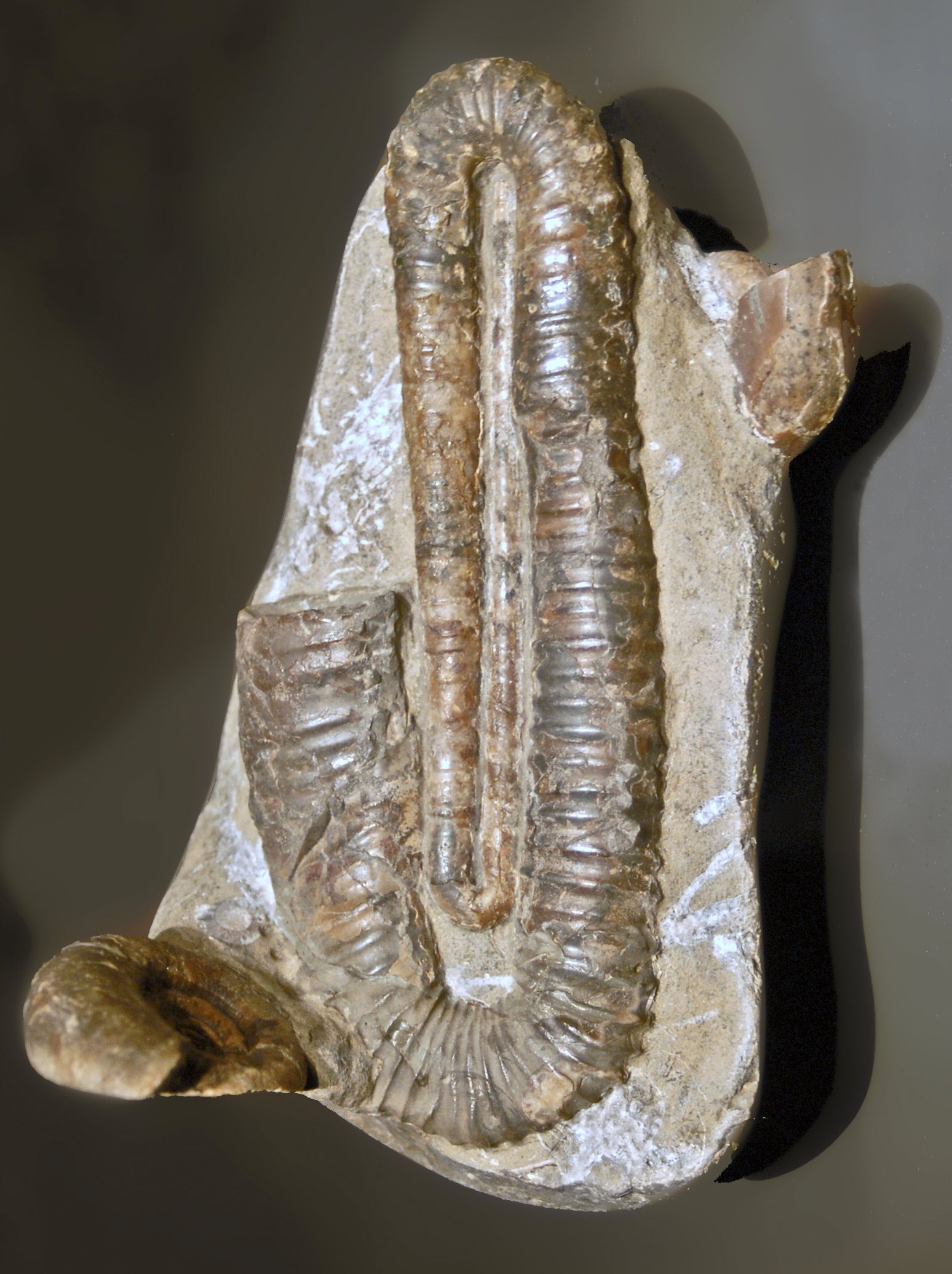
- Fossilized shell of the Late Cretaceous ammonoid cephalopod Polyptychoceras
  †Polyptychoceras
  - †Polyptychoceras obstrictum – or unidentified comparable form
- †Posidonia
  - †Posidonia alpina
  - †Posidonia jacksoni – type locality for species
  - †Posidonia madisonensis – type locality for species
- †Potamides – tentative report
  - †Potamides diadema
  - †Potamides grovesi – type locality for species
- †Praeconocaryomma
  - †Praeconocaryomma decora – or unidentified comparable form
  - †Praeconocaryomma fasciata – tentative report
  - †Praeconocaryomma immodica
  - †Praeconocaryomma magnimamma – or unidentified comparable form
  - †Praeconocaryomma media – or unidentified comparable form
  - †Praeconocaryomma parvimamma – or unidentified comparable form
  - †Praeconocaryomma prisca
  - †Praeconocaryomma uhlensis
  - †Praeconocaryomma whiteavesi – or unidentified comparable form
- †Praeconosphaera
  - †Praeconosphaera spinosa
- †Praeparvicingula
  - †Praeparvicingula decora
  - †Praeparvicingula discors – or unidentified related form
  - †Praeparvicingula gemmata
  - †Praeparvicingula holdsworthi
  - †Praeparvicingula hurdygurdyensis
  - †Praeparvicingula nebulosa
  - †Praeparvicingula packsaddlensis
  - †Praeparvicingula rotunda
  - †Praeparvicingula saltata
  - †Praeparvicingula sencilla
  - †Praeparvicingula siskiyouensis
  - †Praeparvicingula turpicula
- †Praewilliriedellum
  - †Praewilliriedellum cephalospinosum
- †Preflorianites
  - †Preflorianites strongi – type locality for species
  - †Preflorianites toulai
- †Prionocycloceras
  - †Prionocycloceras californicum
  - †Prionocycloceras crenulatum
- †Prionolobus
  - †Prionolobus waageni – type locality for species
- †Prionotropis
  - †Prionotropis casperi
  - †Prionotropis hiltensis – type locality for species
- †Priscoficus – tentative report
- †Prisconatica
  - †Prisconatica hesperia
- †Proarcestes
  - †Proarcestes carpenteri – type locality for species
  - †Proarcestes pacificus
  - †Proarcestes shastensis – type locality for species
  - †Proarcestes traski – type locality for species
  - †Proarcestes whitneyi
  - †Proarcestes winnemae – type locality for species
- †Proclydonautilus
  - †Proclydonautilus hessi – type locality for species
  - †Proclydonautilus spirolobus
  - †Proclydonautilus squawensis – type locality for species
  - †Proclydonautilus stantoni – type locality for species
  - †Proclydonautilus triadicus
  - †Proclydonautilus ursensis – type locality for species
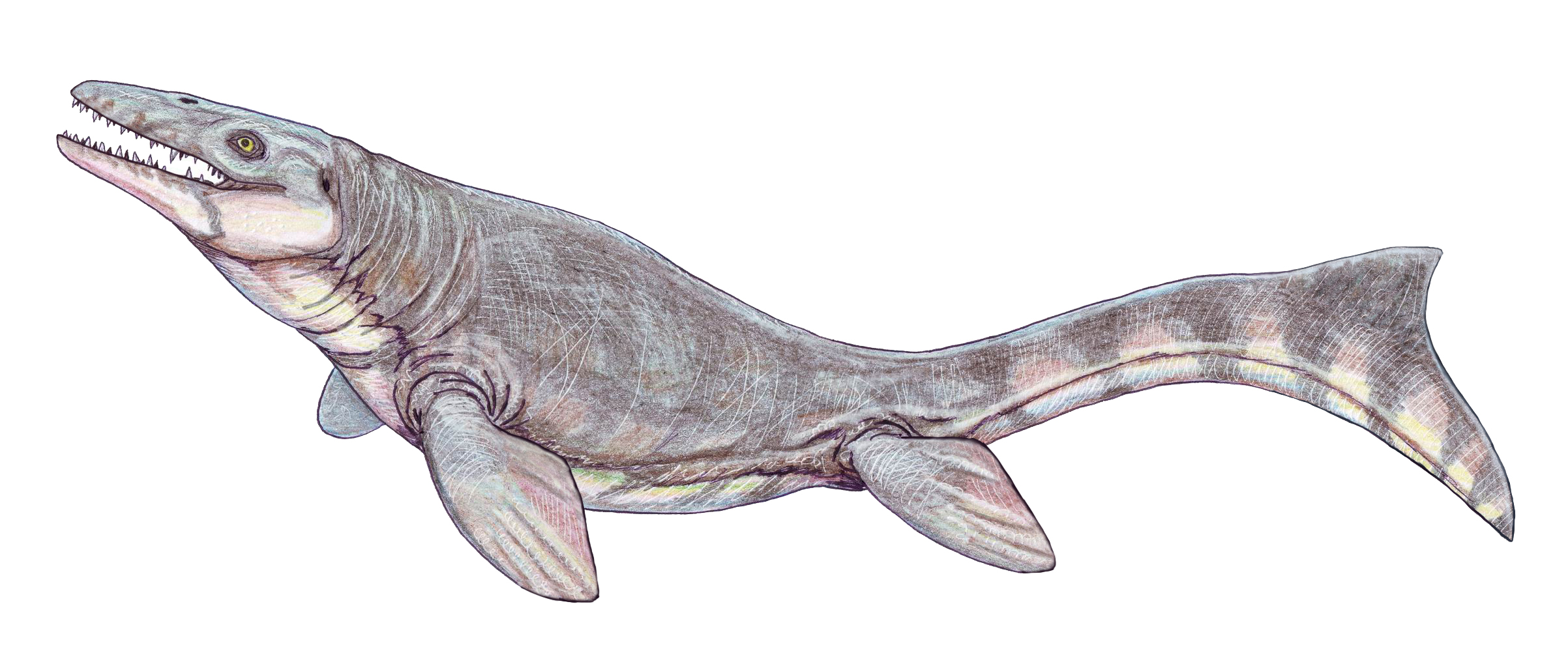
- Life restoration of the Late Cretaceous mosasaur Prognathodon
  †Prognathodon
  - †Prognathodon waiparaensis – or unidentified comparable form
- †Projuvavites
  - †Projuvavites brockensis – type locality for species
  - †Projuvavites strongi – type locality for species
- Propeamussium
- †Prosphingitoides
  - †Prosphingitoides austini – type locality for species
- †Protexanites
  - †Protexanites thompsoni
- †Protocardia
  - †Protocardia remondianum
  - †Protocardia translucidum
- †Protovallupus
  - †Protovallupus tetlamaensis
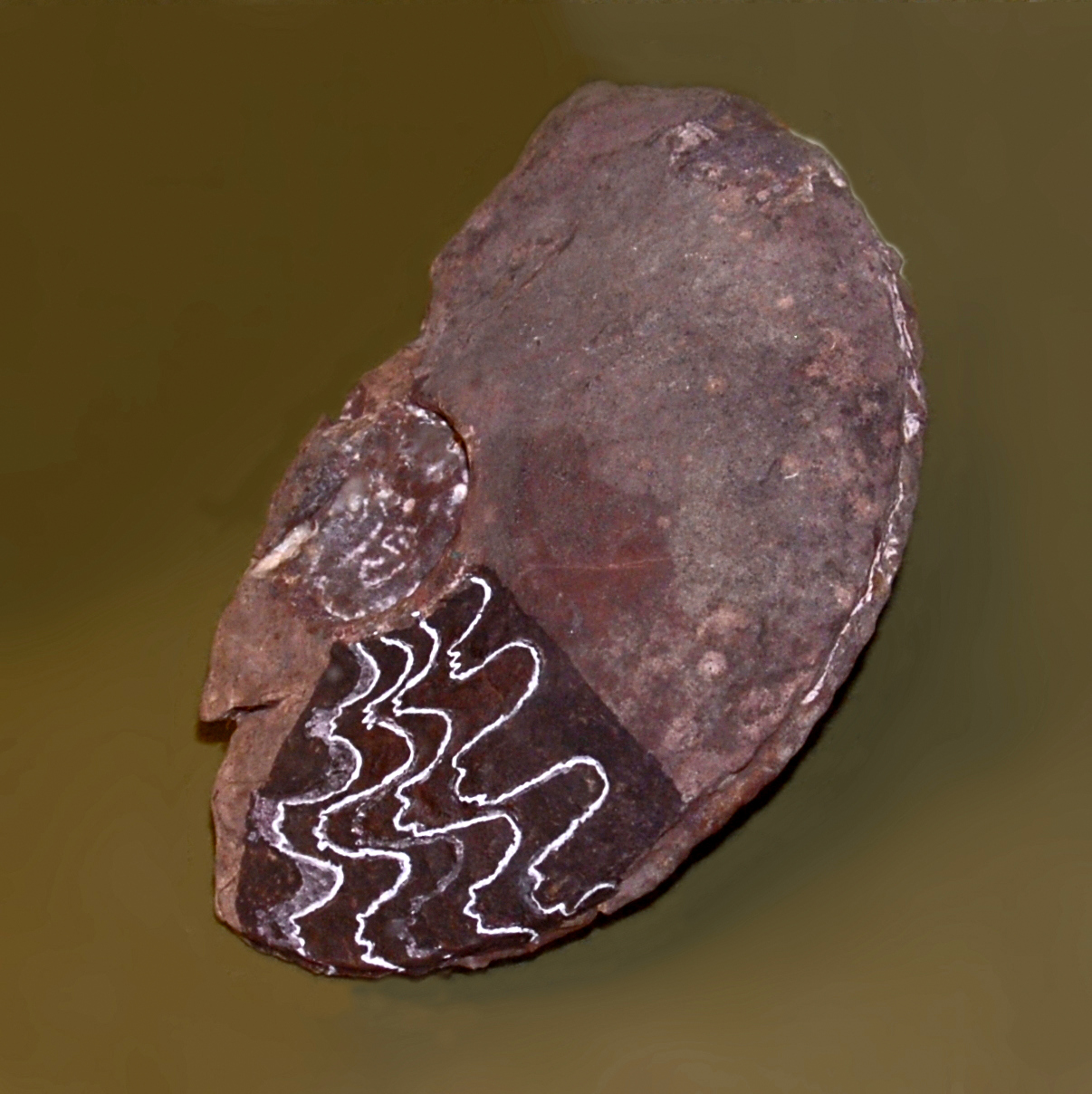
- Fossilized shell of the Triassic ammonoid cephalopod Protrachyceras
  †Protrachyceras
  - †Protrachyceras storrsi – type locality for species
- †Protunuma
  - †Protunuma japonicus
  - †Protunuma multicostatus – or unidentified related form
- †Pseudacrochordiceras
  - †Pseudacrochordiceras inyoense – type locality for species
- †Pseudanchura
  - †Pseudanchura biangulata
- †Pseudhelicoceras
  - †Pseudhelicoceras petersoni – type locality for species
- †Pseudocrucella
  - †Pseudocrucella ehrenbergi
- †Pseudocymia – type locality for genus
  - †Pseudocymia aitha – type locality for species
  - †Pseudocymia aurora – type locality for species
  - †Pseudocymia cahalli – type locality for species
- †Pseudodiadema
  - †Pseudodiadema emersoni
- †Pseudodictyomitra
  - †Pseudodictyomitra lodogaensis
  - †Pseudodictyomitra pentacolaensis
  - †Pseudodictyomitra pseudomacrocephala
  - †Pseudodictyomitra vestalensis
- †Pseudoeucyrtis
  - †Pseudoeucyrtis firmus
  - †Pseudoeucyrtis hannai – or unidentified comparable form
  - †Pseudoeucyrtis paskentaensis
- †Pseudogaleodea
- †Pseudoheliodiscus
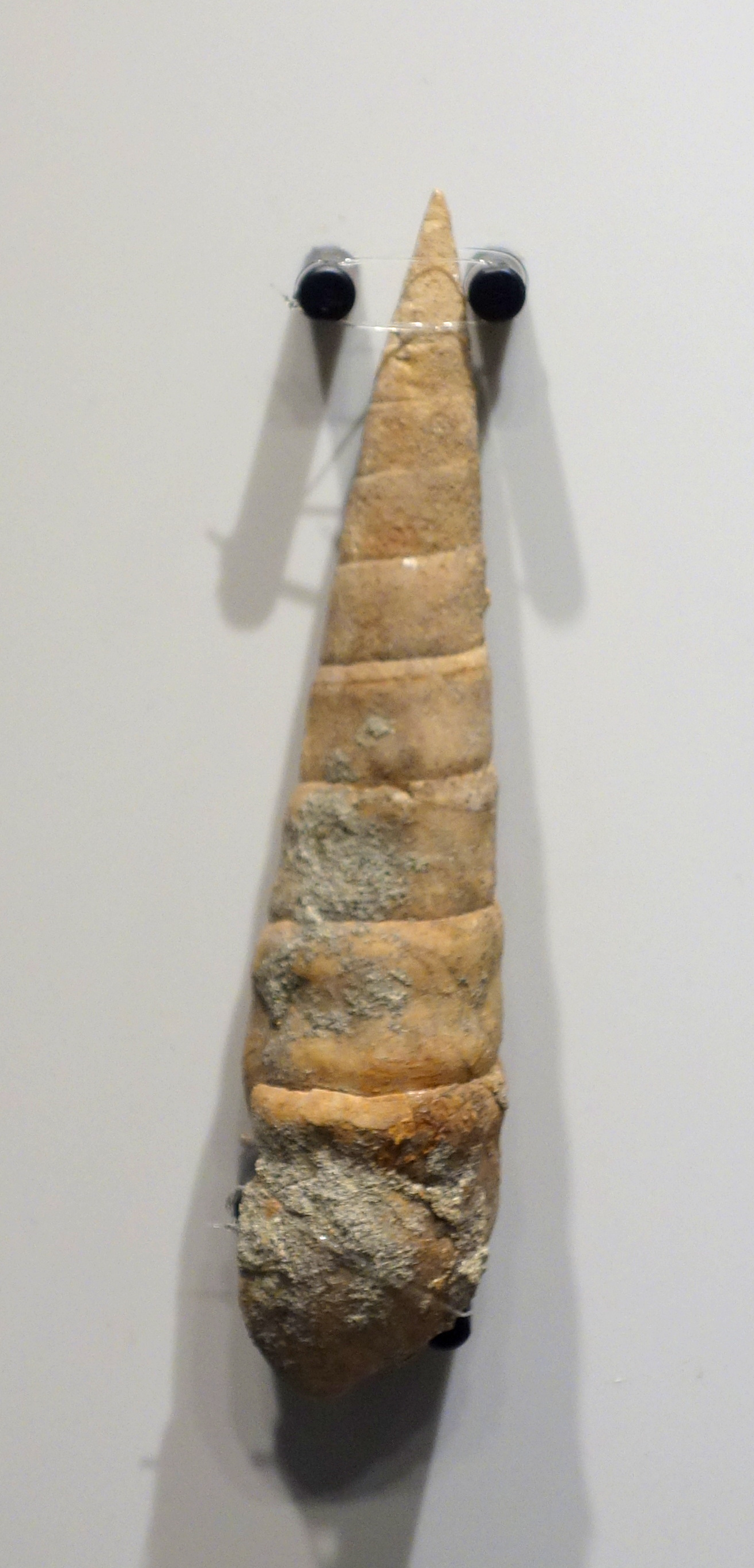
- Fossilized shell of a Pseudomelania sea snail
  †Pseudomelania
  - †Pseudomelania colusaensis – type locality for species
- †Pseudoperna
  - †Pseudoperna toxidonta
- †Pseudophyllites
- †Pseudoptera – tentative report
- †Pseudoristola
  - †Pseudoristola clava
  - †Pseudoristola nova
- †Pseudosageceras
  - †Pseudosageceras multilobatum
- †Pseudothurmannia – tentative report
  - †Pseudothurmannia jupiter
  - †Pseudothurmannia russelli
- †Pseudoxybeloceras
  - †Pseudoxybeloceras lineatum – or unidentified comparable form
- †Pteraichnus
- †Pteroluter
  - †Pteroluter othnius – type locality for species
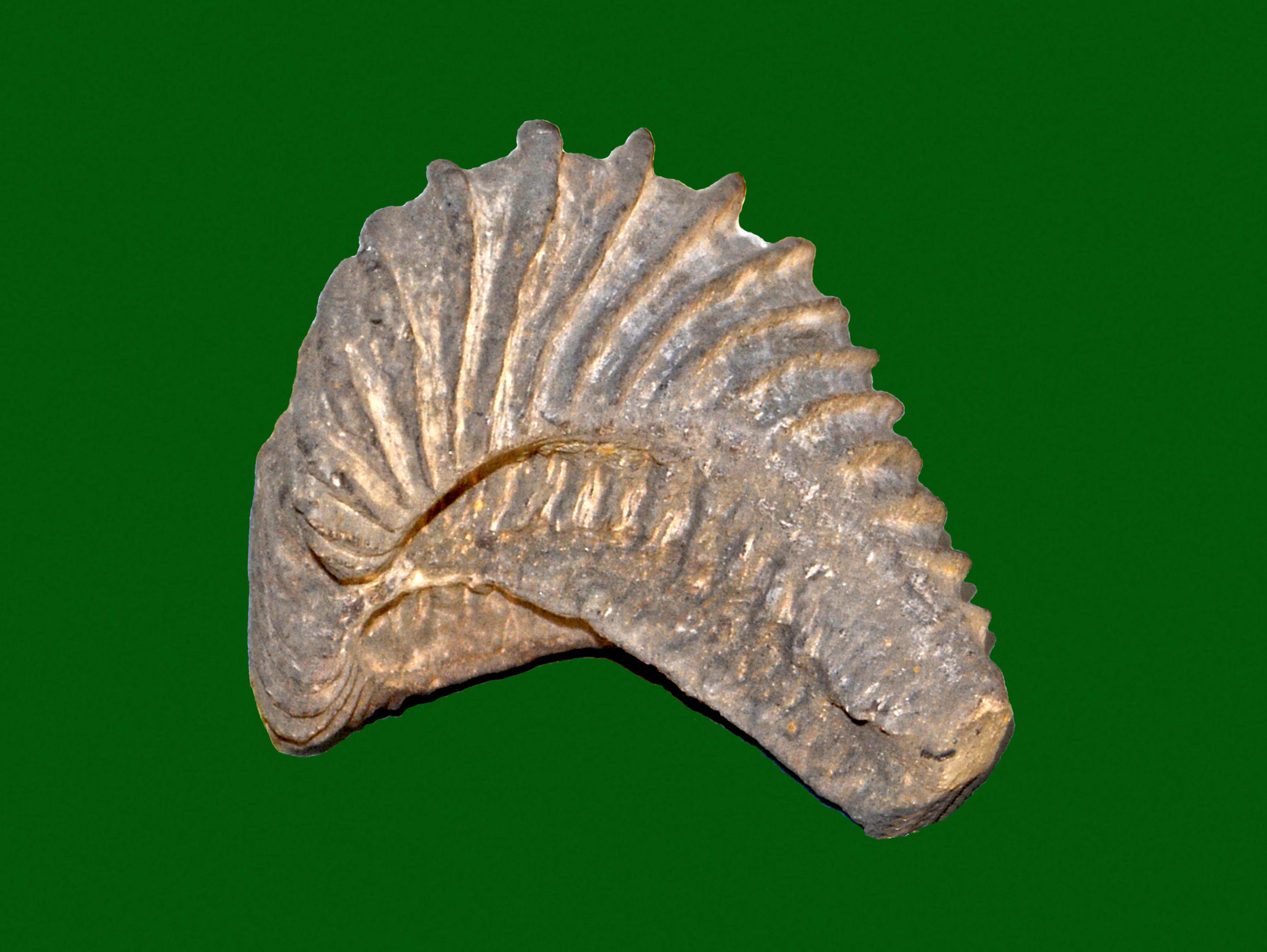
- Fossilized shell of the Jurassic-Cretaceous marine bivalve Pterotrigonia
  †Pterotrigonia
  - †Pterotrigonia evansana
  - †Pterotrigonia klamathonia
  - †Pterotrigonia oregana – or unidentified comparable form
- †Ptilorhynchia – type locality for genus
  - †Ptilorhynchia plumasensis – type locality for species
- †Ptiloteuthis – type locality for genus
  - †Ptiloteuthis foliatus – type locality for species
- †Ptychoceras – type locality for genus
  - †Ptychoceras laeve – type locality for species
- †Ptyctothyris
  - †Ptyctothyris hardgravensis – type locality for species
  - †Ptyctothyris phlegethontis – type locality for species
- †Pugnellus
  - †Pugnellus hammulus – or unidentified related form
  - †Pugnellus hamulus
  - †Pugnellus manubriatus
- †Puzosia
  - †Puzosia hannai – type locality for species
  - †Puzosia puma
  - †Puzosia sullivanae
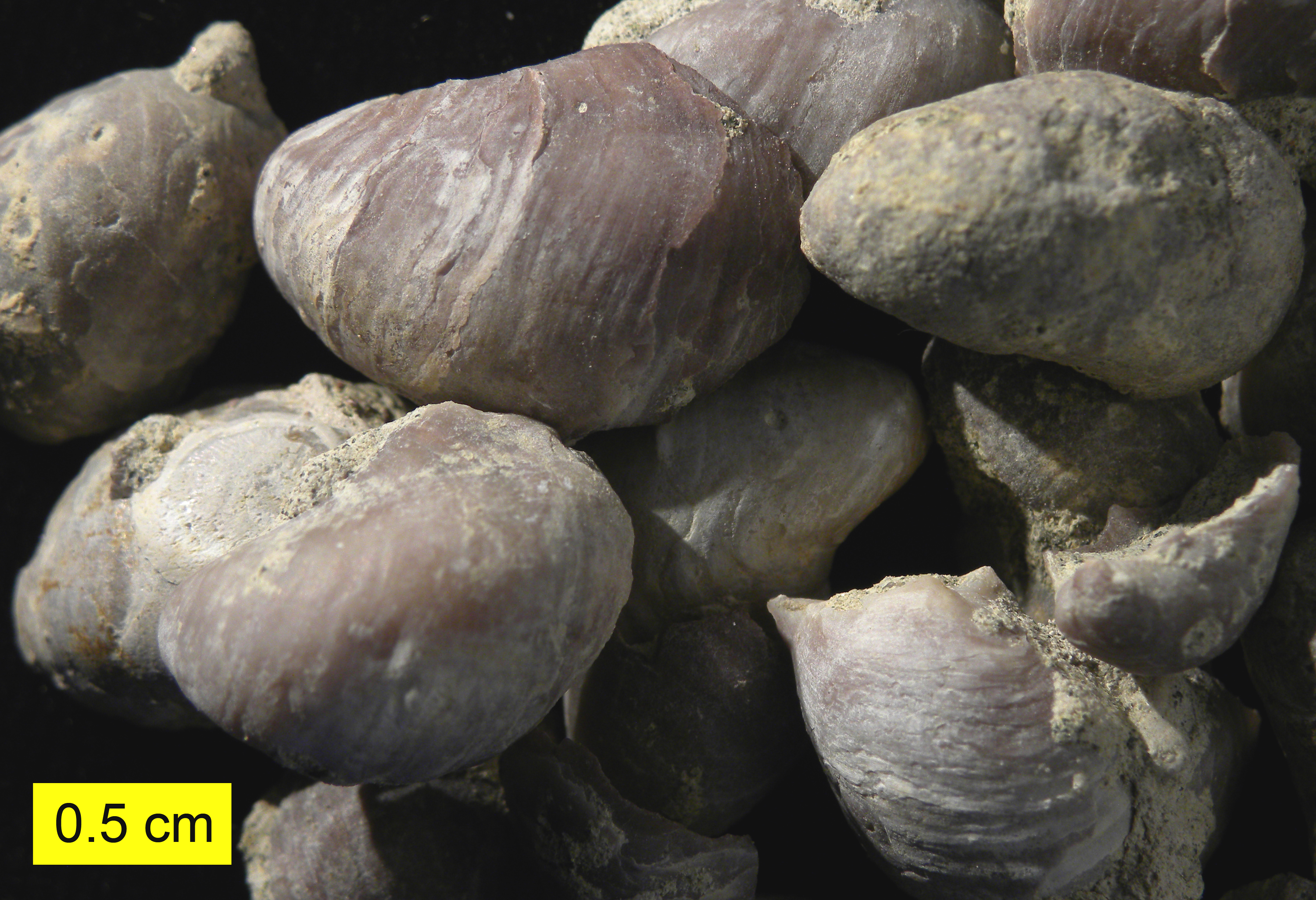
- Assemblage of fossilized shells of the Cretaceous-Pleistocene oyster Pycnodonte
  Pycnodonte
- †Pyktes
  - †Pyktes hamulus
- †Pyramispongia
  - †Pyramispongia glascockensis
- †Pyropsis

== Q ==
- Quadrans – tentative report
- †Quinquecapsularia
  - †Quinquecapsularia spinosa

== R ==
- †Radioceras
  - †Radioceras evolvens
- †Remondia
  - †Remondia oregonensis – type locality for species
- †Reptolunulites
- Retusa
- †Rhabdoceras
  - †Rhabdoceras suessi
- †Rhactorhynchia
  - †Rhactorhynchia trigona – type locality for species
- †Rhaetina – tentative report
  - †Rhaetina pyriformis
- †Rhectomax
  - †Rhectomax undulatus
- †Rhectomyax
  - †Rhectomyax undulatus
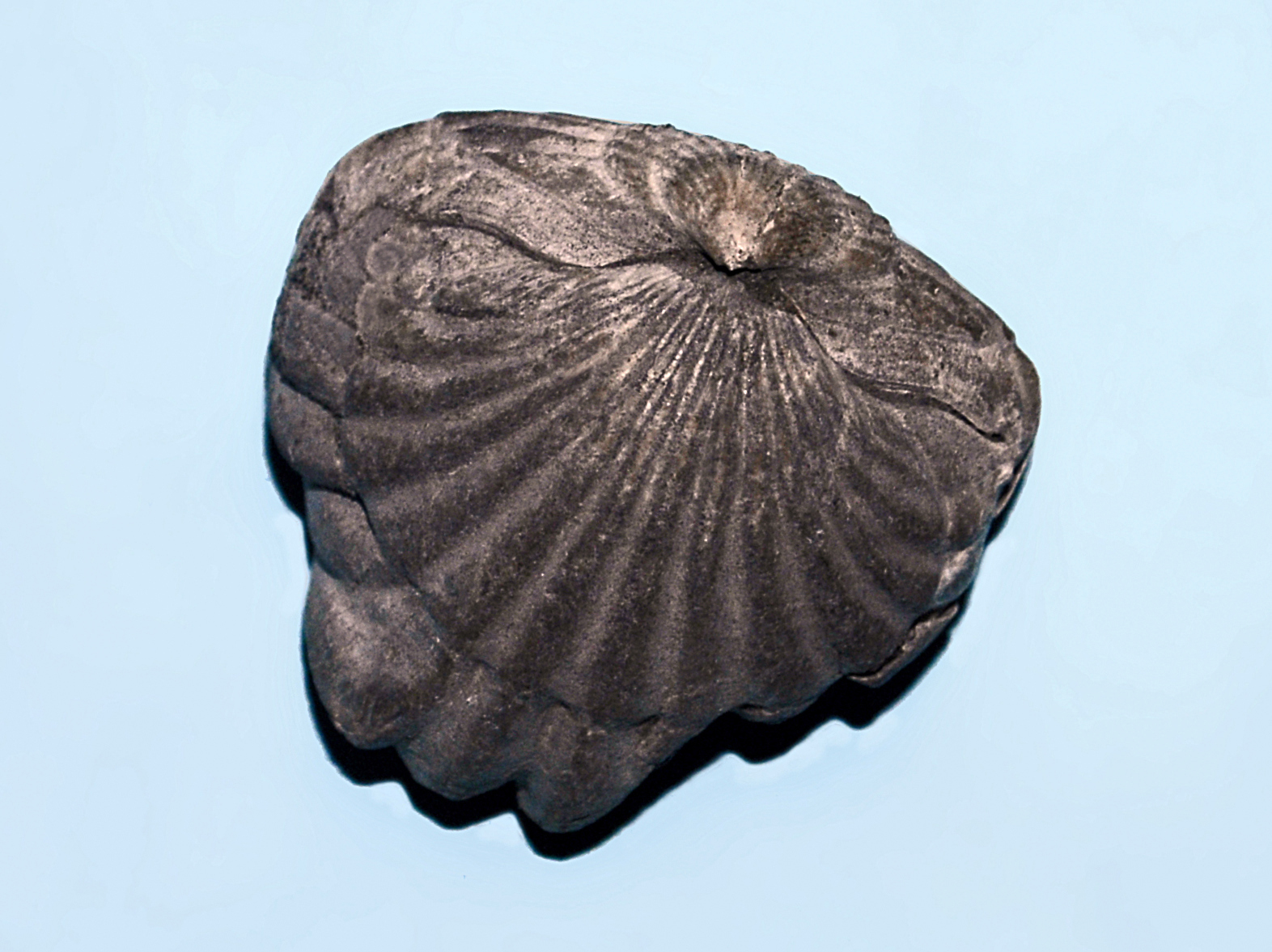
- Fossilized shell of the Silurian-Eocene articulate brachiopod Rhynchonella
  †Rhynchonella
  - †Rhynchonella richardsoni – type locality for species
  - †Rhynchonella varians – or unidentified comparable form
- †Riedelius
- †Ristola
  - †Ristola altissima
  - †Ristola bala
  - †Ristola procera
  - †Ristola turpicula
- Robulus
  - †Robulus inornatus
- Rogerella
- †Romaniceras
  - †Romaniceras deverioide

== S ==
- †Sagenites
  - †Sagenites dickersoni – type locality for species
- †Saghalinites
- †Sandlingites
  - †Sandlingites andersoni – type locality for species
  - †Sandlingites oribasus
- †Sarasinella
  - †Sarasinella angulata
- †Saturniforma
  - †Saturniforma peregrina
- †Scalarites
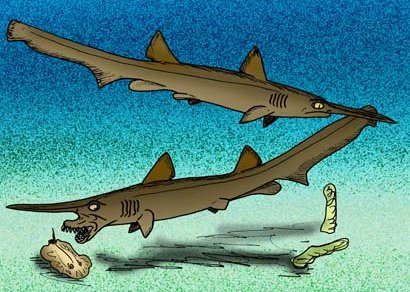
- Restoration of several of the Early Cretaceous-Miocene shark Scapanorhynchus
  †Scapanorhynchus
- Scaphander
  - †Scaphander costatus
- †Scaphites
  - †Scaphites hippocrepis – or unidentified related form
  - †Scaphites inermis – or unidentified related form
  - †Scaphites pittensis – type locality for species
- †Scaphotrigonia
  - †Scaphotrigonia naviformis
- †Sciponoceras
  - †Sciponoceras gracile – type locality for species
- Scobinella
  - †Scobinella dilleri
- †Semihsuum
  - †Semihsuum biscuithillense
  - †Semihsuum brokencotense
  - †Semihsuum inexploratum
  - †Semihsuum sourdoughense
- †Senis
- Septifer
- †Sequoia
  - †Sequoia reichenbachi
- Serpula
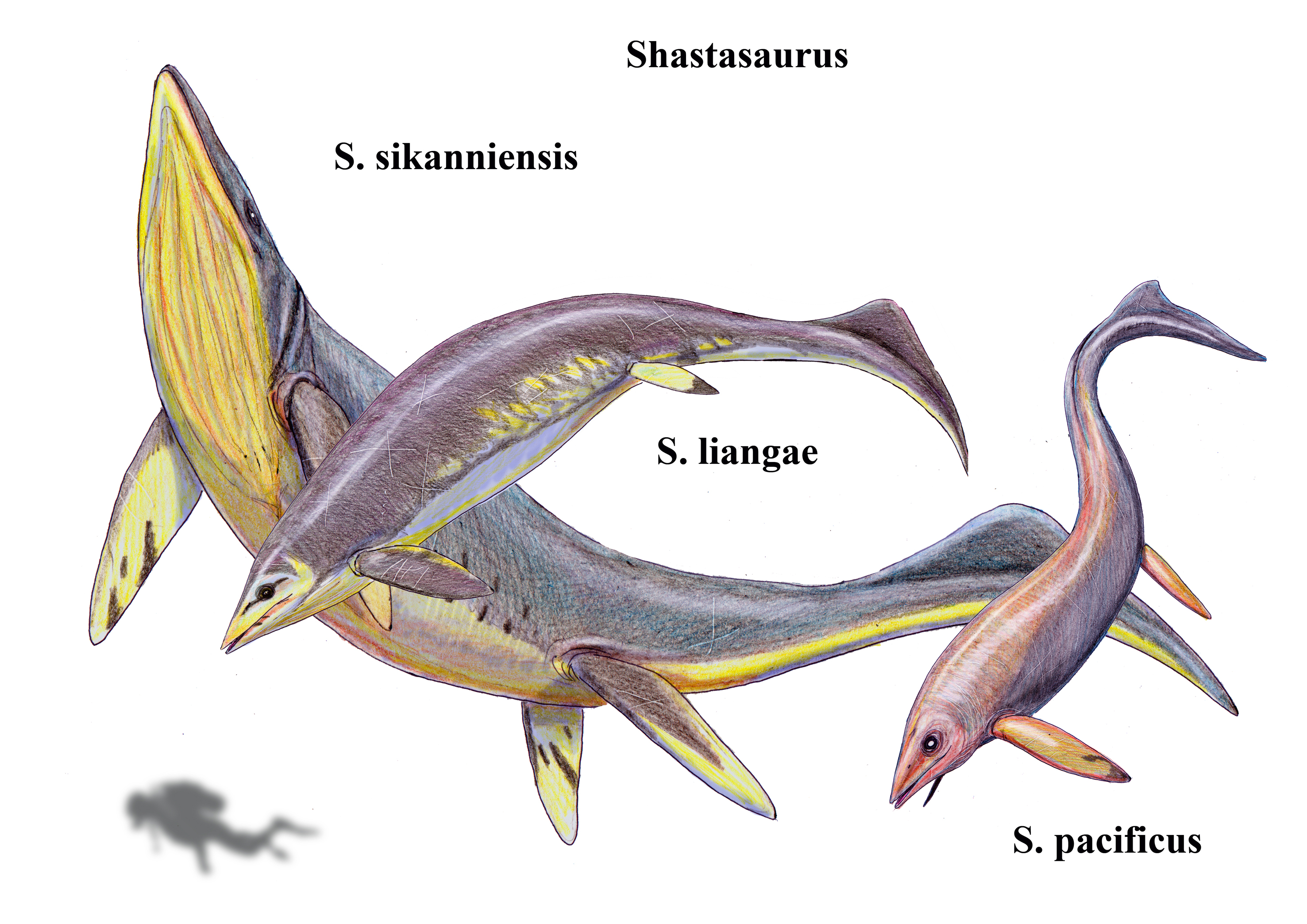
- Life restoration of three species of the Middle-Late Triassic ichthyosaur genus Shastasaurus
  †Shastasaurus
  - †Shastasaurus alexandrae
  - †Shastasaurus pacificus
- †Shasticrioceras
  - †Shasticrioceras whitneyi – or unidentified related form
- †Shastites
  - †Shastites compactus – type locality for species
  - †Shastites compressus – type locality for species
  - †Shastites whitneyi – type locality for species
- †Shastoceras
- †Silberlingia
  - †Silberlingia sanctaeanae
- †Simbirskites
  - †Simbirskites broadi
  - †Simbirskites lecontei
- Siphonalia
  - †Siphonalia dubius
- †Sirenites
  - †Sirenites lawsoni – type locality for species
- †Skolithos
- Solariella
  - †Solariella occidentalis
  - †Solariella stewarti
- Solemya – tentative report
- Solen
  - †Solen cuneatus – or unidentified comparable form
- †Solenoceras
- †Spiriferina – report made of unidentified related form or using admittedly obsolete nomenclature
  - †Spiriferina coreyi – type locality for species
- †Spirigera – report made of unidentified related form or using admittedly obsolete nomenclature
  - †Spirigera milesi – type locality for species
- †Spirogmoceras
  - †Spirogmoceras shastense – type locality for species
- †Spondylospira
  - †Spondylospira lewesensis
  - †Spondylospira parmata
- Spondylus
  - †Spondylus subnodosus
- †Spongiomorpha
  - †Spongiomorpha tenuis
- †Spongocapsula
  - †Spongocapsula dumitricai
  - †Spongocapsula hooveri
  - †Spongocapsula palmerae
  - †Spongocapsula zamoraensis
- †Spongosaturninus
  - †Spongosaturninus bispinus
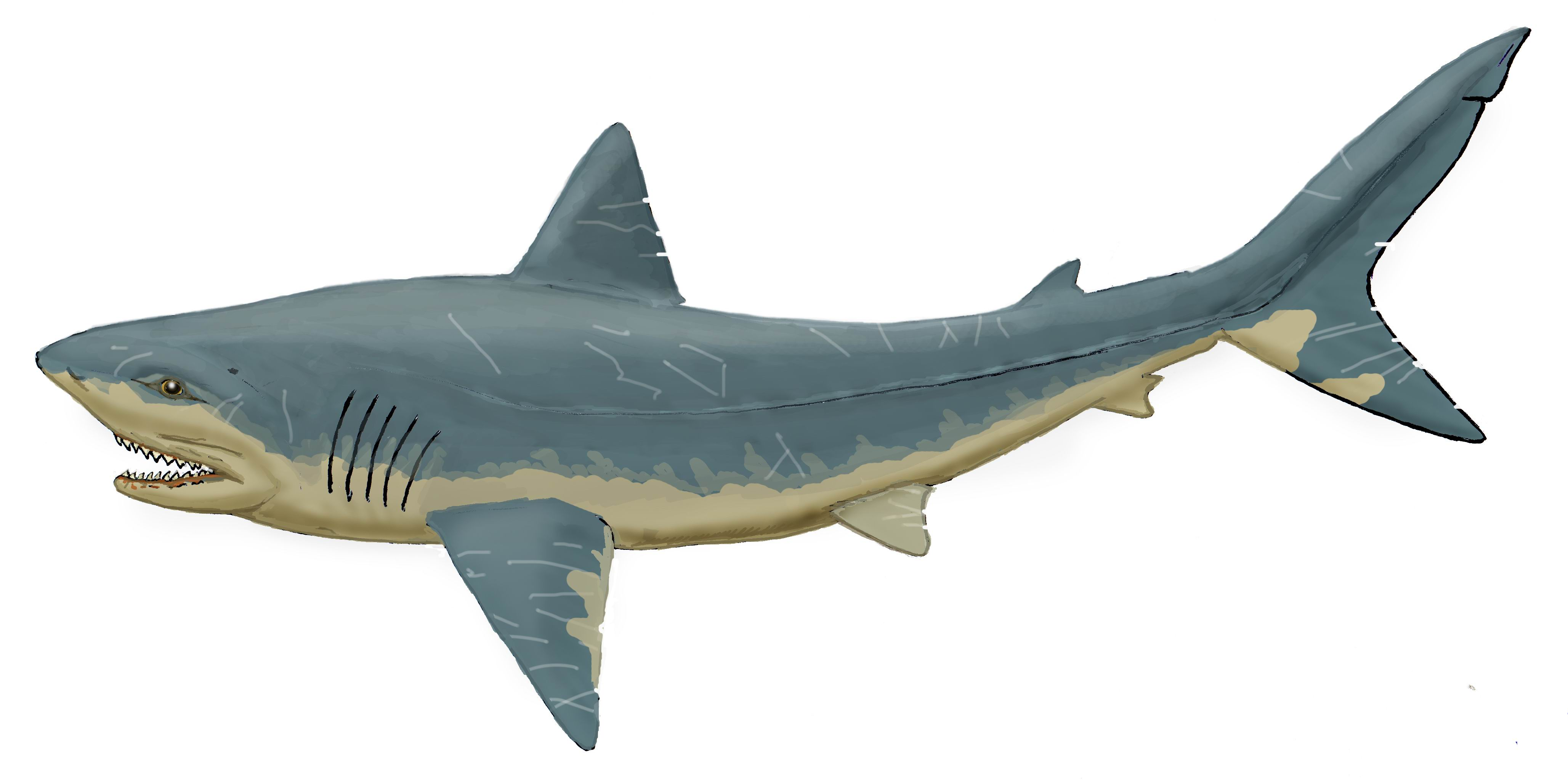
- Life restoration of the Late Cretaceous shark Squalicorax
  Squalicorax
- †Staurolonche
- Stichocapsa
  - †Stichocapsa convexa
  - †Stichocapsa japonica
- Stichomitra – tentative report
  - †Stichomitra takanoensis
- †Stoliczkaia
  - †Stoliczkaia praecursor – type locality for species
- †Stomechinus
  - †Stomechinus hyatti
- †Striatojaponocapsa
  - †Striatojaponocapsa conexa
  - †Striatojaponocapsa plicarum
- †Stromatomorpha
  - †Stromatomorpha californica – type locality for species
- †Sturia
  - †Sturia woodini
- †Subhungarites
  - †Subhungarites yatesi – type locality for species
- †Submeekoceras
  - †Submeekoceras mushbachanum
- †Submortoniceras
  - †Submortoniceras buttense
  - †Submortoniceras buttensis – type locality for species
  - †Submortoniceras chicoense
  - †Submortoniceras gabbi
  - †Submortoniceras pentzanum – type locality for species
  - †Submortoniceras randalli
  - †Submortoniceras studleyi
- †Subprinocyclus
- †Subprionocyclus
  - †Subprionocyclus branneri
  - †Subprionocyclus neptuni – or unidentified comparable form
  - †Subprionocyclus normalis – or unidentified comparable form
  - †Subprionocyclus oregonense
- † Suna
  - †Suna ehrenbergi
  - †Suna haeckeli
  - †Suna harperi
- †Sympolycyclus
  - †Sympolycyclus kellyi – type locality for species
  - †Sympolycyclus nodifer – type locality for species
- †Syncyclonema
  - †Syncyclonema latum – type locality for species
  - †Syncyclonema operculiformis

== T ==
- †Tappanella
  - †Tappanella novacubica
- †Tardeceras – type locality for genus
  - †Tardeceras parvum – type locality for species
- †Tegula
  - †Tegula jeanae
- †Tehamatea
  - †Tehamatea ovalis
- †Teichertus
  - †Teichertus cavernosus
  - †Teichertus notus
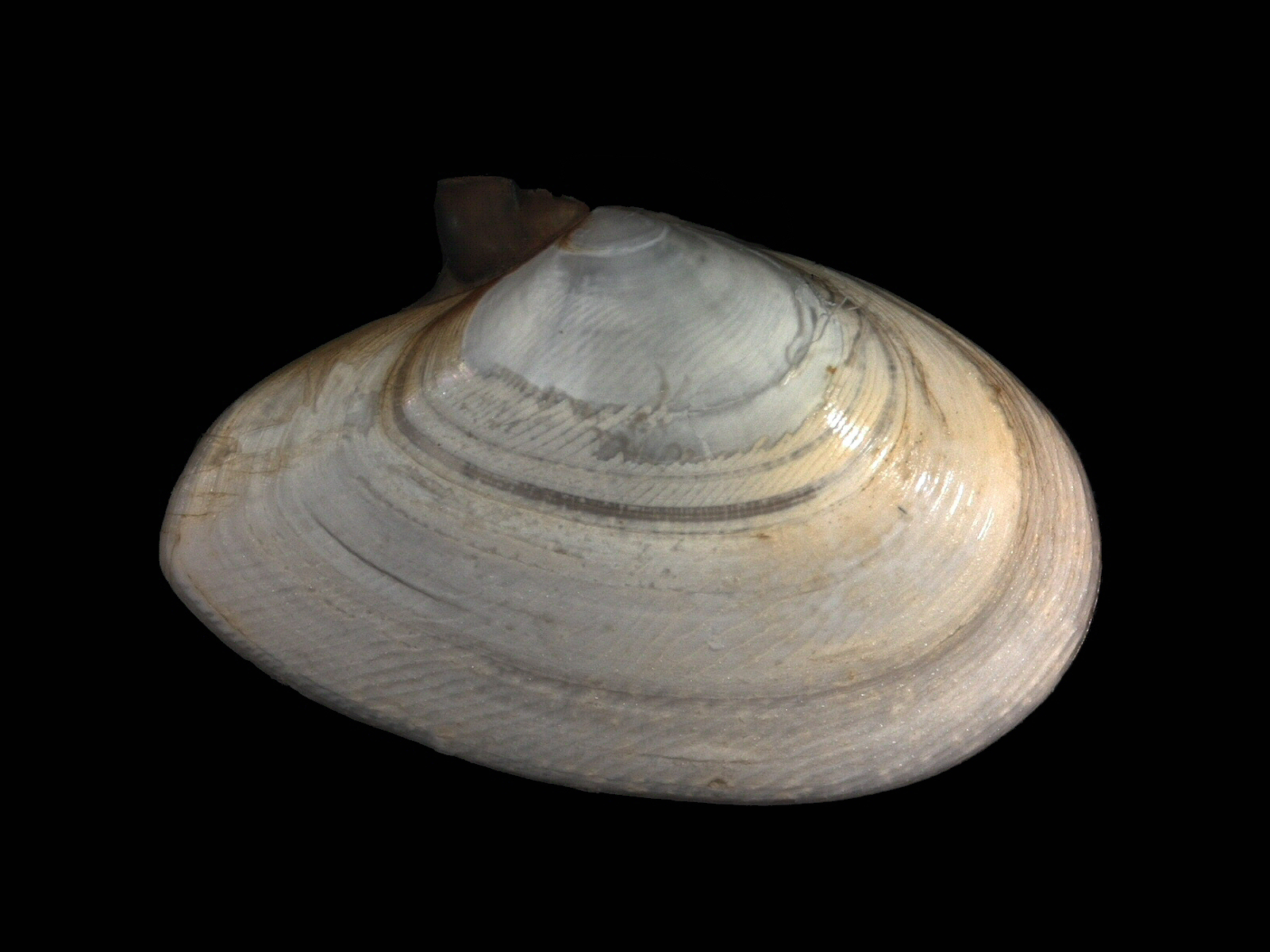
- Shell of a Tellina, or tellin
  Tellina
  - †Tellina – type locality for species A – informal
  - †Tellina alisoensis
  - †Tellina ashburnerii
  - †Tellina ooides
  - †Tellina paralis
  - †Tellina quadrata
  - †Tellina whitneyi
- †Tenea
  - †Tenea inflata
- †Teneposita – type locality for genus
  - †Teneposita laeva – type locality for species
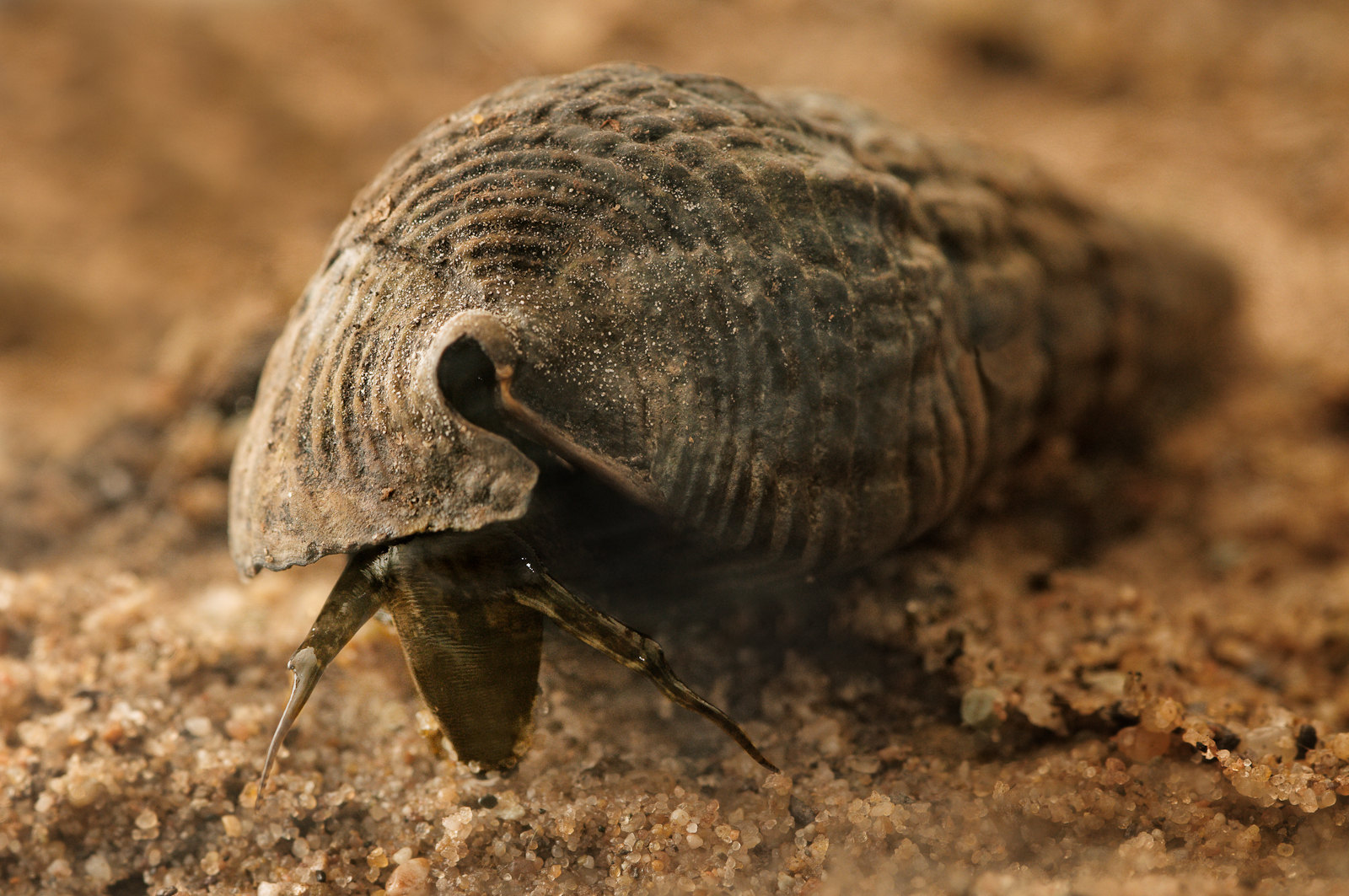
- A living Terebralia horn sea snail
  Terebralia – tentative report
  - †Terebralia juliana
- Terebratella
  - †Terebratella densleonis
- Terebratulina
  - †Terebratulina indomita – type locality for species
- †Tessarolax
  - †Tessarolax distorta
  - †Tessarolax trinalis
- †Tethysetta
  - †Tethysetta boesii
- †Tetracapsa
  - †Tetracapsa horokanaiensis
- †Tetraditryma
  - †Tetraditryma coldspringensis
  - †Tetraditryma corralitosensis
  - †Tetraditryma oregonensis
  - †Tetraditryma praeplena
  - †Tetraditryma pseudoplena
- †Tetragonites
  - †Tetragonites cala
  - †Tetragonites epigonum
  - †Tetragonites glabrus – or unidentified comparable form
  - †Tetragonites popetensis – type locality for species
- †Tetrahoplitoides
  - †Tetrahoplitoides stantoni
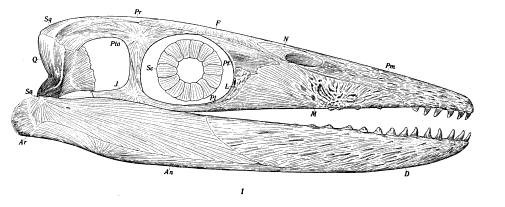
- Reconstructive illustration of the skull in side (above) and top view of the Late Triassic thalattosaur Thalattosaurus. The frontmost portion of the snout is portrayed erroneously as straight; it actually had a pronounced downward curve
  †Thalattosaurus
- †Thanarla
  - †Thanarla brouweri
  - †Thanarla elegantissima
  - †Thanarla praeveneta
  - †Thanarla veneta
- †Thetironia
  - †Thetironia annulata
- †Thisbites
  - †Thisbites uhligi
- †Thurmanniceras
  - †Thurmanniceras californicum
  - †Thurmanniceras jenkinsi
  - †Thurmanniceras stippi
- Thyasira
  - †Thyasira cretacea
- †Tibetothyris – report made of unidentified related form or using admittedly obsolete nomenclature
  - †Tibetothyris julica
- †Tibiaporrhais – tentative report
- †Tollia
  - †Tollia giganteus
- †Tornatellaea
  - †Tornatellaea impressa
- †Tornquistites – type locality for genus
  - †Tornquistites evolutus – type locality for species
- †Trachybaculites
  - †Trachybaculites columna
- †Trachysagenites
  - †Trachysagenites erinaceus
  - †Trachysagenites herbichi
  - †Trachysagenites shastensis – type locality for species
- †Trachystenoceras
  - †Trachystenoceras gabbi – type locality for species
- †Tragodesmoceras
  - †Tragodesmoceras ashlandicum
- †Trajanella
  - †Trajanella californica
- †Transhsuum
  - †Transhsuum brevicostatum
- †Traskites
  - †Traskites americanus – type locality for species
  - †Traskites californicus – type locality for species
  - †Traskites evolutus – type locality for species
  - †Traskites fairbanksi – type locality for species
  - †Traskites minutus – type locality for species
  - †Traskites nanus – type locality for species
  - †Traskites osmonti – type locality for species
  - †Traskites robustus – type locality for species
  - †Traskites rugosus – type locality for species
  - †Traskites stantoni – type locality for species
  - †Traskites tornquisti – type locality for species
- †Triactoma
  - †Triactoma blakei
  - †Triactoma jonesi
  - †Triactoma kellumi
  - †Triactoma longoriai
- †Trichinopolia
  - †Trichinopolia californica – type locality for species
- Tricolocapsa
- †Trigonarca
  - †Trigonarca californica – or unidentified related form
  - †Trigonarca californicus
  - †Trigonarca excavata
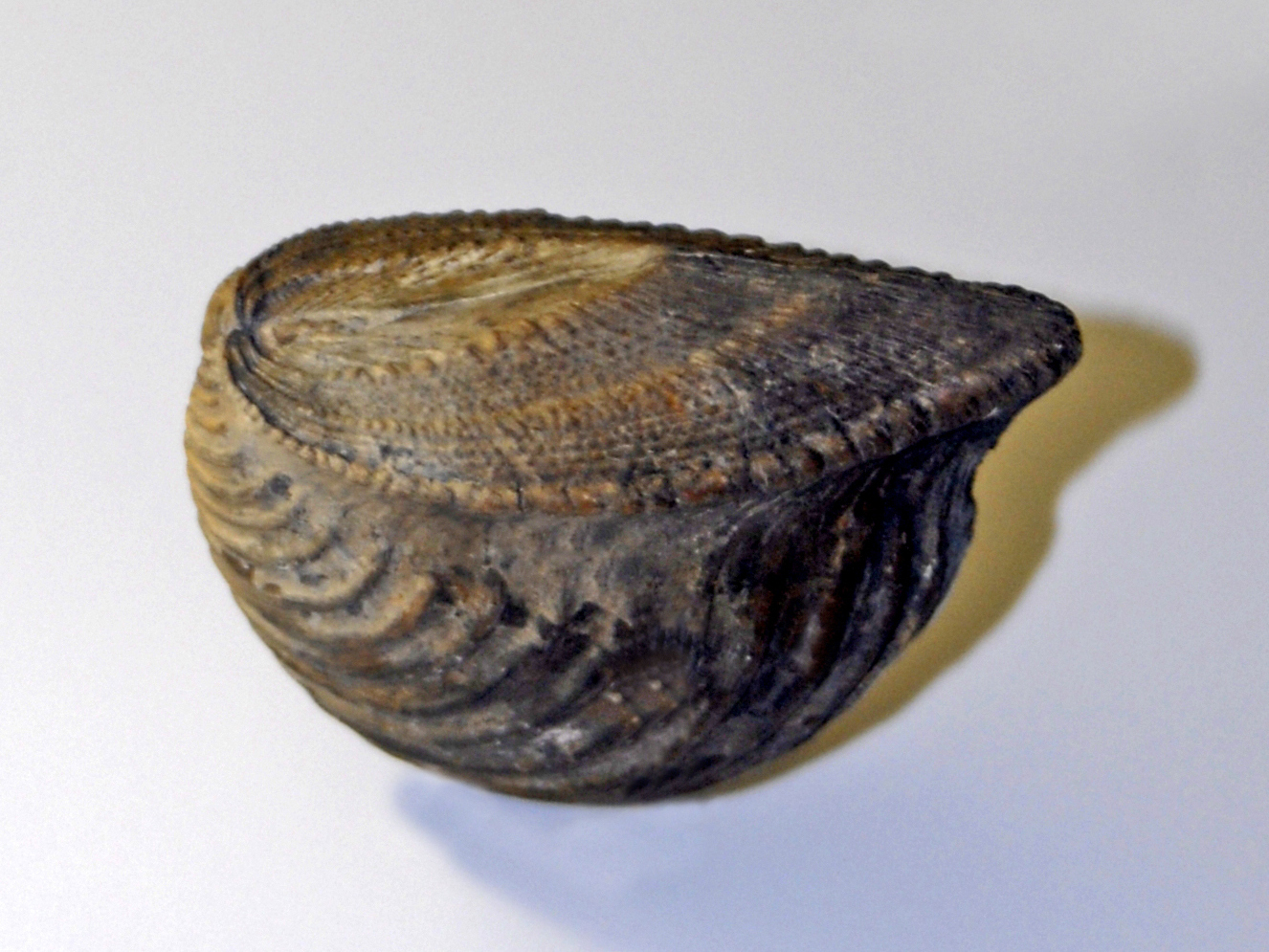
- Fossilized shell of the Permian-Paleocene marine bivalve Trigonia
  †Trigonia
  - †Trigonia aequicostata
  - †Trigonia denticulata – or unidentified comparable form
  - †Trigonia evansana
  - †Trigonia fitchi
  - †Trigonia hemisphaerica – or unidentified related form
  - †Trigonia hemphilli
  - †Trigonia inezana – or unidentified related form
  - †Trigonia jacksonensis – type locality for species
  - †Trigonia leana
  - †Trigonia perrinsmithi – type locality for species
  - †Trigonia plumasensis – type locality for species. Later reclassified in the new genus Californigonia as C. plumasensis.
  - †Trigonia spinulosa – or unidentified comparable form
  - †Trigonia tryoniana
  - †Trigonia undulata
  - †Trigonia vcostata – or unidentified comparable form
- †Trigonocallista
  - †Trigonocallista bowersiana
  - †Trigonocallista nitida
  - †Trigonocallista varians
- †Trillus
  - †Trillus elkhornensis
  - †Trillus seiderense – or unidentified comparable form
- †Trinacria
  - †Trinacria cor
- †Tripocyclia
  - †Tripocyclia brooksi
  - †Tripocyclia foremanae
  - †Tripocyclia frenchflatensis
  - †Tripocyclia highdomensis
  - †Tripocyclia mascula
  - †Tripocyclia saleebyi
- †Tritrabs
  - †Tritrabs casmaliaensis
  - †Tritrabs ewingi
  - †Tritrabs exotica
  - †Tritrabs hayi
  - †Tritrabs rhododactylus
  - †Tritrabs suavia
  - †Tritrabs worzeli
- †Triversus
  - †Triversus fastigatus
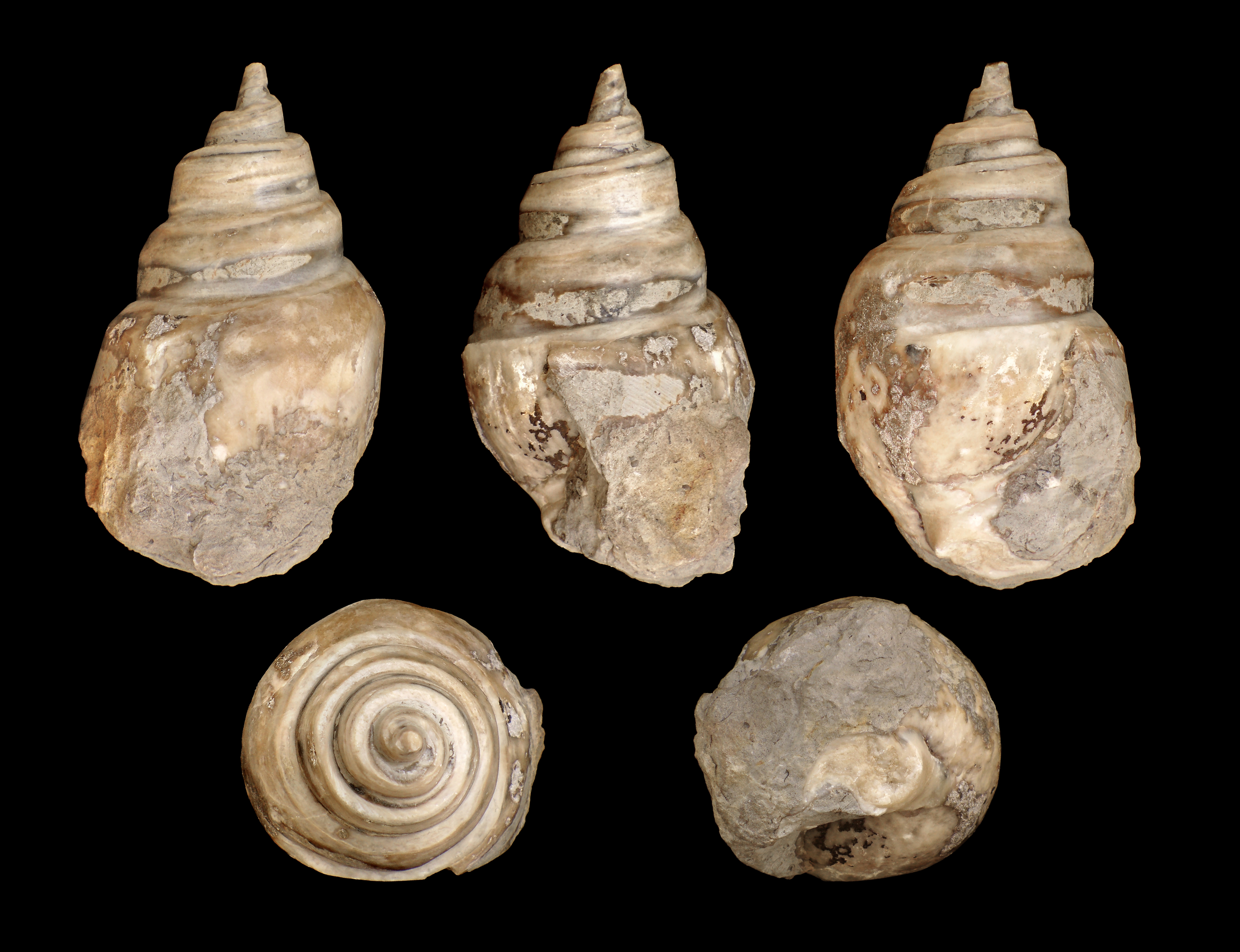
- Fossilized shell in multiple views of the Early-Late Cretaceous sea snail Trochactaeon
  †Trochactaeon
  - †Trochactaeon frazierensis
  - †Trochactaeon packardi
- Trochocyathus
  - †Trochocyathus pergranulatus – type locality for species
- Trophon
  - †Trophon condoni
- †Tropiceltites
  - †Tropiceltites caducus
- †Tropites
  - †Tropites arthaberi
  - †Tropites brockensis – type locality for species
  - †Tropites dieneri – type locality for species
  - †Tropites dilleri – type locality for species
  - †Tropites fusobullatus
  - †Tropites hessi – type locality for species
  - †Tropites keili
  - †Tropites kellyi – type locality for species
  - †Tropites mojsvarensis – type locality for species
  - †Tropites morani – type locality for species
  - †Tropites reticulatus
  - †Tropites rotatorius – type locality for species
  - †Tropites rothpletzi – type locality for species
  - †Tropites schellwieni – type locality for species
  - †Tropites shastensis – type locality for species
  - †Tropites stearnsi – type locality for species
  - †Tropites ursensis – type locality for species
  - †Tropites welleri – type locality for species
  - †Tropites wodani
- †Turanta
  - †Turanta chetcoensis
  - †Turanta flexa
  - †Turanta luminosa
  - †Turanta okamurai – or unidentified comparable form
- †Turrilites
  - †Turrilites acutus
  - †Turrilites costatus – or unidentified comparable form
  - †Turrilites petersoni – type locality for species
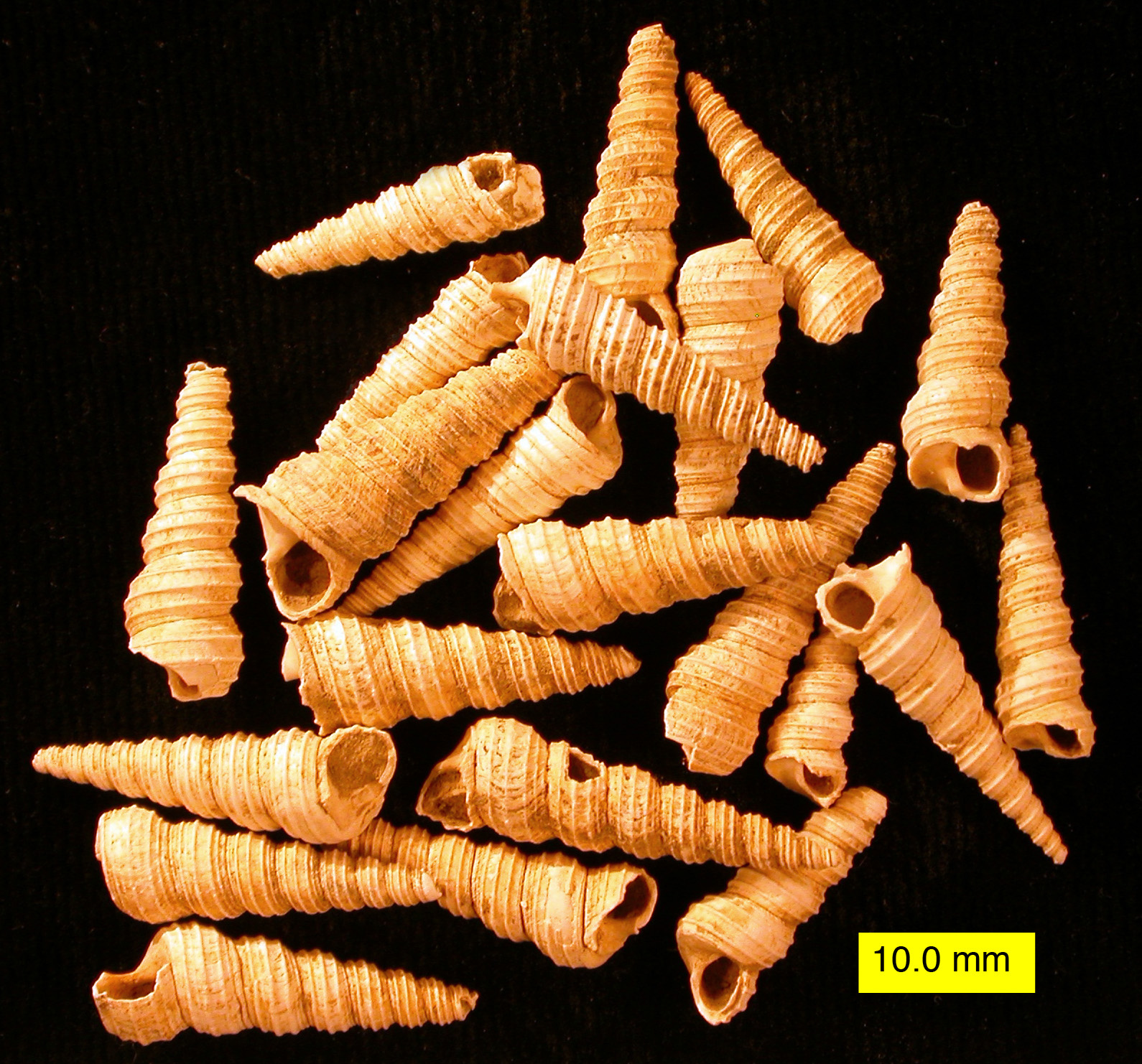
- Fossilized shells of the Late Jurassic-modern tower snail Turritella
  Turritella
  - †Turritella chaneyi
  - †Turritella chicoensis
  - †Turritella hearni
  - †Turritella infralineata
  - †Turritella peninsularis – or unidentified related form
  - †Turritella pescaderoensis
  - †Turritella peterseni – or unidentified related form
  - †Turritella petersoni
  - †Turritella robertiana – or unidentified comparable form
  - †Turritella webbi
  - †Turritella xylina
- †Tylostoma
  - †Tylostoma garzana – type locality for species

== U ==
- †Unuma
  - †Unuma echinatus
  - †Unuma gordus
  - †Unuma typicus

== V ==
- †Vallupus
  - †Vallupus hopsoni
- †Vaugonia
  - †Vaugonia kobayashii – or unidentified comparable form
  - †Vaugonia obliqua
  - †Vaugonia yukonensis – tentative report
- †Vitorfus
  - †Vitorfus campbelli
- Volsella
  - †Volsella siskiyouensis
- †Volutoderma
  - †Volutoderma averilli
  - †Volutoderma averillii
  - †Volutoderma californica
  - †Volutoderma dilleri
  - †Volutoderma gabbi
  - †Volutoderma jacksonensis
  - †Volutoderma magna
  - †Volutoderma santana

== W ==
- †Wilbertopora
  - †Wilbertopora sannerae – type locality for species
- †Willimactra
  - †Willimactra mathewsonii
  - †Willimactra popenoei
  - †Willimactra putida
  - †Willimactra truncata
- †Williriedellum
  - †Williriedellum carpathicum
  - †Williriedellum frequens
  - †Williriedellum madstonense
- †Wilvemia
  - †Wilvemia whiskeyensis
- †Worthenia
  - †Worthenia klamathensis – type locality for species
- †Wrangellium
- †Wyomingites
  - †Wyomingites aplanatus

== X ==
- †Xiphostylus
  - †Xiphostylus gasquetensis
  - †Xiphostylus humboldtensis
- †Xitus
  - †Xitus antelopensis
  - †Xitus antiquus
  - †Xitus plenus
  - †Xitus pulcher
  - †Xitus singularis
  - †Xitus spicularius
  - †Xitus spineus

== Y ==
- †Yaadia
  - †Yaadia branii – or unidentified comparable form
  - †Yaadia hemphilli
  - †Yaadia robusta
  - †Yaadia tryoniana
- †Yezoites
  - †Yezoites puerculus – or unidentified comparable form
- Yoldia
  - †Yoldia diminutiva
  - †Yoldia leana
  - †Yoldia nasuta

== Z ==
- †Zanola
  - †Zanola cornuta – or unidentified comparable form
- †Zartus
- †Zealandites
- †Zhamoidellum
  - †Zhamoidellum exquisita
  - †Zhamoidellum kiesslingi
  - †Zhamoidellum kozuri
  - †Zhamoidellum parva
  - †Zhamoidellum triangulosa
- †Zifondium
  - †Zifondium lassenensis
  - †Zifondium paupera
- †Zimmerella – type locality for genus
  - †Zimmerella eastoni
- †Zinsitys – tentative report
- †Zugmayerella
  - †Zugmayerella americana
- †Zugmeyeria
