= Ammonitoceras =

Ammonitoceras Temporal range: Aptian

Scientific classification
- Kingdom: Animalia
- Phylum: Mollusca
- Class: Cephalopoda
- Subclass: †Ammonoidea
- Order: †Ammonitida
- Suborder: †Ancyloceratina
- Family: †Ancyloceratidae
- Genus: †Ammonitoceras; Dumas, 1876

Type species
- Ammonitoceras ucetiae Dumas, 1876

Other species
- †A. ackermanni Krenkel, 1910; †A. ramboulai Collignon, 1962; †A. chalense Lehmann and Bayliss, 2026; †A. ochtrupense Lehmann and Bayliss, 2026

Genus of molluscs (fossil)

Ammonitoceras is an extinct genus of heteromorphic ammonite cephalopod that lived during the latter part of the Early Cretaceous in what is now Europe and the Transcaspian region. Ammonitoceras was named by Dumas, 1876, the type-species: Ammonitoceras ucetiae. Although the description doesn't mention the earliest whorls ending in a hook, like in the shells of Ancyloceras or Acrioceras, Ammonitoceras is included in the family Ancyloceratidae. However neither do Australiceras or Tropaeum have hooks, which are also included in the family.
