= Crioceratidae =

Crioceratidae Temporal range: Hauterivian–Aptian

Scientific classification
- Kingdom: Animalia
- Phylum: Mollusca
- Class: Cephalopoda
- Subclass: †Ammonoidea
- Order: †Ammonitida
- Suborder: †Ancyloceratina
- Superfamily: †Ancyloceratoidea
- Family: †Crioceratidae; Wright 1952

The Crioceratidae constitute a family of loosely to closely coiled Ammonitida included in the Ancyloceratoidea that lived during the Early Cretaceous; characterized by Crioceratites and other genera such as Hoplocrioceras and Paracrioceras.

The Crioceratidae are gyroconic, coiled in a plane, generally with space between the whorls although in some like Balearites the whorls are barely in contact.

Although distinct in character and not truly heteromorphic the Crioceratidae were included in the American TreatisePart L, 1957, in the Ancyloceratidae as the subfamily Crioceratinae. It is now considered a distinct family as originally proposed by Wright 1952 with the Acrioceratidae, proposed by Vermeulen (2004), a transition between the two.

Other genera in the Crioceratidae include Aegocrioceras, Menutheocrioceras, and Shasticrioceras.
