= Lytocrioceras =

Lytocrioceras Temporal range: Barremian

Scientific classification
- Kingdom: Animalia
- Phylum: Mollusca
- Class: Cephalopoda
- Subclass: †Ammonoidea
- Order: †Ammonitida
- Suborder: †Ancyloceratina
- Family: †Ancyloceratidae
- Genus: †Lytocrioceras; Spath, 1924

Genus of molluscs (fossil)

Lytocrioceras is a genus of ancyloceratine ammonites from the Lower Cretaceous with a shell that resembles a safety pin. The shell begins as a loosely wound spiral, followed by a straight shaft which makes a U-turn to go back is somewhat the opposite direction, ending in a jog, offset from the original coil.

Lytocrioceras was originally included in the Ancyloceratidae (Lytoceratina), united with other similar forms but has since been reassigned to the Macroscaphitidae.
