= Aspinoceras =

Aspinoceras Temporal range: Early Cretaceous

Scientific classification
- Domain: Eukaryota
- Kingdom: Animalia
- Phylum: Mollusca
- Class: Cephalopoda
- Subclass: †Ammonoidea
- Order: †Ammonitida
- Suborder: †Ancyloceratina
- Family: †Ancyloceratidae
- Genus: †Aspinoceras; Anderson, 1938

Genus of molluscs (fossil)

Aspinoceras is an extinct genus of heteromorph ammonites that lived during the Early Cretaceous. The shell small; starts off with a few loosely wound whorls not in contact followed by a short moderately curved shaft ending in a broad hook. Surface covered with mostly fine, close spaced ribs, with periodic larger ribs. In general form it resembles Ancyloceras.

Aspinoceras has been found in upper Hauterivian - lower Barremian formations in Europe and California.
