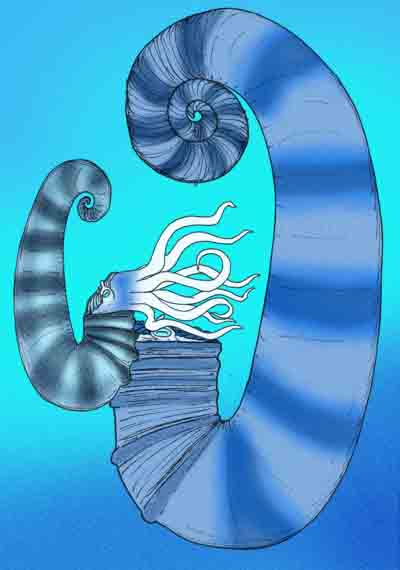
- Shastoceras behemoth & S. californicum

Scientific classification
- Kingdom: Animalia
- Phylum: Mollusca
- Class: Cephalopoda
- Subclass: †Ammonoidea
- Order: †Ammonitida
- Suborder: †Ancyloceratina
- Family: †Ancyloceratidae
- Genus: †Shastoceras; Anderson, 1938

Species
- S. californicum type; S. behemoth

= Shastoceras =

Shastoceras Temporal range: Early Aptian Aptian

Genus of molluscs (fossil)

Shastoceras is a genus of extinct ammonites found in Lower Aptian sediments in Northern California. Although sometimes placed in the Heteroceratidae, a family characterized by a helically wound early portion, its form indicates it more likely belongs to the Ancyloceratidae.

Shastoceras resembles Uhligia from the Lower Barremian of Germany, except for being stouter. In both genera the initial portion is short and in general straight, followed by a more or less 180 deg. bend and a straight to moderately curved shaft ending in a hook. The shaft of Shastoceras is shorter and broader than that of Uhligia.
