= Antarcticoceras =

Antarcticoceras Temporal range: Cretaceous: Barremian to Lower Albian(?)129.4–113 Ma

Scientific classification
- Kingdom: Animalia
- Phylum: Mollusca
- Class: Cephalopoda
- Subclass: †Ammonoidea
- Order: †Ammonitida
- Suborder: †Ancyloceratina
- Family: †Ancyloceratidae
- Genus: †Antarcticoceras; Thomson, 1974

Species
- A. antarcticum(Type) (Thompson, 1974); A. domeykanum (Bayle and Coquand, 1851); 'A. perezi' (Nomen nudum) (Mourgues, 2007)

Extinct genus of ammonites

Antarcticoceras is a genus of crioconic ammonites in the family Shasticrioceratidae. It lived during the Early Cretaceous Period. Antarcticioceras fossils can be found in the Cretaceous rocks of Antarctica and South America.

== Taxonomy and evolution ==
The type species of Antarcticoceras, A. antarcticum, was described from 6 (possibly 7) specimens that were recovered from Alexander Island: the largest antarctic island. When these specimens were first recovered, it was thought they represented an unknown taxon within the Ancyloderid subfamily Helicancyanae. This original hypothesis was made because the first two specimens recovered were smaller in overall size and displayed apparent aspinoceratid coiling, which is typical within several helicancyan taxa. Once more specimens were recovered, it became clear that the overall form of the shell was more similar to the Crioceratidae than the Ancyloceratidae. The exact placement of Antarcticoceras remained uncertain because the specimens displayed high dorso-lateral tubercule, single-sized ribbing, and fairly simple suture, none of which were Crioceratid features.

A later study found major similarities in the ventral morphology and ornamentation Shasticrioceras and Antarcticoceras which suggest a shared evolutionary origin. A new family, Shasticrioceratidae, was then erected to accommodate both genera.

Following the placement of the genus into the Shasticrioceratidae, it appears most likely that Antarcticoceras evolved sometime during or before the Barremian from Shasticrioceras or a Shasticrioceras-like common ancestor. A. domeykanum appeared first, followed by A. perezi and A. antarcticum, however the nomen nudum status of A. perezi casts uncertainty on the late-Berremian to early Albian evolutionary history of the genus, until the appearance of A. antarcticum.

=== Species ===
Three species of Antarcticoceras are known in the literature: A. antarcticum, the type, was recovered from Albian- aged rocks of Alexander Island. Following the recognition of Antarcticoceras as a genus another species, A. domeykanum (from the earlier Barremian) was placed into the genus as well. A third species A. perezi is generally regarded as a nomen nudum (the description is not considered complete enough to justify a valid taxonomic name).

== Distribution and habitat ==
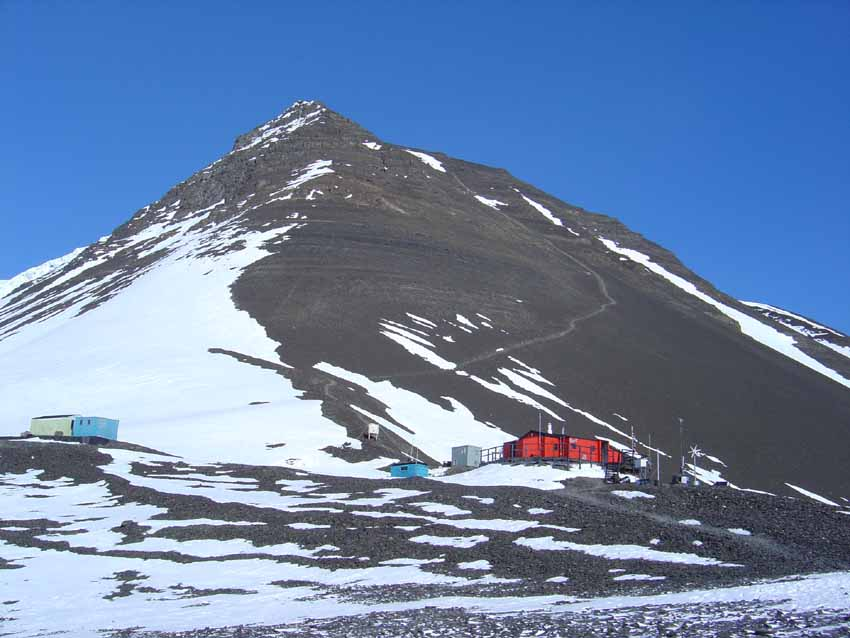
Alexander Island's Fossil Bluff, where most of its Cretaceous fossils were recovered.

Anarcticoceras fossils are known from marine deposits randing from 113 to 129 million years in age. A. domeykanum is found in the Chañarcillo Basin of northern Chile, While A. antarcticum is known only from the rocks of Antarctica's Alexander Island.
