= Uhligia (ammonite) =

Uhligia Temporal range: L Cretaceous

Scientific classification
- Kingdom: Animalia
- Phylum: Mollusca
- Class: Cephalopoda
- Subclass: †Ammonoidea
- Order: †Ammonitida
- Suborder: †Ancyloceratina
- Family: †Ancyloceratidae
- Genus: †Uhligia; Koenen, 1904

Genus of molluscs (fossil)

Uhligia is a genus of Lower Cretaceous (Barremian) ancylocerid ammonoid cephalopods initially found in Germany.

Uhligia, named by Koenen, 1904, has the general form characteristic of heteromorph ancyloceratids. The early part is more or less straight, then sharply bent, followed by a second straight shaft and a final hook. Ribs are fine, weak, and irregular, lacking tubercles; slanted in the early part, straight in the later. Uhligia differs from genera like Ancyloceras and Aspinoceras in lacking the open coil in the early stage.
