= Menuthiocrioceras =

Menuthiocrioceras Temporal range: Valanginian–Barremian

Scientific classification
- Domain: Eukaryota
- Kingdom: Animalia
- Phylum: Mollusca
- Class: Cephalopoda
- Subclass: †Ammonoidea
- Order: †Ammonitida
- Suborder: †Ancyloceratina
- Family: †Crioceratitidae
- Genus: †Menuthiocrioceras; Collignon, 1949

Type species
- Crioceras (Menuthiocrioceras) Lenoblei Collignon, 1949

Extinct genus of ammonites

Menuthiocrioceras is an ammonite genus from the Early Cretaceous belonging to the Ancyloceratoidea. Fossils belonging to this genus were found in Madagascar and Indonesia.

== Species ==
Species within the genus Menuthiocrioceras include:

- M. ampakabense Collignon, 1962
- M. aontzyense Collignon, 1962
- M. besairiei Collignon, 1949
- M. colcanapi Collignon, 1962
- M. compressum Skwarko & Thieuloy, 1989
- M. hourcqui Collignon, 1949
- M. irianense Skwarko & Thieuloy, 1989
- M. kuntzi Collignon, 1962
- M. lenoblei Collignon, 1949
- M. mahafalense Collignon, 1962
- M. sarkari Collignon, 1962
- M. sornayi Collignon, 1962
