= Bochianites =

Bochianites Temporal range: Tithonian–Hauterivian

Scientific classification
- Domain: Eukaryota
- Kingdom: Animalia
- Phylum: Mollusca
- Class: Cephalopoda
- Subclass: †Ammonoidea
- Order: †Ammonitida
- Suborder: †Ancyloceratina
- Family: †Bochianitidae
- Genus: †Bochianites; Lory, 1898

Type species
- Baculites neocomiensis d'Orbignyi, 1842

Extinct genus of ammonites

Bochianites is a straight shelled ammonite which lived from the Upper Jurassic, Tithonian, to the Lower Cretaceous, Hauterivian in what is now Europe, Greenland, Africa, North America and Asia. The shell is long, narrow, moderately expanding; smooth or with weak to strong oblique annular ribs. Sutural elements are short and boxy. The umbilical lobe, which lies between the lateral lobe and dorsal lobe, on either side, is about the same size as the lobule dividing the first lateral saddle.

Janenschites, Kabylites, and Baculina are all similar to Bochianites, differing mostly in details of the suture. Janenschites has long, narrow, and more denticulate elements. Kabylites has a larger umbilical lobe, more or less the same size as the first lateral lobe. Baculina, which is in doubt, may have been based on a Bochianites that was worn.

== Species ==
Species within the genus Bochianites include:

- B. aculeatus Hoedemaeker in Hoedemaeker et al., 2016
- ?B. ambiguus Arkadiev, Rogov et Perminov, 2011
- B. ambikyensis Collignon, 1962
- B. baculitoides Arnould-Saget, 1953
- B. baculitoides Arnould-Saget, 1953
- B. crymensis Arkadiev, 2008
- B. demissus Bodylevsky, 1960
- B. furcatocostatus Mandov, 1975
- B. gerardianus Stoliczka, 1866
- B. glaber Kitchin, 1908
- B. glennensis Anderson, 1945
- B. goubechensis Mandov, 1971
- B. gracilis Thomson, 1974
- ?B. kiliani Turner, 1962
- B. laevis Liu, 1988
- B. maldonadi Karsten, 1858
- ?B. meyrati Ooster, 1860
- B. neocomiensiformis Michalík & Vasíček, 1989 nomen nudum
- B. neocomiensis d'Orbignyi, 1842
- B. nodocostatus Mandov, 1971
- B. noricus Winkler, 1868
- B. oosteri Sarasin & Schöndelmayer, 1902
- B. paskentaensis Anderson, 1938
- ?B. renevieri Ooster, 1860
- B. thieuloidis Cantú Chapa, 1976
- B. versteeghi Boehm, 1904
- B. weteringi Boehm, 1904
- B. xizangensis Liu, 1988
- B. zigzag Etayo-Serna, 1985
