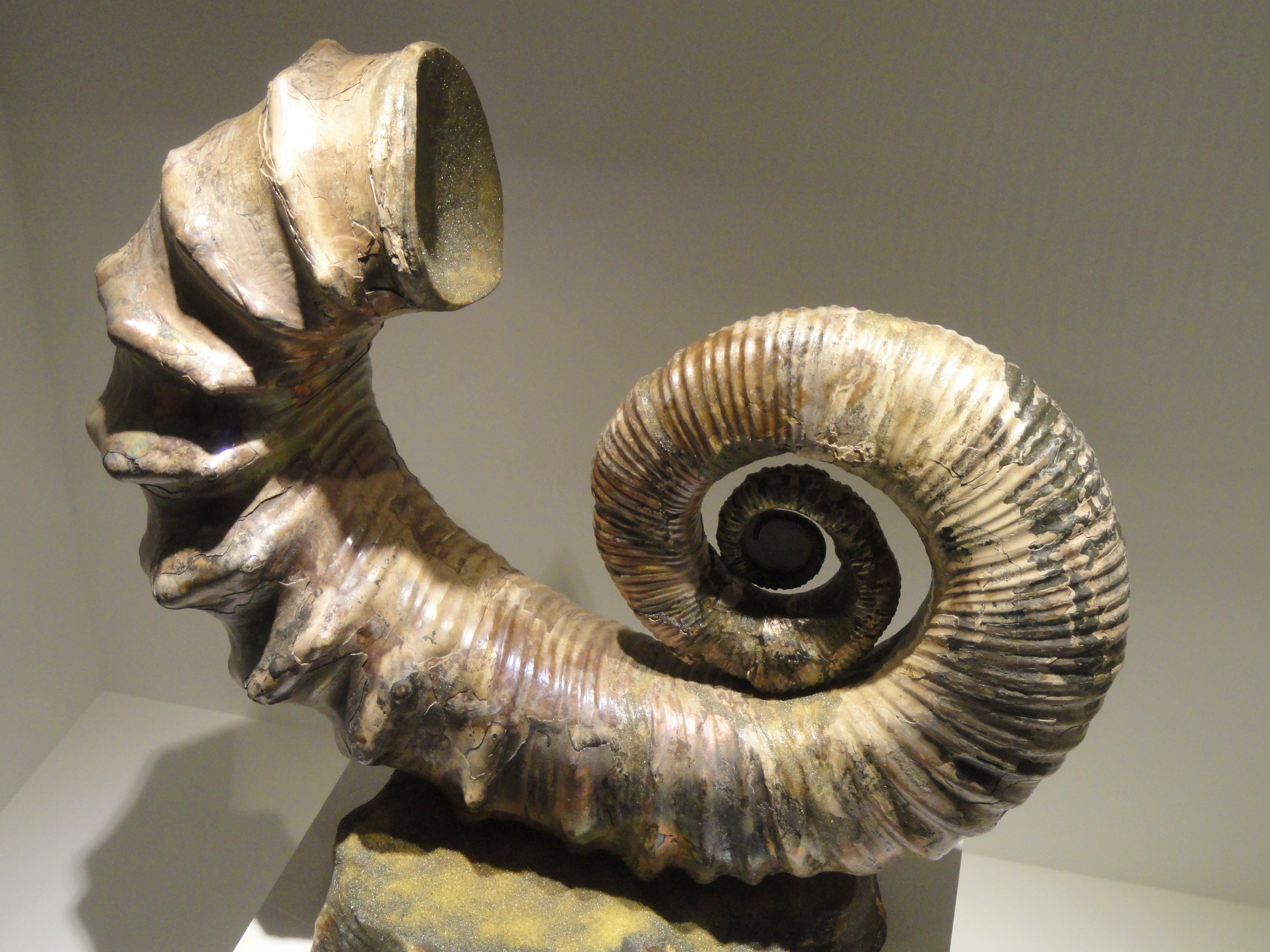
- Australiceras species

Scientific classification
- Kingdom: Animalia
- Phylum: Mollusca
- Class: Cephalopoda
- Subclass: †Ammonoidea
- Order: †Ammonitida
- Suborder: †Ancyloceratina
- Family: †Ancyloceratidae
- Genus: †Australiceras; Whitehouse

Species
- A. gracile; A. hirtzi; A. irregulare; A. jacki; A. lampros; A. robustum; A. transiente

= Australiceras =

Australiceras Temporal range: Aptian

Genus of molluscs (fossil)

Australiceras is an extinct ammonite genus from the upper part of the Early Cretaceous, Aptian stage, included in the family Ancyloceratidae.

== Description ==
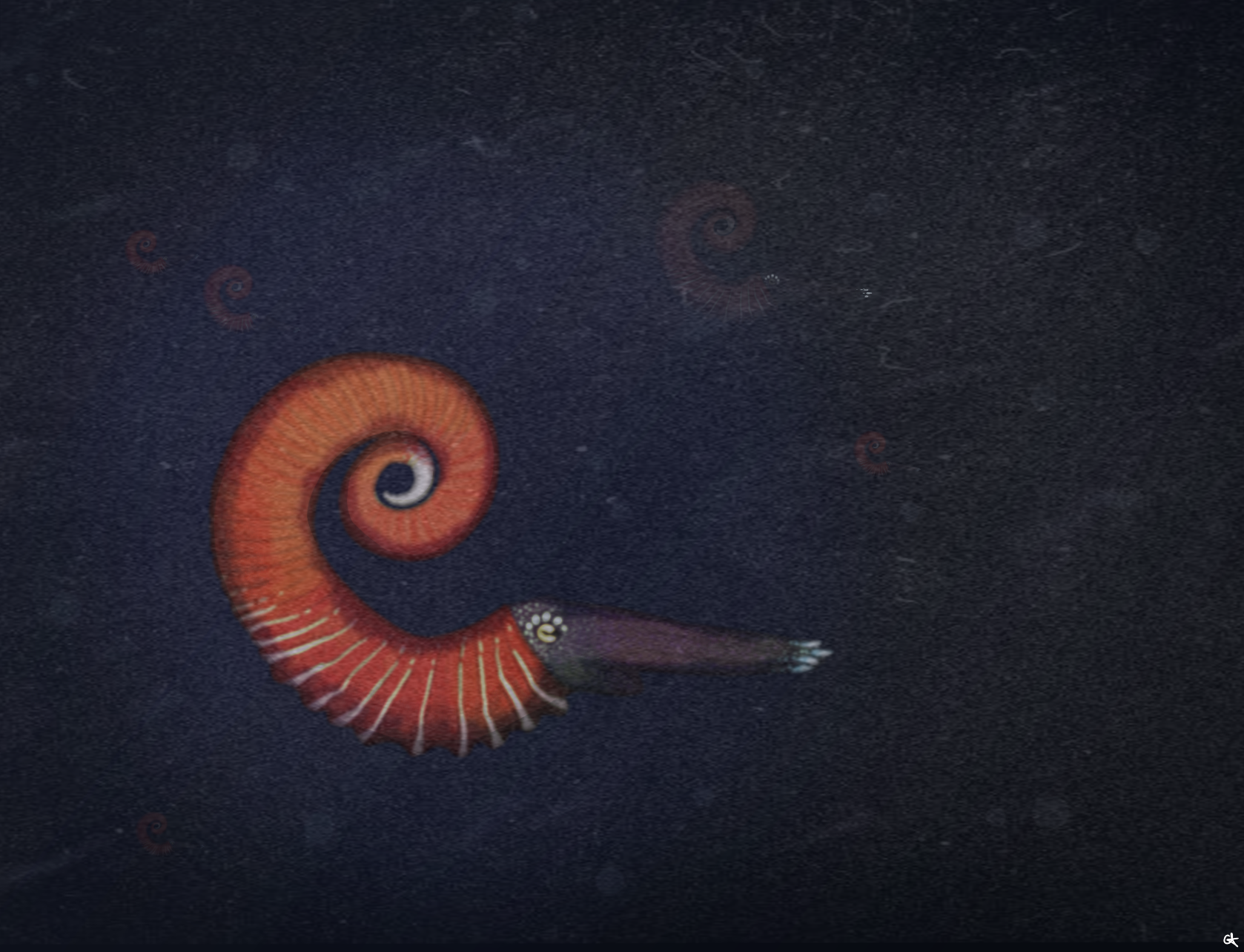
Life restoration

Australiceras has an evolute shell, coiled with all whorls showing in keeping with its inclusion in the Ancyloceratida. The inner, early, whorls bear ribs that alternate between those that are smooth and those the bear stout blunt or conical tubercles. Ribs on the outer whorls become free of tubercles and end up all smooth.

Australiceras bears some resemblance to Tropaeum and Balearites, both related genera, some even considers that Australiceras is actually synonymous with Tropaeum, while others denying that.

The type species is Australiceras jacki.
