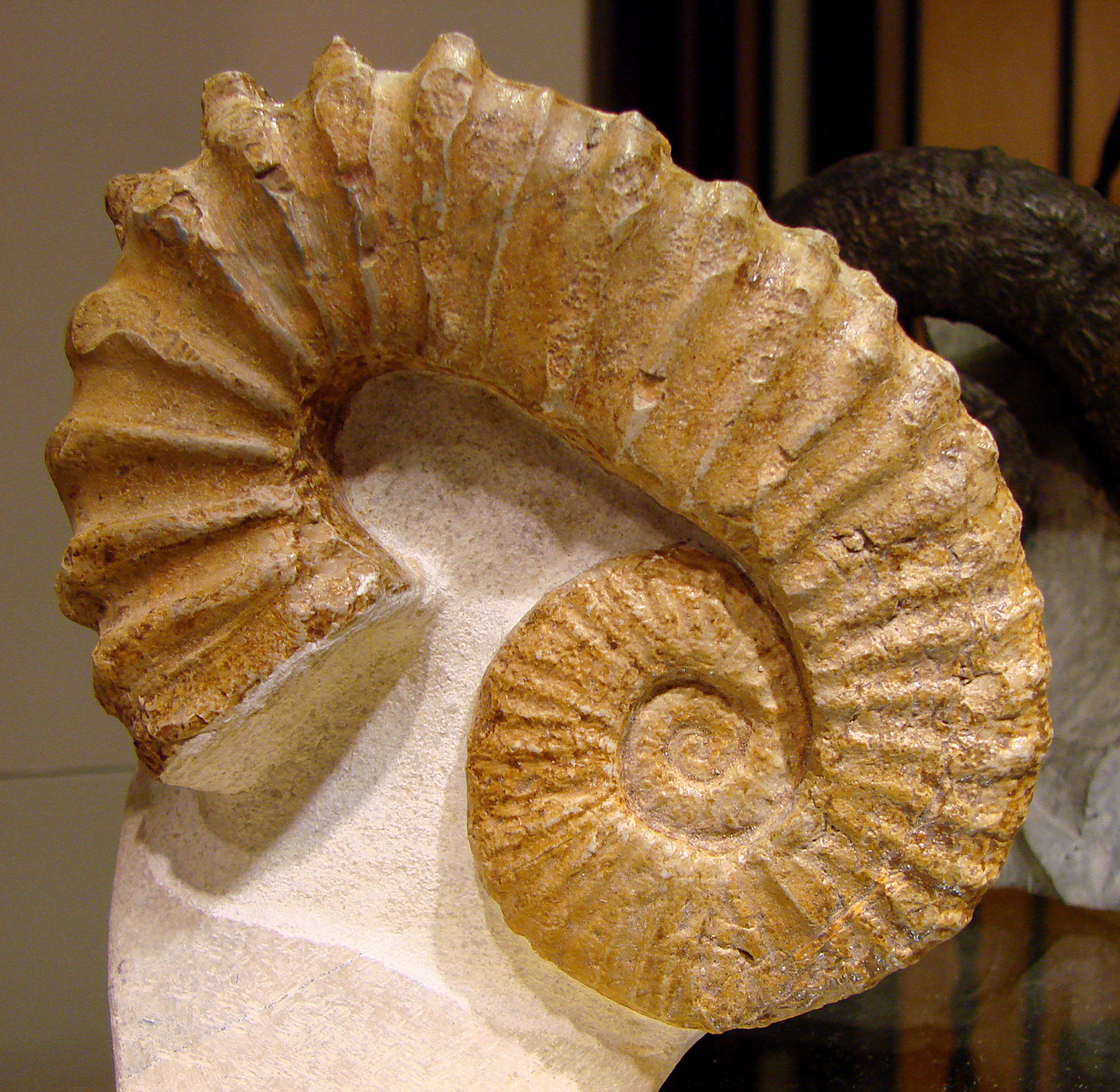

Scientific classification
- Domain: Eukaryota
- Kingdom: Animalia
- Phylum: Mollusca
- Class: Cephalopoda
- Subclass: †Ammonoidea
- Order: †Ammonitida
- Suborder: †Ancyloceratina
- Family: †Ancyloceratidae
- Genus: †Pseudocrioceras; Spath, 1924

= Pseudocrioceras =

Pseudocrioceras Temporal range: Barremian - Aptian

Genus of molluscs (fossil)

Pseudocrioceras is an extinct genus of ammonites. The species Pseudocrioceras anthulai has been found in strata from the Barremian - Aptian age of Chipatá, Santander, Colombia and is known from Georgia and Dagestan. The species Pseudocrioceras duvalianum and Pseudocrioceras fasciculare are found in the Barremian of France.

This genus was an actively mobile carnivore with a nektonic lifestyle.

== Species ==
- Pseudocrioceras anthulai Eristavi 1955
- Pseudocrioceras duvalianum (d'Orbigny, 1842)
- Pseudocrioceras'fasciculare (d'Orbigny, 1840)
