= Kabylites =

Kabylites Temporal range: Barremian

Scientific classification
- Domain: Eukaryota
- Kingdom: Animalia
- Phylum: Mollusca
- Class: Cephalopoda
- Subclass: †Ammonoidea
- Order: †Ammonitida
- Suborder: †Ancyloceratina
- Family: †Bochianitidae
- Genus: †Kabylites; Durand Delga, 1954

Species
- see text

Extinct genus of molluscs

Kabylites is a narrow, straight shelled Lower Cretaceous ancyloceratid resembling Bochianites in general form. Kabylites differs from Bochianites in having an umbilical lobe more or less the same size as the first lateral lobe. In Bochianites the umbilical lobe is much reduced in size.

Kabylites, which is known from Europe, north Africa, and Japan, also follows Bochianites sequentially, first appearing in the Barremian and continuing into the Lower Aptian. Bochianites lasted from the Tithonian at the end of the Jurassic to the Hauterivian which just precedes the Barremian.
