= Uhligia =

Uhligia may refer to:

- Uhligia (beetle), a genus of beetles in the family Mordellidae
- Uhligia (ammonite), a genus of cephalopods in the family Ancyloceratidae
