= Ropoloceras =

Ropoloceras Temporal range: Hauterivian

Scientific classification
- Domain: Eukaryota
- Kingdom: Animalia
- Phylum: Mollusca
- Class: Cephalopoda
- Subclass: †Ammonoidea
- Order: †Ammonitida
- Suborder: †Ancyloceratina
- Family: †Crioceratitidae
- Genus: †Ropoloceras; Vermeulen et al., 2012

Type species
- Crioceras seitzi Sarkar, 1955

Species
- R. angulicostatum d'Orbigny, 1841; R. seitzi Sarkar, 1955

Genus of ammonites

Ropoloceras is an extinct ancyloceratin genus included in the family Crioceratitidae, subclass Ammonoidea, from the Upper Hauterivian. Fossils belonging to this genera were found on localities that are now in Switzerland, France and Spain.
