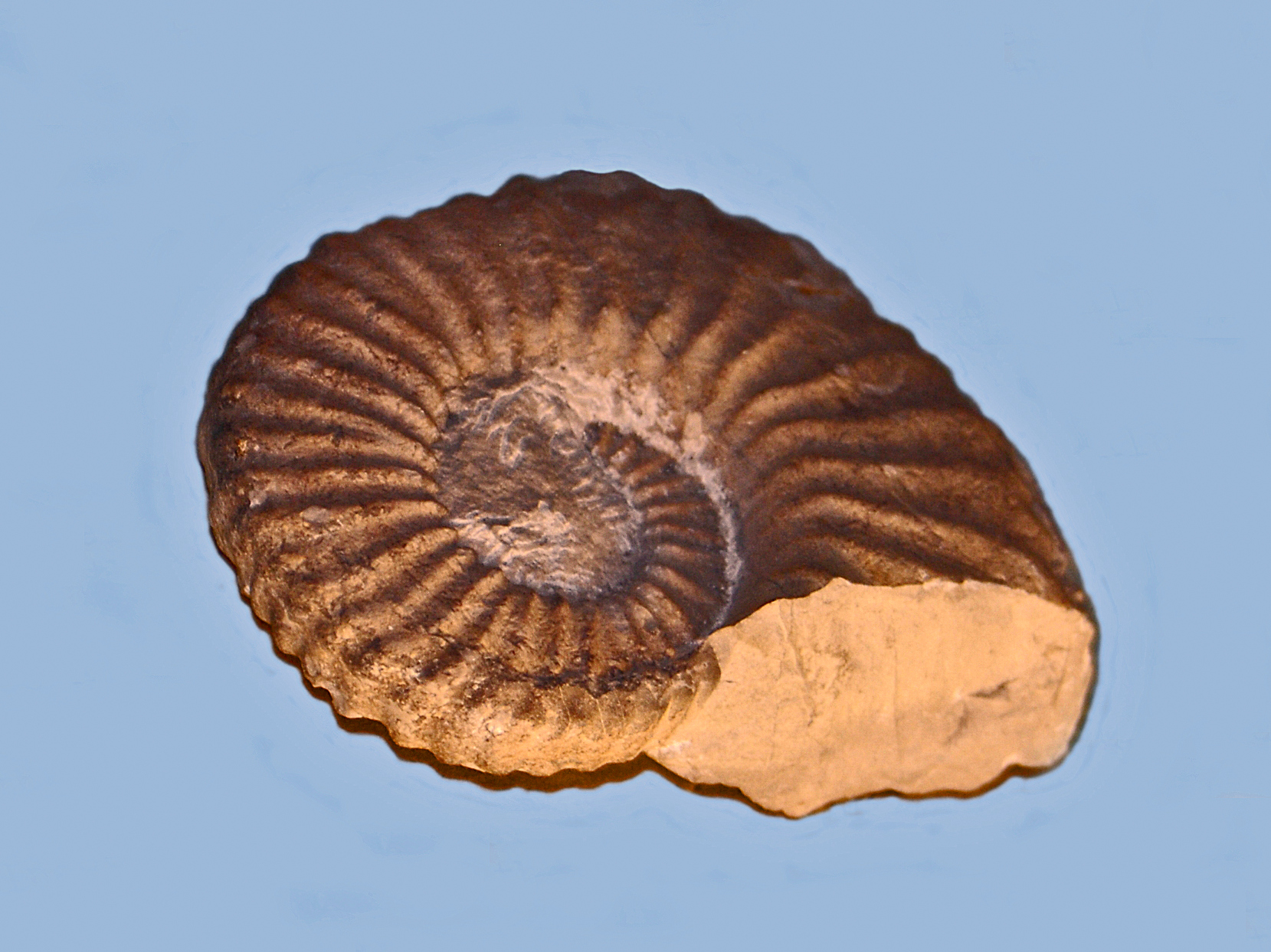
- Fossil shells of Hemihoplites soulieri from Alpes-de-Haute-Provence, on display at Galerie de paléontologie et d'anatomie comparée in Paris

Scientific classification
- Kingdom: Animalia
- Phylum: Mollusca
- Class: Cephalopoda
- Subclass: †Ammonoidea
- Order: †Ammonitida
- Suborder: †Ancyloceratina
- Family: †Hemihoplitidae
- Genus: †Hemihoplites; Spath, 1924

= Hemihoplites =

Hemihoplites Temporal range: Cretaceous, 136.4–125.45 Ma

Genus of molluscs (fossil)

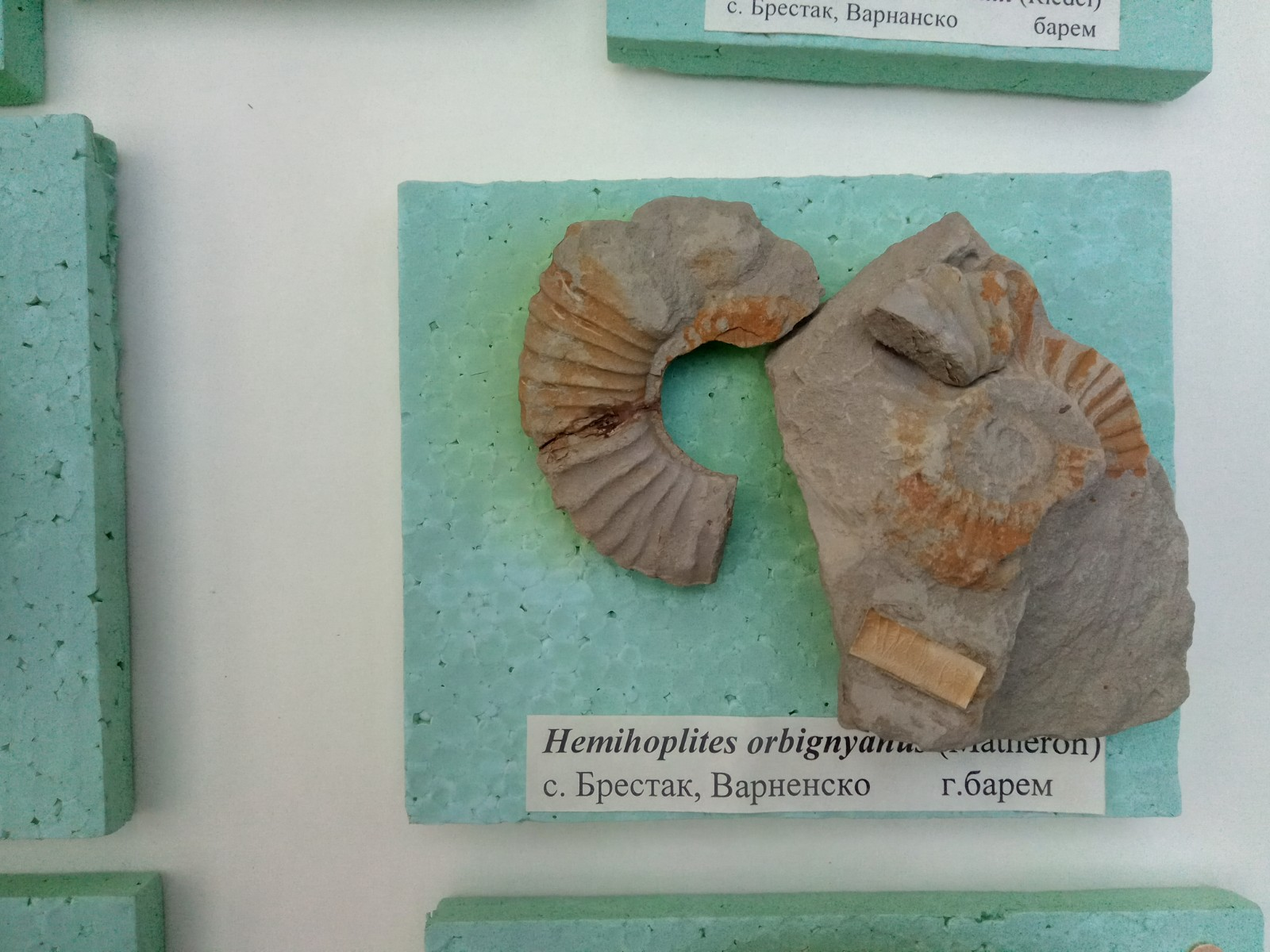
Hemihoplites orbignyanus (Matheron), Upper Barremian, Brestak (Coll. St. Breskovski) at the Sofia University Museum of Paleontology and Historical Geology

Hemihoplites is an extinct genus of ammonoid cephalopods belonging to the family Hemihoplitidae. These fast-moving nektonic carnivores lived in the Cretaceous period, from the Hauterivian age to the Barremian age.

== Description ==
It is evolute, compressed. The Whorl section is rectangular. The ribs are simple or branching or long or short, well spaced, straight or slightly flexuous, crossing flat venter transversely, typically with distinct umbilical and ventrolateral tubercles.

== Species ==
- Hemihoplites feraudianus (d'Orbigny, 1841)
- Hemihoplites mexicanus Imlay, 1940
- Hemihoplites ploszkiewiczi Riccardi and Aguirre Urreta, 1989
- Hemihoplites soulieri (Matheron, 1878)
- Hemihoplites varicostatus Riccardi and Aguirre Urreta, 1989

== Distribution ==
Fossils of species within this genus have been found in the Cretaceous rocks of Antarctida (Alexander Island), Bulgaria, southeastern France, Mexico, Slovakia, South Africa and Trinidad and Tobago.
