= Acantholytoceras =

Acantholytoceras Temporal range: Cretaceous

Scientific classification
- Kingdom: Animalia
- Phylum: Mollusca
- Class: Cephalopoda
- Subclass: †Ammonoidea
- Order: †Ammonitida
- Suborder: †Ancyloceratina
- Family: †Crioceratitidae
- Genus: †Acantholytoceras; Spath, 1923

Type species
- Acantholytoceras longispinum (Uhlig, 1883)

Extinct genus of ammonite

Acantholytoceras is an extinct genus of ammonite that belongs to the family Crioceratitidae. It lived during the Cretaceous period across Europe in places such as Spain, France and Serbia.

It was likely a fast-moving nektonic predator.

== Taxonomy ==
=== Species ===
As of May 2026, this genus contains four described species. They are listed below:

- Acantholytoceras longispinum (Uhlig, 1883)
- Acantholytoceras subcirculare Avram 2002
- Acantholytoceras tenuicostatum (Thomel, 1965)
- Acantholytoceras thomeli Delanoy et al. 2024
