= Acrioceratidae =

Acrioceratidae Temporal range: Late Hauterivian- Early Barremian)

Scientific classification
- Kingdom: Animalia
- Phylum: Mollusca
- Class: Cephalopoda
- Subclass: †Ammonoidea
- Order: †Ammonitida
- Suborder: †Ancyloceratina
- Superfamily: †Ancyloceratoidea
- Family: †Acrioceratidae; Vermeulen, 2004

Genera
- Brainaella Frau et al. 2017; Dissimilites Sarkar 1954; Hoplocrioceras Spath 1924; Toxoceratoides Spath 1924

Extinct family of ammonites

Acrioceratidae is a family of heteromorph ammonites included in the Ancyloceratoidea comprising ancyloceratid-like forms that start off with a coiled juvenile section, followed by a straight or curved shaft ending in a hook. Two described genera are included, Acrioceras and Dissimilites.

The Acrioceratidae form a link, or evolutionary transition, between the loosely coiled Crioceratidae and the commonly tuberculate and heavy hooked Ancyloceratidae. Although resembling Acrioceras in general form, Toxancyloceras is included in the Ancyloceratidae where it resides as a transitional form.

The primary morphological distinction between the Acrioceratidae and Ancycloceratidae is that the Acrioceratidae generally lack the tubercles and spines characteristic of the ancyloceratids. They differ from the ancestral Crioceratidae in that, like the Ancyloceratidae, they are truly heteromorphic (crioceratids aren't) with distinct growth phases.

The Treatise on Invertebrate Paleontology, 1957, Part L, included Acrioceras, the nominate genus, in the Ancyloceratidae, with Dissimilites considered synonymous.
