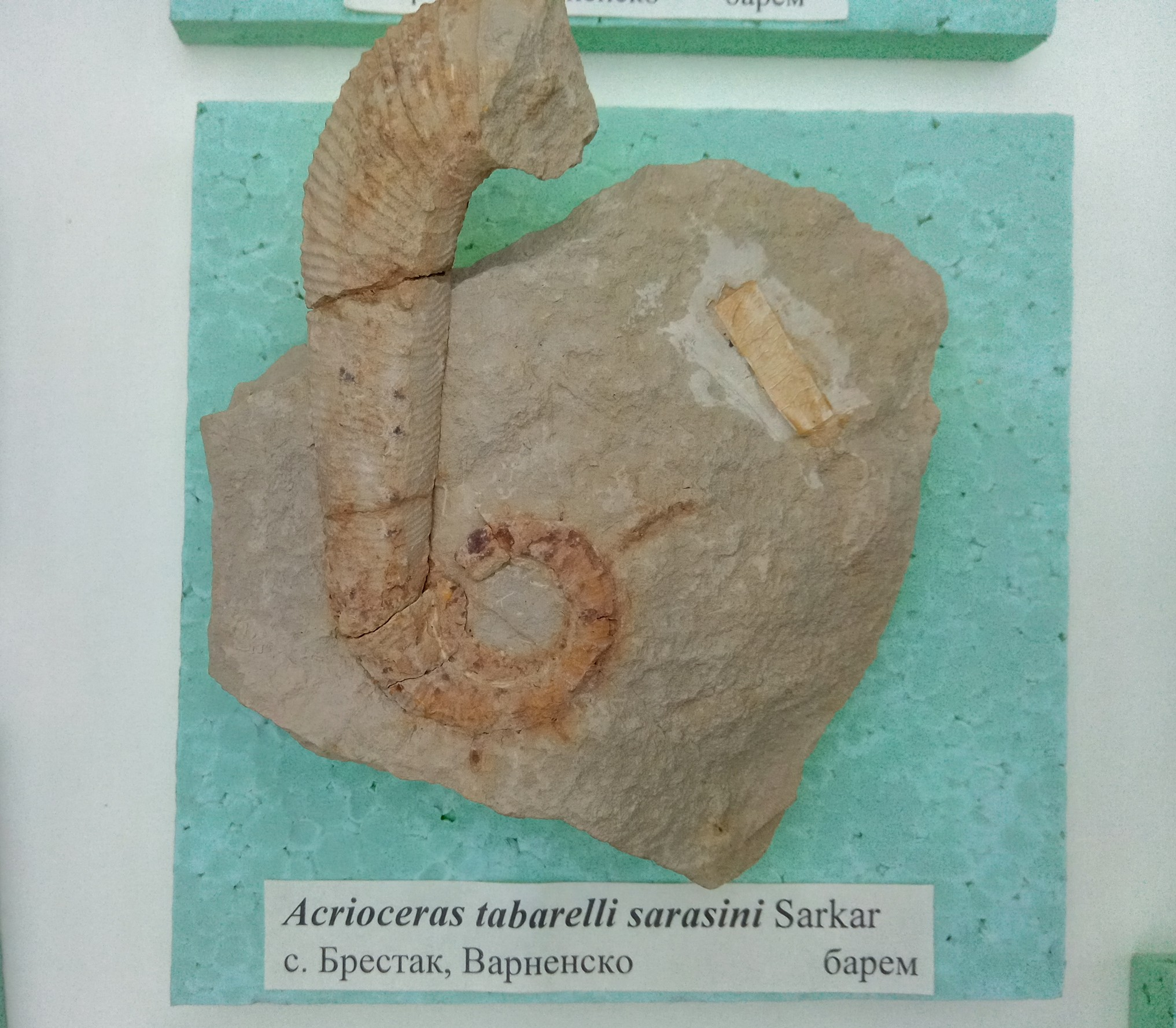
- Acrioceras tabarelli sarasini (Sarkar), Barremian, Brestak, (Coll. St. Breskovski) at the Sofia University Museum of Paleontology and Historical Geology

Scientific classification
- Kingdom: Animalia
- Phylum: Mollusca
- Class: Cephalopoda
- Subclass: †Ammonoidea
- Order: †Ammonitida
- Suborder: †Ancyloceratina
- Family: †Acrioceratidae
- Genus: †Acrioceras; Hyatt 1900

Type species
- Ancyloceras tabarelli (Astier, 1851)

Species
- A. hamlini Anderson, 1938; A. meriani Ooster, 1860; A. tabarelli Astier, 1851; A. vespertinum Anderson, 1938; A. voyanum Anderson, 1938

= Acrioceras =

Acrioceras Temporal range: Hauterivian-Barremian ~130–125.5 Ma

Genus of molluscs (fossil)

Acrioceras is an extinct genus of cephalopods belonging to the ammonite subclass.

== Description ==
A spire of one or two loosely coiled whorls followed by a short or long, straight or curved shaft, terminal hook, and short and or long final shaft. The ribs are generally fine and untuberculate, but sometimes the major ribs are enlarged and are carrying one to three tubercles. The ribs are single on the spire or the shaft but may branch from umbilical tubercles on the hook and the final shaft. The dorsum tends to become flat and the dorsolateral margin to become angular on the shaft and the hook.

== Distribution ==
Fossils of Acrioceras have been found in:

- Barremian Formation, Brestak, Bulgaria
- Ono Formation, California
- Paja Formation, Colombia
- Barremian Provence, France
- Georgia
- Subway Formation, Germany
- Maiolica Formation, Italy
- Ishido and Inagoe Formations, Japan
- San Lucas Formation, Mexico
- Taboulouart Formation, Morocco
- Hauterivian, Slovakia
- Makatini Formation, South Africa
- Hauterivian Murcia, Spain
