= Diamanticeras =

Diamanticeras Temporal range: Upper Hauterivian

Scientific classification
- Domain: Eukaryota
- Kingdom: Animalia
- Phylum: Mollusca
- Class: Cephalopoda
- Subclass: †Ammonoidea
- Order: †Ammonitida
- Suborder: †Ancyloceratina
- Family: †Crioceratitidae
- Genus: †Diamanticeras; Jean Vermeulen, 2004

Type species
- Neohoplites diamantensis Gerth, 1925

Species
- Diamanticeras bederi Gerth, 1925; Diamanticeras diamantense Gerth, 1925; Diamanticeras schlagintweiti Giovine, 1950

Genus of Cretaceous ammonite cephalopods

Diamanticeras is an extinct genus of Cretaceous-aged ammonite cephalopod belonging to the family Crioceratitidae. It is probably phyletically linked to genus Crioceratites. Their fossils were found in Chile and Argentina.

== Description ==
This genus is a lineage of non-tuberculate species that is characteristic by its rewinded shells. Primary ribs are rounded, wide, sometimes bifurcating. They are crossing the venter without interruption and can be paired. Secondary ribs are more or less vigorous, weakened or erased at venter and they are also usually simple.
