= Turrilitina =

Turrilitina Temporal range: Hauterivian - Maastrichtian

Scientific classification
- Kingdom: Animalia
- Phylum: Mollusca
- Class: Cephalopoda
- Subclass: †Ammonoidea
- Order: †Ammonitida
- Suborder: †Turrilitina; Beznosov & Mikhailova, 1983

Superfamilies
- Turrilitoidea; Ptychoceratoidea; Scaphatoidea

Suborder of molluscs (fossil)

Turrilitina is a proposed suborder of Cretaceous heteromorph ammonoid cephalopods derived from the Lytoceratidae in the Hauterivian stage of the Lower Cretaceous that would include the superfamilies Turrilitoidea, Ptychoceratoidea, and Scaphatoidea.

Turrilitina was recognized as a distinct group or clade from the Ancyloceratina as defined by Weidmann, 1966, by Beznosov and Mikhailova in 1983. The group may have its origin in the ammonitid superfamily Perisphinctaceae.

Turrilitina is the Turrilitaceae of Arkell et al 1957, including the Ptychoceratidae and Macroscaphitidae, along with the Scaphitaceae which the Treatise on Invertebrate Paleontology shows with a separate and later derivation from the Lytoceratidae.

Acceptance of Turrilitina as a valid suborder is not widely held, with most authors preferring the placement of Turriloidea, Ptychoceratoidea, and Scaphatoidea in Ancyloceratina.
