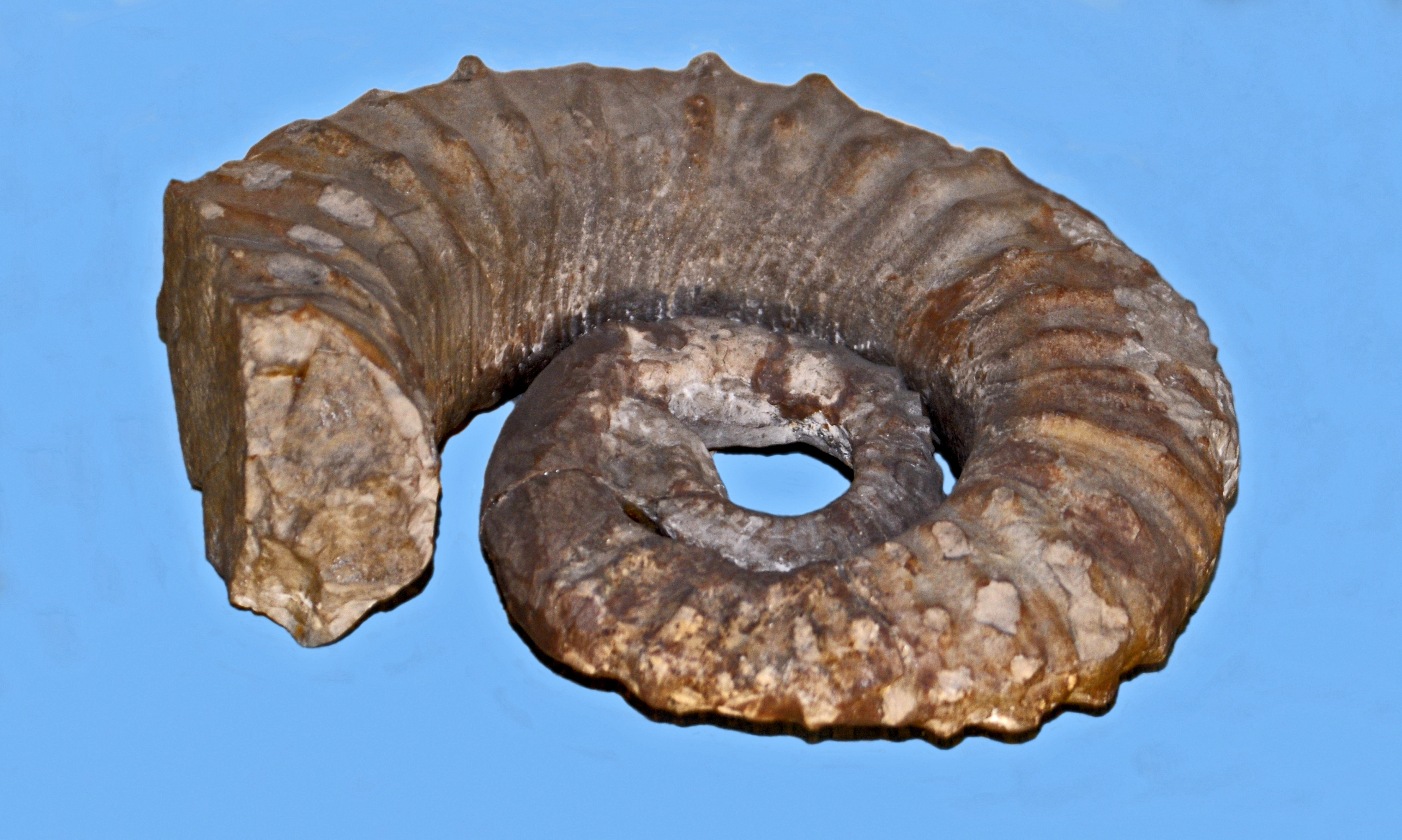
- Fossil shells of Gassendiceras alpinum from Alpes-de-Haute-Provence, on display at Galerie de paléontologie et d'anatomie comparée in Paris

Scientific classification
- Kingdom: Animalia
- Phylum: Mollusca
- Class: Cephalopoda
- Subclass: †Ammonoidea
- Order: †Ammonitida
- Suborder: †Ancyloceratina
- Family: †Hemihoplitidae
- Genus: †Gassendiceras; Bert, Delanoy & Bersac, 2006

= Gassendiceras =

Gassendiceras Temporal range: Early Cretaceous (Barremian), 130.0–125.0 Ma

Genus of molluscs (fossil)

Gassendiceras is an extinct genus of ammonoid cephalopods belonging to the family Hemihoplitidae. They lived in the Cretaceous period, Barremian age.

== Etymology ==
The genus name Gassendiceras honors the French philosopher and scientist Pierre Gassendi (1592 – 1655).

== Species ==
- Gassendiceras quelquejeui Bert, Delanoy & Bersac, 2006
- Gassendiceras alpinum (d'Orbigny, 1850) (Synonym Crioceras alpinum)
- Gassendiceras enayi Bert, Delanoy & Bersac, 2006
- Gassendiceras coulletae Bert, Delanoy & Bersac, 2006
- Gassendiceras hammatoptychum (Uhlig, 1883)

== Description ==
Shells of Gassendiceras species can reach a diameter of about 300 millimetres (12 in).

== Distribution ==
Fossils of species within this genus have been found in the Cretaceous rocks of southeastern France.
