= Balearites =

Balearites Temporal range: Hauterivian

Scientific classification
- Domain: Eukaryota
- Kingdom: Animalia
- Phylum: Mollusca
- Class: Cephalopoda
- Subclass: †Ammonoidea
- Order: †Ammonitida
- Suborder: †Ancyloceratina
- Family: †Crioceratitidae
- Genus: †Balearites; Sarkar 1954

Type species
- Crioceras baleare Nolan, 1894

Synonyms
- Binelliceras Sarkar, 1955

Genus of molluscs (fossil)

Balearites is an extinct ancyloceratin genus included in the family Crioceratitidae, subclass Ammonoidea, from the Upper Hauterivian.

The shell, or conch, of Balearites is planispiral; whorls compressed, fairly flat sided, barely in contact (sub-gyroconic); venter (outer rim) rounded; ribs fine, flexuous, branching equally in 2s, 3s, or 4s from weak umbilical tubercles.

Genera assumed to be related include Aegocrioceras, Crioceratites, and Hoplocrioceras.

== Species ==
Species within the genus Balearites include:

- Balearites angulicostatiformis Hoedemaker, 2013
- Balearites balearis Nolan, 1894
- Balearites binelli Astier, 1851
- Balearites catulloi Parona, 1898
- Balearites ibizensis Wiedmann, 1962
- Balearites krenkeli Sarkar, 1955 (= B. montclusensis Wiedmann, 1962)
- Balearites labrousseae Sarkar, 1955
- Balearites lorioli Dimitrova, 1967
- Balearites michalíki Vašíček & Malek, 2017
- Balearites mortilleti Pictet & Loriol, 1858
- Balearites nolani Sarkar, 1955
- Balearites nowaki Sarkar, 1955
- Balearites oicasensis Hoedemaker, 2013
- Balearites pseudothurmanii Dimitrova, 1967
- Balearites rotundatus Sarkar, 1955
- Balearites shankariae Sarkar, 1955
- Balearites theodomirensis Hoedemaker, 2013

== Distribution ==
Fossils belonging to this genera were found on localities that are now in Slovakia, Austria, France, Spain, Switzerland, Hungary, Italy, Bulgaria, Russia and Romania.
