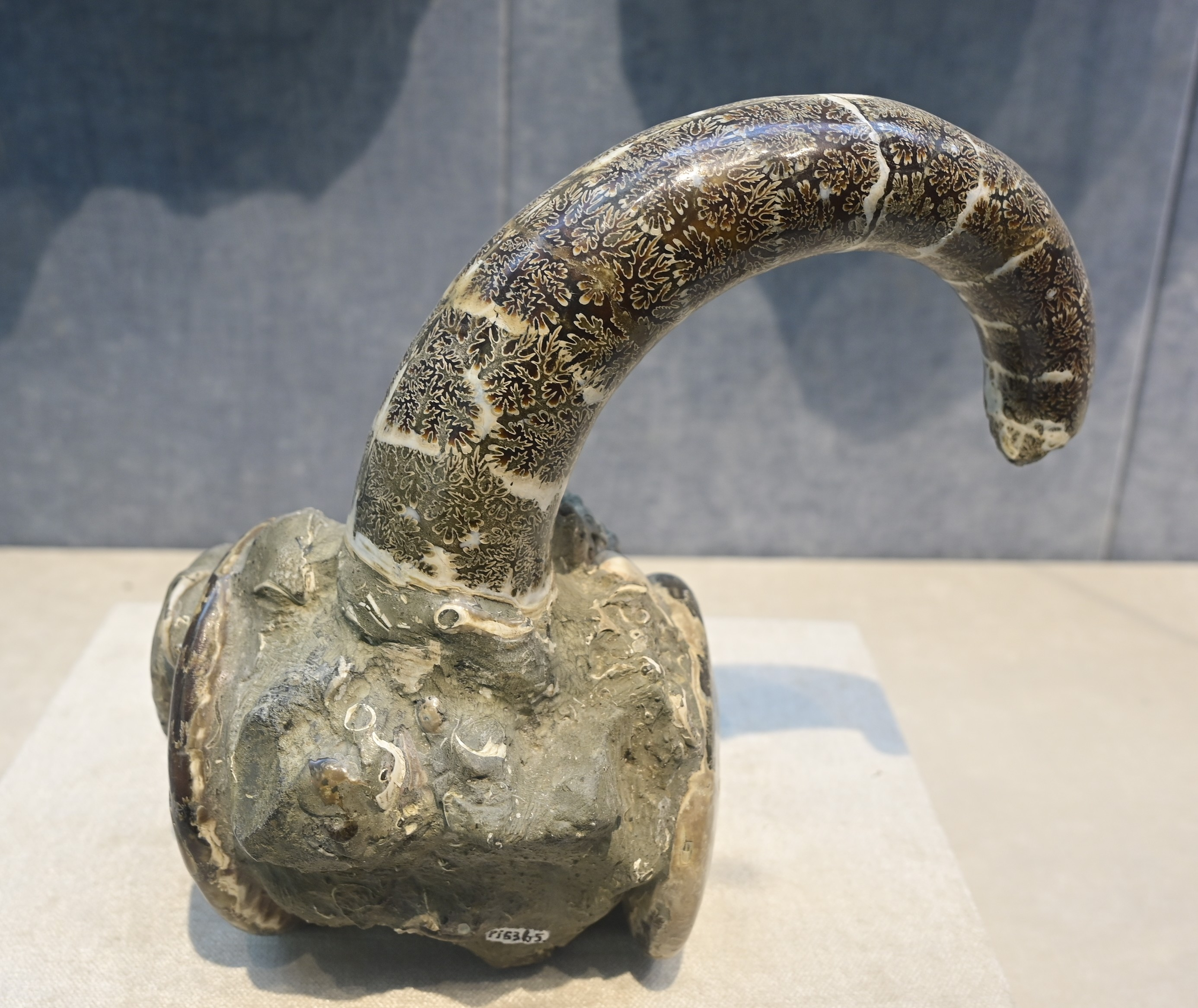
- Fossil specimen, Beijing Museum of Natural History

Scientific classification
- Kingdom: Animalia
- Phylum: Mollusca
- Class: Cephalopoda
- Subclass: †Ammonoidea
- Order: †Ammonitida
- Suborder: †Ancyloceratina
- Superfamily: †Turrilitoidea
- Family: †Hamitidae; Gill, 1871
- Genus: †Hamites; Parkinson, 1811

Subgenera
- Eohamites; Hamitella; Helicohamites; Lytohamites; Planohamites; Psilohamites; Sziveshamites

= Hamites (genus) =

Hamites Temporal range: Early Cretaceous–Late Cretaceous

Genus of molluscs (fossil)

Hamites ("hook-like") is a genus of heteromorph ammonite that evolved late in the Aptian stage of the Early Cretaceous and lasted into the Cenomanian stage of the Late Cretaceous. The genus is almost certainly paraphyletic but remains in wide use as a "catch all" for heteromorph ammonites of the superfamily Turrilitoidea that do not neatly fit into the more derived groupings. In an attempt to identify clades within the genus, it has been divided up into a series of new genera or subgenera by different palaeontologists, including Eohamites, Hamitella, Helicohamites, Lytohamites, Planohamites, Psilohamites, and Sziveshamites.

The type species is Hamites attenuatus from the early Albian, named by James Sowerby in his Mineral Conchology of Great Britain of 1814, although the genus itself was created by James Parkinson in his 1811 book Organic Remains of the Former World. This James Parkinson is best known as the first scientific description of a disease he called the Shaking Palsy, now referred to as Parkinson's disease in his honour.

== Morphology and ecology ==
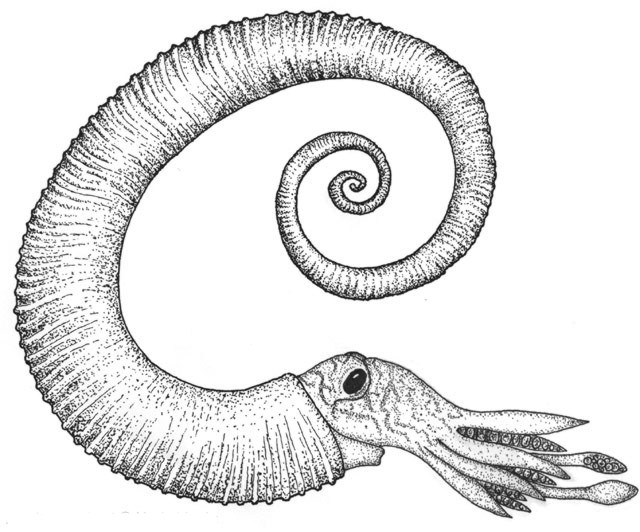
Life restoration

Hamites species are characterised by a shell that began with an open, sometimes helical, regular spiral that either opened into a single large hook, or else formed three parallel shafts that gave the mature shell the approximate appearance of a paper clip. No Hamites had spines or other such ornamentation on the shell, but several species appear to have developed apertural modifications when mature; that is, once the ammonite had grown to its final size, the aperture became constricted and was bounded by one or two thickened ribs, known as collars. These have been observed on other ammonites as well, and are assumed to be signs of sexual dimorphism.

The open shell of these ammonites would have made them poor swimmers because of drag, but beyond that fact, very little is certain about their mode of life. It is widely assumed that they were planktonic, perhaps catching small prey in the manner of jellyfish, but repaired shell damage apparently caused by crabs may indicate that they spent at least some time close to the sea floor.

== Phylogeny ==
The genus Hamites is of particular interest to palaeontologists because the species included in the genus span a wide range of morphologies including ones apparently similar to several more derived groups of heteromorph ammonites. The genus rapidly diversified during the Albian into a number of morphologically distinct lineages that seem to have given rise to at least three other families of heteromorphs, the Baculitidae, Turrilitidae, and Scaphitidae. The lineage that gave rise to the helical Turrilitidae, for example, had a shell that initially grew as a helix before straightening out; the Turrilitidae thus appear to have been derived from neotenic Hamites that retained the helically-coiled juvenile morphology of Hamites into adulthood.

== See also ==
- Baculites
- Scaphites
- Turrilites
