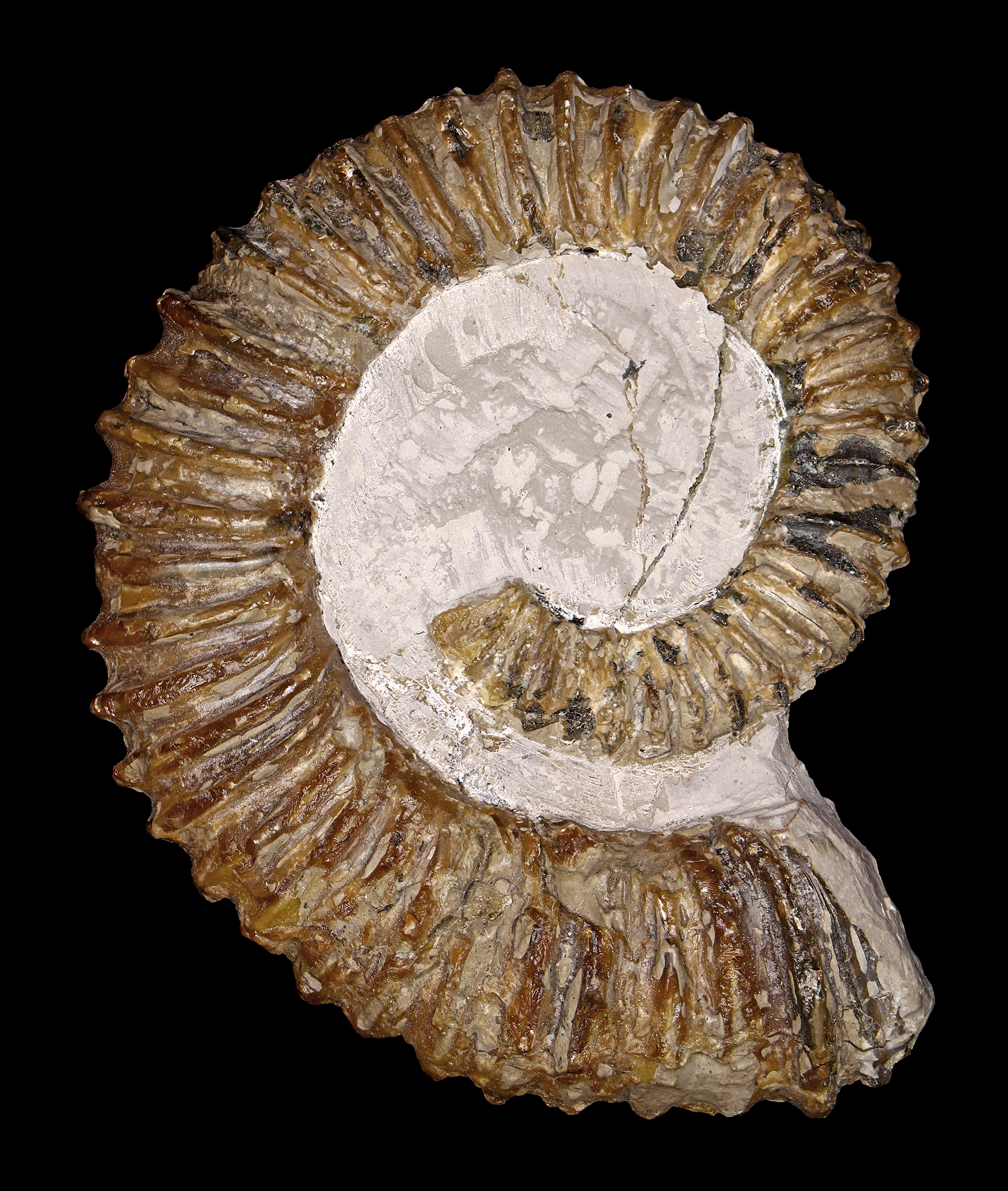

Scientific classification
- Domain: Eukaryota
- Kingdom: Animalia
- Phylum: Mollusca
- Class: Cephalopoda
- Subclass: †Ammonoidea
- Order: †Ammonitida
- Suborder: †Ancyloceratina
- Family: †Aegocrioceratidae
- Genus: †Aegocrioceras; Spath, 1924

= Aegocrioceras =

Aegocrioceras Temporal range: Early Hauterivian

Aegocrioceras is an extinct ammonite genus of cephalopod from the Lower Cretaceous included in the Ammonitida. It is known from northern Europe.

Aegocrioceras is coiled in an open planispiral; whorls are strongly ribbed and bear spines on the outer shoulders (ventro-lateral) of the inner whorls. Aegocrioceras is similar to the earlier Upper Valanginian Juddiceras of Germany and to the later Shasticrioceras from the Barremian of California and Japan.

Aegocrioceras was placed in the "Crioceratidae" (Ancyloceratidae, Crioceratinae) in Part L of the American Treatise on Invertebrate Paleontology published in 1957. Since then it has been reassigned to the Aegocrioceratidae which is included in the superfamily Protancyloceratoidea.
