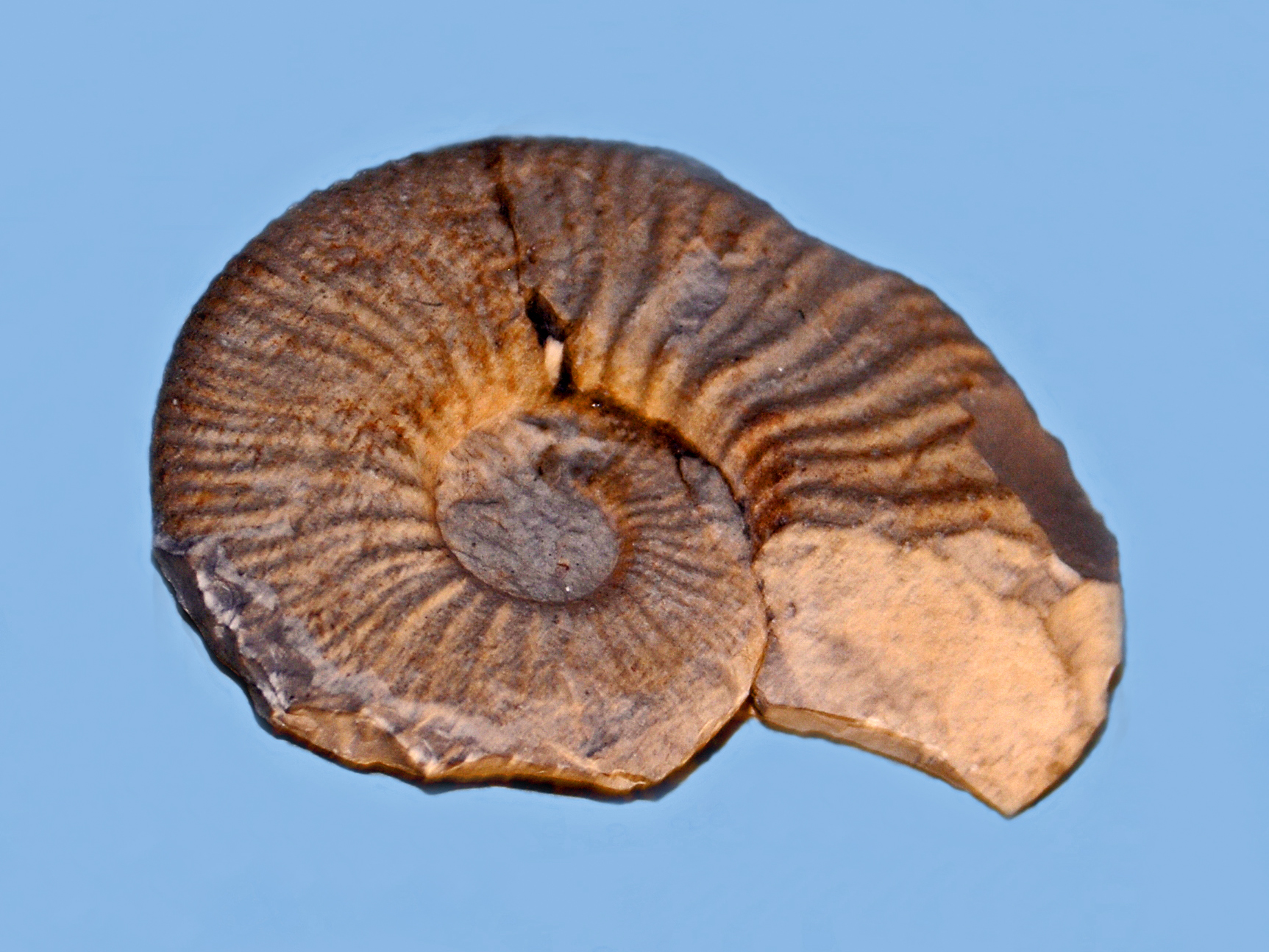
- Fossil shells of Pseudothurmannia species from Alpes-de-Haute-Provence, on display at Galerie de paléontologie et d'anatomie comparée in Paris

Scientific classification
- Domain: Eukaryota
- Kingdom: Animalia
- Phylum: Mollusca
- Class: Cephalopoda
- Subclass: †Ammonoidea
- Order: †Ammonitida
- Suborder: †Ancyloceratina
- Superfamily: †Ancyloceratoidea
- Family: †Crioceratitidae; Wright, 1952

= Crioceratitidae =

Crioceratitidae Temporal range: Cretaceous, 140.2–99.7 Ma

Extinct family of molluscs

Crioceratitidae is an extinct cephalopod family belonging to the subclass Ammonoidea and included in the order Ammonitida.

== Genera ==
- Acantholytoceras Spath, 1932
- Balearites Sarkar, 1954
- Crioceratites Leveillé, 1837
- Diamanticeras Vermeulen, 2004
- Menuthiocrioceras Collignon, 1949
- Paracostidiscus Busnardo, 2003
- Pseudothurmannia Spath, 1923
- Ropoloceras Vermeulen et al., 2012
- Sornayites Wiedmann, 1962
- Spathicrioceras Sarkar, 1955
- Spinocrioceras Kemper, 1973
- Subaspinoceras Thomel et al., 1987
- Theodorites Baraboshkin and Mikhailova, 2006
