= Baculina =

Baculina Temporal range: Valanginian

Scientific classification
- Kingdom: Animalia
- Phylum: Mollusca
- Class: Cephalopoda
- Subclass: †Ammonoidea
- Order: †Ammonitida
- Suborder: †Ancyloceratina
- Family: †Bochianitidae
- Genus: †Baculina d'Orbigny, 1850

Type species
- Baculina rouyana d'Orbigny, 1850

Extinct ammonoid genus

Baculina is an extinct ammonoid cephalopod genus belonging to the ancylocerid family Bochianitidae. Baculina is known from the Valanginian of the Lower Cretaceous.
