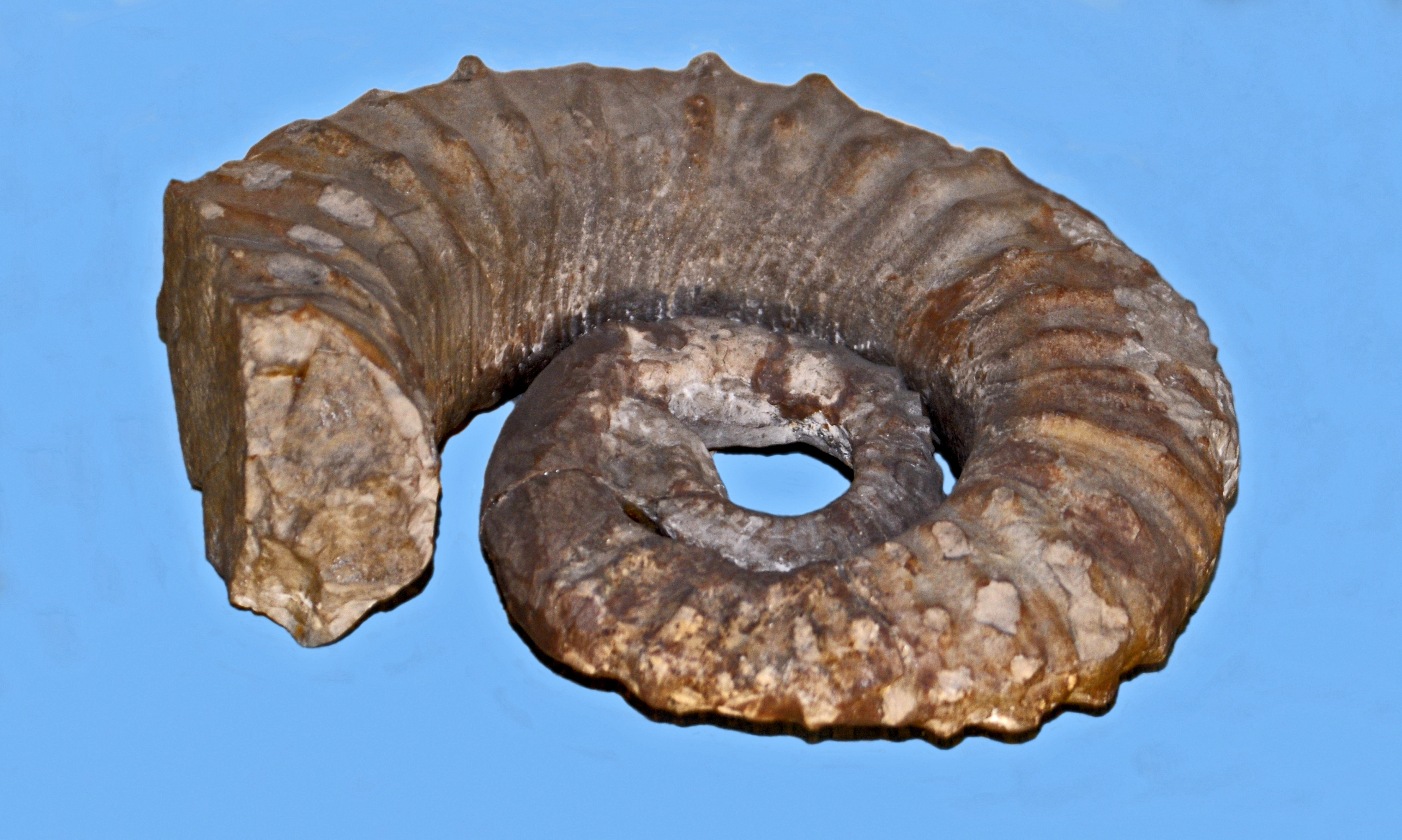
- Fossil shells of Gassendiceras alpinum from Alpes-de-Haute-Provence, on display at Galerie de paléontologie et d'anatomie comparée in Paris

Scientific classification
- Domain: Eukaryota
- Kingdom: Animalia
- Phylum: Mollusca
- Class: Cephalopoda
- Subclass: †Ammonoidea
- Order: †Ammonitida
- Suborder: †Ancyloceratina
- Superfamily: †Ancyloceratoidea
- Family: †Hemihoplitidae; Spath, 1924

= Hemihoplitidae =

Hemihoplitidae Temporal range: Cretaceous, 136.4–125.45 Ma

Extinct family of molluscs

Hemihoplitidae is an extinct family of ammonoid cephalopods belonging to the superfamily Ancyloceratoidea. Fossils of species within this family have been found in the Cretaceous rocks of southeastern France, Mexico, Slovakia, South Africa and Trinidad and Tobago.

== Genera ==
- Gassendiceras Bert, Delanoy & Bersac, 2006
- Hemihoplites Spath, 1924
