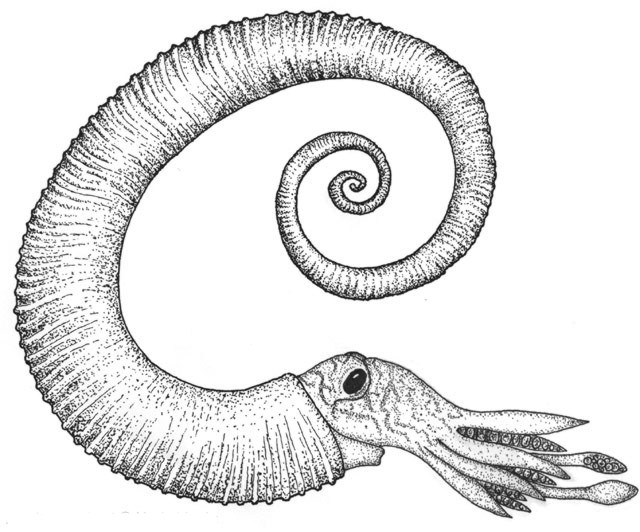
- illustration of Hamites sp.

Scientific classification
- Domain: Eukaryota
- Kingdom: Animalia
- Phylum: Mollusca
- Class: Cephalopoda
- Subclass: †Ammonoidea
- Order: †Ammonitida
- Suborder: †Ancyloceratina
- Superfamily: †Turrilitoidea; Gill, 1871

Families
- Anisoceratidae; Baculitidae; Diplomoceratidae; Hamitidae; Nostoceratidae; Turrilitidae

Synonyms
- Turrilitacaeae

= Turrilitoidea =

Turrilitoidea Temporal range: Aptian - Maastrichtian

Extinct superfamily of ammonites

Turrilitoidea is a diverse superfamily of Cretaceous ammonites generally considered as heteromorphic and commonly included in the suborder Ancyloceratina. Shells of this diverse group do not coil planospirally, as typical for most ammonites, but rather take on a variety of unique forms. Separation of Turrilitoidea along with Ptychoceratoidea and Scaphatoidea into a different suborder, Turrilitina, was proposed by Beznosov and Mikhailova in 1983 however this view is not accepted by most authors.

Some, such as the eponymous Turrilites, coiled helically, like an auger shell, while others, such as Hamites, had shells with long straight sections, while the one-of-a-kind Nipponites coiled in a way so as to appear as a ball of knots.

As with other ammonites, the last of the Turrilitoidea had perished by the end of the Cretaceous during the Cretaceous–Paleogene extinction event.
