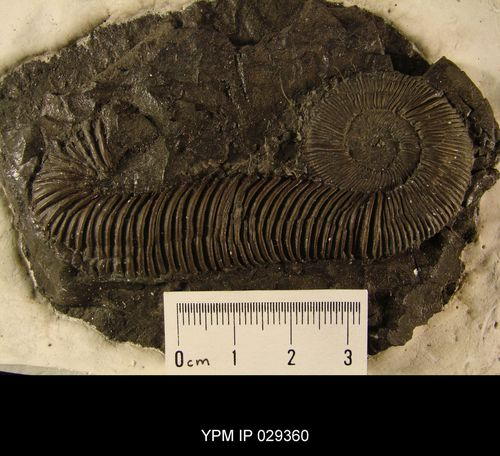
- Specimen of Macroscaphites yuani Meek 1876, from the Aptian (Early Cretaceous), Malenowit, Friedek, Schlesien.

Scientific classification
- Kingdom: Animalia
- Phylum: Mollusca
- Class: Cephalopoda
- Subclass: †Ammonoidea
- Order: †Ammonitida
- Suborder: †Turrilitina
- Superfamily: †Ptychoceratoidea
- Family: †Macroscaphitidae; Hyatt, 1900

Type genus
- †Macroscaphites Meek, 1876

= Macroscaphitidae =

Macroscaphitidae Temporal range: 130–93.5 Ma Lower Barremian – Lower Cenomanian

Extinct family of ptychoceratoid cephalopods

Macroscaphitidae (Greek μακρός, long and σκάφος, boat) is an extinct family of ptychoceratoid cephalopods from the subclass Ammonoidea that lived from the Lower Barremian to the Lower Cenomanian stages of the Cretaceous. Fossils of Macroscaphitidae were found all around the world although the abundance of found fossils is rather limited. Known fossils from collections were found largely in Europe (e.g. Italy, France, Czech Republic), South America (Mexico, Venezuela) and Africa (e.g. Mozambique). It is known for some species of which complete specimens were found that these animals developed a hetermorphic shell, i.e. the coiling of the shell was not regular, such that the first whirls formed a planispirally coiled evolute section as seen in homomorphic ammonites, but had an additional straight middle part and a presumably upwards facing aperture. Due to their odd morphology the taxonomic classification of Macroscaphitidae changed often over time since their discovery and may not be finally settled even now.

== Classification ==
The Macroscaphitidae comprise a family in the subclass of Ammonoidea in the class of Cephalopoda in the phylum Mollusca. Due to their curious morphology multiple attempts to classify them into a superfamily were made. While the Macroscaphitidae were at first assigned to Hamitaceae in the 1950s, this was revised in 2000 when they were classified as belonging to the superfamily Ancyloceratoidea. However, in 2007 it was proposed to assign Macroscaphitidae to the superfamily Ptychoceratiodea, where Macroscaphitidae still belong today.

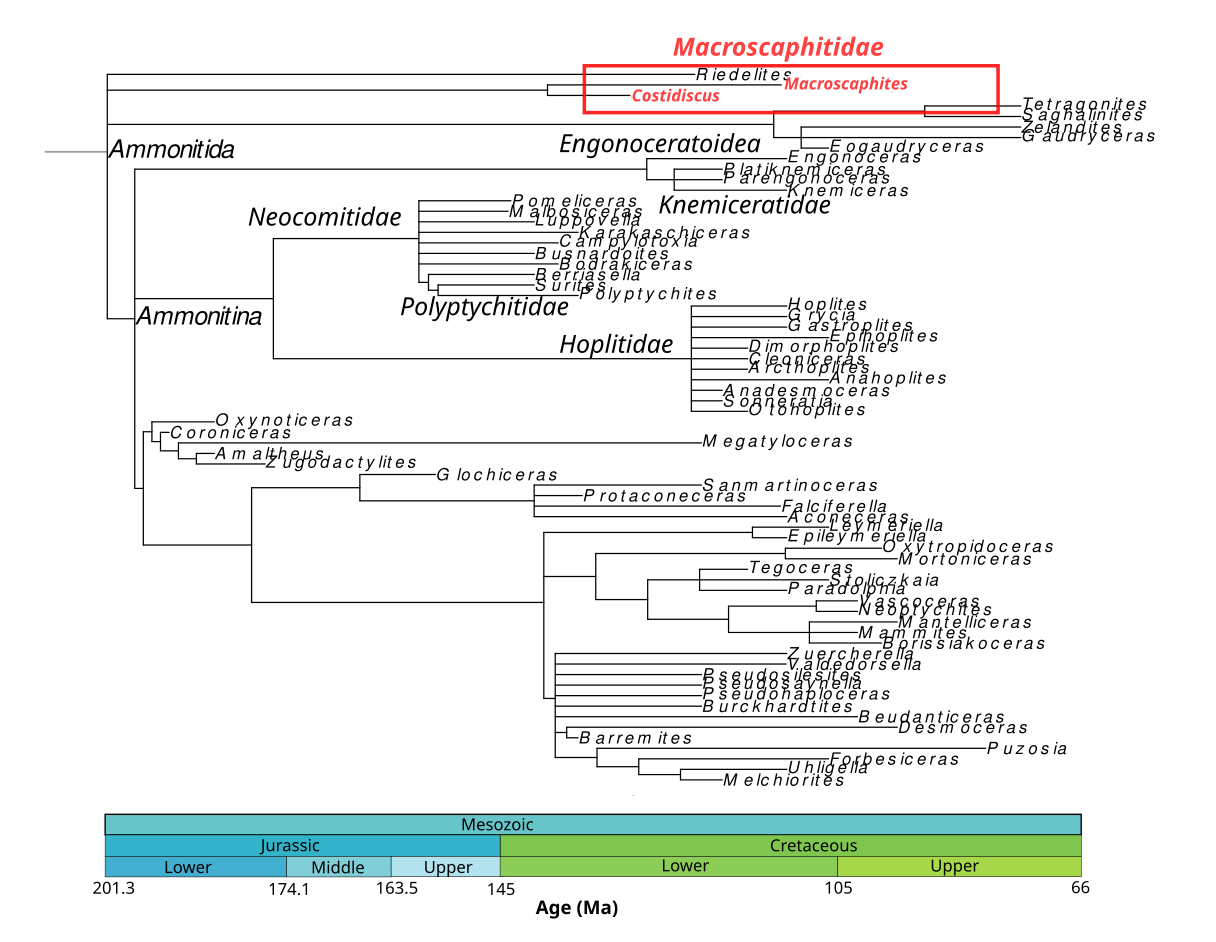
Phylogeny of Ammonitida with emphasis on Macroscaphitidae (own figure based on a dataset by Raia et al. (2015) and created with the R paleotree package)

=== Taxa ===
The family includes merely one genus (Macroscaphites Meek 1876) with two subgenera, the nominative (or type) genus Macroscaphites (Macroscaphites) Meek 1876 and the other subgenus Macroscaphites (Costidscus) Uhlig 1883. Some sources suggest more genera, such as Acantholytoceras Spath 1932, Ivaldiceras Delanoy 2010 or Rugacrioceras Vermeulen 2007, but the viability of such claims remains questionable. The type genus Macroscaphites (Macroscaphites) Meek 1876 contains four species, whereof Macroscaphites yuani Puzos 1831 constitutes the type species. The subgenus Macroscaphites (Costidiscus) Uhlig 1883 solely contains one species, Macroscaphites (Costidscus) reticostatus d’Orbigny 1840.

Fm. †Macroscaphitidae Hyatt 1900

G. †Macroscaphites Meek 1876

Subg. †Macroscaphites (Costidiscus) Uhlig 1883

†Macroscaphites (Costidiscus) recticostatus d'Orbigny 1840

Subg. †Macroscaphites (Macroscaphites) Meek 1876

†Macroscaphites perforatus Avram 1984
†Macroscaphites soaresi Da Silva 1962
†Macroscaphites striatisulcatus d'Orbigny 1841
†Macroscaphites yuani Puzos 1831

== Morphology ==
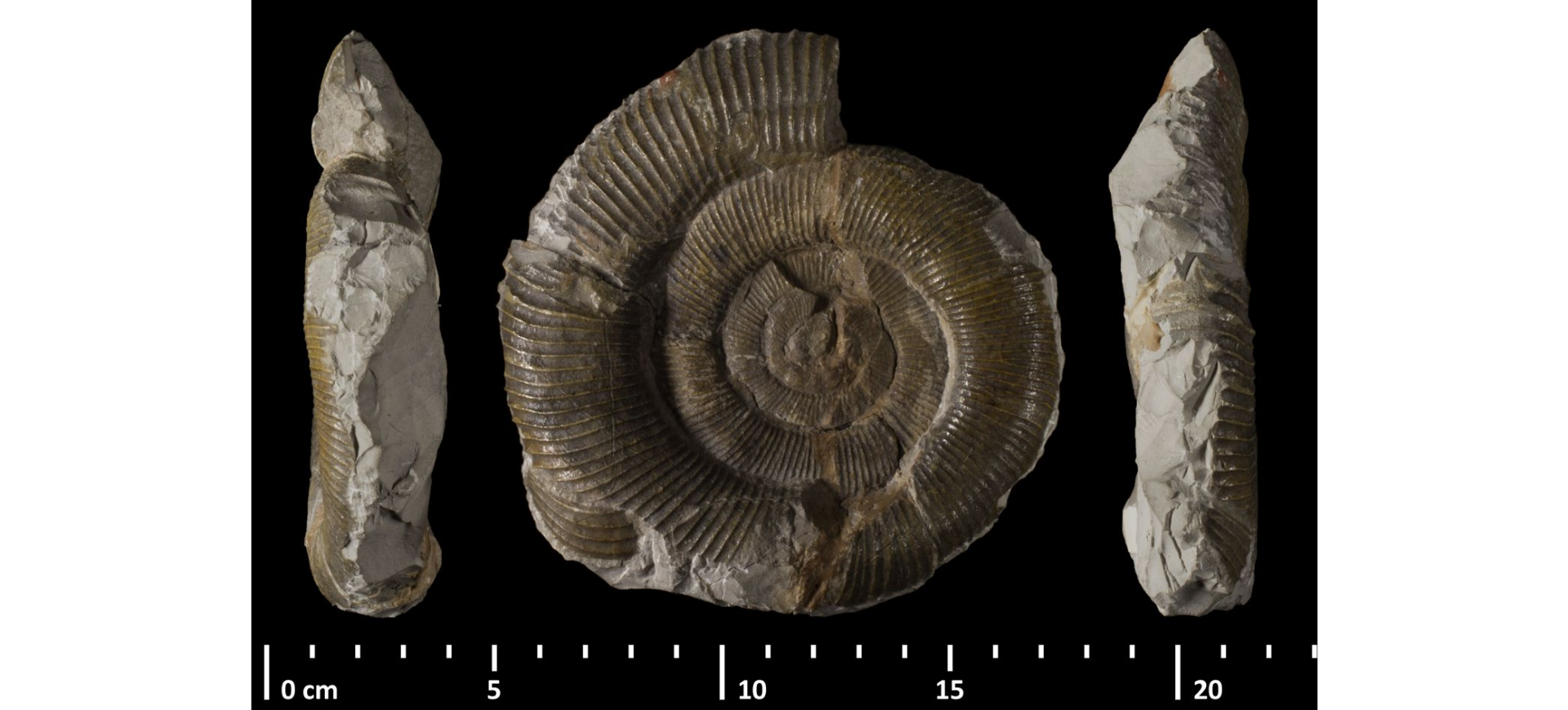
Costidiscus recticostatus (d'Orbigny, 1840)

Due to the scarce amount of fossils found of members of Macroscaphitidae, final remarks about their morphology are difficult to infer. Additionally, just few fossils have been preserved entirely. Nevertheless, a couple of specimens suggest that a wide range of sizes, up to tens of centimeters (e.g. Macroscaphites yuani, see picture at the top). However, some complete specimens infer that the shells of Macroscaphites can be more or less divided into three parts: the planispirally coiled phragmocone (as in homomorphic ammonites), a straight part of the living chamber and a hook with an almost 180 degree bend at the end where the aperture is located. Apart from that little is known about further morphological features.

== Life and ecology ==
It is likely that Macroscaphites lived similar to other, better known, heteromorphic ammonites. One assumption is that the whole living chamber was filled with the softbody to deduce the center of mass and buoyancy of the ammonite. This commonly used model suggests for hetermorphic ammonites that the center of mass lies vertically below the center of buoyancy (to keep the animal stable in the water column) and thus predicts that the aperture of Macroscaphites was probably facing upwards. In addition to that it has been proposed for other heteromorphic ammonites that there was a second stable position with the aperture tilted toward the sea floor to prey on bottom dwellers. However, this remains controversial for Macroscaphitidae since e.g. specimens of Macroscaphites yuani suggest an aperture facing towards the phragmocone, a so-called ancyclocone, and thus preventing it from being tilted towards the sea floor. Thus the exact feeding behavior of Macroscaphites remains unknown. While it is proposed that members of Macroscaphitidae were fast-moving nektonic carnivores due to there hydrodynamic anatomy, studies of other heteromorphic ammonites suggest a rather nektobenthonic lifestyle. Foraminifera, crustaceans and ostracods found in the guts of some species provide evidence that some heteromorphic ammonites fed on benthic animals, making a epifaunal lifestyle rather likely. Furthermore, all heteromorphic ammonite lack the hyponomic sinus e.g. found in recent Nautilius that is used for manoeuvreable jetting, thus making a comparable lifestyle to Nautilus unlikely. In addition most fossil remnants of heteromorphic ammonites, including those of the Macroscaphitidae, were found in clay or marl rather than sandy facies suggesting a substrate dependend lifestyle. It was thus concluded that probably most heteromorphic ammonites, including Macroscaphitidae were bottom dwelling, like a small octopus with a mobile burrow.

== Fossils and distribution ==
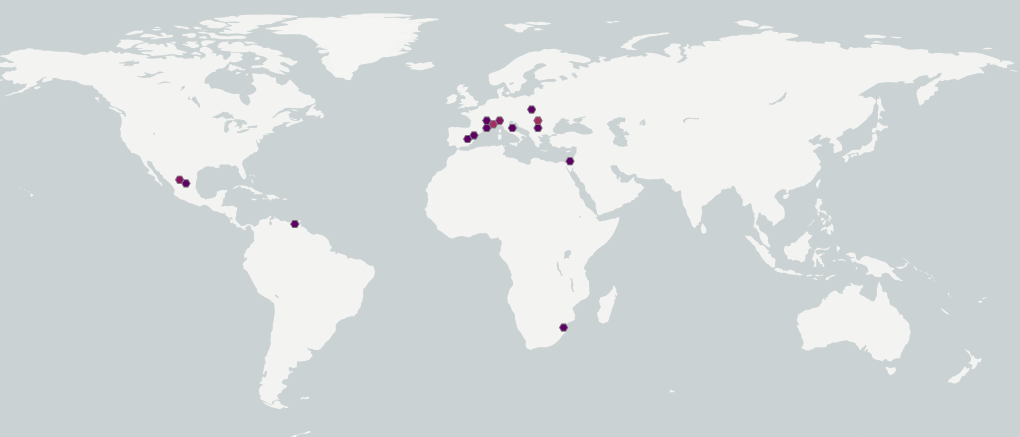
Fossil distribution of Macroscaphitidae

Compared to other ammonoid families just very few fossil specimens of Macroscaphitidae are known from collections. While some specimens are well preserved and provide information about the morphology and potentially about the way of living of Macroscaphites, others are merely partly preserved making a comprehensive analysis of the morphology difficult. Fossils of members of Macroscaphitidae have been found in Europe (France, Italy, Serbia, Bulgaria, the Czech Republic, Spain, Georgia), Africa (Egypt, South Africa and Mozambique) and South America (Mexico and Venezuela). The fossils have been found in the form of casts, molds, impressions and replacement and occurred mainly in limestone

== See also ==
- Ammonoidea
- Ancyloceratoidea
