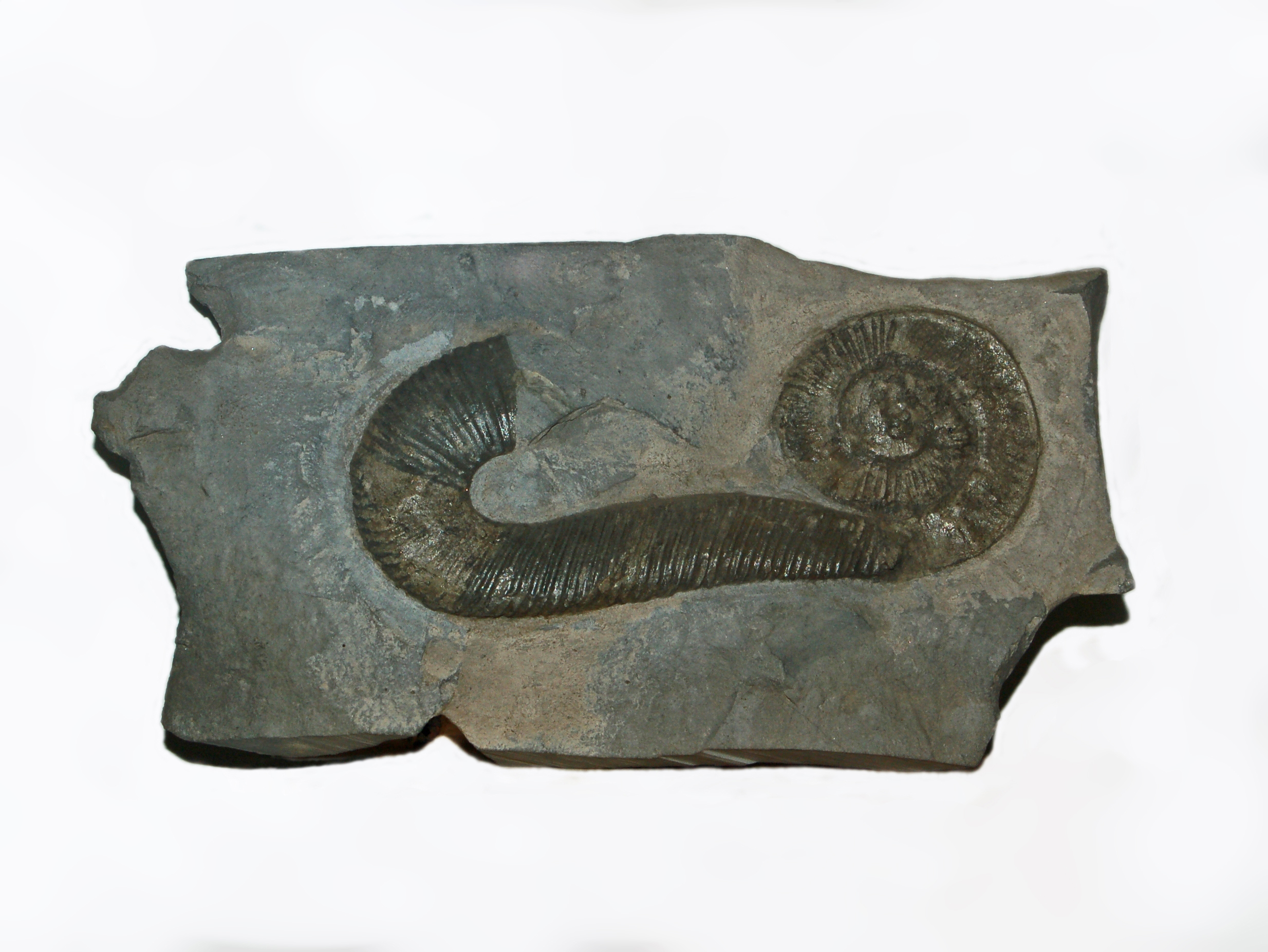
- Macroscaphites yvani

Scientific classification
- Kingdom: Animalia
- Phylum: Mollusca
- Class: Cephalopoda
- Subclass: †Ammonoidea
- Order: †Ammonitida
- Family: †Lytoceratidae
- Genus: †Macroscaphites; Meek, 1876

Species
- M. (Costidiscus); M. (Macroscaphites); M. striatisulcatus; M. juani

= Macroscaphites =

Macroscaphites Temporal range: Barremian-Turonian ~130–90 Ma

Extinct genus of molluscs

Macroscaphites is an extinct cephalopod genus included in the Ammonoidea that lived during the Barremian and Aptian stages of the Early Cretaceous (118 - 110 million years ago). Its fossils have been found throughout most of Europe and North Africa.

Macroscaphites is known to have reached a length of about 20–30 centimetres (7.9–11.8 in). The shell is in two basic parts, an early planispirally coiled evolute section followed by a more or less straight section that turns back on itself in a hook.

On the basis of studies conducted on the shape of the shell (which take into account the specific weight of the live animal and respective position of the centers of gravity and buoyancy) paleontologists have concluded that this animal lived with the aperture directed toward the surface of the water; the coiled portion upward and the U-shaped-hook directed towards the ocean floor.

== List of species ==
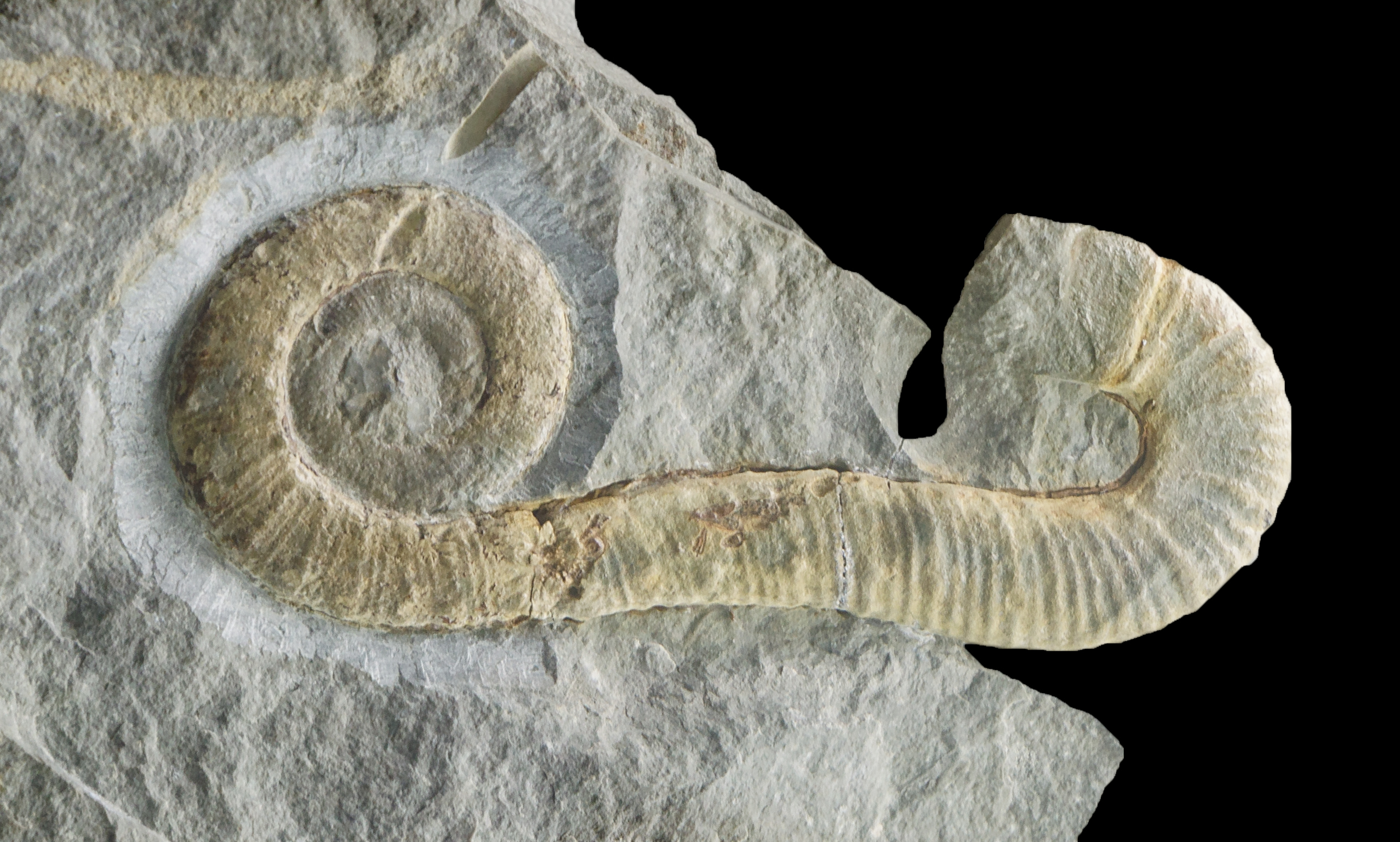
Macroscaphites tirolensis

- Macroscaphites juani (Puzos 1832); Cuba
- Macroscaphites soaresi (Da Silva 1962); Mozambique
- Macroscaphites striasulcatus (Meek 1876)
- Macroscaphites tirolensis (Uhlig, 1887); South Tyrol, Italy

=== Fossil locations ===
Fossils of Macroscaphites have been found in:

Eurasia

- Bulgaria
- Luckovska Formation, the Czech Republic
- France
- Georgia
- Italy
- Serbia and Montenegro
- Forcall Formation, Spain

Laurentia

- Mexico

Africa

- Egypt
- Mozambique
- Makatini Formation, South Africa

South America

- García Formation, Venezuela
