= Ancyloceratoidea =

Ancyloceratoidea Temporal range: Cretaceous

Scientific classification
- Kingdom: Animalia
- Phylum: Mollusca
- Class: Cephalopoda
- Subclass: †Ammonoidea
- Order: †Ammonitida
- Suborder: †Ancyloceratina
- Superfamily: †Ancyloceratoidea; Hyatt, 1900

Families
- Acrioceratidae; Ancyloceratidae; Bochianitidae; Crioceratitidae; Hamulinidae; Hemihoplitidae; Heteroceratidae; Himantoceratidae; Labeceratidae; Leptoceratoididae; Macroscaphitidae; Ptychoceratidae

Extinct superfamily of molluscs

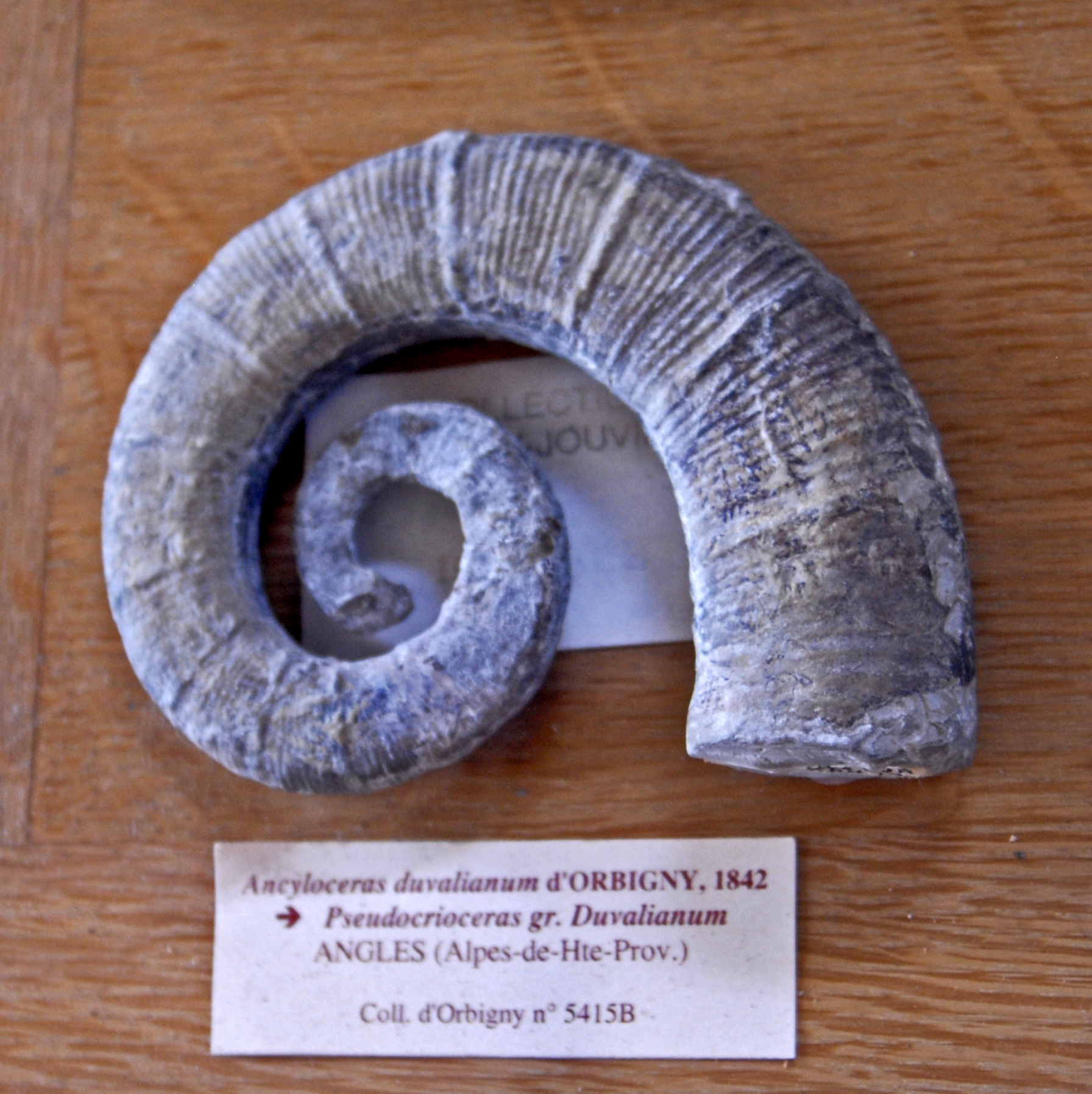
Fossil of Pseudocrioceras duvalianum

Ancyloceratoidea, formerly Ancylocerataceae, is a superfamily of typically uncoiled and loosely coiled heteromorph ammonoids established by Alpheus Hyatt in 1900, that may contain as many as 11 families, depending on the classification accepted.

== Taxonomy ==
The taxonomy content, or families, of the Ancycloceratoidea has grown over the year, partly with the addition of newly defined families and partly with the moving of families from other superfamilies.

Arkell, et al. (1957) in the Treatise Part L included just the Ancyloceratidae Meek 1876, Bochianitidae Spath 1922, Hemihoplitidae Spath 1924, and Heteroceratidae Hyatt 1900 within the Ancylocerataceae. The Crioceratitidae Wright 1952 was considered a subfamily, the Crioceratitinae, within the Ancycloceratidae, the other being the Ancyloceratinae.

Families recognized in the Treatise and subsequently removed to the Ancycloceratoidea from other taxa include the Ptychoceratidae Meek 1876, Macroscaphitidae Hyatt 1900, and Labeceratidae Spath 1925. Those established since include the Acrioceratidae Vermeulen 2004, Himantoceratidae Dimitrova 1970, Leptoceratoididae Thieuloy 1966.

The Treatise on Invertebrate Paleontology, Part L, placed the Ancylocerataceae in the suborder Lytoceratina along with the Lytocerataceae, Turrilitaceae, and Scaphitaceae, with superfamily endings as then used.

The Ancyloceratoidea is now generally accepted as being within the separate suborder from the Ammonitida, the Ancyloceratina established by Wiedmann in 1966.

== Phylogeny ==
There are two main competing theories regarding the origin of the Ancyloceratoidea, and Ancyloceratina (unless polyphyletic). The first derives the Ancycloceratoidea, and by inference the Ancyloceratina, from the Lytoceratina late in the Jurassic through the ancestral Bochianitidae. The other derives the Ancyloceratina, including the Ancyloceratoidea, from the Ammonitida during the Early Cretaceous.

== Renaming ==
Ancyloceratoidea was renamed from Ancylocerataceae in accordance with the ICZN which gives invertebrate superfamilies the name suffix which was formerly used for subclasses.
