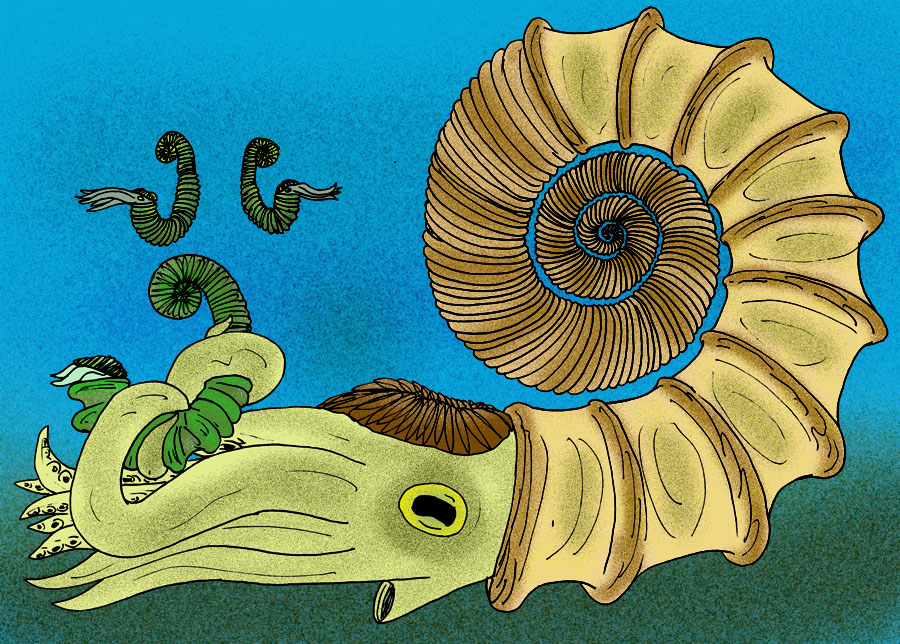
- Tropaeum imperator

Scientific classification
- Kingdom: Animalia
- Phylum: Mollusca
- Class: Cephalopoda
- Subclass: †Ammonoidea
- Order: †Ammonitida
- Suborder: †Ancyloceratina
- Family: †Ancyloceratidae
- Genus: †Tropaeum; Sowerby, 1837

Species
- T. imperator; T. undatum; T. bowerbanki; T. rasgradensis; T. australis; T. loegteri

= Tropaeum =

Tropaeum Temporal range: Early Cretaceous

Genus of molluscs (fossil)

Tropaeum is an extinct genus of ammonites found throughout the oceans of the world during the Early Cretaceous. As with many other members of the family Ancyloceratidae, there was a trend among species within this genus to uncoil somewhat, in a very similar manner to the genus Lytoceras. The largest species, T. imperator of Australia, had a shell a little over one meter in diameter.

The name "Tropaeum" was applied by paleontologist James De Carle Sowerby, in 1837.
