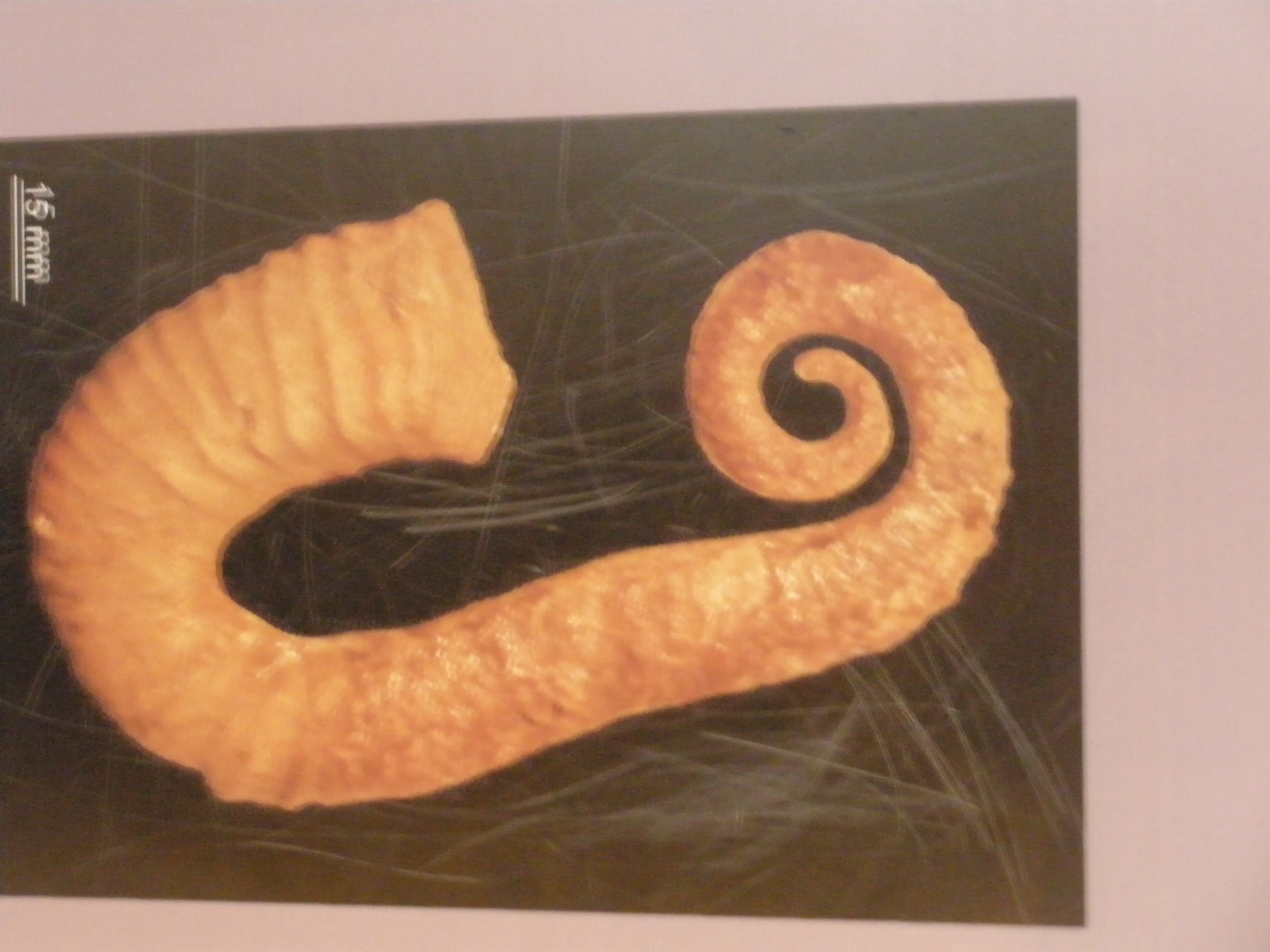

Scientific classification
- Domain: Eukaryota
- Kingdom: Animalia
- Phylum: Mollusca
- Class: Cephalopoda
- Subclass: †Ammonoidea
- Order: †Ammonitida
- Suborder: †Ancyloceratina
- Family: †Ancyloceratidae
- Genus: †Ancyloceras d'Orbigny, 1842

Species
- See text

= Ancyloceras =

Ancyloceras Temporal range: Lower Barremian to Lower Aptian

Genus of molluscs (fossil)

Ancyloceras is an extinct genus of heteromorph ammonites found throughout the world during the Lower Cretaceous, from the Lower Barremian epoch until the genus extinction during the Lower Aptian.

== Selected species ==
- Ancyloceras audouli Astier, 1851
- Ancyloceras fallauxi Uhlig, 1883
- Ancyloceras mantelli Casey, 1960
- Ancyloceras matheronianum d'Orbigny, 1842
- Ancyloceras vandenheckii Astier, 1851

== Description ==
Ancyloceras ammonites have a shell reaching a length of about 10 centimetres (3.9 in) and a width of about 7 centimetres (2.8 in). They are known as heteromorph shaped, with a partly uncoiled shell and the aperture directed toward the coiled part.

Most ammonites are homomorph, as they maintain the same shape throughout the growth, while the ammonites in this genus have uncoiled shells (heteromorph or different-shaped ammonites), that would have precluded fast swimming.

== Distribution ==
Fossils of Ancyloceras species are found in the Cretaceous Barremian Stage (117-113 million year old) marine strata of Europe, Colombia and Morocco.
