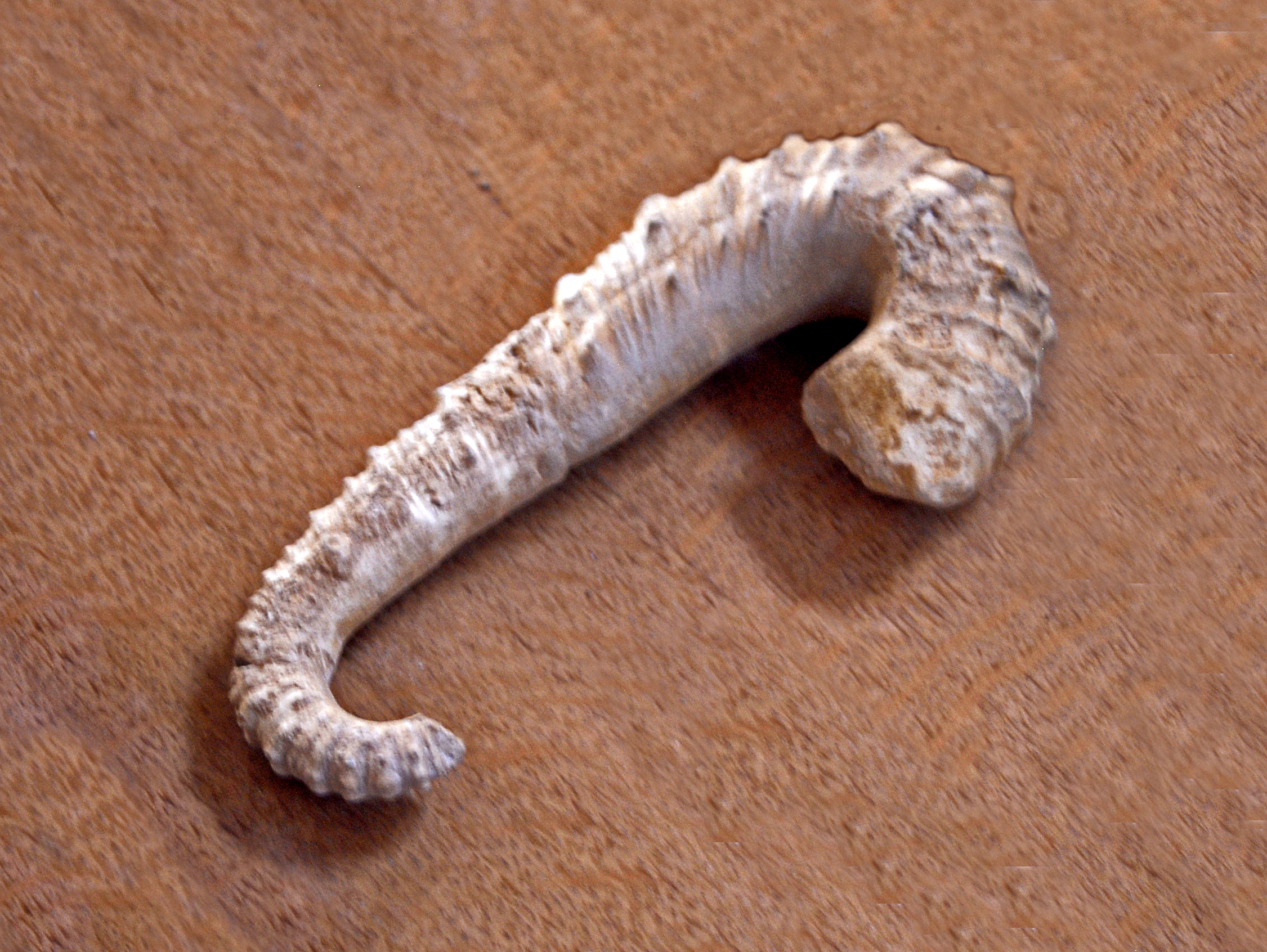
- Fossil of Ancyloceras from the lower Aptian of the Paris Basin (France), on display at Galerie de paléontologie et d'anatomie comparée in Paris

Scientific classification
- Domain: Eukaryota
- Kingdom: Animalia
- Phylum: Mollusca
- Class: Cephalopoda
- Subclass: †Ammonoidea
- Order: †Ammonitida
- Suborder: †Ancyloceratina
- Superfamily: †Ancyloceratoidea
- Family: †Ancyloceratidae; Meek, 1876

Genera
- See text

= Ancyloceratidae =

Ancyloceratidae Temporal range: Lower Cretaceous

Extinct family of ammonites

Ancyloceratidae is a family of heteromorphic ammonites that lived during the Early Cretaceous. Their shells begin as a loose spiral with whorls not touching which then turns into a straight shaft that ends in a J-shape hook or bend at end. Coarse ribbing and spines are common.

Ancyloceratidae is the type family for the Ancyloceratoidea and of the suborder Ancyloceratina. They are found in Lower Cretaceous, Barremian to perhaps Lower Albian sediments.

Genera include:

- Ammonitoceras Dumas, 1876
- Ancyloceras D'Orbigny, 1842 - type genus
- Ancylotropaeum Casey, 1980
- Antarcticoceras Thomson, 1974
- Audouliceras Thomel, 1965
- Australiceras Whitehouse, 1926
- Caspianites Casey, 1961
- Epancyloceras Spath, 1930
- Epitroapeum Kakabadze, 1977
- Helicancyloceras Klinger & Kennedy, 1977
- Hoheneggericeras Delanoy et al. 2008
- Jaubertites Sarkar, 1955
- Kutatissites Kakabadze, 1970
- Koeneniceras Mikhailova & Baraboshkin, 2002
- Laqueoceras Kakabadze & Hoedemaeker, 2004
- Lithancylus Casey, 1960
- Luppovia Bogdanova et al. 1978
- Proaustraliceras Kakabadze, 1977
- Pseudoancyloceras Stenshin et al., 2014
- Pseudoaustraliceras Kakabadze, 1981
- Pseudocrioceras Spath, 1924
- Sarkariceras Vermeulen, 2006
- Shastoceras Anderson, 1938
- Toxancyloceras Delanoy, 2003
- Tropaeum J. de C. Sowerby, 1837

Ancyloceratidae are derived from the Crioceratidae, a family of Lower Cretaceous ammonites with loosely wound, open planispiral shells, probably originating from within the suborder Lytoceratina.
