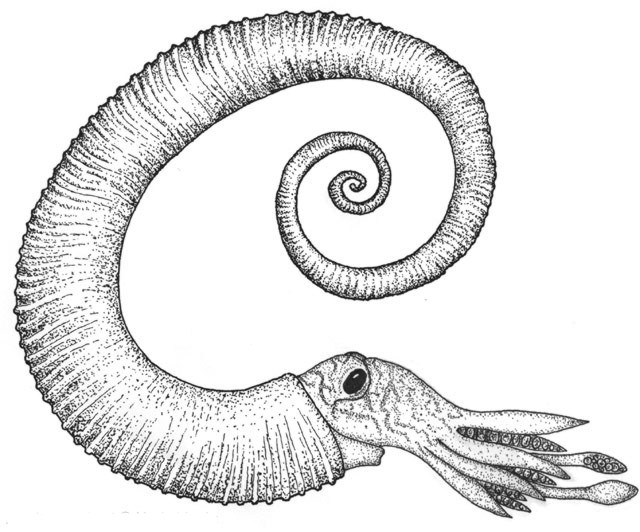
- A reconstruction of a heteromorph ammonite, Hamites sp.

Scientific classification
- Kingdom: Animalia
- Phylum: Mollusca
- Class: Cephalopoda
- Subclass: †Ammonoidea
- Order: †Ammonitida
- Suborder: †Ancyloceratina; Wiedmann, 1966

Superfamilies
- Ancyloceratoidea; Douvilleiceratoidea; Turrilitoidea; Deshayesitoidea; Scaphitoidea

= Ancyloceratina =

Ancyloceratina Temporal range: 199.6–64.8 Ma Jurassic - Paleocene

Extinct suborder of ammonites

The Ancyloceratina were a diverse suborder of ammonite most closely related to the ammonites of order Lytoceratina. They evolved during the Late Jurassic but were not very common until the Cretaceous period, when they rapidly diversified and became one of the most distinctive components of Cretaceous marine faunas. They have been recorded from every continent and many are used as zonal or index fossils. The most distinctive feature of the majority of the Ancyloceratina is the tendency for most of them to have shells that are not regular spirals like most other ammonites. These irregularly-coiled ammonites are called heteromorph ammonites, in contrast to regularly coiled ammonites, which are called homomorph ammonites.

== Biology ==
The biology of the heteromorph ammonites is not clear, but one certainty is that their uncoiled shells would have made these forms very poor swimmers. Open shells, particularly ones with spines and ribs, create a lot of drag; but more importantly, the orientation of the shell, with the body hanging below the buoyant part of the shell, would have created a serious impediment to efficient swimming. It's more likely these ammonites either drifted in the plankton, collecting small animals on long tentacles like modern jellyfish, or else they crawled along the sea floor feeding on sessile or slow-moving animals such as clams.

== Morphology ==
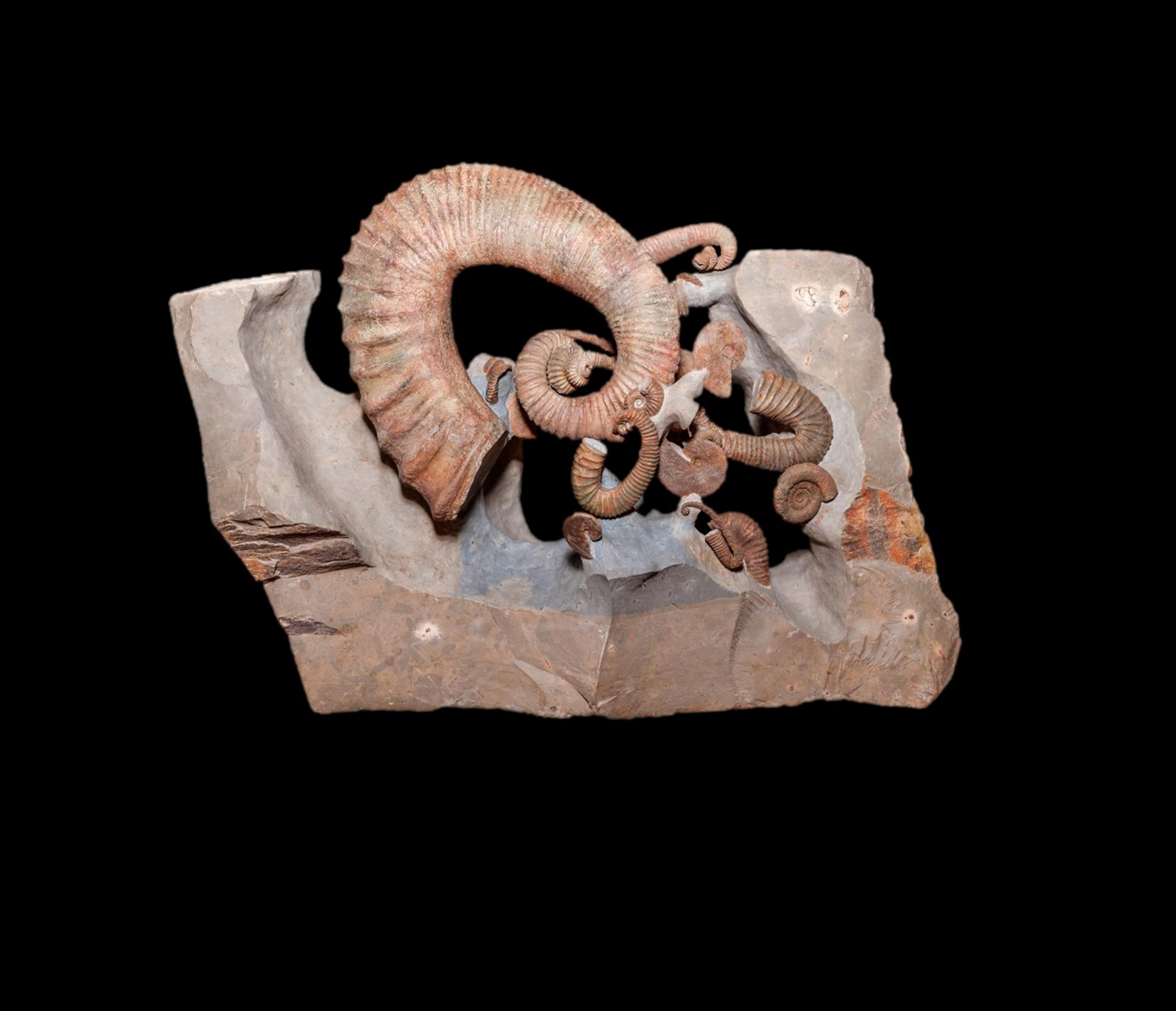
Assemblage of Barremian heteromorph ammonites from southeastern France

Ancyloceratida varied widely in size, ranging from diminutive Ptychoceras, which was barely 3 cm (1.2 in) long, to Baculites and Diplomoceras, which could grow to 1–2 m (3.3–6.6 ft) in length. Some species were very widely distributed, for example some species of Hamites can be found in Eurasia, South America, Australia, and Antarctica. Others, like those inhabiting the Western Interior Seaway that covered much of the US, were much more localized.

In the more primitive forms, the shell departs only slightly from being a perfect spiral, with only the last, outermost whorl being open, forming a hook underneath the main spiral. In such forms the spiral was the chambered, buoyant part of the shell, and the hook was the living chamber in which the soft body of the ammonite resided. Examples of such types were Ancyloceras, Protanisoceras, and Tropaeum. The more advanced heteromorphs departed from such forms radically. The shells of Ptychoceras consisted of three or four shafts squashed together and connected with tight, 180 degree bends. Members of the genus Hamites were much larger but had a similar sort of shape, though the shafts were open so that the whole thing looked rather like a big paper clip.

Many of the earlier heteromorph forms had regularly coiled shells barely distinguishable from the homomorph ammonites (for example, the Lower Cretaceous genus Deshayesites). Some offshoots of the uncoiled varieties even went back to being regularly coiled. Most notable among these were the Scaphites, Hoploscaphites and their relatives, which were mostly regular spirals in shape except for a very slight hook at the end.

The Late Cretaceous enjoyed the widest variety of heteromorphs, including the straight-shelled Baculites and Sciponoceras; the helically coiled Turrilites; and the bizarre Nipponites, which looked more like a ball of string than anything else. Some forms combined different coiling modes. For example, Nostoceras started off with a helix like a Turrilites, but had a planar hook hanging underneath, more like an Ancyloceras.

The thin shelled heteromorphic ammonites probably lived at depths 36–183 m (118.1–600.4 ft).

== Classification ==
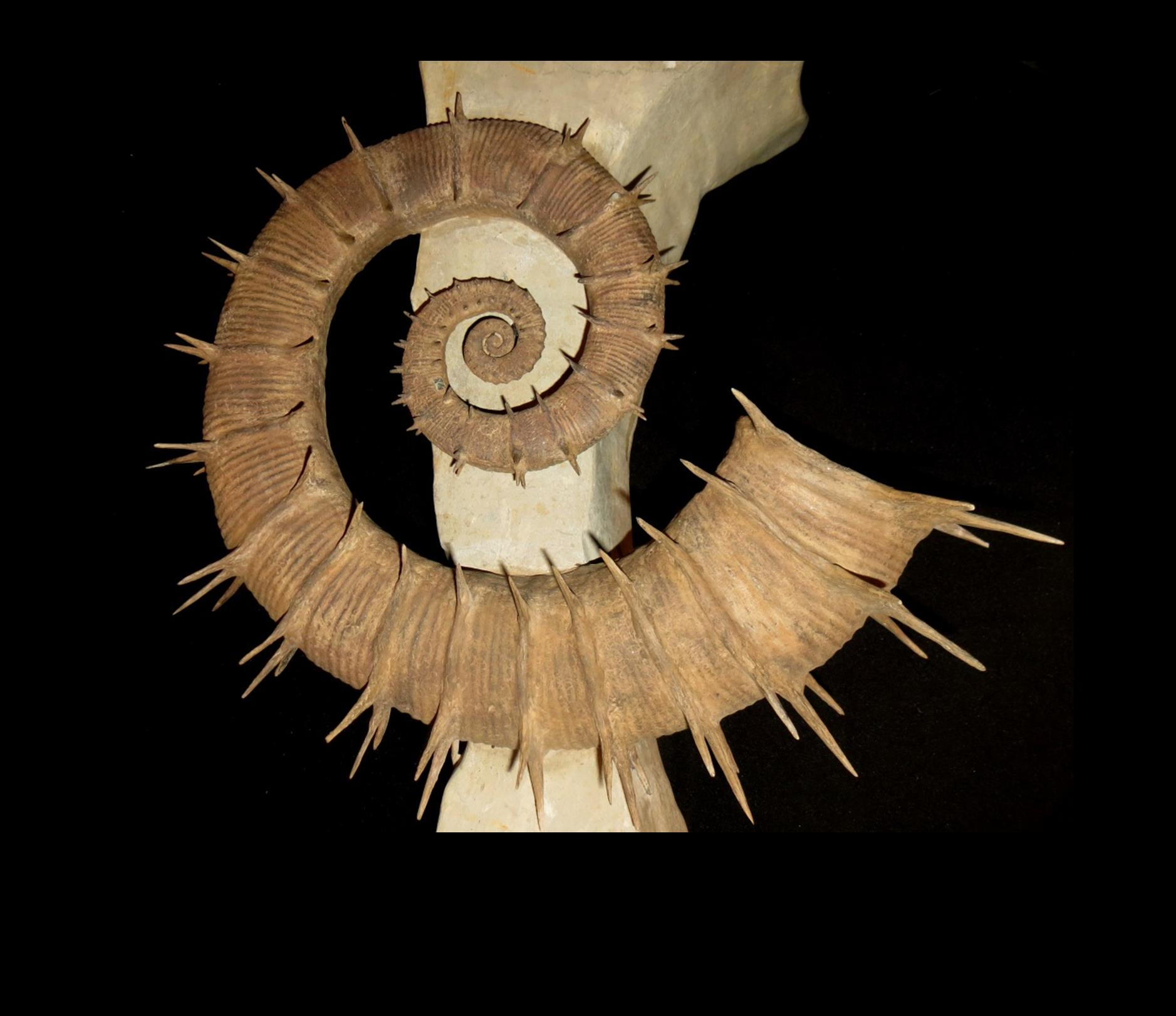
Crioceratites nolani with spines partially restored

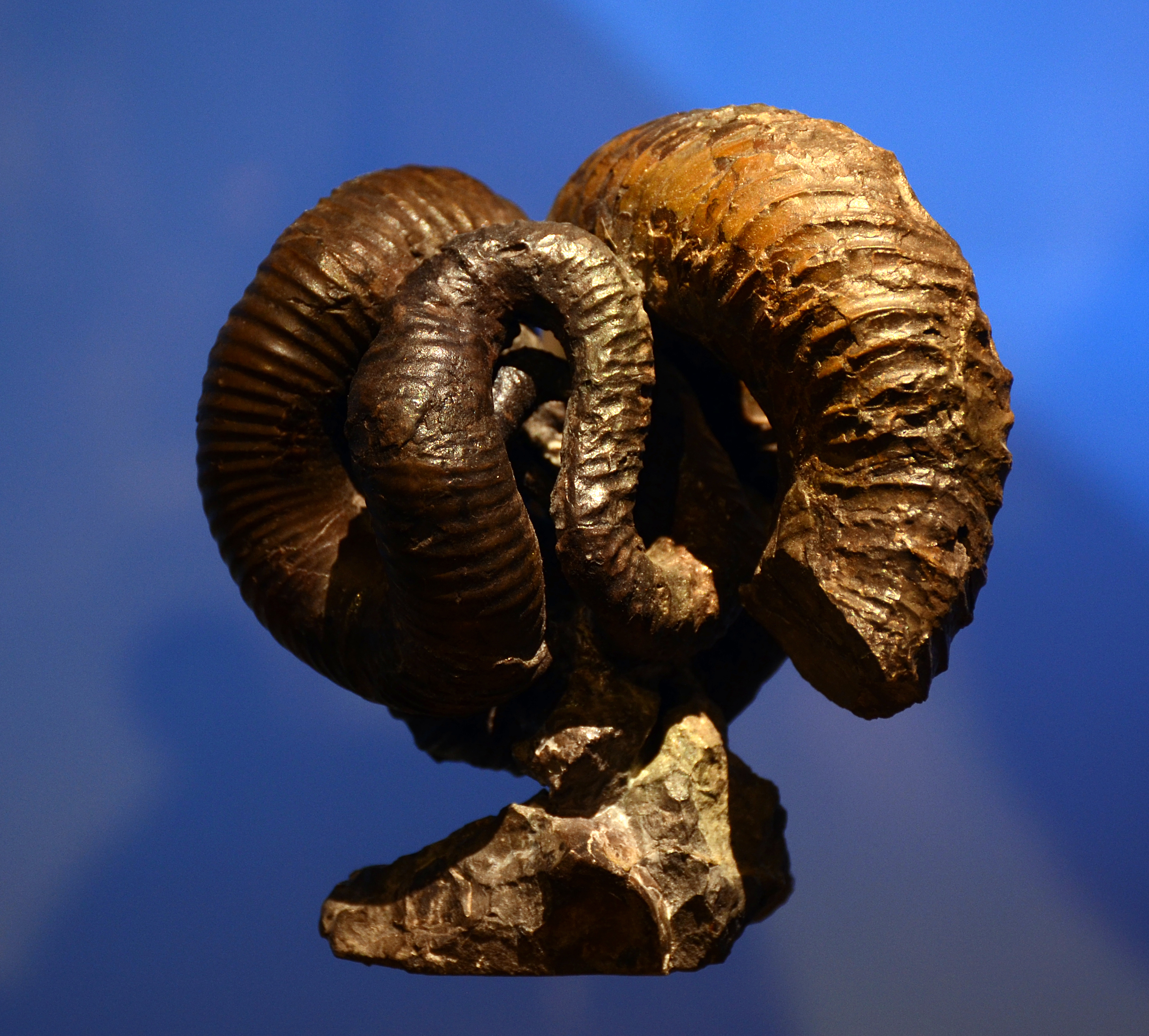
Nipponites mirabilis

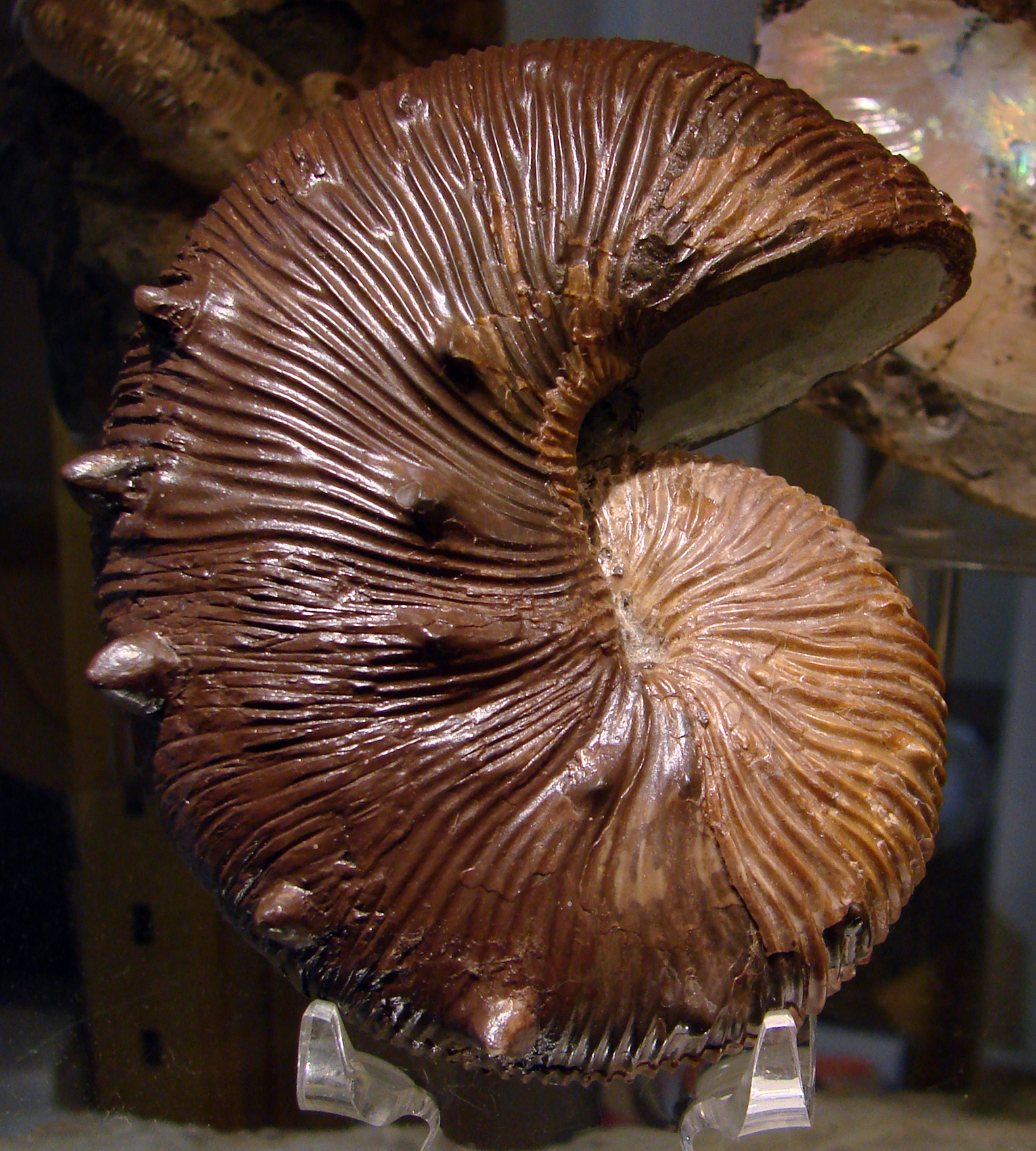
Scaphites sp.

Suborder Ancyloceratina

- Superfamily Ancyloceratoidea
  - Family Acrioceratidae
  - Family Ancyloceratidae
  - Family Bochianitidae
  - Family Crioceratitidae
  - Family Hamulinidae
  - Family Hemihoplitidae
  - Family Heteroceratidae
  - Family Himantoceratidae
  - Family Labeceratidae
  - Family Macroscaphitidae
  - Family Ptychoceratidae
- Superfamily Deshayesitoidea
  - Family Deshayesitidae
  - Family Parahoplitidae
- Superfamily Douvilleiceratoidea
  - Family Astiericeratidae
  - Family Douvilleiceratidae
  - Family Trochleiceratidae
- Superfamily Scaphitoidea
  - Family Scaphitidae
- Superfamily Turrilitoidea
  - Family Anisoceratidae
  - Family Baculitidae
  - Family Diplomoceratidae
  - Family Hamitidae
  - Family Nostoceratidae
  - Family Turrilitidae
