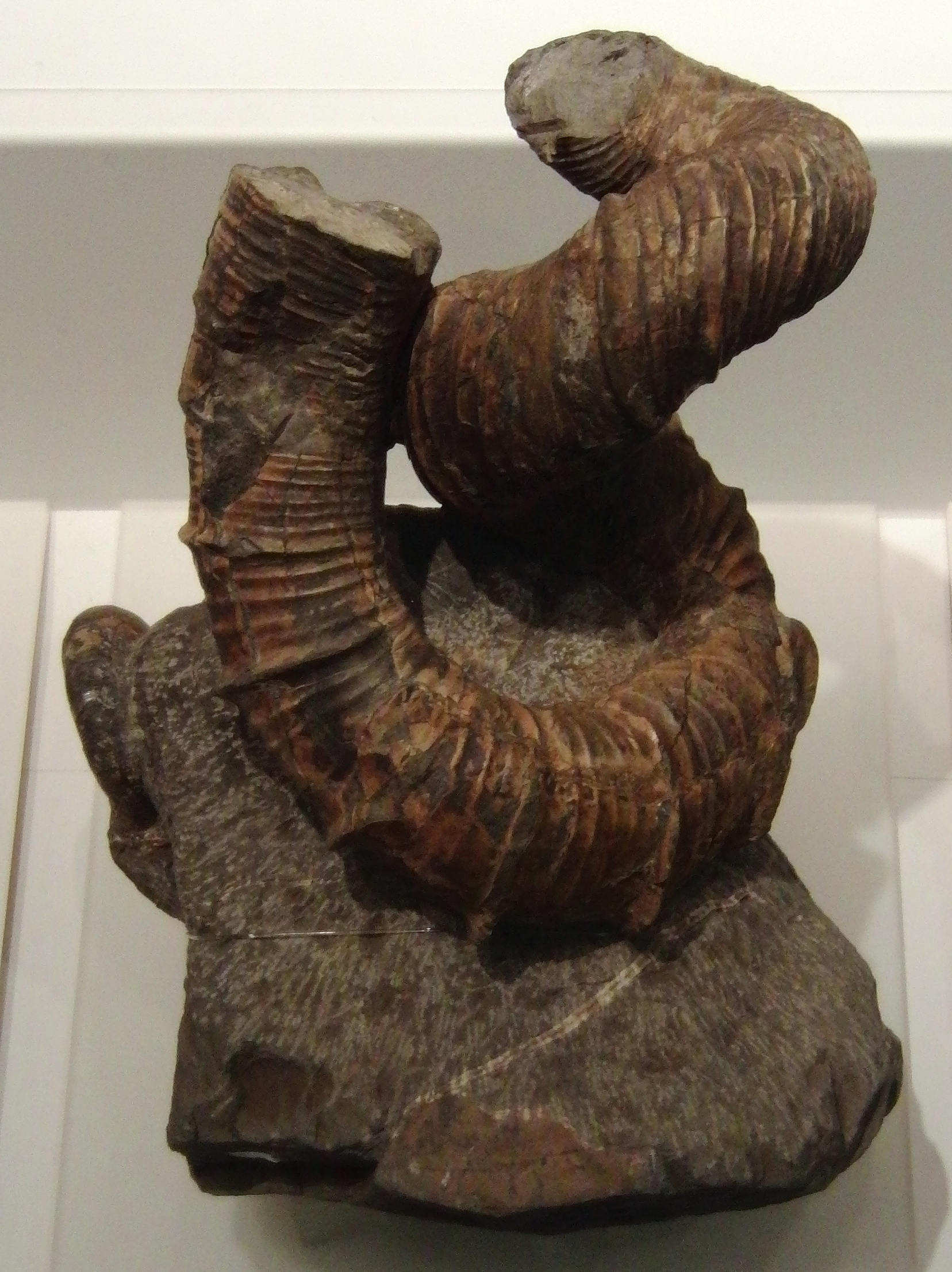
- Fossil of Eubostrychoceras japonicum from Japan. Late Cretaceous. Exhibit in the National Museum of Nature and Science, Tokyo, Japan.

Scientific classification
- Kingdom: Animalia
- Phylum: Mollusca
- Class: Cephalopoda
- Subclass: †Ammonoidea
- Order: †Ammonitida
- Suborder: †Ancyloceratina
- Family: †Nostoceratidae
- Genus: †Eubostrychoceras; Matsumoto, 1967

Species
- E. acuticostatum d'Orbigny ,1842; E. indopacificum Matsumoto, 1967; E. japonicum Yabe, 1904; E. matsumotoi Cobban, 1987; E. valdelaxum Aiba et al., 2017; E. perplexum Aiba, 2025

Synonyms
- Didymoceras (Eubostrychoceras); Nostoceras (Eubostrychoceras)

= Eubostrychoceras =

Eubostrychoceras Temporal range: 91.9–72.1 Ma Turonian-Campanian

Genus of molluscs (fossil)

Eubostrychoceras is a genus of helically wound, corkscrew form, heteromorph ammonite which lived during the Upper Cretaceous (M Turonian - Campanian). The genus is included in the ancycleratid family Nostoceratidae.

The shell of Eubostrychoceras is a loosely to tightly wound spiral forming a corkscrew with an open, empty umbilicus in the middle. Coiling is commonly dextral (right hand). Coils are covered by moderately strong, straight transverse ribs. The aperture, or apertural end, reverses general direction and points upwards or back towards to apex. Sutures are moderately complex. The siphuncle is located mid flank.

Eubostrychoceras has a widespread distribution in the Upper Createous and has been found in Antarctica, Japan,Spain, the far east of Russia, Alaska, Vancouver Island, U.S. Western Interior Seaway, Germany, and Madagascar. In 2001 it was reported from Alaska's Matanuska Formation as well. E. japonicum is Turonian, and likely confined to the middle Turonian. Based on the similarity of textures and the curl of the shell as well as the stratigraphic relationships, E. valdelaxum from Japan is likely evolved from E. japonicum.

Related genera include Anaklinoceras, Bostrychoceras, Didymoceras, and Nostoceras.
