= Santa Marta Formation =

Geologic formation in Antarctica

- Stratigraphic range: Santonian-Campanian
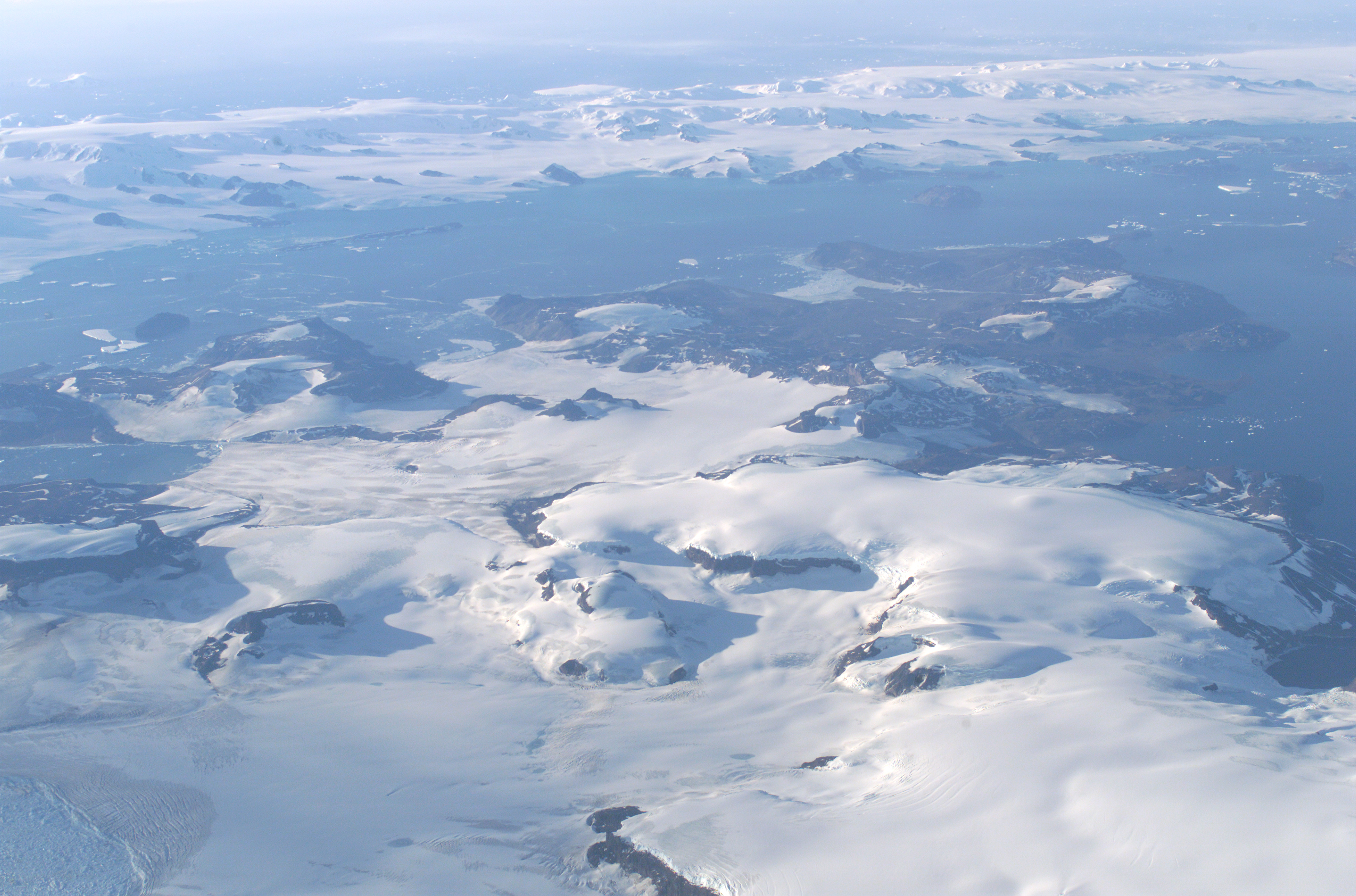
- Type: Geological formation
- Unit of: Marambio Group
- Sub-units: Alpha Member, Beta Member
- Underlies: Snow Hill Island Formation
- Overlies: Hidden Lake Formation
- Thickness: 1,000 m (3,300 ft)

Lithology
- Primary: Mudstone, sandstone
- Other: Siltstone, tuff

Location
- Coordinates: 63.0°S 57.0°W
- Approximate paleocoordinates: 60.9°S 67.6°W
- Region: James Ross Island
- Country: Argentine Antarctica, British Antarctic Territory, Chilean Antarctic Territory
- Santa Marta Formation (Antarctica)

The Santa Marta Formation is a geologic formation in Antarctica. It, along with the Hanson Formation and the Snow Hill Island Formation, are the only formations yet known on the continent where dinosaur fossils have been found. The formation outcrops on James Ross Island off the coast of the northern tip of the Antarctic Peninsula. In its entirety, the Santa Marta Formation is on average one kilometer thick.

== Stratigraphy ==
The Santa Marta Formation was deposited during the Santonian and Campanian ages of the Late Cretaceous. It overlies the Gustav Group laid down during the Barremian and Santonian ages and is succeeded by the Snow Hill Island Formation of late Campanian age. Together, the Santa Marta Formation, Snow Hill Island Formation, the overlying López de Bertodano Formation (deposited from the late Campanian age of the Late Cretaceous to the early Paleocene epoch of the early Paleogene), and the Sobral Formation (deposited during the early Paleocene) form the Marambio Group.

Originally, the formation was subdivided into three informal members termed the Alpha, Beta, and Gamma members. The names were later changed to the Lachman Crags, Herbert Sound, and Rabot members. The Lachman Crags and Herbert Sound members, named after the areas in which they outcrop, are found in the northern part of James Ross Island. Both members are late Campanian in age. The Lachman Crags Member, the older of the two, is around 500 meters thick. The lower section of the member consists of tuffaceous mudstone while the upper section consists of tuffaceous turbidites formed by underwater avalanches. Bioturbation is evident in tuff beds throughout the member due to the disruption of sediments by benthic life during the time of deposition. The Herbert Sound member is also around 500 meters thick and also can be divided into two distinct sections. Channeled debris flows interbedded with turbides make up the lower portion of the member and are overlain by fine sandstones (followed by coarser sandstones and coquinas) that make up the upper portion of the member.

The depositional environment is thought to have been a system of abyssal fans radiating out from a large river delta. The rapid aggradation of sediments from the delta produced a steep delta slope, which may have resulted in occasional debris flows that formed the turbides. A high degree of tectonic activity in the region at the time may explain the intermittent tuff beds throughout the formation.

The Rabot Member of the Santa Marta Formation is confined to the southeastern part of James Ross Island and dates back to the early to late Campanian. Outcroppings of the member are separated from those of other members in the northern part of the island. Originally the member was regarded as its own formation, and now it is considered to be the lateral equivalent of both the Lachman Crags and Herbert Sound members. Like the Lachman Crags and Herbert Sound members, the Rabot member consists of mudstones and beds of tuff that are often highly bioturbated, and also consists of rare conglomerates. Recently a fourth member has been assigned to the formation called the Hamilton Point Member. The beds of this member used to be considered part of the upper portion of the Rabot member, but now are considered to be their own distinct member.

== Flora and fauna ==
A wide variety of microorganisms inhabited the coastal waters at the time of the deposition of the Santa Marta Formation. Microfossils include ostracods and dinoflagellates.

Invertebrates were also common. Fossils of ammonites can be found in the formation, often embedded vertically in the bedding plane. Originally it was thought that dead ammonites could only be oriented this way in sediment if they were in shallow waters below a certain pressure, but there is evidence to support that due to specific conditions during burial, it was possible for these ammonites to be vertically oriented at greater depths. Ammonite genera present in the formation include Anagaudryceras, Anapachydiscus, Eupachydiscus, Gaudryceras, Maorites, Natalites, Parasolenoceras, Yezoites, and the heteromorph ammonites Ainoceras, Eubostrychoceras, Ryugasella and Baculites. Many bivalve fossils have been found such as Cucullaea, Panopea, Pinna, and Pterotrigonia. Polychaete annelid worms such as Rotularia and gastropods such as the cerithiid sea snail Cerithium have also been discovered in beds within the formation.

Numerous ichnofossils provide evidence of benthic activity, along with previously mentioned bioturbated sediments. Vertical spreite trace fossils have been found as part of fodinichnia dominated ichnocoenosis and were assigned to ichnogenre such as Paradictyodora. Trackways thought to belong to decapods have also been found.

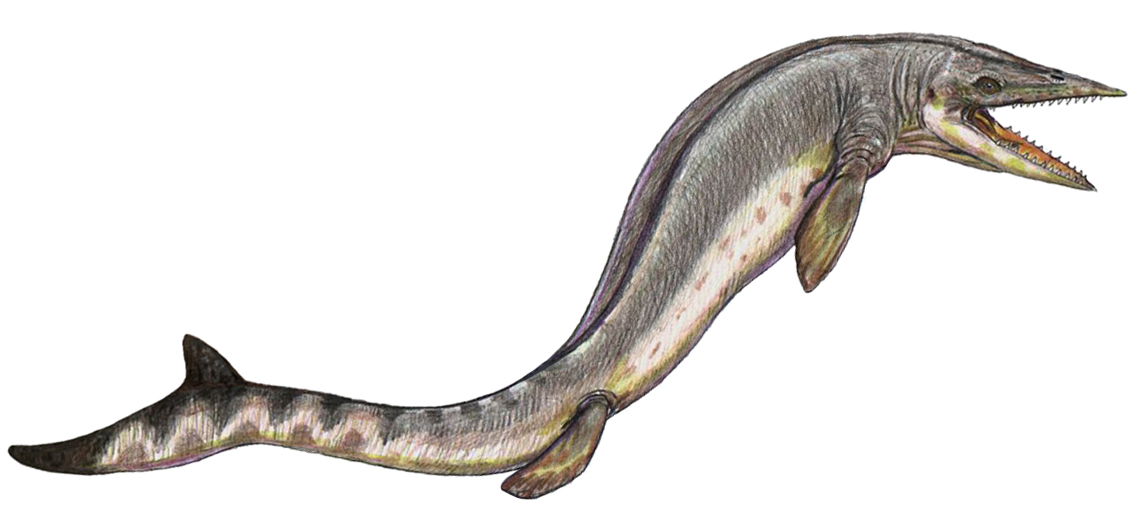
Taniwhasaurus

Fish were present, including one of the first frilled sharks, Chlamydoselachus thomsoni. Other marine vertebrates included the mosasaur Taniwhasaurus antarcticus, previously known as Lakumasaurus antarcticus. The close relation of T. antarcticus to other species of Taniwhasaurus found in New Zealand and Patagonia provides evidence for a Gondwanan endemism. Elasmosaurid plesiosaur remains are also known from this formation. The Alpha member has also yield the 1st cretaceous Turtle from Antarctica, a Chelonioid carapace.

Antarctopelta oliveroi, an ankylosaur, was discovered in 1986 on the northern part of James Ross Island about two kilometers south of Santa Marta Cove in Gamma Member beds of the Snow Hill Island Formation that were part originally considered part of the Santa Marta Formation. A titanosaurian sauropod was also discovered from the Santa Marta Formation.

== Paleoclimate ==
Estimates of mean annual temperatures using leaf margin analysis yielded values of 17.1°C (±2°C) to 21.2°C (±1.9°C) while the mean annual precipitation is tentatively estimated to 673mm to 1991mm (±580mm). Very high rainfall has been estimated for the growing season, from 2630mm to 2450mm (±482mm).

This data suggests the presence of a tropical to sub-tropical climate in northern Antarctica during the mid-late Cretaceous with no evidence of extended freezing conditions.

== See also ==
- List of fossiliferous stratigraphic units in Antarctica
- South Polar region of the Cretaceous
