= Axonoceras =

Axonoceras Temporal range: Campanian–Maastrichtian

Scientific classification
- Domain: Eukaryota
- Kingdom: Animalia
- Phylum: Mollusca
- Class: Cephalopoda
- Subclass: †Ammonoidea
- Order: †Ammonitida
- Suborder: †Ancyloceratina
- Family: †Nostoceratidae
- Genus: †Axonoceras; Stephenson, 1941

Species
- See text

Genus of molluscs (fossil)

Axonoceras is a genus in the ammonitid family Nostoceratidae proposed by Stephenson in 1941, for "slender shells coiled in a plane with numerous closely spaced ribs and two rows of ventral nodes'...The shells may be closely coiled, though not involute, but most... are more or less loosely and irregularly coiled". Shells may be coplanar or coiled in a low flat spiral with the early whorls in contact, later whorls free.

Axonoceras comes from the Campanian of Texas and New Jersey in the United States and Angola in west Aftrica. The type species is Axonoceras compressum Stephenson 1941.

Axonoceras and Exiteloceras are similar with Axonoceras sometimes considered a subjective synonym of Exiteloceras. The adult of Axonoceras however is very small. Exiteloceras is much larger
