= Matanuska Formation =

Geologic formation in Matanuska Valley, Alaska, U.S.

Coordinates: 61.9772°N 147.1790°W

- Stratigraphic range: Late Cretaceous
- Type: Geological formation

Location
- Region: North America

The Matanuska Formation consists of more than 3 km (1.9 mi) of sedimentary strata exposed in the northern Chugach Mountains, Matanuska Valley, and southern Talkeetna Mountains of south-central Alaska. The Matanuska Formation contains strata from Early Cretaceous (Albian) to Late Cretaceous (Maestrichtian). Parts of the formation contain abundant marine mollusks, foraminifera, and radiolaria. Fossils of nonmarine plants are found in some beds. Fossils of two dinosaurs have been recovered from marine mudstones in the formation. The lower Matanuska Formation (MF) is several hundred meters thick and includes nonmarine and marine sediments. Campanian-Maastrichtian graded sandstone, conglomerate, and mudstone comprise the upper 2000 m of the Formation.

== Invertebrate paleofauna ==
=== Annelida ===
Calcareous worm tube fossils are known from the formation.

| Color key: Taxon / Reclassified taxon / Taxon falsely reported as present / Dubious taxon or junior synonym / Ichnotaxon / Ootaxon / Morphotaxon | Notes; Uncertain or tentative taxa are in small text; ~~crossed out~~ taxa are discredited. |

Annelids reported from the Matanuska Formation
| Genus | Species | Location | Stratigraphic position | Material | Notes |
|---|---|---|---|---|---|
| Planolites | Indeterminate | | | | |

=== Bivalves ===
| Color key: Taxon / Reclassified taxon / Taxon falsely reported as present / Dubious taxon or junior synonym / Ichnotaxon / Ootaxon / Morphotaxon | Notes; Uncertain or tentative taxa are in small text; ~~crossed out~~ taxa are discredited. |

Bivalves reported from the Matanuska Formation
| Genus | Species | Location | Stratigraphic position | Material | Notes | Images |
|---|---|---|---|---|---|---|
| Acila | A. (Truncacila) sp. | | | | | Inoceramus |
| Inoceramus | I. cuvieri | | | | | Inoceramus |
| Inoceramus | I. hobetsensis | | | | | Inoceramus |
| Inoceramus | I. mamatensis | | | | | Inoceramus |
| Inoceramus | I. teshioensis | | | | | Inoceramus |
| Nucula | Indeterminate | | | | | Inoceramus |
| Teredolites | Indeterminate | | | | | Inoceramus |

=== Cephalopods ===
The formation's thin shelled heteromorphic ammonites probably lived at depths of 36–183 m. The formation's ammonites generally suggest that its rock were of Turonian age.

| Color key: Taxon / Reclassified taxon / Taxon falsely reported as present / Dubious taxon or junior synonym / Ichnotaxon / Ootaxon / Morphotaxon | Notes; Uncertain or tentative taxa are in small text; ~~crossed out~~ taxa are discredited. |

Cephalopods reported from the Matanuska Formation
| Genus | Species | Location | Stratigraphic position | Material | Notes |
|---|---|---|---|---|---|
| Eubostrychoceras | E. japonicum | | | | Eubostrychoceras is known from Japan, Germany, and Madagascar. E. japonicum is Turonian, and likely confined to the middle Turonian. |
| Gaudryceras | G. denseplicatum | | | | |
| Mesopusozia | M. indopacifica | | | | |
| Muramotoceras | M. yezoense | | | | Muramotoceras is an unusual heteromorph previously known only from Japan. It is also middle Turonian. |
| Otoscaphites | O. teshioensis | | | | Synonym of Yezoites. |
| Sciponoceras | Indeterminate | | | | |
| Tetragonites | T. glabrus | | | | |
| Yezoites | Y. puerculus | | | | |

=== Cnidarians ===
| Color key: Taxon / Reclassified taxon / Taxon falsely reported as present / Dubious taxon or junior synonym / Ichnotaxon / Ootaxon / Morphotaxon | Notes; Uncertain or tentative taxa are in small text; ~~crossed out~~ taxa are discredited. |

Cnidarians reported from the Matanuska Formation
| Genus | Species | Location | Stratigraphic position | Material | Notes |
|---|---|---|---|---|---|
| Platycanthus | Indeterminate | | | | Small solitary hexacoral. |

=== Gastropods ===
An unidentified naticid snail is known from the formation.

| Color key: Taxon / Reclassified taxon / Taxon falsely reported as present / Dubious taxon or junior synonym / Ichnotaxon / Ootaxon / Morphotaxon | Notes; Uncertain or tentative taxa are in small text; ~~crossed out~~ taxa are discredited. |

Gastropods reported from the Matanuska Formation
| Genus | Species | Location | Stratigraphic position | Material | Notes |
|---|---|---|---|---|---|
| Biplica | Indeterminate | | | | Opisthobranch |

=== Porifera ===
A sponge spicule fragment is known from the formation.

=== Scaphopods ===
Scaphopods reported from the Matanuska Formation
| Genus | Species | Location | Stratigraphic position | Material | Notes |
|---|---|---|---|---|---|
| Dentalium | Indeterminate | | | | |

== Vertebrate paleofauna ==
=== Cartilaginous Fish ===
Mako-like shark teeth are known from the formation.

=== Ray-finned fish ===
Other fish fossils include teeth, jaw fragments and scales.

=== Dinosaurs ===
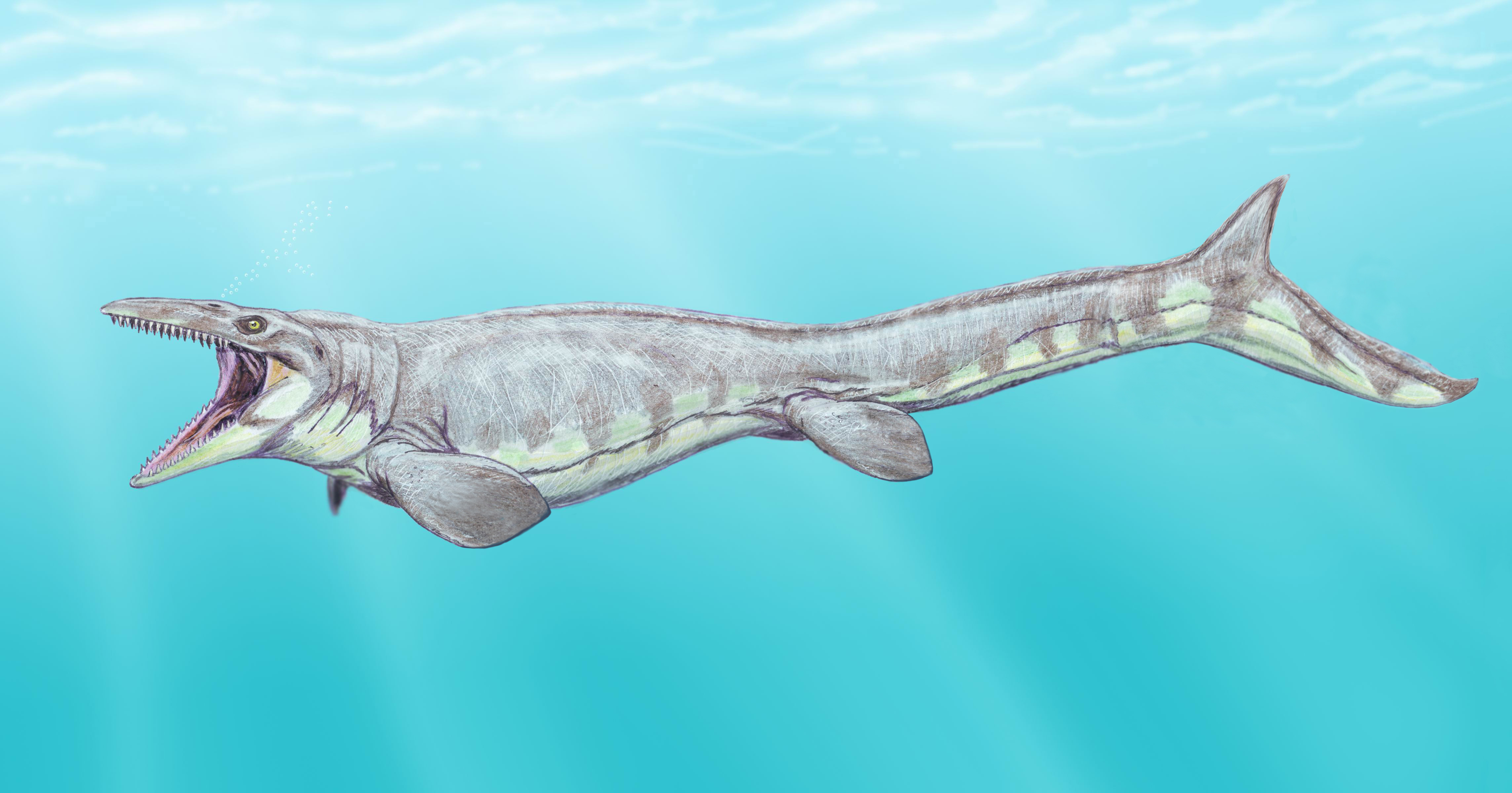
Tylosaurus proriger may have scavenged the Matanuska hadrosaur's remains after it drifted out to sea.

In 1994, excavations for road material uncovered a hadrosaur specimen near the Glenn Highway, approximately 150 miles northeast of Anchorage. That fall, excavation began on the specimen, now known as the "Talkeetna Mountains Hadrosaur" and concluded in the summer of 1996. The rocks containing the specimen were part of the formation's Member Four. The specimen is now housed at the University of Alaska Museum. It was formally described for the scientific literature by Pasch and May in 2001. The location of the specimen makes it significant as a biogeographic link between the hadrosaurs of North America and Asia. It was also the first associated skeleton of an individual dinosaur in Alaska.

Their examination of the specimen found the "Talkeetna Mountains Hadrosaur" to be a juvenile animal about 3 m (10 feet) long. It preserves the bones of the forelimbs, part of the front feet, ribs, and tail vertebrae. Other remains probably include the back vertebrae and pelvis. The researchers could not tell if the Talkeetna Mountains Hadrosaur was a hadrosaurid or lambeosaurid.

Pasch and May also attempted to reconstruct how the Talkeetna Mountains Hadrosaur came to be preserved in the fossil record. They determined that the specimen formed from the remains of a hadrosaur carcass that had bloated with gasses and been washed out to sea. Since none of the skull bones were present, the head must have fallen off before the carcass sank to the seafloor. The associated heteromorphic ammonites and inoceramid bivalves indicate that the Talkeetna Mountains Hadrosaur was buried at a depth greater than 35 m. The body came to rest on its left side with limbs outstretched. Pyrite was present in the rocks around the specimen, and may have formed from sulfur given off by the bacteria consuming the carcass.

About 20% of the hadrosaur's bones were enveloped by calcareous concretions but every single bone not found in a concretion bore many closely spaced ovular conical depressions. These ranged in diameter from 2.1 to 5.8 mm and from 1.6 to 3.6 mm deep. The damage to the body must have occurred after it drifted out to sea because if the damage had occurred beforehand, it likely would have punctured the body, preventing the buildup of bloating gases that allowed the carcass to drift out to sea in the first place. The depressions are the wrong shape to have been gastropod or sponge borings, so they are probably bite marks. However, none of the teeth belonging to the fishes preserved in the Matanuska Formation fit the size or arrangement of the bite marks. Pasch and May therefore ruled them out as candidates for the bite marks' origin.

Nevertheless, the size, spacing, and shape of the marks were similar to those of teeth from the mosasaur species Tylosaurus proriger. The distribution of bite marks corresponds inversely to the presence of flesh in the animal. For instance, lower limb bones sustained the most damage because there was the least amount of flesh shielding the bones at those locations. The largest parts of the animal would have been too large for the scavenging mosasaur to completely wrap its jaws around, and these are the areas around which the concretions formed. By contrast, the bones pulled free from the carcass were buried in the mud, which later lithified as mudstone.

=== Lizards ===
The size, spacing, and shape of apparent bite marks on the bones of the Talkeetna Mountains Hadrosaur were similar to those of teeth from the mosasaur species Tylosaurus proriger, suggests that some similar animal swam in the waters of the Matanuska Formation's depositional environment.

== Paleoflora ==
=== Palynomorphs ===
- Lycopodophyta: One Species
- Pteridophyta: Sixty-Nine Species
- Ginkgophyta: Nine Species
- Cycadophyta: Nine Species
- Pinophyta: Nine Species
- Anthophyta: Five Species

=== Trees ===
Fragments of petrified wood are known from the formation.

== See also ==
- List of dinosaur-bearing rock formations
