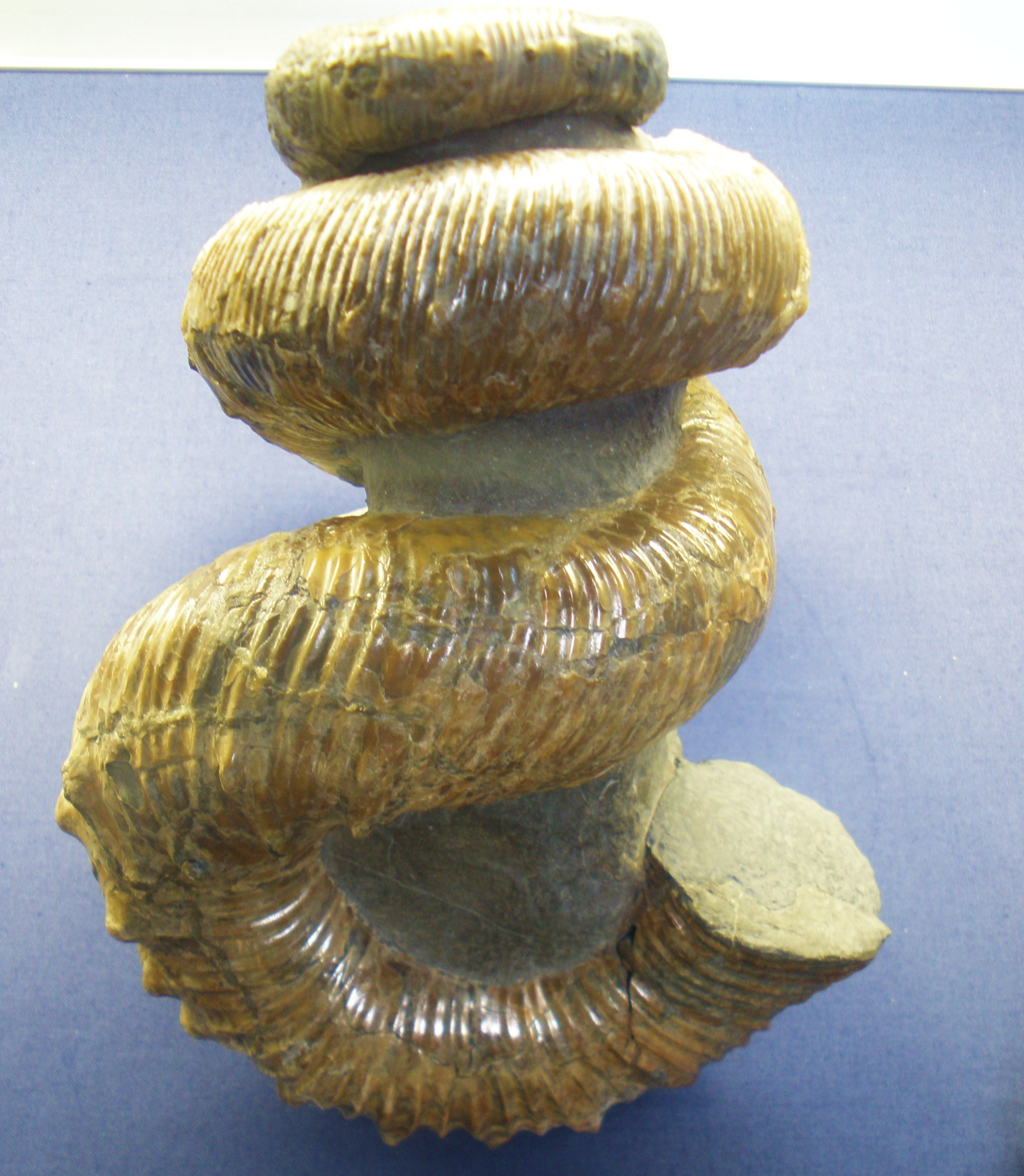

Scientific classification
- Domain: Eukaryota
- Kingdom: Animalia
- Phylum: Mollusca
- Class: Cephalopoda
- Subclass: †Ammonoidea
- Order: †Ammonitida
- Suborder: †Ancyloceratina
- Family: †Nostoceratidae (?)
- Genus: †Didymoceras
- Species: †D. nebrascense

Binomial name
- †Didymoceras nebrascense (Meek and Hayden, 1856)

Synonyms
- Ancyloceras nebrascensis Meek and Hayden, 1856; Cirroceras nebraskense (Meek and Hayden, 1856); Didymoceras nebrascensis (Meek and Hayden, 1856); Emperoceras beecheri Hyatt, 1894, Emperoceras simplicostatum Whitfield, 1902; Helicoceras nebrascense (Meek and Hayden, 1856); Heteroceras nebrascense (Meek and Hayden, 1856); Heteroceras simplicostatum Whitfield, 1902; Nostoceras (Didymoceras) nebrascense (Meek and Hayden, 1856); Turrilites nebrascensis (Meek and Hayden, 1856)

= Didymoceras nebrascense =

Didymoceras nebrascense Temporal range: Upper Campanian

Extinct species of ammonite

Didymoceras nebrascense was an extinct species of heteromorph ammonite from the upper Campanian age (around 83 to 70 million years ago). It was sexually dimorphic, with two adult sizes averaging at 270 mm (11 in) and 180 mm (7.1 in) high for females and males respectively. It exhibited three distinct growth stages. The first growth stage was composed of one or two straight sharply bending sections and a gently curved third. The second growth stage is composed of around three and a half loosely coiling whorls. The last (adult) growth stage is composed of a U-shaped bend facing upwards.

== Description ==
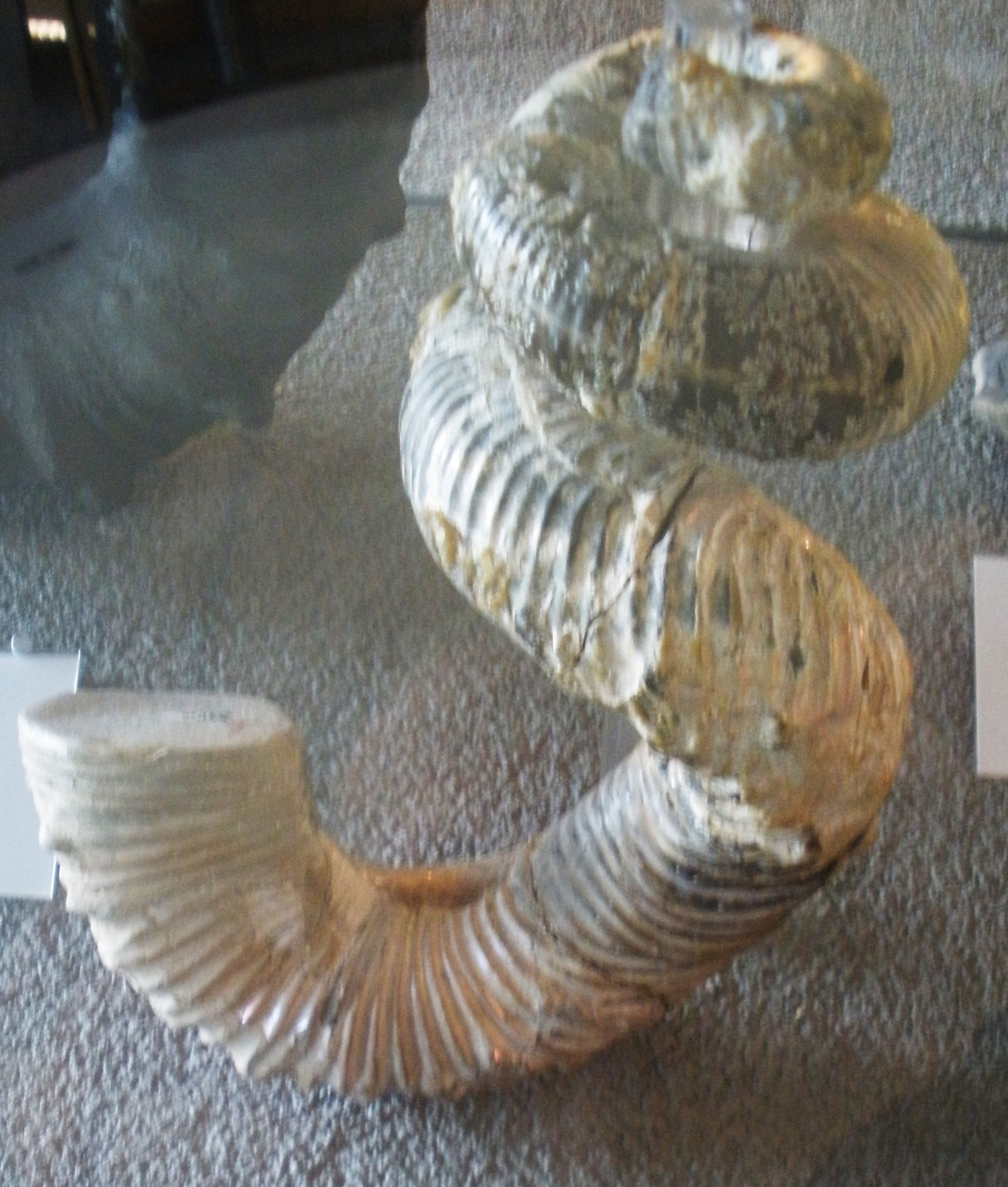
Didymoceras nebrascense showing the loosely coiled middle growth stage and the U-shaped adult growth stage. The first growth stage is missing.

Didymoceras nebrascense is relatively easily identifiable. It has three growth stages. The initial growth stage produces two more or less straight sections connected with each other by a sharply bent elbow. The sections are parallel to each other or diverging at an angle of 10° to 30°. The second, larger straight section is elliptical in cross-section, higher than it is wide. It connects to a third more broadly curving elbow. Like the second straight section, its cross section is also elliptical. Occasionally, some individuals only has one straight section and one curved section for the first growth stage.

The middle growth stage begins at the end of the last curved limb of the first growth stage. It is composed of three and a half loosely coiled whorls. The whorls are usually widely separated, but some individuals display whorls that are just barely touching each other. The ribbing becomes denser than in the first growth stage and its cross-section is more or less circular.

The third growth stage is that of the adult. It is composed of a single distinctive upward-facing U-shaped whorl. Ornamentation of Didymoceras nebrascense consists of a double row of nodes running along the ventral side. They are usually evenly matched with each other, but can sometimes alternate briefly. The straight sections of the first growth stage shows evidence of small sharp spines on the tubercles. The coiling can be to the left or right.

Didymoceras nebrascense is sexually dimorphic, with adults showing two average heights - the smaller male adults (microconchs) had an average height of 180 mm (7.1 in); while the larger female adults (macroconchs) had the average height of 270 mm (11 in).

== Taxonomy ==
Didymoceras nebrascense was originally described (tentatively) in 1856 as Ancyloceras nebrascensis by the paleontologists Fielding B. Meek and Ferdinand V. Hayden. The holotype was collected from Iquor Creek of Cheyenne County, Nebraska. It was poorly preserved and incomplete, being a mere 2 in (51 mm) fragment. This led other workers to erroneously classify further discoveries of the same species as new species - notably Emperoceras beecheri and Helicoceras simplicostatum by Alpheus Hyatt (1894) and Robert Parr Whitfield (1902) respectively.

It has been classified under various genera by different authors, reflecting the constantly shifting opinions when it comes to heteromorph ammonites. Kennedy et al. (2000) placed it under the genus Didymoceras, which in turn is classified under the family Nostoceratidae under the diverse suborder of heteromorph ammonites, Ancyloceratina.

== Distribution ==
Didymoceras nebrascense occurs in the western edge of what was once an ancient sea that stretched from northern New Mexico to northeastern Montana in the upper Campanian age (around 83 to 70 million years ago) of the late Cretaceous. A putative specimen from the Mishash Formation of Israel has also been recorded in 1969.
