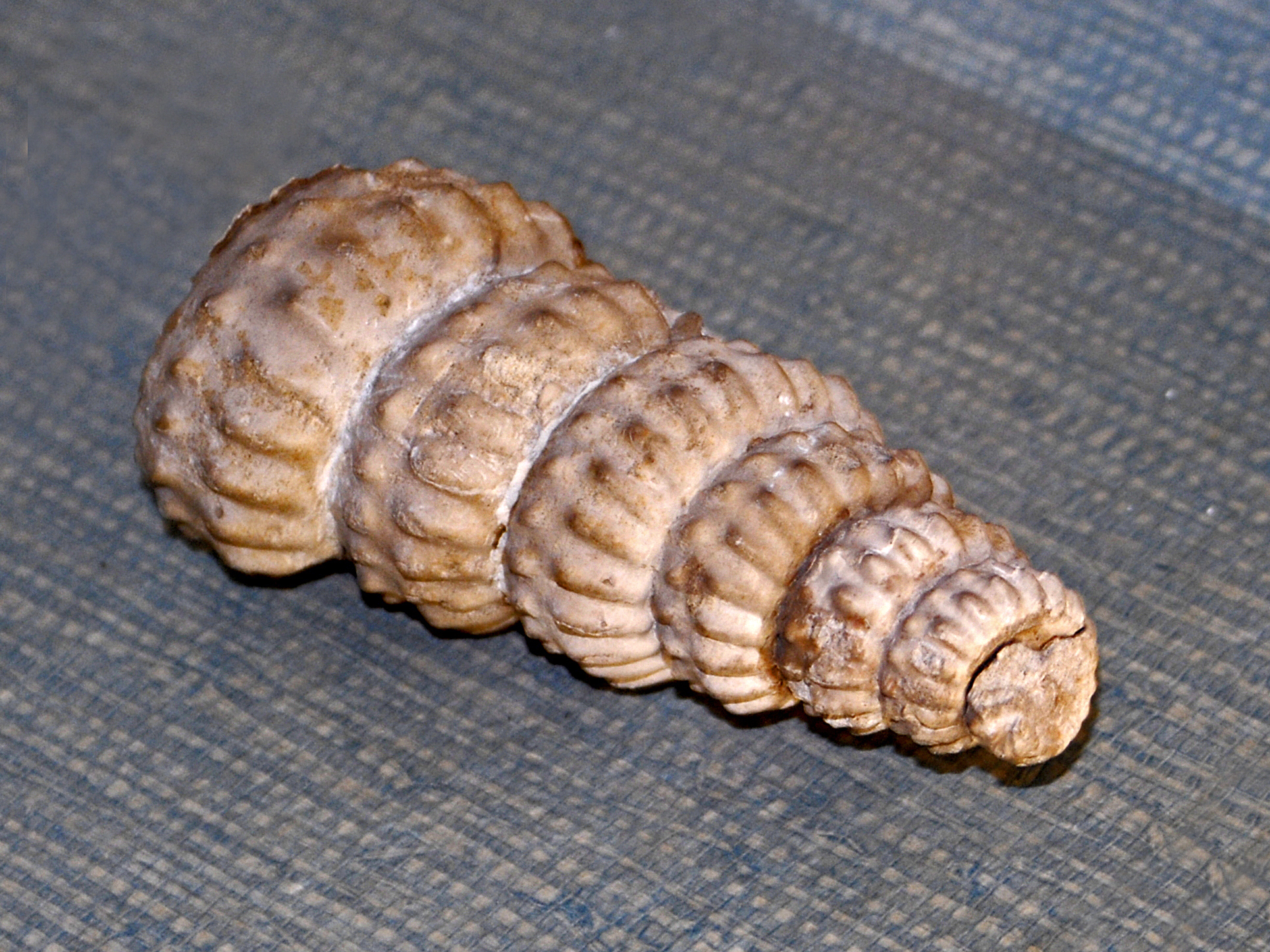
- Turrilites costatus from Rouen, France, on display at Galerie de paléontologie et d'anatomie comparée, Paris

Scientific classification
- Domain: Eukaryota
- Kingdom: Animalia
- Phylum: Mollusca
- Class: Cephalopoda
- Subclass: †Ammonoidea
- Order: †Ammonitida
- Suborder: †Ancyloceratina
- Family: †Turrilitidae
- Genus: †Turrilites
- Species: †T. costatus

Binomial name
- †Turrilites costatus Lamarck, 1801

= Turrilites costatus =

Turrilites costatus Temporal range: Cenomanian

Species of mollusc

Turrilites (Turrilites) costatus is a species of helically coiled ammonoid cephalopod, from the lower part of the Upper Cretaceous (Cenomanian).

== Description ==
The shell of this species can reach a length of about 11 centimetres (4.3 in). It is tightly wound in a high trochospiral, with an acute angle at the apex. Ribs are weak, with rows of strong tubercles.
