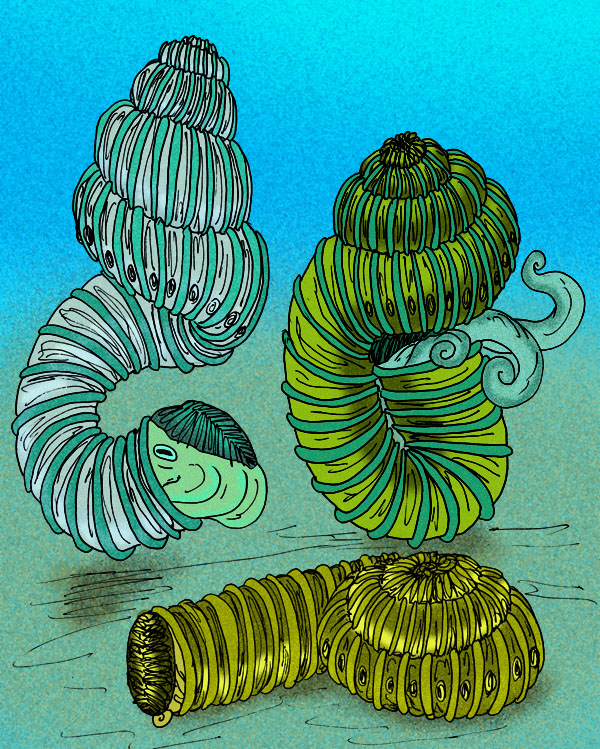
- Nostoceras sp.

Scientific classification
- Kingdom: Animalia
- Phylum: Mollusca
- Class: Cephalopoda
- Subclass: †Ammonoidea
- Order: †Ammonitida
- Suborder: †Ancyloceratina
- Superfamily: †Turrilitoidea
- Family: †Nostoceratidae; Hyatt, 1894

Type genus
- Nostoceras Hyatt, 1894

Genera
- Ainoceras; Anaklinoceras; Ankinatsytes; Axonoceras; Bostrychoceras; Didymoceras; Eubostrychoceras; Exiteloceras; Hyphantoceras; Jouaniceras; Limusoceras; Madagascarites; Muramotoceras; Nipponites; Nostoceras; Pravitoceras; Tridenticeras; Yezoceras

= Nostoceratidae =

Nostoceratidae Temporal range: Late Cretaceous

Extinct family of ammonites

Nostoceratidae was a diverse family of heteromorph ammonites found throughout the oceans of the world during the Late Cretaceous period. Many genera, such as Yezoceras, Ainoceras, Limusoceras, Anaklinoceras, and some species of Bostrychoceras and Eubostrychoceras, display, as young shells at least, a helical coiling very similar to the shells of the related family, Turrilitidae. As adults, though, the coils then curve away from the axis of coiling, either as an oxbow-like curve around the juvenile coils as in Ainoceras and Anaklinoceras, or in a simple curved loop beneath the juvenile coils, as in Yezoceras. Other genera form loose coils, sometimes in a spiral, such as those of Madagascarites, Muramotoceras, Hyphantoceras, and Nipponites.

The ecology of nostoceratids is the subject of continued speculation, as their coiled shells had no streamlining, strongly suggesting that the living animals had extraordinarily poor swimming ability, if any ability at all. As such, experts and ammonite enthusiasts presume that the nostoceratids either floated passively in the water column, or were bottom-dwellers that may or may not have crawled on the seafloor.

The nostoceratids, as with most other Cretaceous ammonites, perished during the Cretaceous–Paleogene extinction event.
