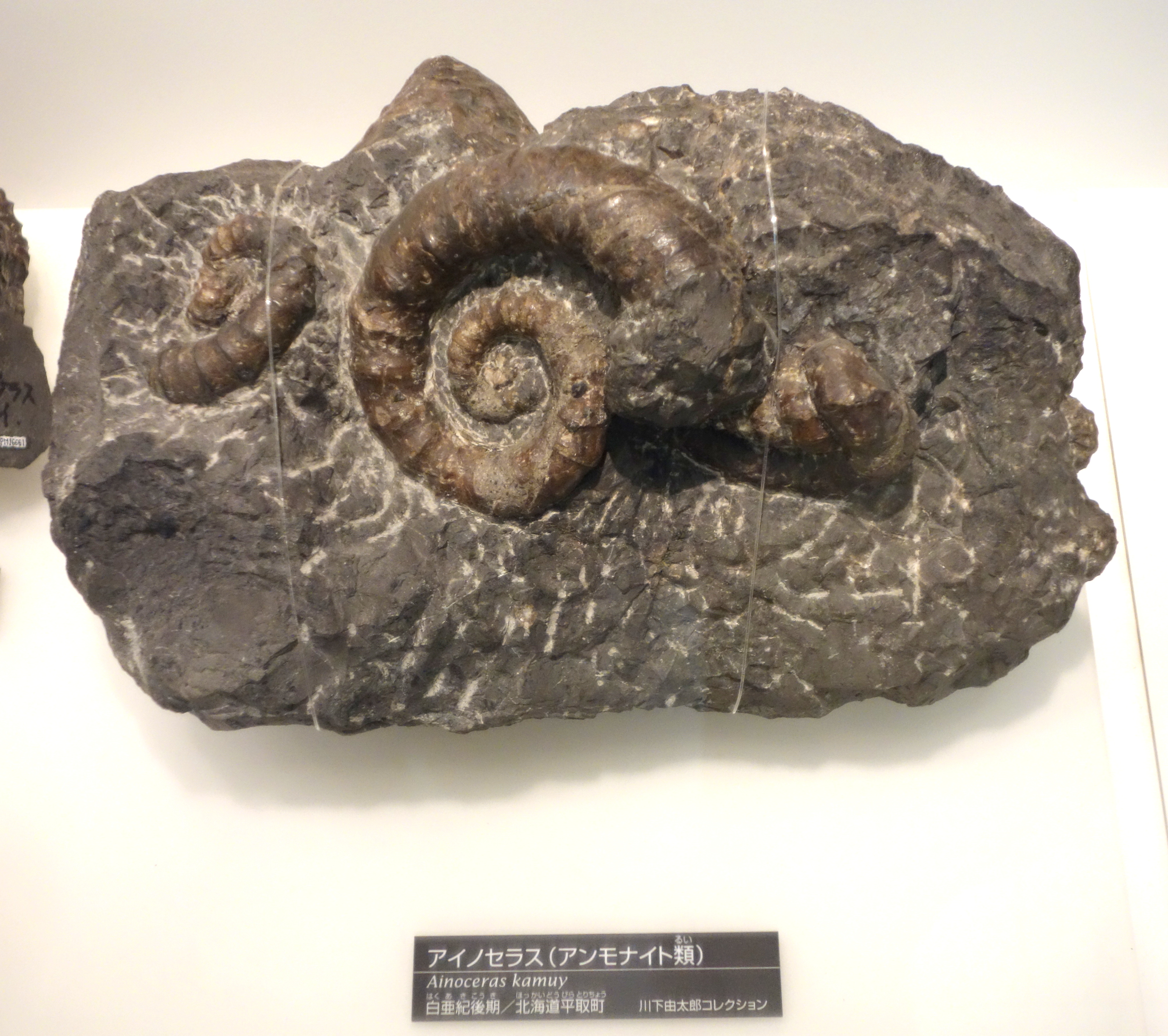
- Ainoceras kamuy

Scientific classification
- Domain: Eukaryota
- Kingdom: Animalia
- Phylum: Mollusca
- Class: Cephalopoda
- Subclass: †Ammonoidea
- Order: †Ammonitida
- Suborder: †Ancyloceratina
- Family: †Nostoceratidae
- Genus: †Ainoceras; Matsumoto & Kanie, 1967

= Ainoceras =

Ainoceras Temporal range: Campanian

Genus of molluscs (fossil)

Ainoceras ("Ainu's Horn") is a genus of extinct, aberrantly coiled ammonite cephalopod that live in the Pacific Ocean during the Campanian division of the Cretaceous, where Japan is today. Their shells were coiled very similarly to the related Anaklinoceras, in that, when young, the shell coiled helically, and then upon reaching adulthood, the shell then bent over the older coils. However, Ainoceras differed in this respect in that, whereas in Anaklinoceras, the youngest coil wrapped very closely around the older coils, while in Ainoceras, the youngest coil bent over the older coils in a wide loop or oxbow.
