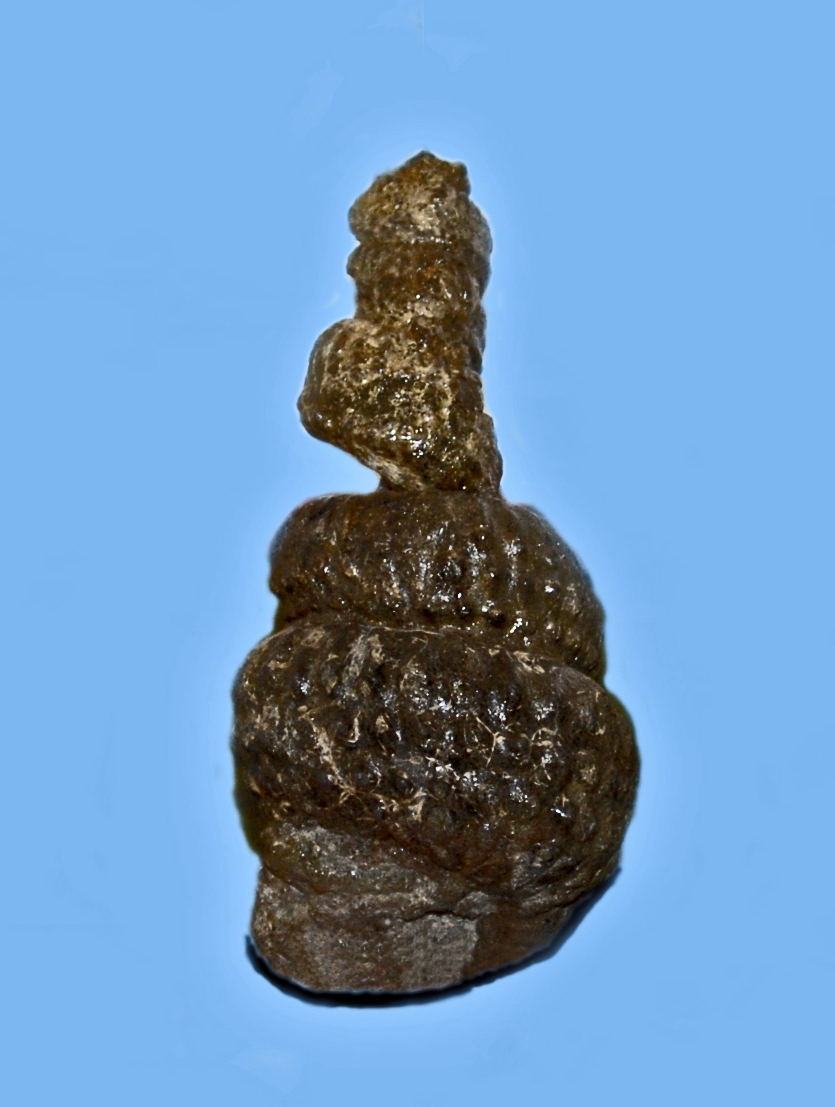
- Fossil internal model of Ostlingoceras puzosianum from Cretaceous of France

Scientific classification
- Kingdom: Animalia
- Phylum: Mollusca
- Class: Cephalopoda
- Subclass: †Ammonoidea
- Order: †Ammonitida
- Suborder: †Ancyloceratina
- Family: †Turrilitidae
- Genus: †Ostlingoceras; Hyatt, 1900

= Ostlingoceras =

Ostlingoceras Temporal range: 99.7–94.3 Ma

Extinct genus of ammonites

Ostlingoceras is an extinct genus of ammonites belonging to the Turrilitidae family.

== Species ==
- Ostlingoceras brandi Young, 1958
- Ostlingoceras conlini Clark, 1955
- Ostlingoceras puzosianum (d'Orbigny, 1842)
- Ostlingoceras rorayensis (Collignon, 1964)

== Fossil record ==
Fossils of Ostlingoceras are found in marine strata of the Cretaceous (age range: from 99.7 to 94.3 million years ago.). Fossils are known from some localities in Angola, France, Italy, Madagascar, Mozambique, Switzerland, the United Kingdom and United States.
