= Late Campanian Event =

The Late Campanian Event was a carbon cycle and climatic event that occurred during the Campanian Age of the Cretaceous Period.

== Timeline ==
The LCE has been variously estimated to have lasted for anywhere from 0.7 to 1.0 Myr (million years). A recent study based on a sequence in southern India gave an estimate of about 0.8-0.9 Myr, while sections in Germany and the North Sea give a length of 1.0 Myr.
