= Ankinatsytes =

Ankinatsytes Temporal range: Coniacian ~89.3–85.8 Ma

Scientific classification
- Kingdom: Animalia
- Phylum: Mollusca
- Class: Cephalopoda
- Subclass: †Ammonoidea
- Order: †Ammonitida
- Suborder: †Ancyloceratina
- Family: †Nostoceratidae
- Genus: †Ankinatsytes; Collignon 1965

Species
- A. venezolanus Renz,1982; A. yabei Collignon,1965

Genus of molluscs (fossil)

Ankinatsytes is an extinct genus of cephalopod belonging to the Ammonite subclass. The ammonite is from the Late Cretaceous of Colombia (Loma Gorda Formation) and Venezuela (La Luna Formation).

== Species ==
The following species have been described:

- Ankinatsytes venezolanus
- Ankinatsytes yabei
