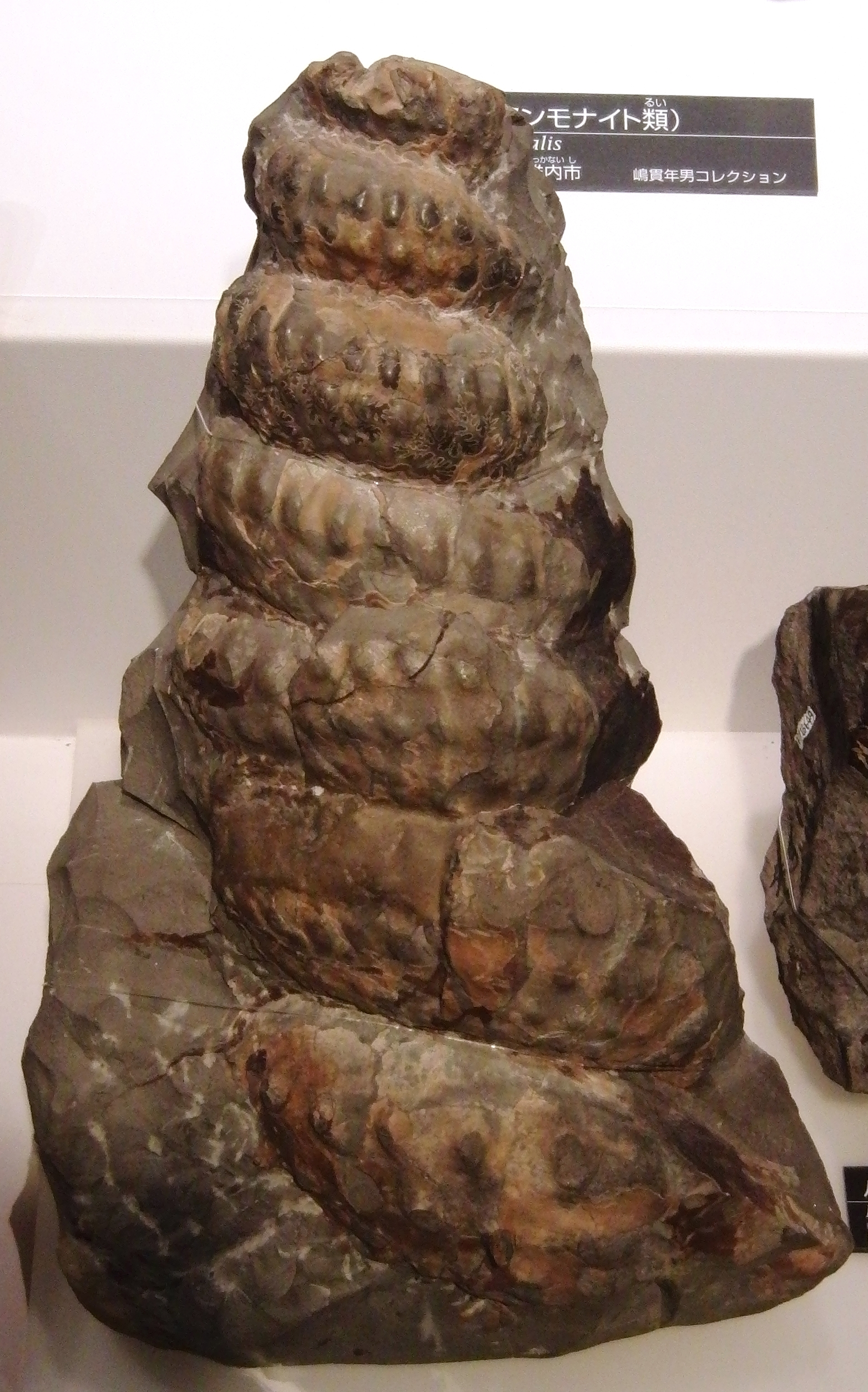
- Mariella lewesiensis fossil

Scientific classification
- Kingdom: Animalia
- Phylum: Mollusca
- Class: Cephalopoda
- Subclass: †Ammonoidea
- Order: †Ammonitida
- Suborder: †Ancyloceratina
- Family: †Turrilitidae
- Genus: †Mariella; Nowak, 1916

= Mariella =

Mariella Temporal range: Albian–Cenomanian

Genus of ammonites

Mariella is a genus of ammonites, named by Nowak (1916) from the upper Albian and Cenomanian stages of the mid Cretaceous, included in the Turrilitidae. Its type is Turrilites bergeri

== Description ==
Mariella resembles Turrilites in general form. The shell is asymmetric, closely wound in a long expanding trochoidal spire. Ribs are slightly oblique and are rather feeble, each with 4 more or less equally spaced tubercles. Turrilites differs primarily in being more strongly ribbed and in having a more oval aperture.

== Distribution ==
Fossils of Mariella have been found in Angola, Antarctica, Australia, Brazil, Canada (British Columbia), Colombia (Hiló Formation), France, Germany, Iran, Japan, Kazakhstan, Madagascar, Mexico, Mozambique, New Zealand, South Africa, Spain, Switzerland, Turkmenistan, Ukraine, the United Kingdom, and the United States (California, Texas, Oregon).
