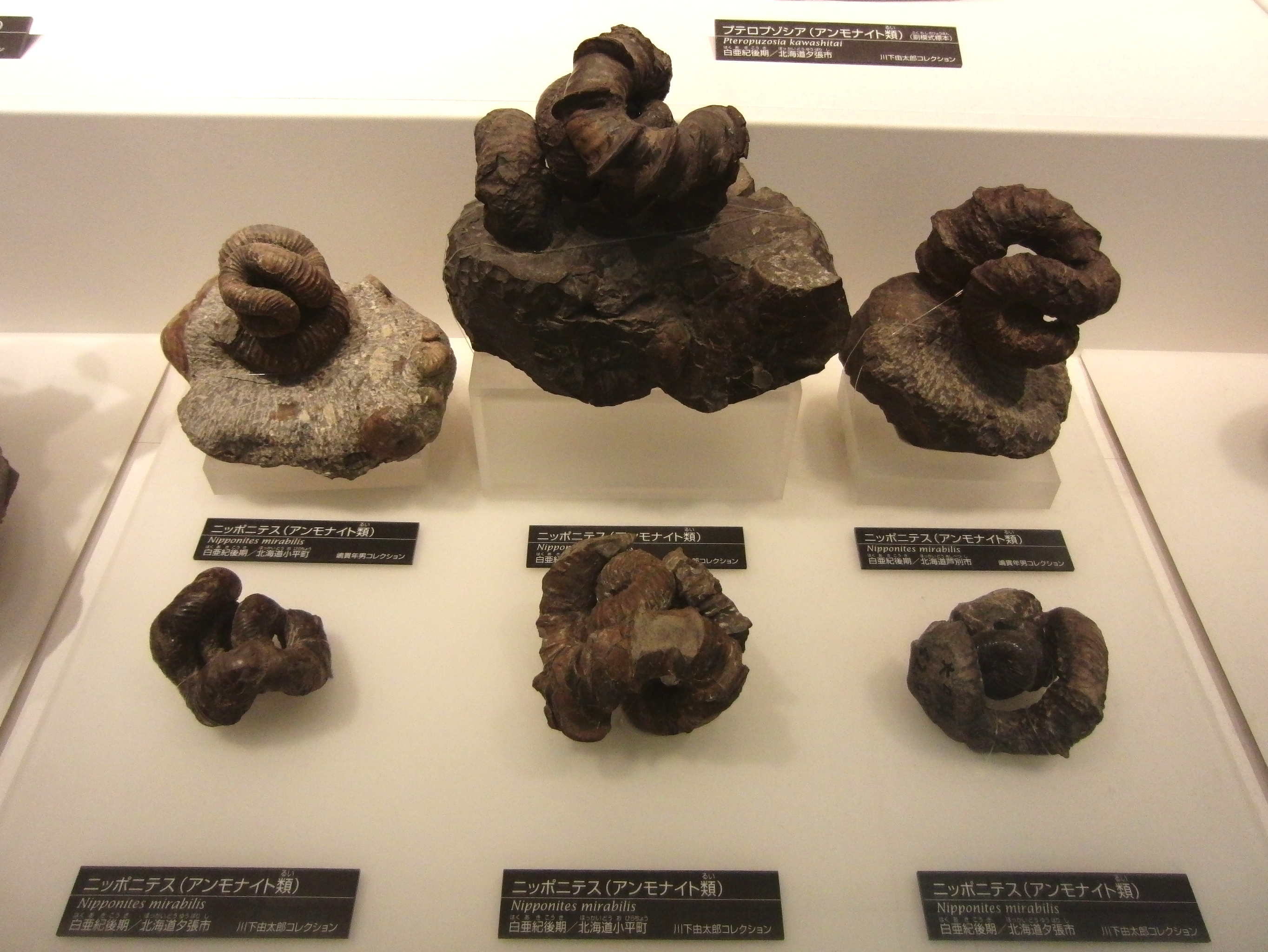
- Fossils of Nipponites mirabilis from an exhibit at the National Museum of Nature and Science, Tokyo, Japan

Scientific classification
- Kingdom: Animalia
- Phylum: Mollusca
- Class: Cephalopoda
- Subclass: †Ammonoidea
- Order: †Ammonitida
- Suborder: †Ancyloceratina
- Family: †Nostoceratidae
- Genus: †Nipponites; Yabe, 1904

Species
- N. mirabilis Yabe, 1904 (type species); N. bacchus Matsumoto and Muramoto, 1967; N. occidentalis Ward and Westermann, 1977; N. sachalinensis Kawada, 1929

= Nipponites =

Nipponites Temporal range: Turonian–Santonian

Genus of molluscs (fossil)

Nipponites is an extinct genus of heteromorph ammonites. The shells of Nipponites (primarily N. mirabilis) form "ox-bow" bends, resulting in some of the most bizarre shapes seen among ammonites.

The ecology of Nipponites, as with many other nostoceratids, is subject to much speculation.

== Distribution ==
Fossils of most species are found primarily in Upper Cretaceous strata of Japan. N. mirabilis is found in Coniacian-aged strata of Japan and possibly Turonian-aged strata in Madagascar. N. bacchus is found in Upper Cretaceous Hokkaido. Two species are found exclusively outside Japan, N. sachalinensis, which is found in Upper Cretaceous strata of Sakhalin island, and Kamchatka peninsula, and N. occidentalis, which is known from two shells found in the Turonian-aged Hornbrook Formation of Southern Oregon.

== In popular culture ==
A Japanese academic institution Paleontological Society of Japan (ja:日本古生物学会) has Nipponites as its symbol. That organization established October 15 as "Fossil Day", according to the date of first description of N. mirabilis and "International Fossil Day" by International Palaeontological Association (not to confuse with National Fossil Day).

== Image gallery ==
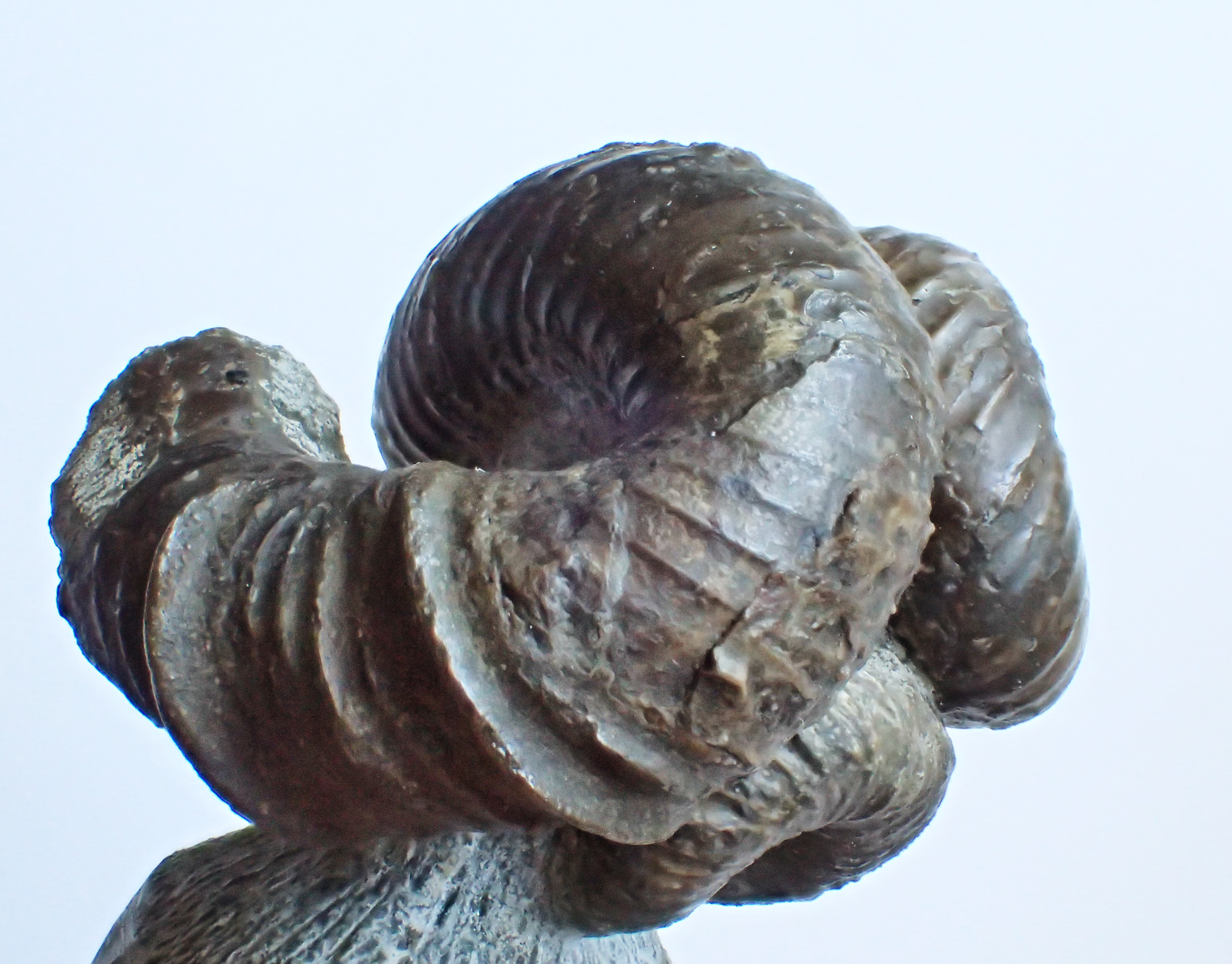
N. mirabilis

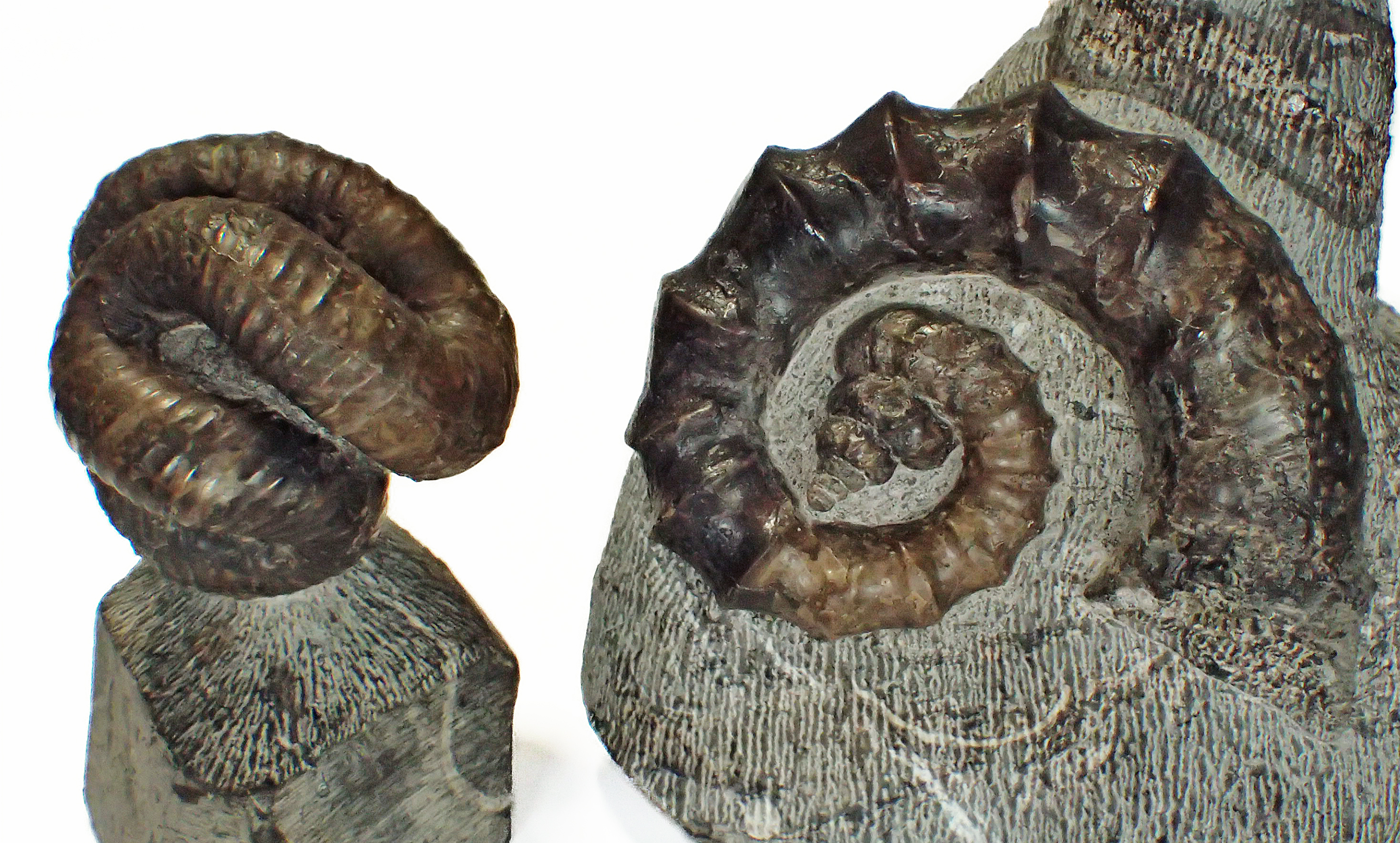
N. mirabilis

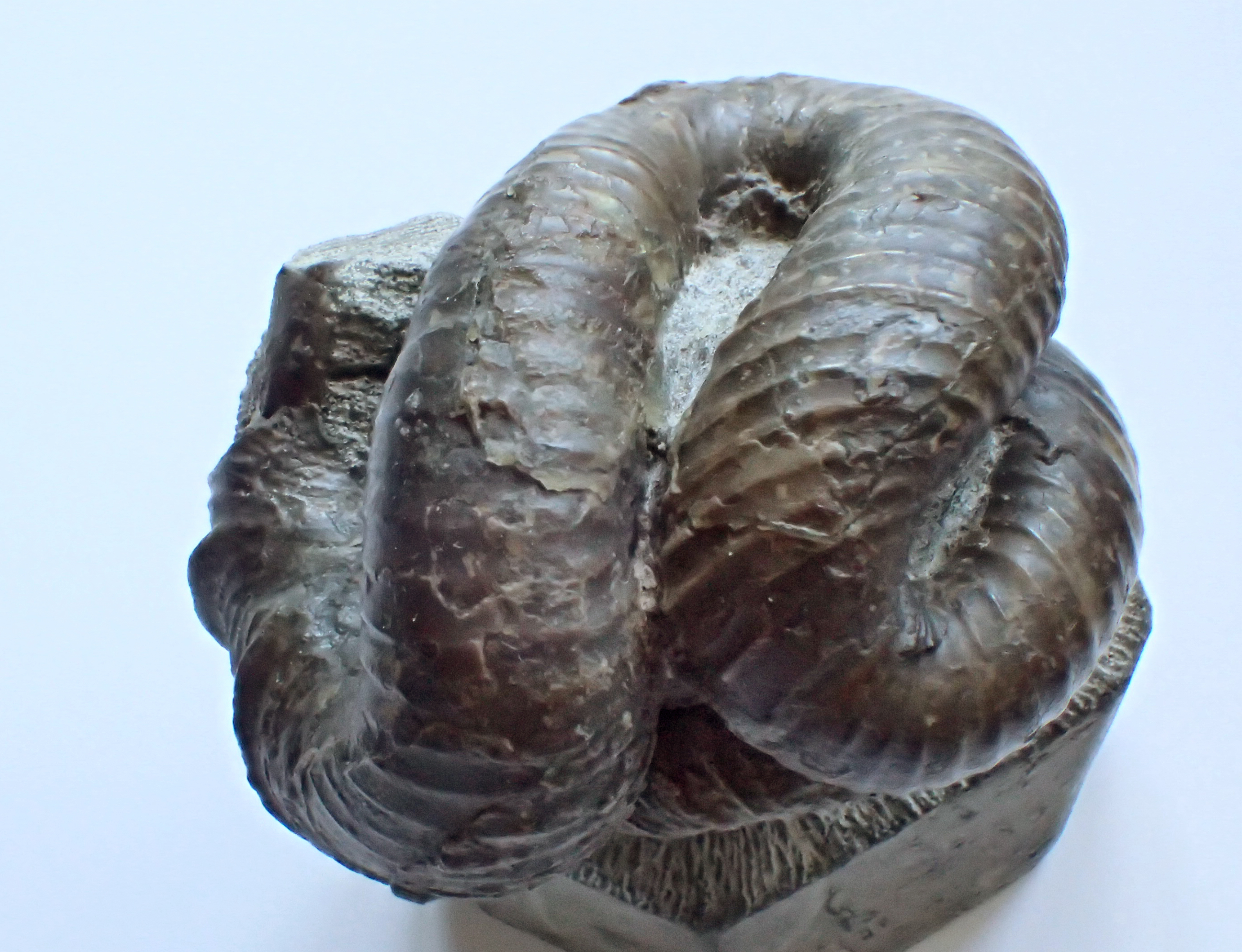
N. mirabilis
