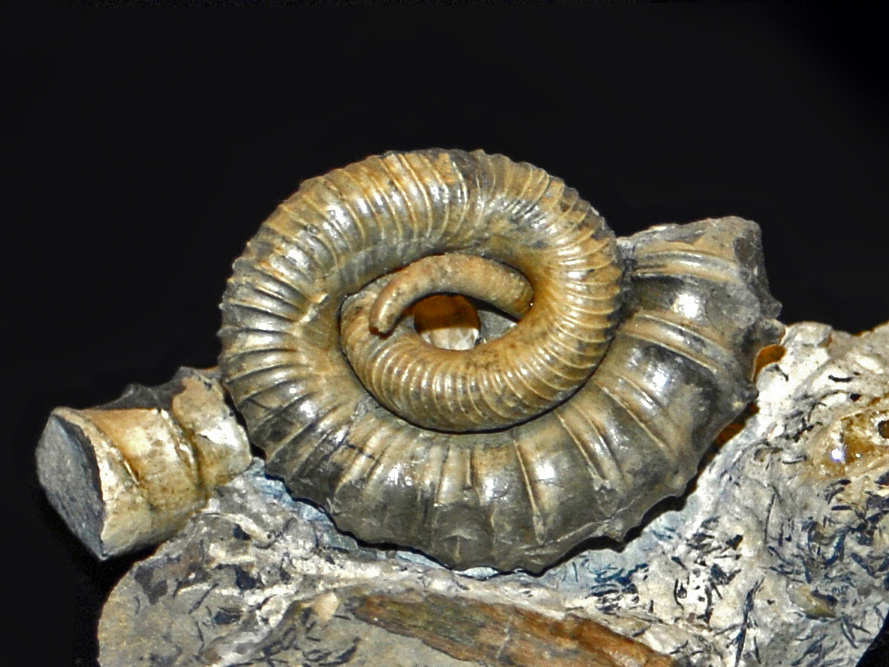
- Fossil of Muramotoceras from Upper Cretaceous of Japan

Scientific classification
- Domain: Eukaryota
- Kingdom: Animalia
- Phylum: Mollusca
- Class: Cephalopoda
- Subclass: †Ammonoidea
- Order: †Ammonitida
- Suborder: †Ancyloceratina
- Family: †Nostoceratidae
- Genus: †Muramotoceras; Matsumoto, 1967

= Muramotoceras =

Muramotoceras Temporal range: Turonian–Santonian

Genus of molluscs (fossil)

Muramotoceras was an unusual genus of heteromorphic ammonite. It was known only from Japan until researchers reported in 2001 that the genus was present in Alaska's Matanuska Formation as well. Its remains likely date to the middle Turonian (from 89.8 to 93.9 million years ago) in both areas. Subsequently it was also described from the Santonian Gosau Group (Austria).

== See also ==
- List of ammonites
