= Anaklinoceras =

Anaklinoceras Temporal range: Campanian

Scientific classification
- Domain: Eukaryota
- Kingdom: Animalia
- Phylum: Mollusca
- Class: Cephalopoda
- Subclass: †Ammonoidea
- Order: †Ammonitida
- Suborder: †Ancyloceratina
- Family: †Nostoceratidae
- Genus: †Anaklinoceras; Stephenson, 1941

Genus of molluscs (fossil)

Anaklinoceras is a genus of extinct heteromorph ammonite cephalopod that lived in marine environments in what is now Western North America during the Campanian division of the Cretaceous period. Their shells were very similar to the related ammonites of the genus Ainoceras, where the young ammonite's shell coiled helically, and upon reaching adulthood, the youngest coil arched over the older coils.
