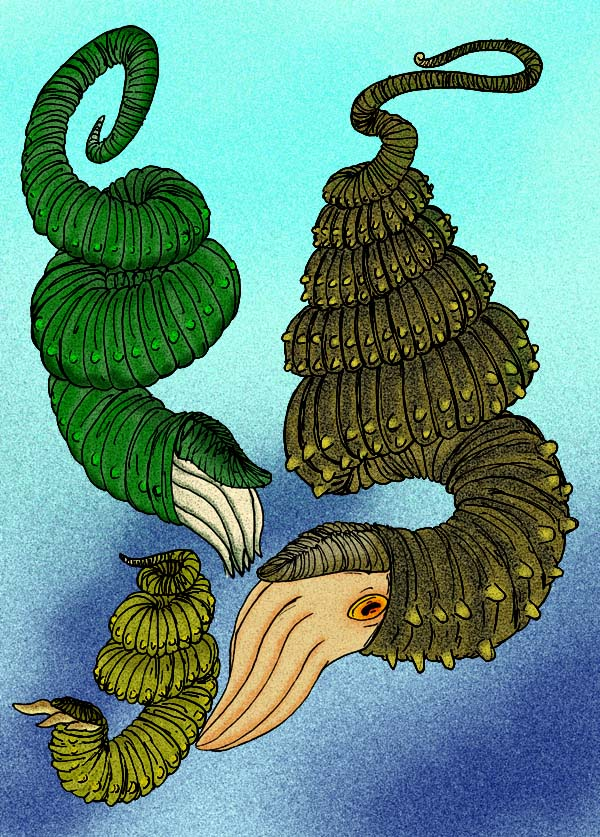
- Artist's reconstruction of D. stevensoni, D. nebrascensis, and D. cheyennese

Scientific classification
- Kingdom: Animalia
- Phylum: Mollusca
- Class: Cephalopoda
- Subclass: †Ammonoidea
- Order: †Ammonitida
- Suborder: †Ancyloceratina
- Family: †Nostoceratidae (?)
- Genus: †Didymoceras; Hyatt, 1894

Species
- See text

Synonyms
- Cirroceras Conrad, 1866; Helicoceras d'Orbigny, 1842; Helicoceras Whitfield, 1877; Emperoceras Hyatt, 1894; Didymoceratoides Kennedy & Cobban, 1993

= Didymoceras =

Didymoceras Temporal range: Upper Campanian

Genus of molluscs (fossil)

Didymoceras is an extinct genus of ammonite cephalopod from the Late Cretaceous epoch (approximately 76 Ma). It is one of the most bizarrely shaped genera, with a shell that spirals upwards into a loose, hooked tip. It is thought to have drifted in the water vertically, moving up and down. The genus name comes from Ancient Greek δίδυμος (dídumos), meaning "twin", and κέρας (céras), meaning "horn".

Its taxonomic place is often in flux, being placed in either Turrilitidae, Nostoceratidae, or its own family, Didymoceratidae. Species included in the genus are the following:

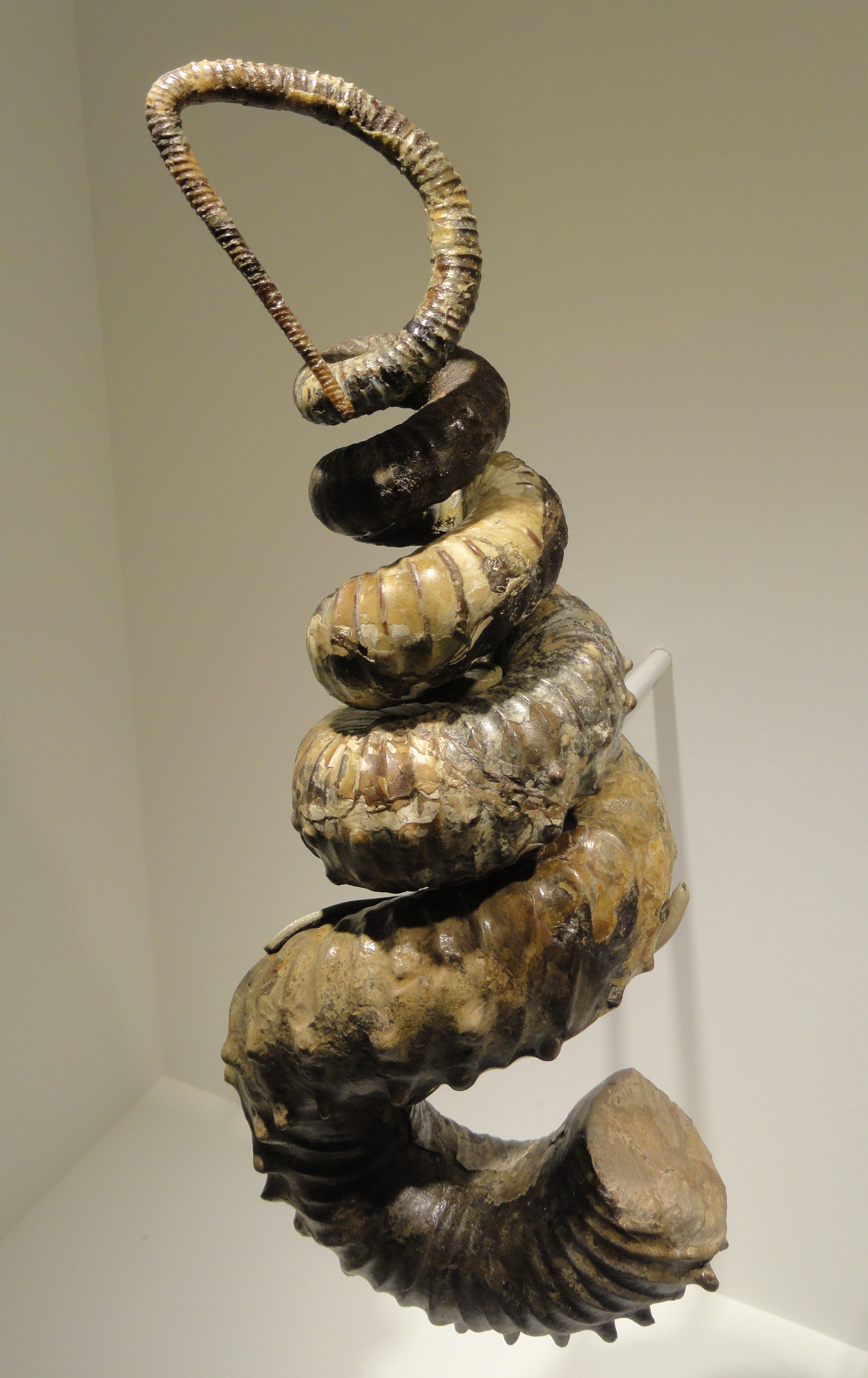
D. stevensoni shell exhibit in the Houston Museum of Natural Science

- Didymoceras angulatum (Meek and Hayden, 1860)
- Didymoceras binodosum Kennedy and Cobban, 1993
- Didymoceras californicum Anderson, 1958
- Didymoceras cheyenense (Meek and Hayden, 1856)
- Didymoceras cheyennense (Meek and Hayden, 1856)
- Didymoceras cochleatus (Meek and Hayden, 1858)
- Didymoceras hidakense Shigeta in Shigeta et al., 2016
- Didymoceras hornbyense (Whiteaves, 1876)
- Didymoceras navarroensis (Shumard, 1861)
- Didymoceras nebrascense Meek and Hayden, 1856)
- Didymoceras newtoni (Whitfield, 1877)
- Didymoceras nicolletii (Hall and Meek, 1856)
- Didymoceras platycostatum Kennedy and Cobban, 1993
- Didymoceras stevensoni (Whitfield, 1877)
- Didymoceras subtuberculatum Howarth, 1965
- Didymoceras tenuicostatus (Meek and Hayden, 1858)
- Didymoceras tortus (Meek and Hayden, 1858)
- Didymoceras tricostatus (Whitfield, 1897)
- Didymoceras umbilicatu (Meek and Hayden, 1858)
- Didymoceras uncus (Meek and Hayden, 1858)
- Didymoceras vespertinus (Conrad, 1874)
