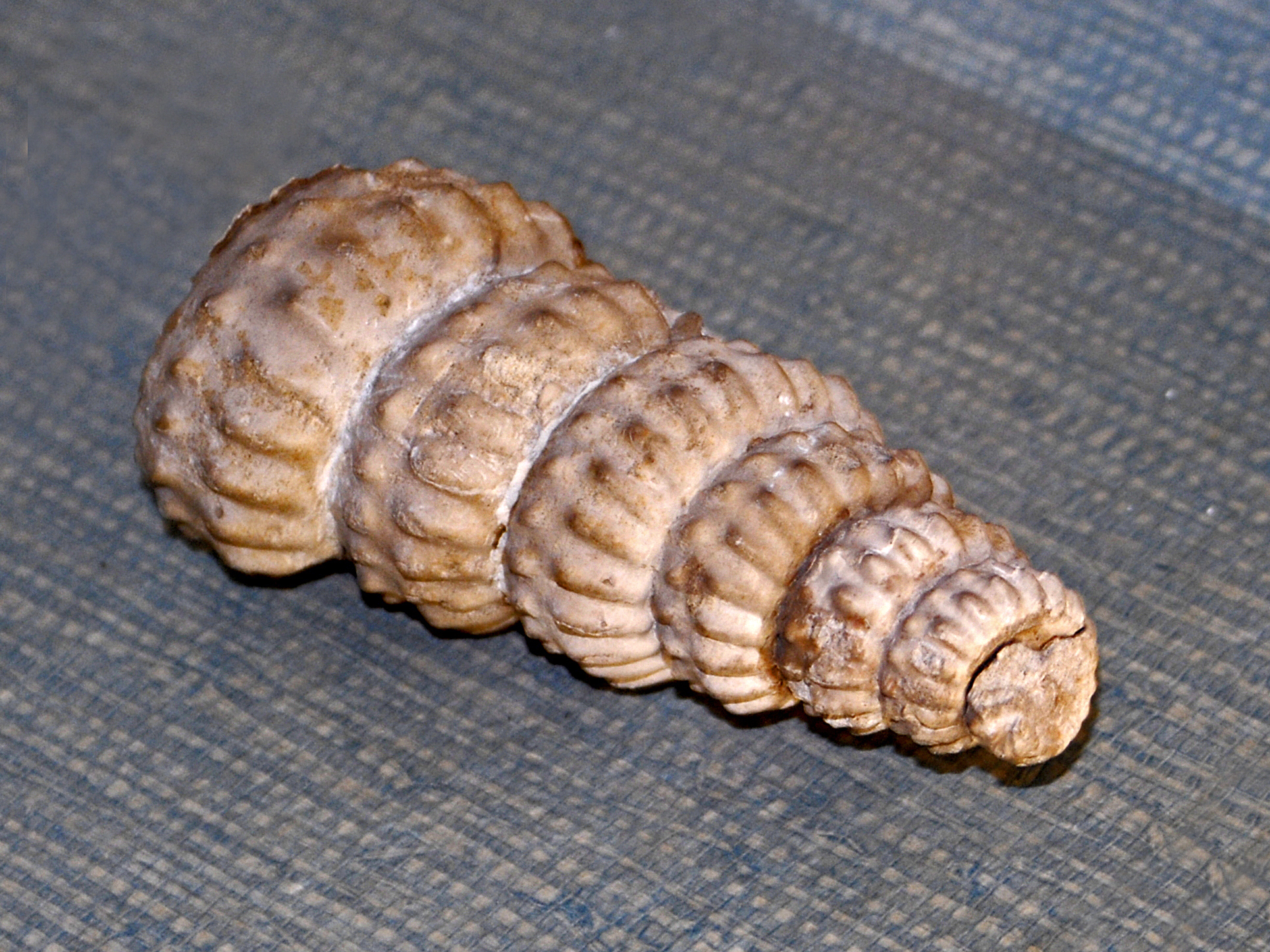
- Turrilites costatus from Rouen, France, on display at Galerie de paléontologie et d'anatomie comparée, Paris

Scientific classification
- Domain: Eukaryota
- Kingdom: Animalia
- Phylum: Mollusca
- Class: Cephalopoda
- Subclass: †Ammonoidea
- Order: †Ammonitida
- Suborder: †Ancyloceratina
- Family: †Turrilitidae
- Genus: †Turrilites; Lamarck, 1801

= Turrilites =

Turrilites Temporal range: Cenomanian–Turonian

Genus of molluscs (fossil)

Turrilites is a genus of helically coiled ammonoid cephalopods from the lower part of the Upper Cretaceous (Cenomanian and Turonian); generally included in the Ancyloceratina. Previously (Arkell, 1957) it was included in the ammonoid suborder, Lytoceratina.

The shell of Turrilites is tightly wound in a high trochospiral, with an acute angle at the apex. Ribs are weak to strong and may have 3 or 4 rows of equal numbers of tubercles. Thought to be derived from Mariella. Includes three subgenera.

== Subgenera and species ==
Turrilites has three subgenera.

- Turrilites (Turrilites) Lamarck, 1801
  - Turrilites (Turrilites) acutus Passy, 1832
  - Turrilites (Turrilites) costatus Lamarck, 1801
  - Turrilites (Turrilites) scheuchzerianus Bosc, 1801
- Turrilites (Euturrilites) Breistroffer, 1953
- Turrilites (Mesoturrilites)

Subgenus Turrilites has weak ribs and strong tubercles. Subgenus Euturrilites has strong ribs, commonly depressed in middle, especially on early whorls, and no tubercles. Subgenus Mesoturrilites has almost no ribs and clavate tubercles that tend to form spiral ridges.
