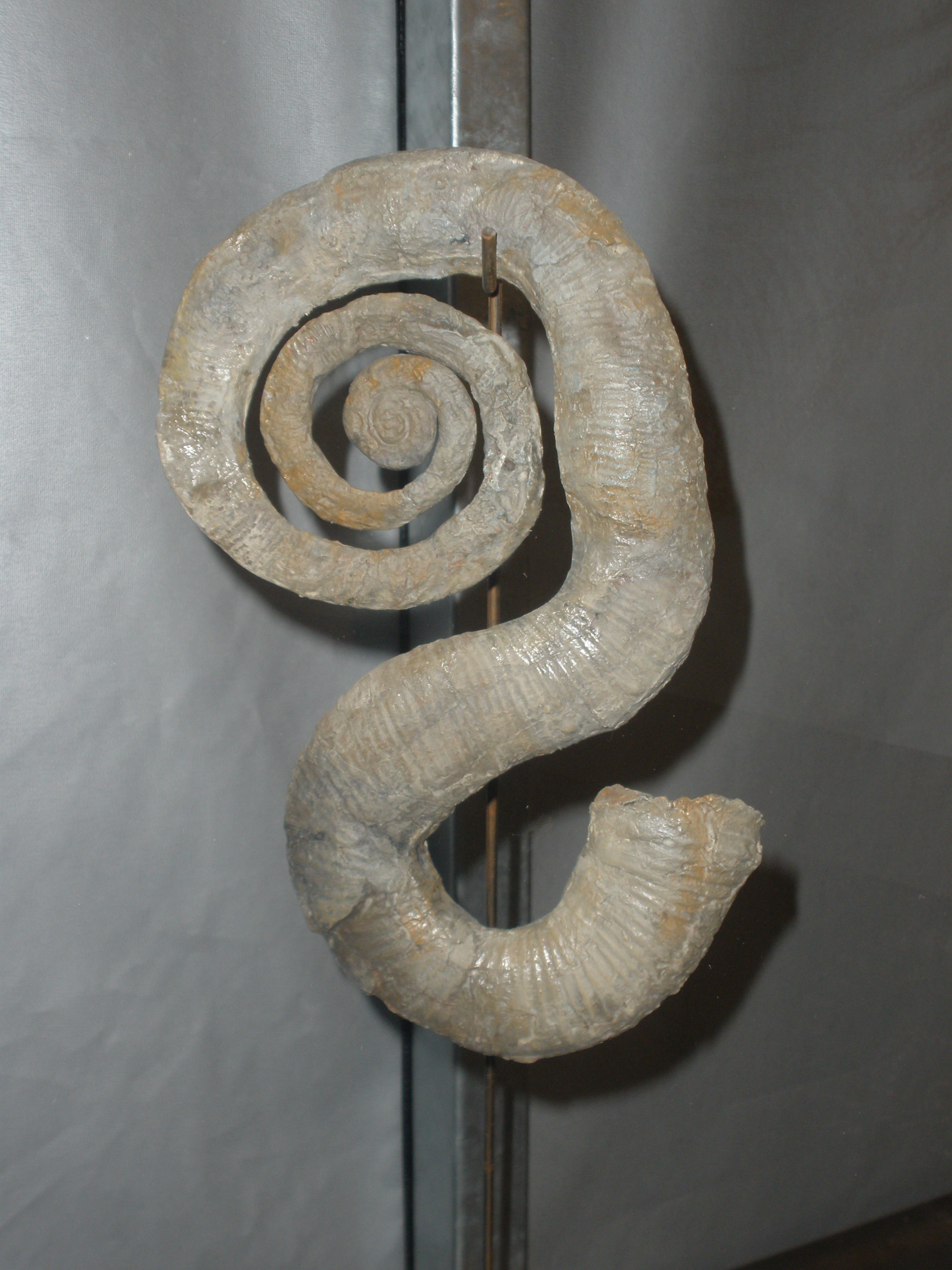

Scientific classification
- Domain: Eukaryota
- Kingdom: Animalia
- Phylum: Mollusca
- Class: Cephalopoda
- Subclass: †Ammonoidea
- Order: †Ammonitida
- Suborder: †Ancyloceratina
- Family: †Nostoceratidae
- Genus: †Pravitoceras; Yabe, 1901

= Pravitoceras =

Genus of molluscs (fossil)

Pravitoceras is an extinct genus of ammonites. They were fast-moving nektonic carnivores that existed from 84.9 to 70.6 million years ago in Japan.
