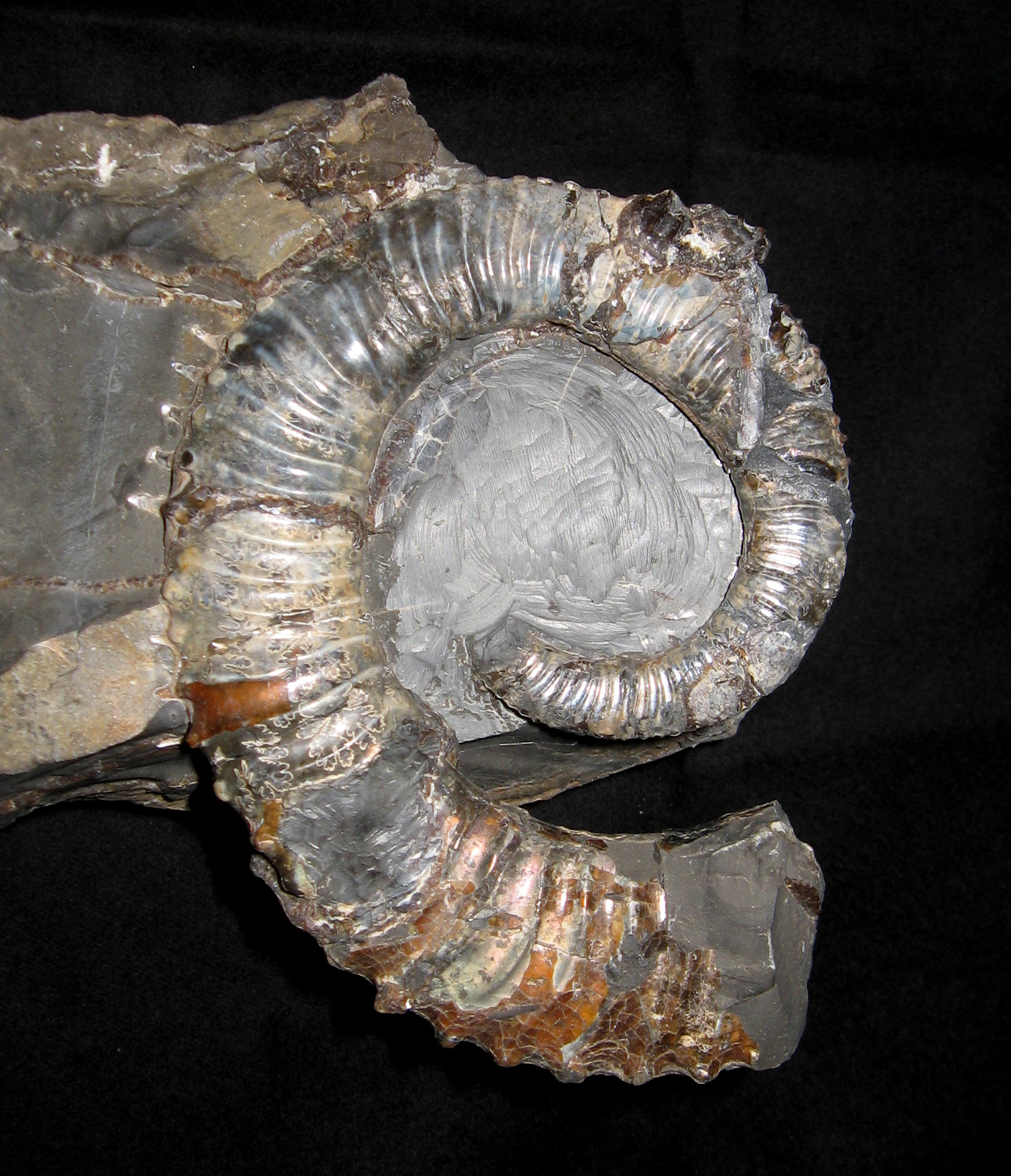
- Fossil specimen of Exiteloceras jenneyi

Scientific classification
- Domain: Eukaryota
- Kingdom: Animalia
- Phylum: Mollusca
- Class: Cephalopoda
- Subclass: †Ammonoidea
- Order: †Ammonitida
- Suborder: †Ancyloceratina
- Family: †Nostoceratidae
- Genus: †Exiteloceras; Hyatt, 1894

Species
- E. densicostatum; E. jenneyi

= Exiteloceras =

Exiteloceras Temporal range: Campanian–Maastrichtian

Genus of molluscs (fossil)

Exiteloceras is an ammonite genus from the Late Cretaceous.

Exiteloceras was proposed by Alpheus Hyatt in 1894 for heteromorph ammonites with shells that are loosely coiled in a plane, early whorls varying from straight limbs connected by semicircular elbows to elliptical or nearly circular loops, later whorls being elliptical to circular. The whorl section is ovate with the dorsum on the inside curve broader than the venter on the outside. The ribs may be straight or flexuous and mostly slant. Most end with a tubule on the ventrolateral shoulder. The suture is ammonitic. The deeply incised sutural elements are asymmetric, including the double-pronged ventral lobe.

== Distribution ==
Cretaceous of Egypt, Iraq, British Columbia, California, Colorado, Delaware, Montana, New Mexico, Wyoming.
