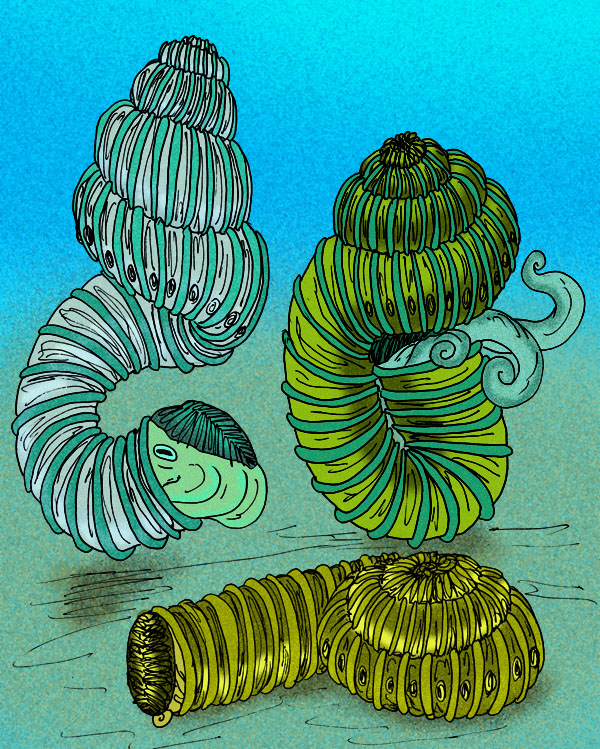

Scientific classification
- Kingdom: Animalia
- Phylum: Mollusca
- Class: Cephalopoda
- Subclass: †Ammonoidea
- Order: †Ammonitida
- Suborder: †Ancyloceratina
- Family: †Nostoceratidae
- Genus: †Nostoceras; Hyatt, 1894

Species
- List: N. adrotans; N. alternatus; N. approximans; N. arkanasanum; N. colubriformis; N. danei; N. draconis; N. helicinus; N. hyatti; N. kernense; N. mariatheresianum; N. mendryki; N. monotuberculatum; N. obtusum; N. pauper; N. pleurocostatum; N. pulcher; N. rotundum; N. saundersorum; N. splendidus; N. stantoni (type species)

= Nostoceras =

Nostoceras Temporal range: Campanian–Maastrichtian

Genus of molluscs (fossil)

Nostoceras is an extinct genus of ammonites. The genus name comes from Ancient Greek νόστος (nóstos), meaning "return", and κέρας (céras), meaning "horn", named as such by Alpheus Hyatt because the species' shell bends back on itself.

== Taxonomy ==
Nostoceras is the type genus for the ammonite family Nostoceratidae which is included in the Turrilitoidea. The Turrilitoidea, with Nostoceras and the Nostoceratidae, are commonly included in the suborder Ancyloceratina but may instead belong in the Turrilitina, a proposed order of heteromorphs thought to have a separate derivation, though this separation does not have wide support.

== Fossil record ==
Fossils of Nostoceras are found in marine strata from the Campanian stage of the Upper Cretaceous, in the USA, Mexico, Europe (England, the Netherlands, Austria, Belgium, Denmark, France, Germany, Spain, Italy), Tajikistan, Turkmenistan, Uzbekistan, Iraq, Oman, Africa (South Africa, Angola, Nigeria), Madagascar, Australia and Japan.

== Description ==
Nostoceras is typified by a tightly coiled helical spire on a large U-shaped body chamber with the aperture, in mature individuals, nearly touching and lying underneath the spire. The initial helical whorls are covered with fine ribs and may have small spines. The U-shaped body chamber has coarser ribbing and large tubercles. Periodic constrictions may be present on the phragmocone. Species may coil either to the left or to the right. Nostoceras is like Bostrychoceras in general form, except that its ribs may be flared and the constrictions may or may not be present.

Nostoceras hyatti could reach 90 mm in length.

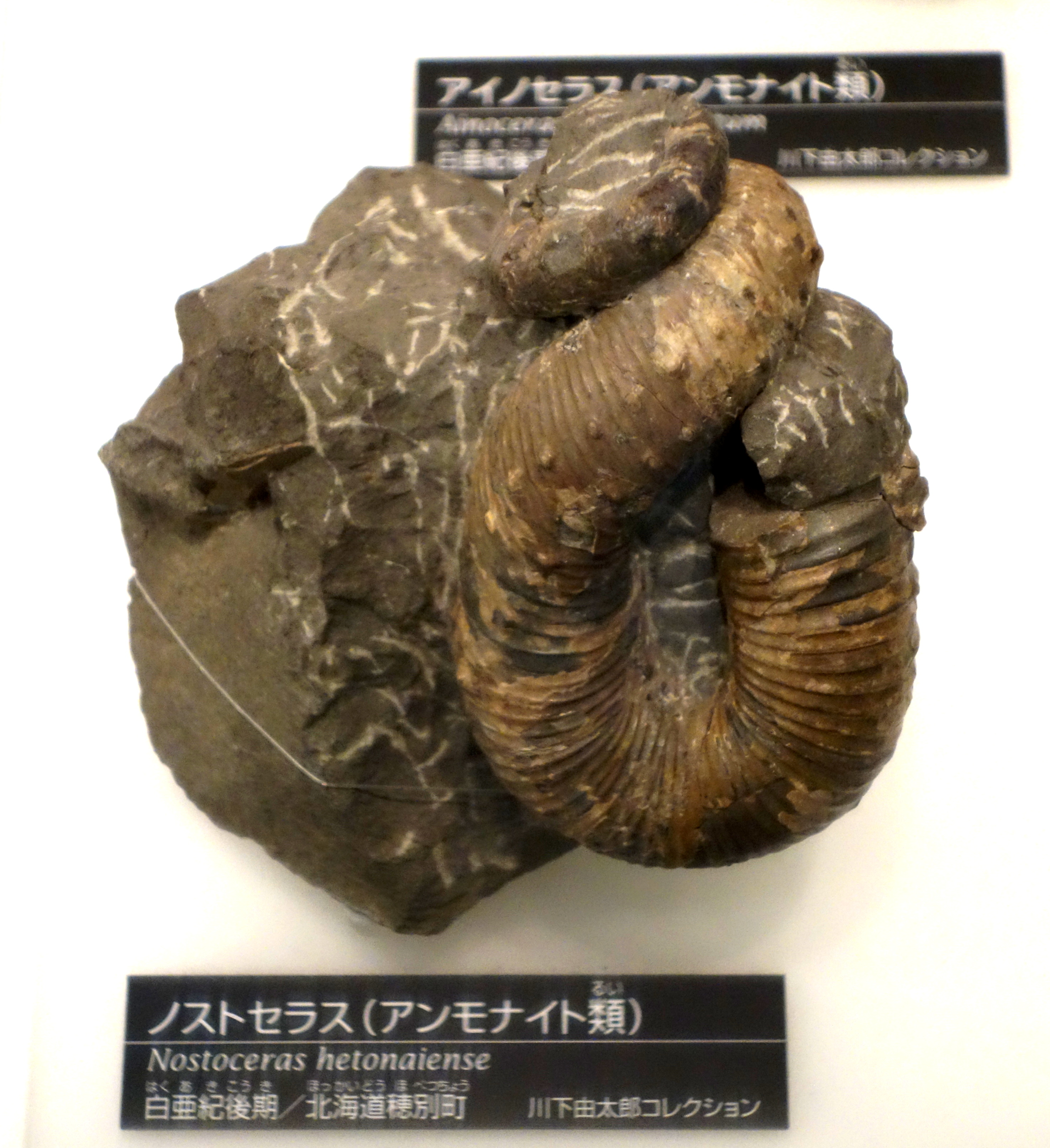
Nostoceras hetonaiense

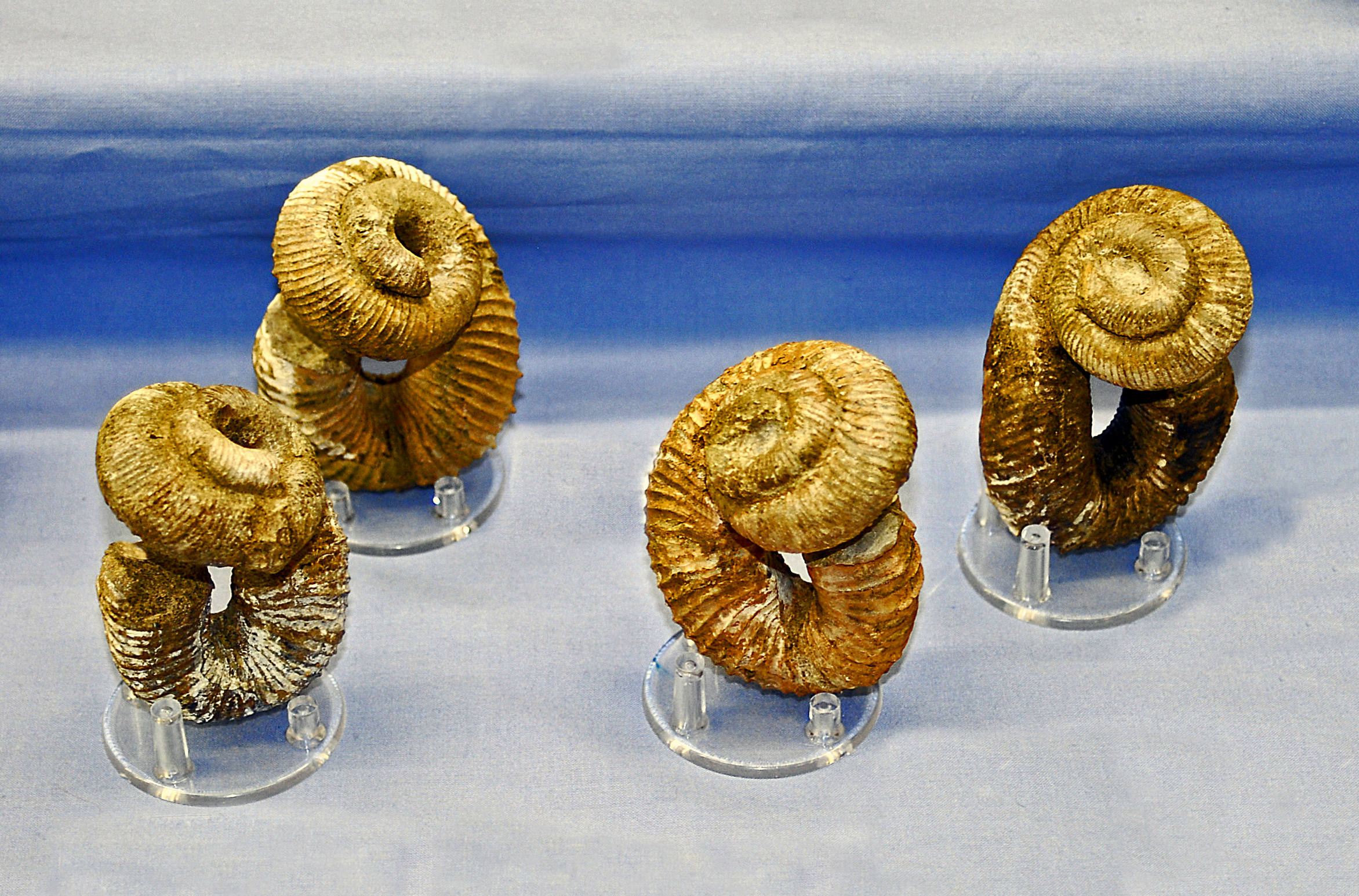
Fossils of Nostoceras malagasyense from Campanian of Tulear (Madagascar)

== Sources ==
Notes

Bibliography

- Arkell et al., 1957. Mesozoic Ammonoidea, Treatise on Invertebrate Paleontology, Part L. Geol Soc. of Amer. and Univ. Kans. press.
- Larson, Neal L. 2012. The Late Campanian (Upper Cretaceous) Cephalopod Fauna of the Coon Creek Formation at the Type Locality. The Journal of Paleontological Sciences: JPS.H.2012.01.
- A Pictorial Guide to Fossils by Gerard Ramon Case
