= Yezoites =

Yezoites Temporal range: Coniacian- Santonian

Scientific classification
- Domain: Eukaryota
- Kingdom: Animalia
- Phylum: Mollusca
- Class: Cephalopoda
- Subclass: †Ammonoidea
- Order: †Ammonitida
- Suborder: †Ancyloceratina
- Family: †Scaphitidae
- Subfamily: †Otoscaphitinae
- Genus: †Yezoites; Yabe, 1910

Species
- Y. bladenensis Schlüter, 1871; Y. orbignyi Kennedy, 1995; Y. planus Yabe, 1910; Y. puerculus Jimbo, 1894; Y. subevolutus Böse, 1928

Synonyms
- Otoscaphites Wright, 1953

Genus of molluscs (fossil)

Yezoites is an extinct genus of ammonites placed in the family Scaphitidae. The genus is known lived during the Upper Cretaceous and was first described in 1910. The genus contains five species, Y. bladenensis, Y. orbignyi, Y. planus, Y. puerculus, and Y. subevolutus.

Yezoites was first discovered in the Upper Cretaceous Yezo Group, Hokkaido, Japan and has since been identified in Antarctica, Denmark, France, Madagascar, and the United States. The shell has wide spaced ribbing.
