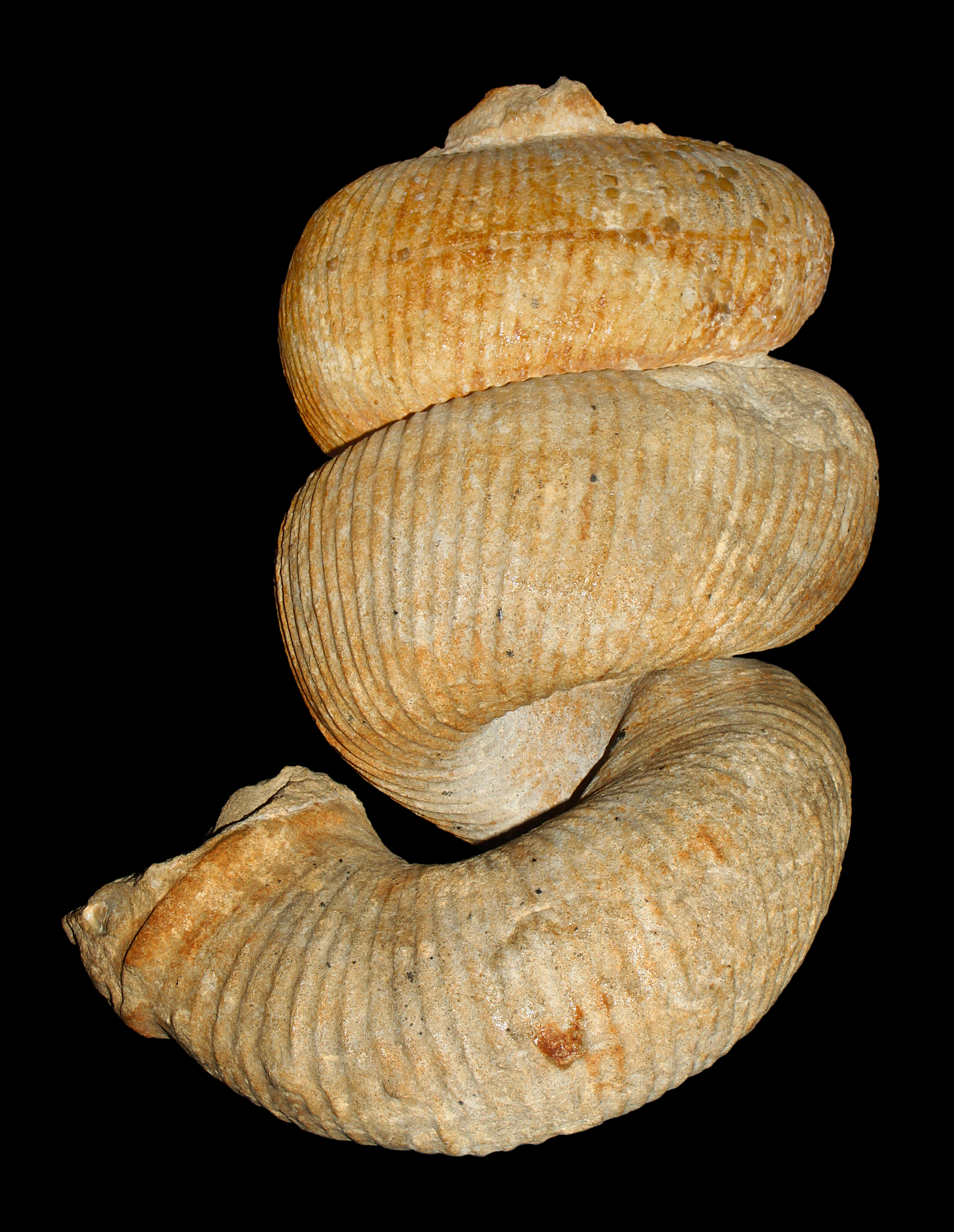

Scientific classification
- Domain: Eukaryota
- Kingdom: Animalia
- Phylum: Mollusca
- Class: Cephalopoda
- Subclass: †Ammonoidea
- Order: †Ammonitida
- Suborder: †Ancyloceratina
- Family: †Nostoceratidae
- Genus: †Bostrychoceras; Hyatt, 1900

Species
- None cataloged

= Bostrychoceras =

Bostrychoceras Temporal range: Campanian

Genus of molluscs (fossil)

Bostrychoceras is a genus of heteromorph ammonite from the family Nostoceratidae. Fossils have been found in Late Cretaceous sediments in Europe and North America.

The shell of Bostrychoceras begins as a tightly wound helical spire, like that of Nostoceras, from which hangs a U- or J-shaped body chamber, at least in the adult. The shell is covered with dense, strong, but unflared, ribs that are commonly sinuous and oblique. May nor may not have strong constrictions.

== Distribution ==
Cretaceous of Nigeria, Peru, South Africa, Spain and the United States
