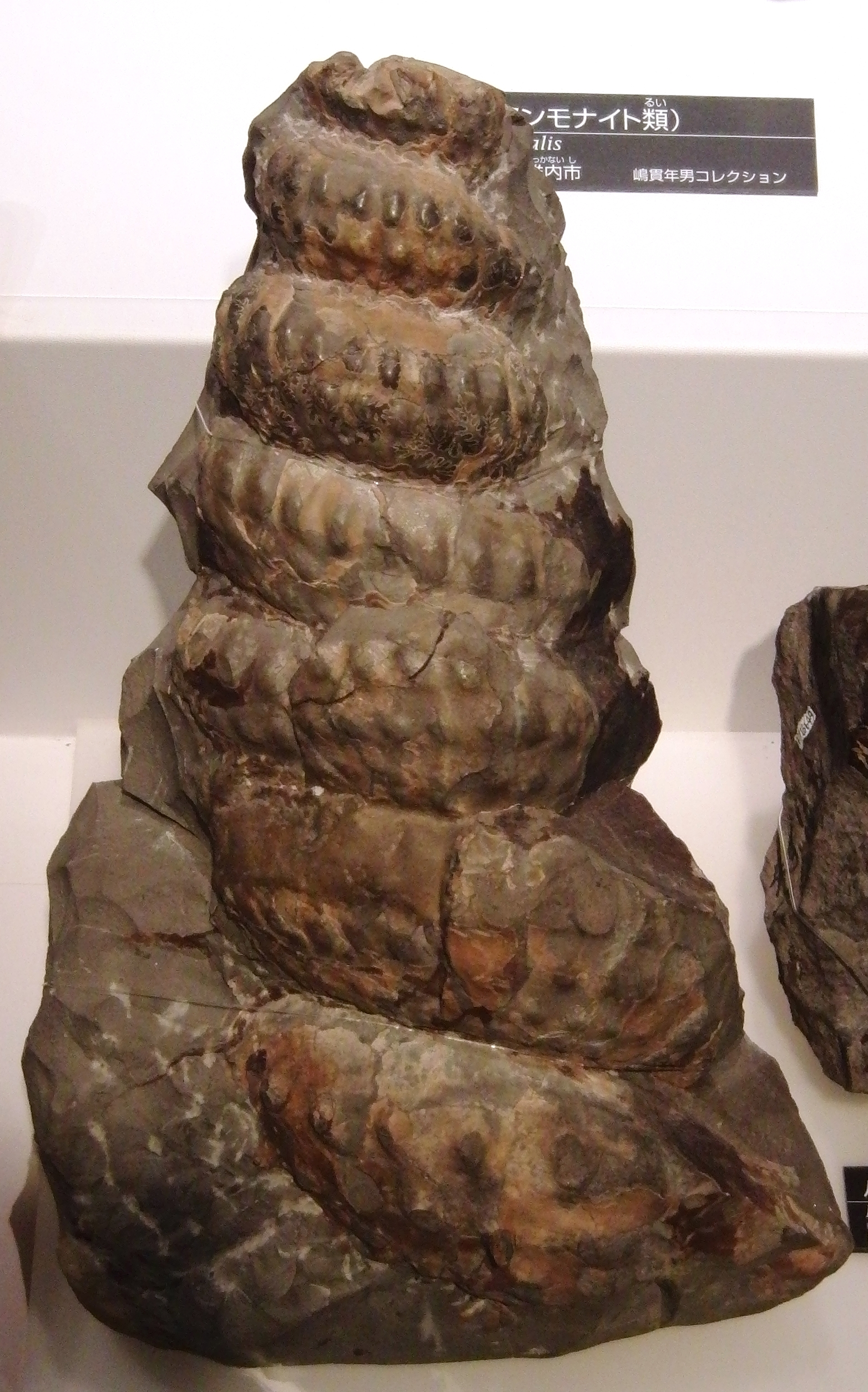
- Mariella lewesiensis from Japan. Late Cretaceous.

Scientific classification
- Kingdom: Animalia
- Phylum: Mollusca
- Class: Cephalopoda
- Subclass: †Ammonoidea
- Order: †Ammonitida
- Suborder: †Ancyloceratina
- Superfamily: †Turrilitoidea
- Family: †Turrilitidae; Meek, 1876

Type genus
- Turrilites Lamarck, 1801

Genera
- Heterocarinella; Mariella; Notostreptites; Ostlingoceras; Pseudhelicoceras; Tridenticeras; Turrilites

= Turrilitidae =

Turrilitidae Temporal range: 99.6–66 Ma Late Cretaceous

Extinct family of ammonites

Turrilitidae is a family of extinct heteromorph ammonite cephalopods. All members had shells that coiled helically that tended to resemble auger shells. The ecological roles turrilitids played is largely unknown, as experts are still speculating what niches they filled. Some are suspected of floating in the water column, while others, such as the eponymous Turrilites, are believed to have been bottom-dwellers. The name of the type genus Turrilites is a hybrid formation based on Latin turris "tower" and Greek lithos "stone", coined by Lamarck in 1801.

Although they were diverse and cosmopolitan, the turrilitids, along with all other ammonites, did not survive the Cretaceous–Paleogene extinction event.
