= List of ammonite genera =

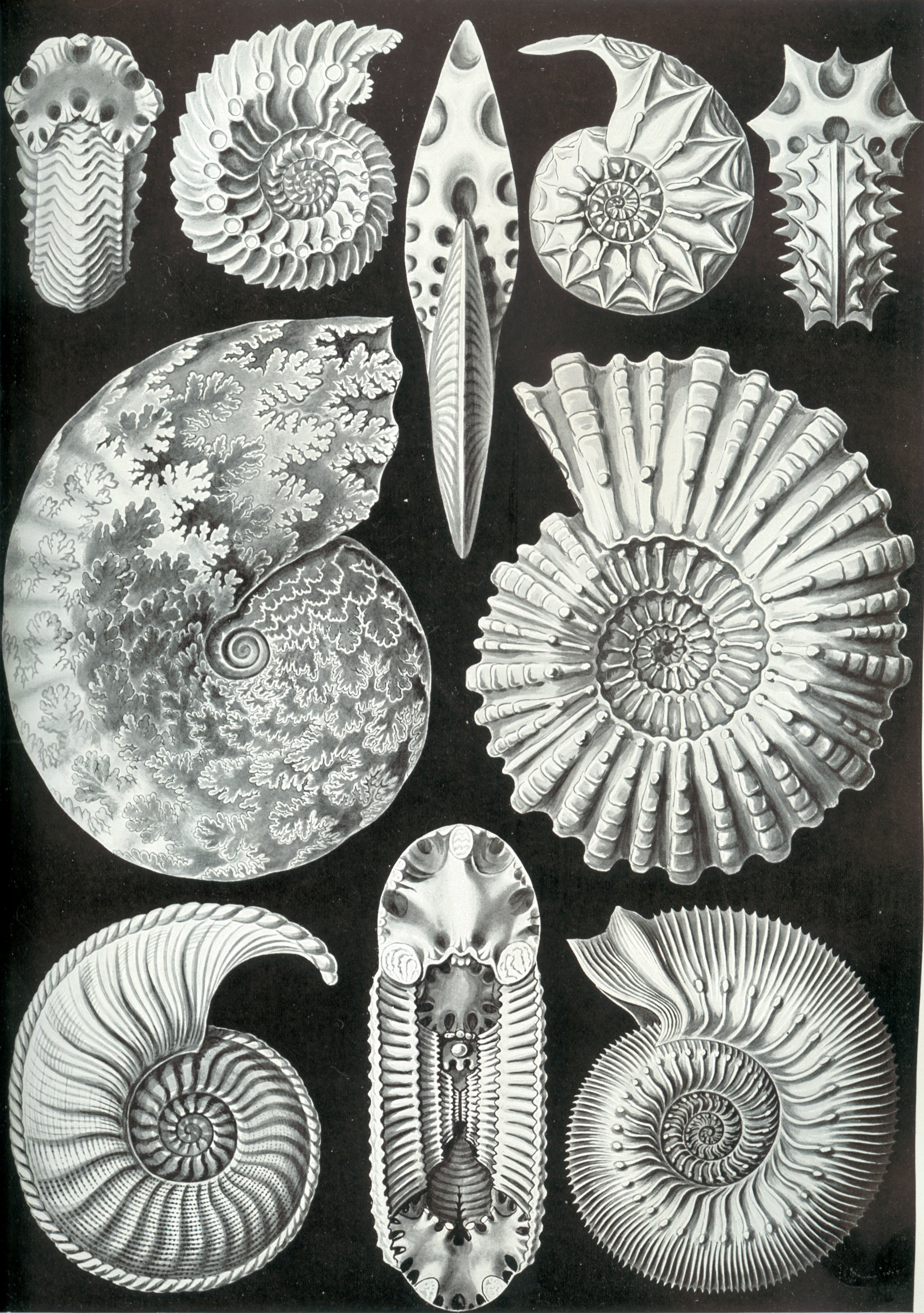
A variety of ammonite forms, from Ernst Haeckel's 1904 Kunstformen der Natur.

This list of ammonites is a comprehensive listing of genera that are included in the subclass †Ammonoidea, excluding purely vernacular terms. The list includes genera that are commonly accepted as valid, as well as those that may be invalid or doubtful (nomina dubia), or were not formally published (nomina nuda), as well as junior synonyms of more established names, and genera that are no longer considered ammonites.

Most of the generic names in this list come from Jack Sepkoski's 2002 compendium of marine fossil genera, which can be corroborated by other sources such as Part L, Ammonoidea, in the Treatise on Invertebrate Paleontology. Additional generic names included come from the Treatise or various peer review scientific journals.

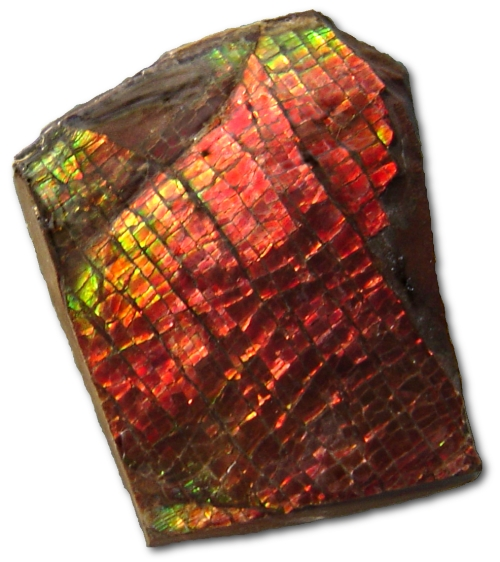
Ammolite is an iridescent gem stone made from the shells of fossil ammonites

== A ==
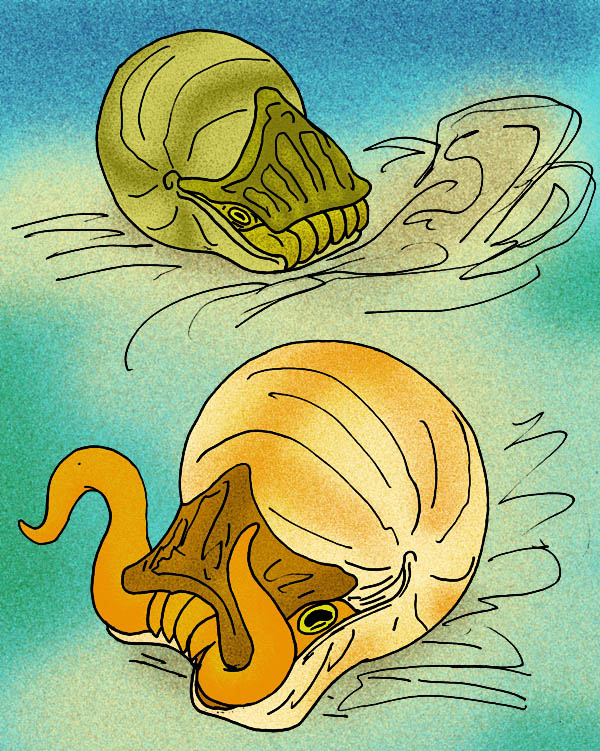
The Triassic ammonites Arcestes intuslabiatus (top) and A. binacostomus (bottom), from what is now Austria

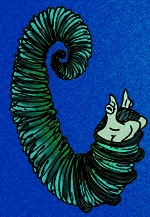
Reconstruction of Annuloceras summersi.

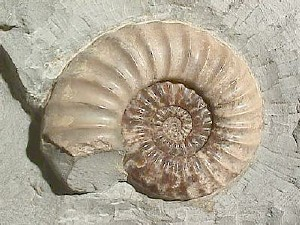
Asteroceras, a Jurassic ammonite from England.

=== Ab ===
- Abbasites
- Abichites
- Abrytasites

=== Ac ===
- Acanthaecites
- Acanthinites
- Acanthoceras
- Acanthoceratites
- Acanthoclymenia
- Acanthodiscus
- Acanthohoplites
- Acantholytoceras
- Acanthopleuroceras
- Acanthoplites
- Acanthoscaphites
- Accardia
- Achilleoceras
- Acompsoceras
- Aconeceras
- Acriclymenia
- Acrimeroceras
- Acrioceras
- Acrocanites
- Acrochordiceras
- Acuariceras
- Acuticostites
- Acutimitoceras

=== Ad ===
- Adkinsia
- Adkinsites
- Adnethiceras
- Adrianites

=== Ae ===
- Aegasteroceras
- Aegoceras
- Aegocrioceras
- Aegolytoceras
- Aenigmatoceras

=== Ag ===
- Agassiceras
- Agastrioceras
- Agathiceras
- Agoniatites

=== Ai ===
- Ainoceras
- Aioloceras

=== Ak ===
- Akmilleria
- Aktubinskia
- Aktubites
- Aktuboclymenia

=== Al ===
- Alanites
- Alaoceras
- Albanites
- Alcidellus
- Aldanites
- Alfeldites
- Algericeras
- Algerites
- Alligaticeras
- Alloceratites
- Alloclionites
- Allocrioceras
- Alloptychites
- Almites
- Almohadites
- Alocolytoceras
- Alpinites
- Alsatites
- Altudoceras
- Alurites

=== Am ===
- Amaltheus
- Amarassites
- Amauroceras
- Ambites
- Ammonellipsites
- Ammonitoceras
- Ammonoceratites
- Amoebites
- Amoeboceras
- Amorina
- Amphipoanoceras
- Amphistephanites
- Ampthillia

=== An ===
- Anacleoniceras
- Anadesmoceras
- Anaflemingites
- Anagaudryceras
- Anagymnites
- Anagymnotoceras
- Anahamulina
- Anahoplites
- Anaklinoceras
- Analytoceras
- Ananorites
- Anapachydiscus
- Anarcestes
- Anascaphites
- Anasibirites
- Anasirenites
- Anatibetites
- Anatomites
- Anatropites
- Anatsabites
- Anavirgatites
- Anaxenaspis
- Anclyoceras
- Ancolioceras
- Andersonites
- Anderssonoceras
- Andesites
- Andiceras
- Androgynoceras
- Anetoceras
- Aneuretoceras
- Anfaceras
- Anglesites
- Angranoceras
- Angulaticeras
- Anisarcestes
- Anisoceras
- Ankinatsytes
- Annuloceras
- Anolcites
- Anotoceras
- Antarcticoceras
- Anthracoceras
- Anthracoceratites
- Anthracoceratoides

=== Ap ===
- Aphantites
- Apleuroceras
- Aplococeras
- Apoderoceras
- Aposphinctoceras
- Apsorroceras

=== Aq ===
- Aquilonites

=== Ar ===
- Araneites
- Araxoceras
- Arcanoceras
- Arcestes
- Archoceras
- Arcthoplites
- Arcticoceras
- Arctocephalites
- Arctoceras
- Arctogymnites
- Arctohungarites
- Arctomeekoceras
- Arctomercaticeras
- Arctoprionites
- Arctoptychites
- Arctosirenites
- Arctotirolites
- Arestoceras
- Argentiniceras
- Argolites
- Argonauticeras
- Argosirenites
- Arianites
- Aricoceras
- Arieticeras
- Arietites
- Arietoceltites
- Arisphinctes
- Aristoceras
- Aristoceratoides
- Aristoptychites
- Arkanites
- Armatites
- Arnioceltites
- Arnioceras
- Arniotites
- Arpadites
- Arthaberites
- Artinksia
- Artioceras
- Artioceratoides

=== As ===
- Asaphoceras
- Asapholytoceras
- Asklepioceras
- Aspenites
- Asphinctites
- Aspidoceras
- Aspidostephanus
- Aspinoceras
- Asteroceras
- Asthenoceras
- Astiericeras
- Astieridiscus
- Astreptoceras
- Asturoceras

=== At ===
- Ataxioceras
- Atlantoceras
- Atsabites

=== Au ===
- Audaxlytoceras
- Audouliceras
- Augurites
- Aulacaganides
- Aulacosphinctes
- Aulacosphinctoides
- Aulacostephanus
- Aulasimoceras
- Aulatornoceras
- Austiniceras
- Australiceras
- Austroceratites
- Austrotrachyceras

=== Av ===
- Aveyroniceras

=== Ax ===
- Axinolobus
- Axonoceras

== B ==
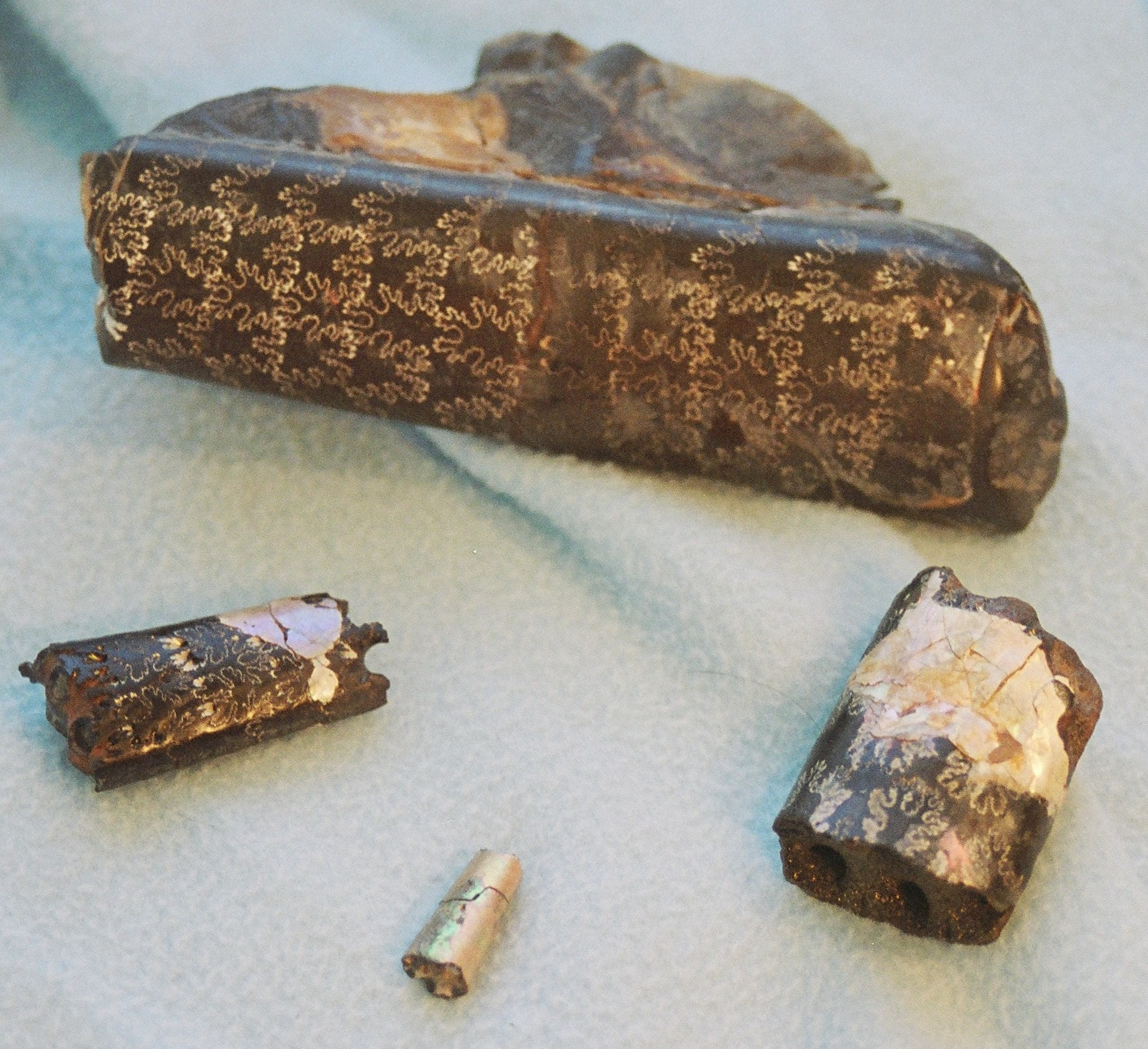
Fragmented fossil specimens of Baculites

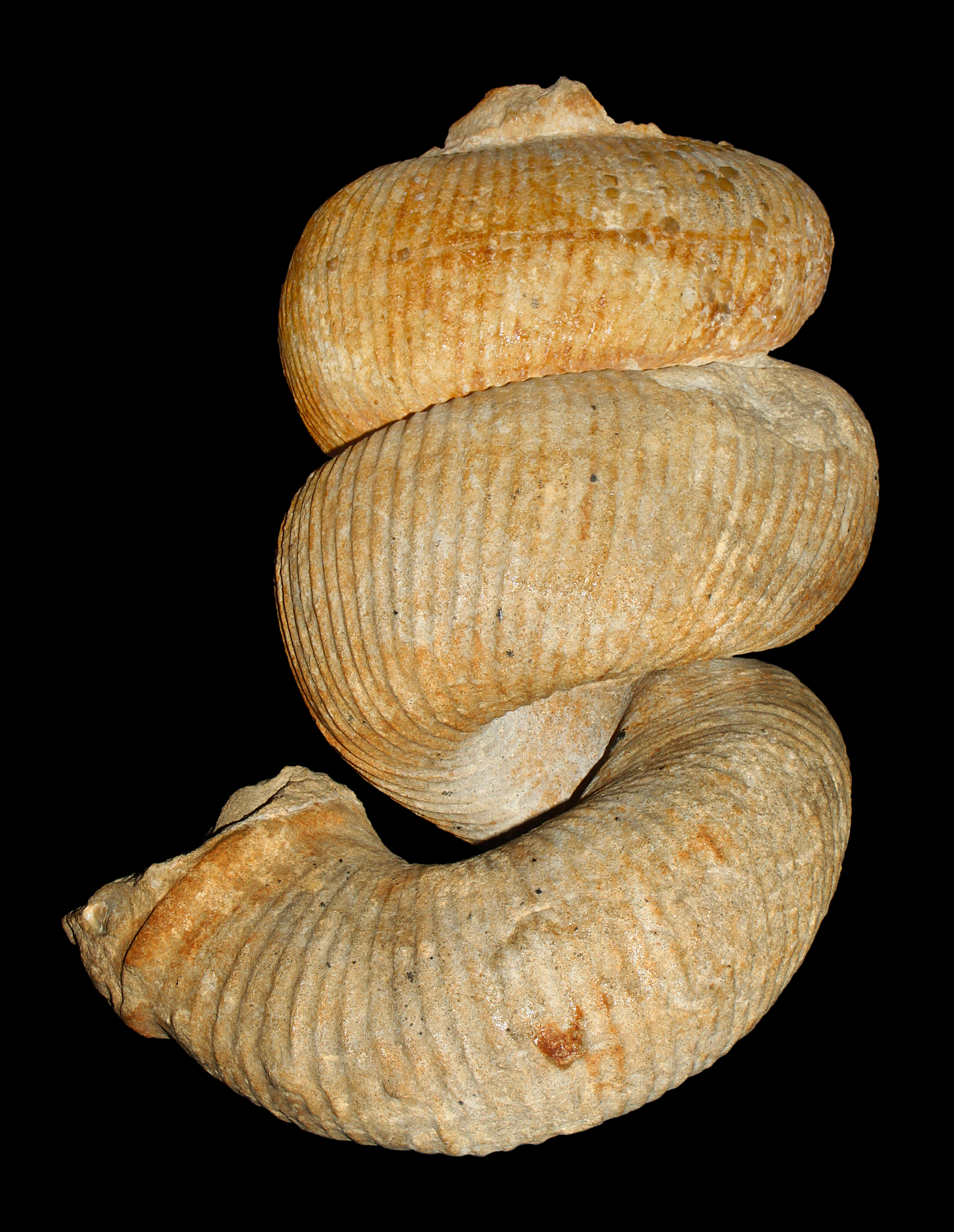
Bostrychoceras polyplocum

- Bacchites
- Bactrites
- Baculina
- Baculites
- Badiotites
- Bagnolites
- Balatonites
- Balearites
- Balkanites
- Balticeras
- Balvia
- Bamyaniceras
- Barguesiella
- Baronnites
- Barrandeites
- Barremites
- Barroisiceras
- Baschkirites
- Bashkortoceras
- Baskaniiceras
- Basleoceras
- Bastelia
- Bauchioceras
- Bayleites
- Beaniceras
- Beatites
- Behemoth
- Beleutoceras
- Beloceras
- Benacoceras
- Beneckeia
- Benueites
- Berbericeras
- Berniceras
- Berriasella
- Berrosiceras
- Betyokites
- Beudanticeras
- Beudantiella
- Bevahites
- Beyrichites
- Beyrichoceras
- Beyrichoceratoides
- Bhimaites
- Bifericeras
- Bigotites
- Bihenduloceras
- Bilinguites
- Billcobbanoceras
- Biloclymenia
- Biltnerites
- Binatisphinctes
- Binneyites
- Biplices
- Bisatoceras
- Blanfordiceras
- Bochianites
- Bodylevskites
- Boehmoceras
- Boesites
- Bogdanoceras
- Bollandites
- Bollandoceras
- Boreomeekoceras
- Borissjakoceras
- Borkinia
- Bornhardticeras
- Bosnites
- Bostrychoceras
- Boucaulticeras
- Bouleiceras
- Bradfordia
- Brahmaites
- Bramkampia
- Brancoceras
- Branneroceras
- Branneroceratoides
- Brasilia
- Bredyia
- Brevikites
- Brewericeras
- Brightia
- Brodieia
- Brotheotrachyceras — originally published as a subgenus of Trachyceras
- Brouwerites
- Buchiceras
- Budaiceras
- Buddhaites
- Bukowskiites
- Bullatimorphites
- Bulogites
- Bunburyiceras
- Burckhardites
- Burijites
- Busnardoites

== C ==
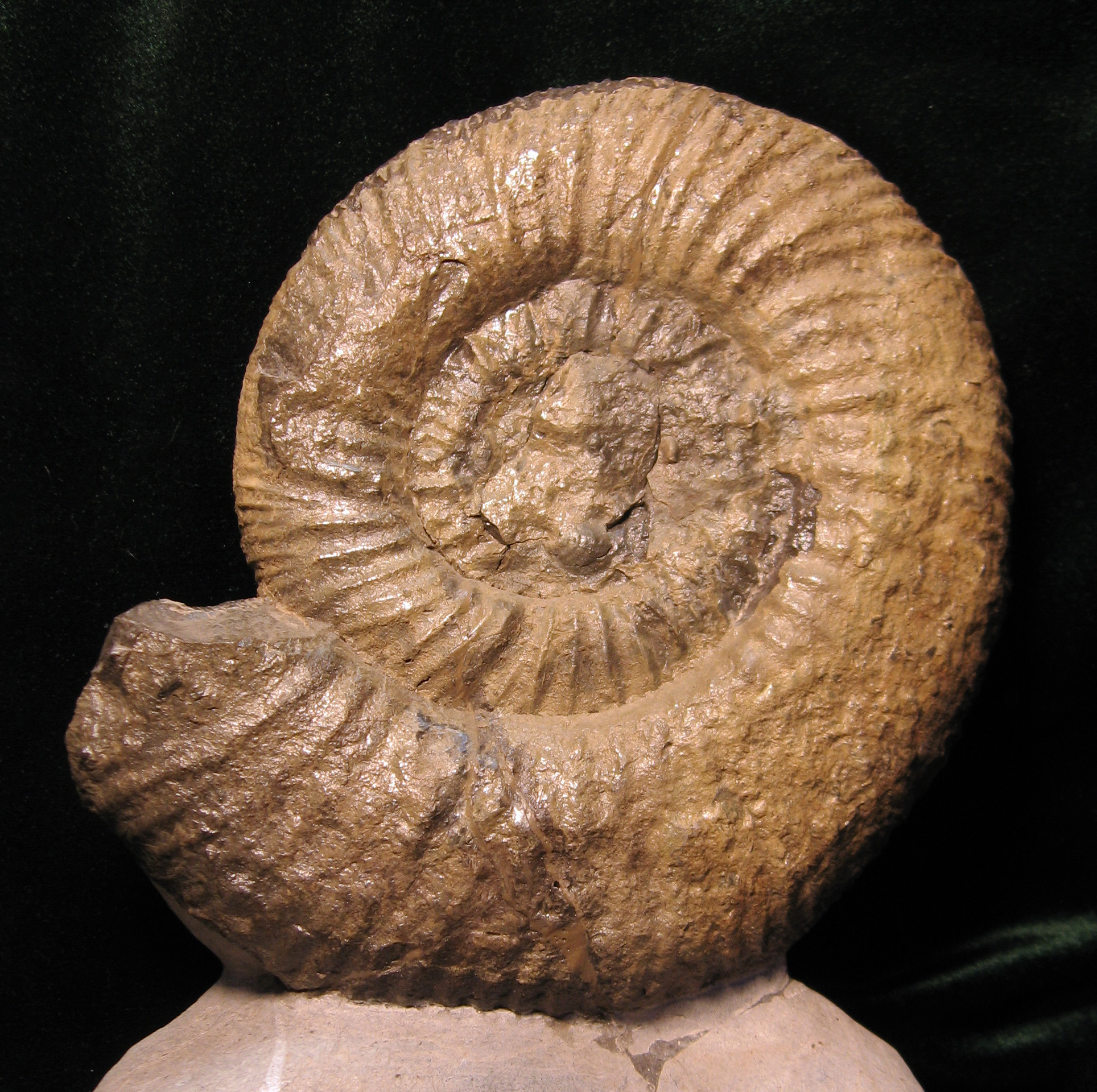
Cobbanites talkeetnanus

=== Ca ===
- Cabrievoceras
- Cadoceras
- Cadomites
- Cadomoceras
- Caenisites
- Caenocyclus
- Caenolyroceras
- Cainoceras
- Calaiceras
- Calanquites
- Californiceras
- Callihoplites
- Calliphylloceras
- Calliptychoceras
- Callizoniceras
- Caloceras
- Calycoceras
- Campylites
- Canadoceras
- Canavarella
- Canavaria
- Canavarites
- Cancelloceras
- Cantabricanites
- Cantabrigites
- Cardiella
- Cardioceras
- Carinoceras
- Carinoclymenia
- Carinophylloceras
- Carnites
- Carstenia
- Carthaginites
- Catacoeloceras
- Catasigaloceras
- Catulloceras
- Caucasites
- Caumontisphinctes
- Cavilentia

=== Ce ===
- Ceccaites
- Celaeceras
- Cenisella
- Ceratites
- Ceratpbeloceras
- Chamoussetia

=== Ch ===
- Chanasia
- Changhsingoceras
- Chartronia
- Cheiloceras
- Cheloniceras
- Cheltonia
- Chesapeakiceras
- Chetaites
- Chieseiceras
- Chioceras
- Chiotites
- Choffatia
- Choffaticeras
- Chondroceras
- Choristoceras
- Christioceras
- Christophoceras
- Chumazites

=== Ci ===
- Cibolaites
- Cibolites
- Cicatrites
- Cirroceras

=== Cl ===
- Cladiscites
- Clambites
- Cleistosphinctes
- Cleoniceras
- Cleviceras
- Clinolobus
- Clionitites
- Clioscaphites
- Clistoceras
- Cloioceras
- Cluthoceras
- Clydomphalites
- Clydoniceras
- Clydonites
- Clymenia
- Clymenoceras
- Clypeoceras

=== Co ===
- Coahuilites
- Cobbanites
- Cobbanoscaphites
- Cochleiferoceras
- Cochloceras
- Cochlocrioceras
- Coeloceltites
- Coeloceras
- Coeloderoceras
- Coilopoceras
- Colchidites
- Collectoceras
- Collignoniceras
- Collignonites
- Collina
- Collotia
- Colombiceras
- Coloradoscaphites
- Columbites
- Concavites
- Conlinoceras
- Constileioceras
- Convoluticeras
- Cordubiceras
- Coroceras
- Corongoceras
- Coroniceras
- Coronites
- Costaclymenia
- Costidiscus
- Costigymnites
- Costileioceras
- Costimitoceras
- Cottreauites
- Couloniceras
- Cowtoniceras

=== Cr ===
- Cranocephalites
- Craspedites
- Craspedodiscus
- Crassiceras
- Crassiplanulites
- Crassotornoceras
- Cravenites
- Cravenoceras
- Cravenoceratoides
- Creniceras
- Crickites
- Crimites
- Crioceras
- Crioceratites
- Cruasiceras
- Crucilobiceras
- Crussoliceras
- Cryptoclymenia
- Cryptotexanites

=== Ct ===
- Ctenobactrites
- Cteroclymenia

=== Cu ===
- Cubaochetoceras
- Cuccoceras
- Cuneicardioceras
- Cunitoceras
- Cunningtoniceras
- Cutchisphinctes
- Cuyaniceras

=== Cy ===
- Cyclobactrites
- Cycloceltites
- Cyclolobus
- Cycloclymenia
- Cylioceras
- Cymaceras
- Cymaclymenia
- Cymahoplites
- Cymbites
- Cymoceras
- Cyrtobactrites
- Cyrtochilus
- Cyrtoclymenia
- Cyrtopleurites
- Cyrtosiceras

=== Cz ===
- Czekanowskites

== D ==
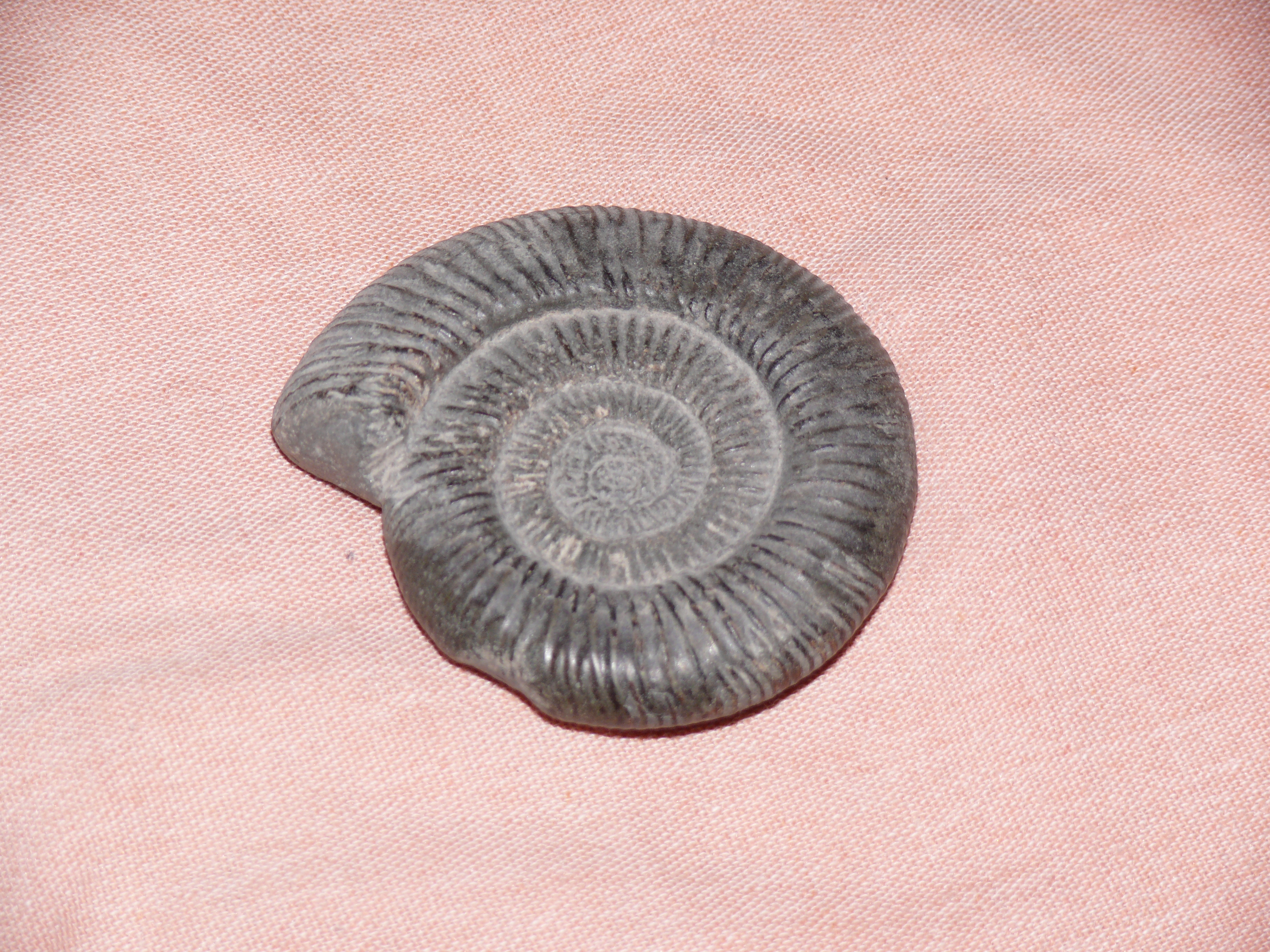
Dactylioceras fossil.

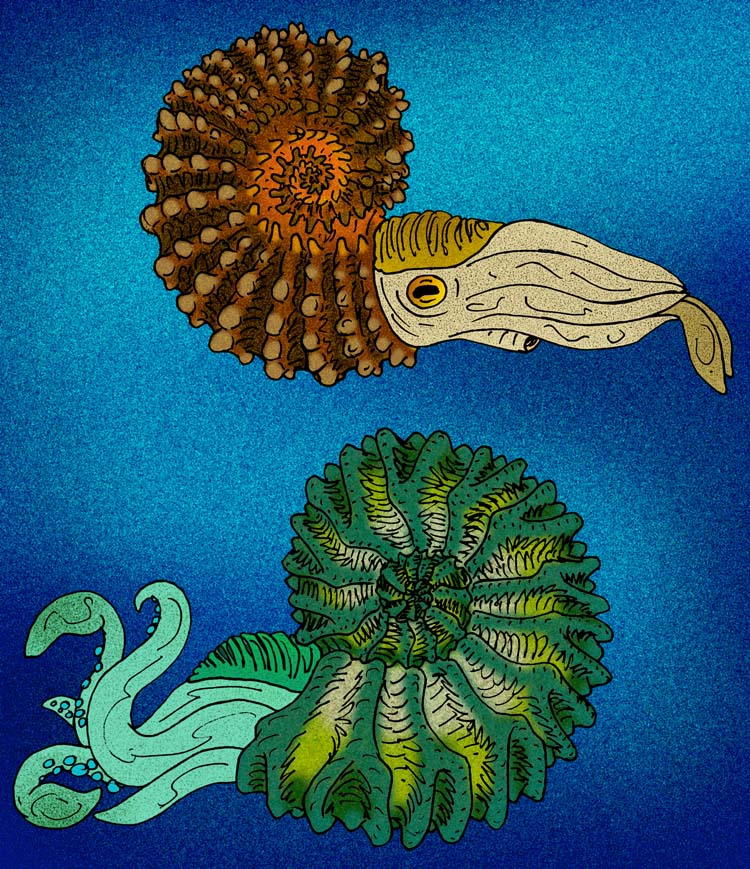
Douvilleiceras and Hoplites were French ammonites that lived during the Early Cretaceous.

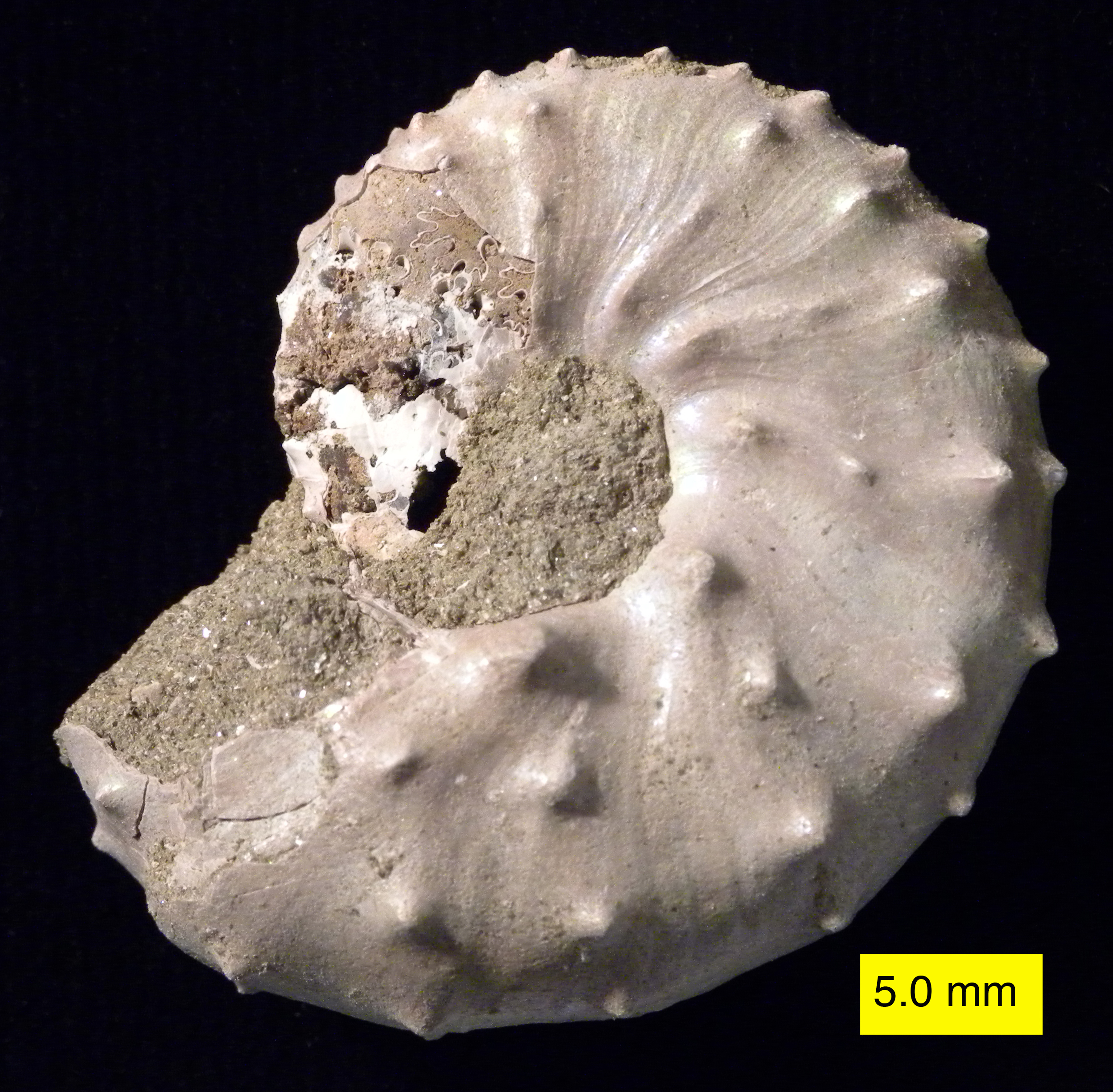
Discoscaphites iris

=== Da ===
- Dactylioceras
- Dagnoceras
- Daixites
- Dalmasiceras
- Dalmatites
- Damaisiceras
- Damesiceras
- Damesites
- Danubisphinctes
- Danubites
- Daphnites
- Daraelites
- Darellia
- Darvasiceras
- Dasyceras
- Daxatina
- Dayiceras

=== De ===
- Decipia
- Decorites
- Deiradoceras
- Delecticeras
- Delepinoceras
- Delphinites
- Demarezites
- Derolytoceras
- Deshayesites
- Desmoceras
- Desmophyllites
- Desmoscaphites
- Devonobactrites
- Devonopronorites

=== Dh ===
- Dhosaites
- Dhrumaites

=== Di ===
- Diaboloceras
- Diadochoceras
- Diamanticeras
- Diaplococeras
- Diaziceras
- Dichotomites
- Dichotomoceras
- Dichotomosphinctes
- Dickersonia
- Dicostella
- Didymites
- Didymoceras
- Dieneria
- Difuntites
- Digitophyllites
- Dilatobactrites
- Dimeroceras
- Dimeroclymenia
- Dimorphinites
- Dimorphites
- Dimorphoceras
- Dimorphoceratoides
- Dimorphoplites
- Dimorphotoceras
- Dinarites
- Diodochoceras
- Dionites
- Diplacmoceras
- Diplasioceras
- Diplesioceras
- Diplomoceras
- Diplosirenites
- Dipoloceras
- Dipoloceroides
- Dirrymoceras
- Discoceratites
- Discoclymenia
- Discohoplites
- Discophiceras
- Discophyllites
- Discoptychites
- Discoscaphites
- Discosphinctes
- Discosphinctoides
- Discotropites
- Distichites
- Distichoceras
- Distoloceras
- Dittmarites
- Divisosphinctes

=== Dj ===
- Djurjuriceras

=== Do ===
- Dobrodgeiceras
- Dobrogeites
- Docidoceras
- Dolikephalites
- Domanikoceras
- Dombarigloria
- Dombarites
- Dombarocanites
- Donetzoceras
- Dorikranites
- Dorsetensia
- Dorsoplanites
- Dorsomorphites
- Doryceras
- Doubichites
- Doulingoceras
- Douvilleiceras

=== Dr ===
- Drepanites
- Drumoceras

=== Du ===
- Duashnoceras
- Dufrenoyia
- Dumortieria
- Dunbarites
- Dunedinites
- Dunveganoceras
- Durangites
- Durotrigensia
- Durvilleoceras

=== Dy ===
- Dyscheiloceras

=== Dz ===
- Dzhaprakoceras
- Dzhulfoceras

== E ==
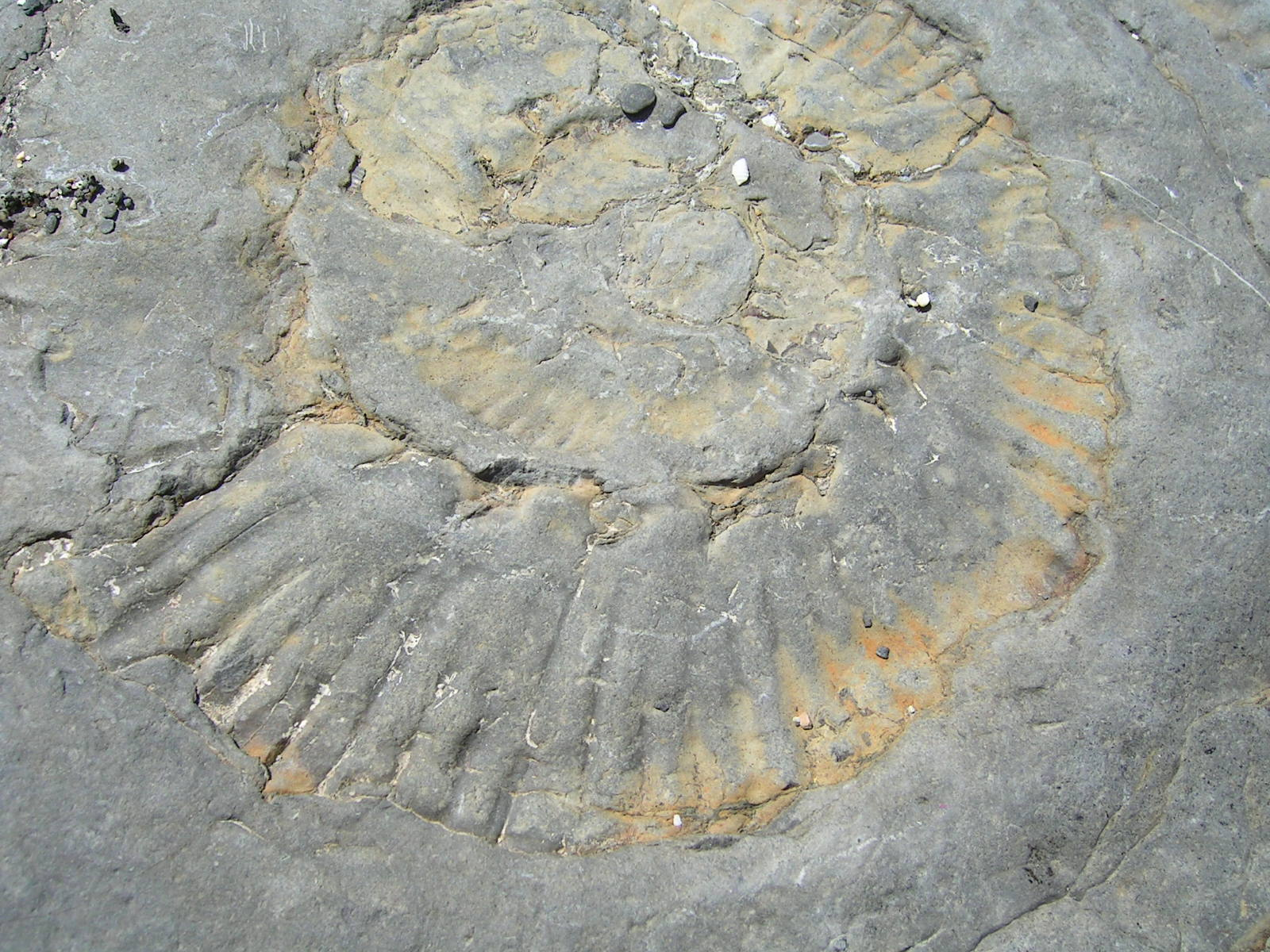
An ammonite fossil.

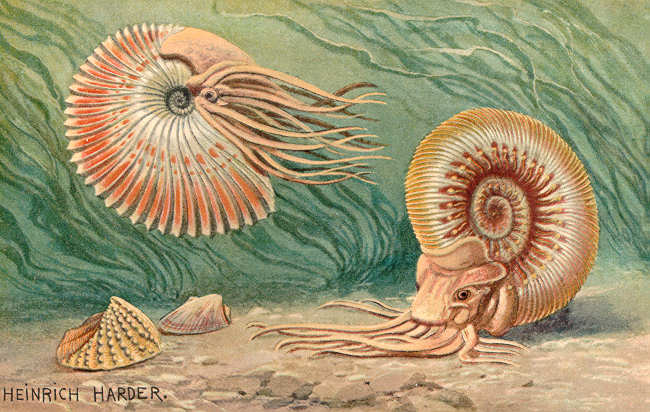
Paleoartist Heinrich Harder's reconstruction of some ammonites as they would appear in life.

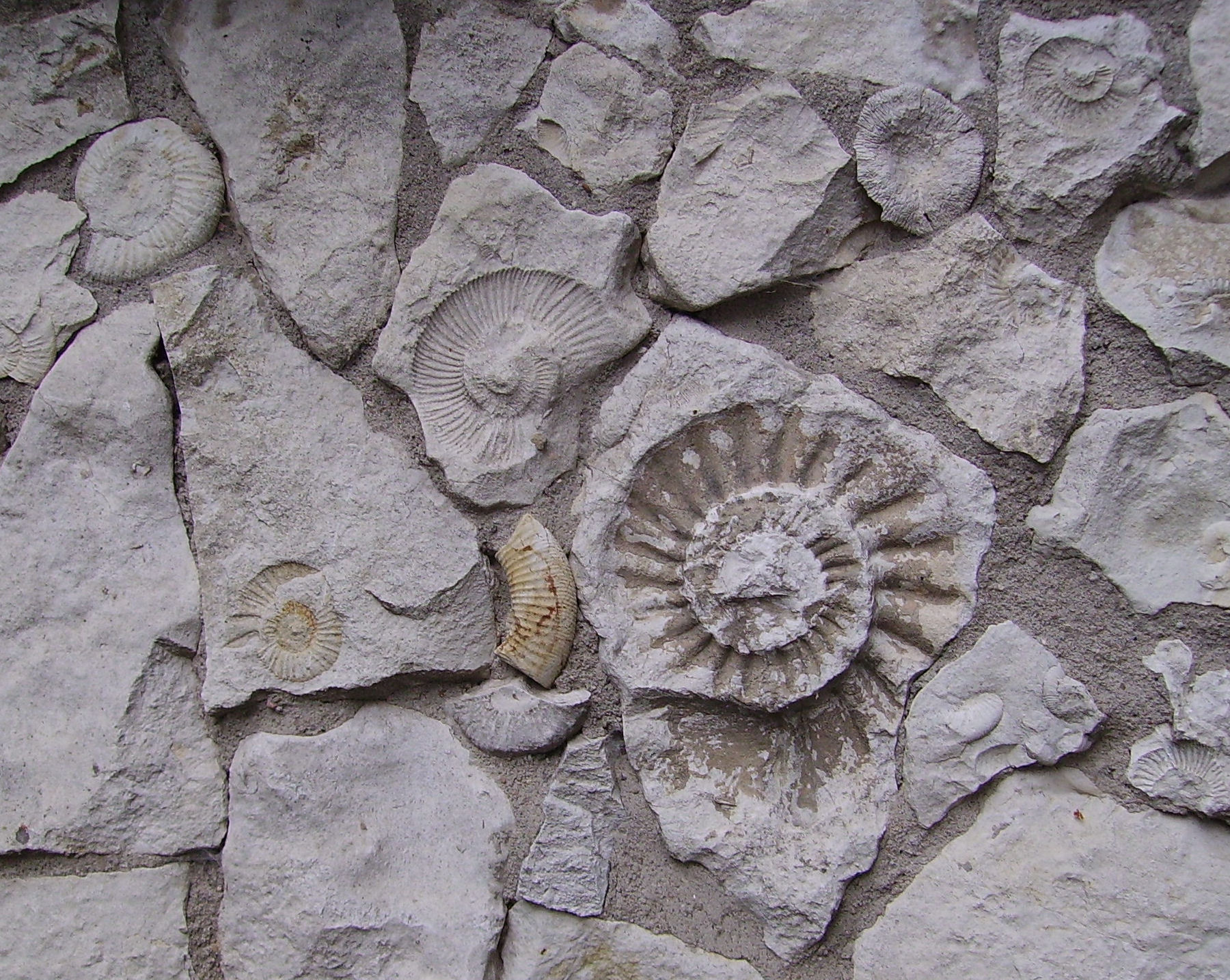
A stone pathway constructed with many ammonite specimens.

- Eboraciceras
- Eboroceras
- Ebrayiceras
- Echioceratoides
- Echioceras
- Ectocentrites
- Ectolcites
- Edmundites
- Egrabensiceras
- Eleganticeras
- Elephantoceras
- Ellipsoceras
- Elobiceras
- Emaciaticeras
- Emileia
- Emilites
- Emperoceras
- Enayites
- Engonoceras
- Enosphinctes
- Entogonites
- Eoacrochordiceras
- Eoaraxoceras
- Eoasianites
- Eobeloceras
- Eocanites
- Eocephalites
- Eochetoceras
- Eocrioceratites
- Eodanubites
- Eoderoceras
- Eodesmoceras
- Eodouvilleiceras
- Eogaudryceras
- Eogonioloboceras
- Eogunnarites
- Eogymnites
- Eohecticoceras
- Eoheteroceras
- Eohyattoceras
- Eomadrasites
- Eonomismoceras
- Eopachydiscus
- Eoparalegoceras
- Eophyllites
- Eoprodromites
- Eoprotrachyceras
- Eopsiloceras
- Eosagenites
- Eoscaphites
- Eoschistoceras
- Eosturia
- Eotetragonites
- Eothalassoceras
- Eothinites
- Eotissotia
- Eowellerites
- Epacrochordiceras
- Epadrianites
- Epancyloceras
- Eparietites
- Epaspidoceras
- Epicanites
- Epiceltites
- Epiceltitoides
- Epicephalites
- Epiceratites
- Epicheloniceras
- Epicosmoceras
- Epideroceras
- Epiglyphioceras
- Epiglyptoxoceras
- Epigonites
- Epigymnites
- Epihoplites
- Epijuresanites
- Epileymeriella
- Epimayaites
- Epimorphoceras
- Epipallasiceras
- Epipeltoceras
- Episageceras
- Episculites
- Epistrenoceras
- Epitauroceras
- Epithalassoceras
- Epitornoceras
- Epivirgatites
- Epiwocklumeria
- Epophioceras
- Erbenoceras
- Eremites
- Erinoceras
- Erioliceras
- Eristavites
- Ermoceras
- Erycites
- Erymnoceras
- Erymnocerites
- Esericeras
- Euagassiceras
- Euaptetoceras
- Euaspidoceras
- Eubaculites
- Eubostrychoceras
- Eubranoceras
- Eucalycoceras
- Eucoroniceras
- Eucycloceras
- Eudiscoceras
- Eudmetoceras
- Euflemingites
- Euhoplites
- Euhoploceras
- Euhystrichoceras
- Euisculites
- Eulophoceras
- Eulytoceras
- Eumedlicottia
- Eumorphoceras
- Euomphaloceras
- Eupachydiscus
- Euphylloceras
- Eupinacoceras
- Eupleuroceras
- Euprionoceras
- Euptychoceras
- Eurites
- Euroceras
- Eurycephalites
- Eurynoticeras
- Eusagenites
- Eutomoceras
- Euturrilites
- Exiteloceras
- Exotornoceras
- Ezilloella

== F ==
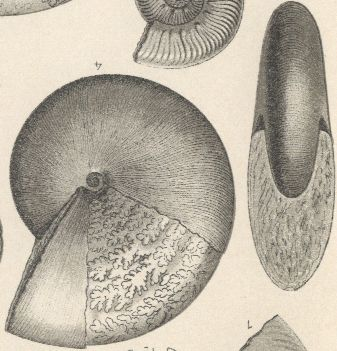
A pencil drawing of an ammonite fossil. Ammonitic sutures are visible for part of the shell's length.

- Fagesia
- Falciclymenia
- Falciferella
- Falcitornoceras
- Fallacites
- Falloticeras
- Fanninoceras
- Farbesiceras
- Farnhamia
- Fascipericyclus
- Favrella
- Fayettevillea
- Fehlmannites
- Ferganoceras
- Ficheuria
- Fikaites
- Finiclymenia
- Fissilobiceras
- Flabellisphinctes
- Flemingites
- Flexiclymenia
- Flexispinites
- Flexoptychites
- Flickia
- Fontanelliceras
- Fontannesia
- Fontannesiella
- Foordites
- Forbesiceras
- Forresteria
- Fournierella
- Frankites
- Frechiella
- Frechites
- Frenguelliceras
- Fresvillia
- Frogdenites
- Fuciniceras
- Funiferites

== G ==
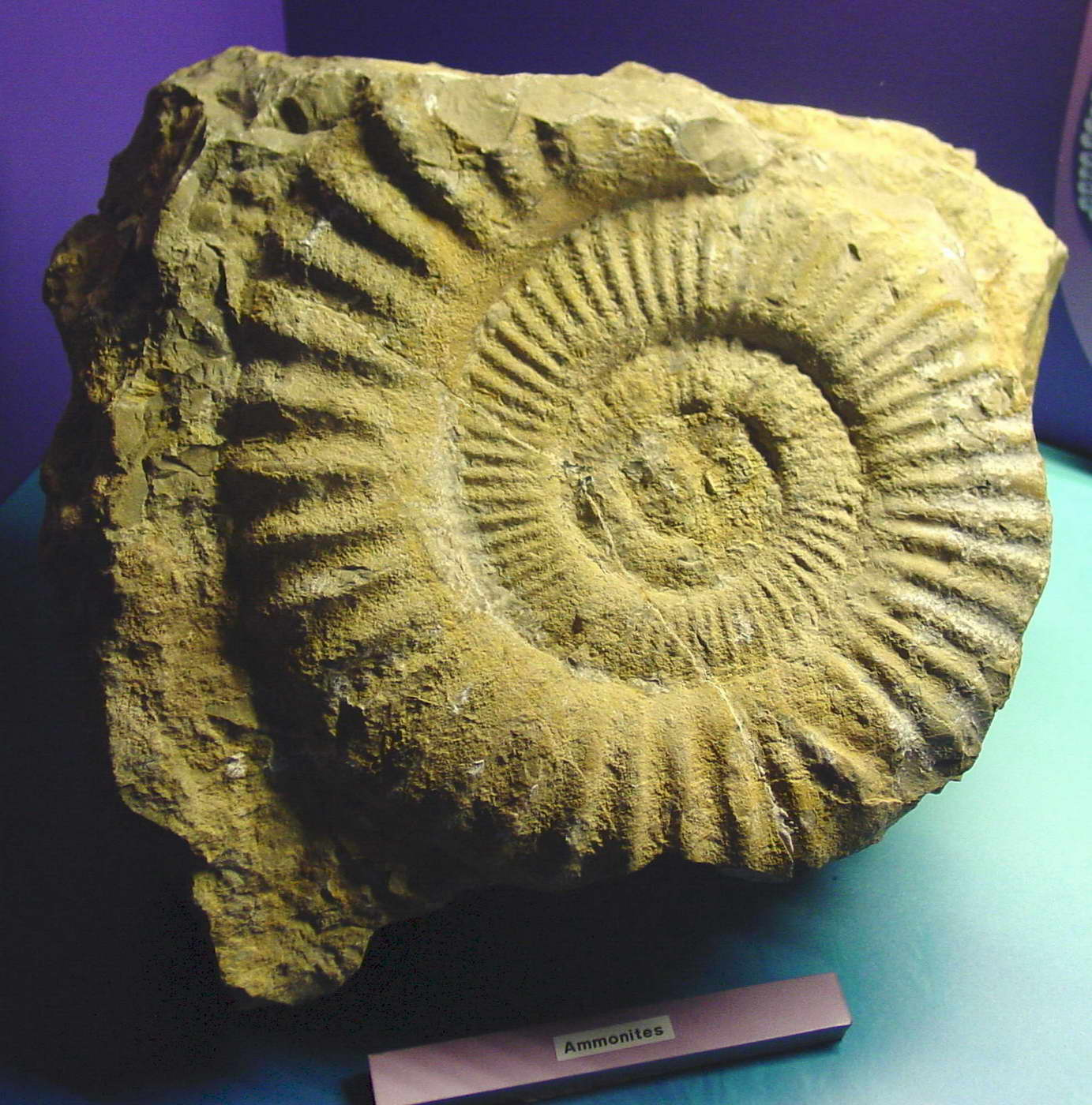
An ammonite from Spain.

- Gabbioceras
- Gabillytes
- Gaetanoceras
- Gagaticeras
- Gaitherites
- Galaticeras
- Galbanites
- Gangadharites
- Garantiana
- Gargasiceras
- Garniericeras
- Garnierisphinctes
- Garroniceras
- Gastrioceras
- Gastroplites
- Gattendorfia
- Gattenpleura
- Gaudryceras
- Gaurites
- Gauthiericeras
- Gazdaganites
- Gemmellaroceras
- Gentoniceras
- Genuclymenia
- Georgioceras
- Germariceras
- Gevanites
- Geyeroceras
- Giovaraites
- Girtyoceras
- Glabrophysodoceras
- Glamocites
- Glaphyrites
- Glassoceras
- Glatziella
- Glaucolithites
- Gleboceras
- Gleviceras
- Glochiceras
- Glottoptychinites
- Glyphidites
- Glyphiolobus
- Glyptarpites
- Glyptoceras
- Glyptoxoceras
- Gnomohalorites
- Gogoceras
- Goliathiceras
- Goliathites
- Goniatites
- Gonioclymenia
- Goniocyclus
- Gonioglyphioceras
- Gonioloboceras
- Gonioloboceratoides
- Gonionotites
- Gonolkites
- Goodhallites
- Gracilisphinctes
- Gracilites
- Grambergia
- Grammoceras
- Grandidiericeras
- Graphoceras
- Gravesia
- Grayiceras
- Graysonites
- Gregoryceras
- Griesbachites
- Groebericeras
- Groenlandites
- Grossouvria
- Grossouvrites
- Guembelites
- Guhsania
- Guleilmites
- Guleimiceras
- Gulielmina
- Gulielmites
- Gunnarites
- Gyaloceras
- Gymnites
- Gymnodiscoceras
- Gymnoplites
- Gymnotoceras
- Gymnotropites
- Gyroceratites
- Gyroclymenia
- Gyronites

== H ==
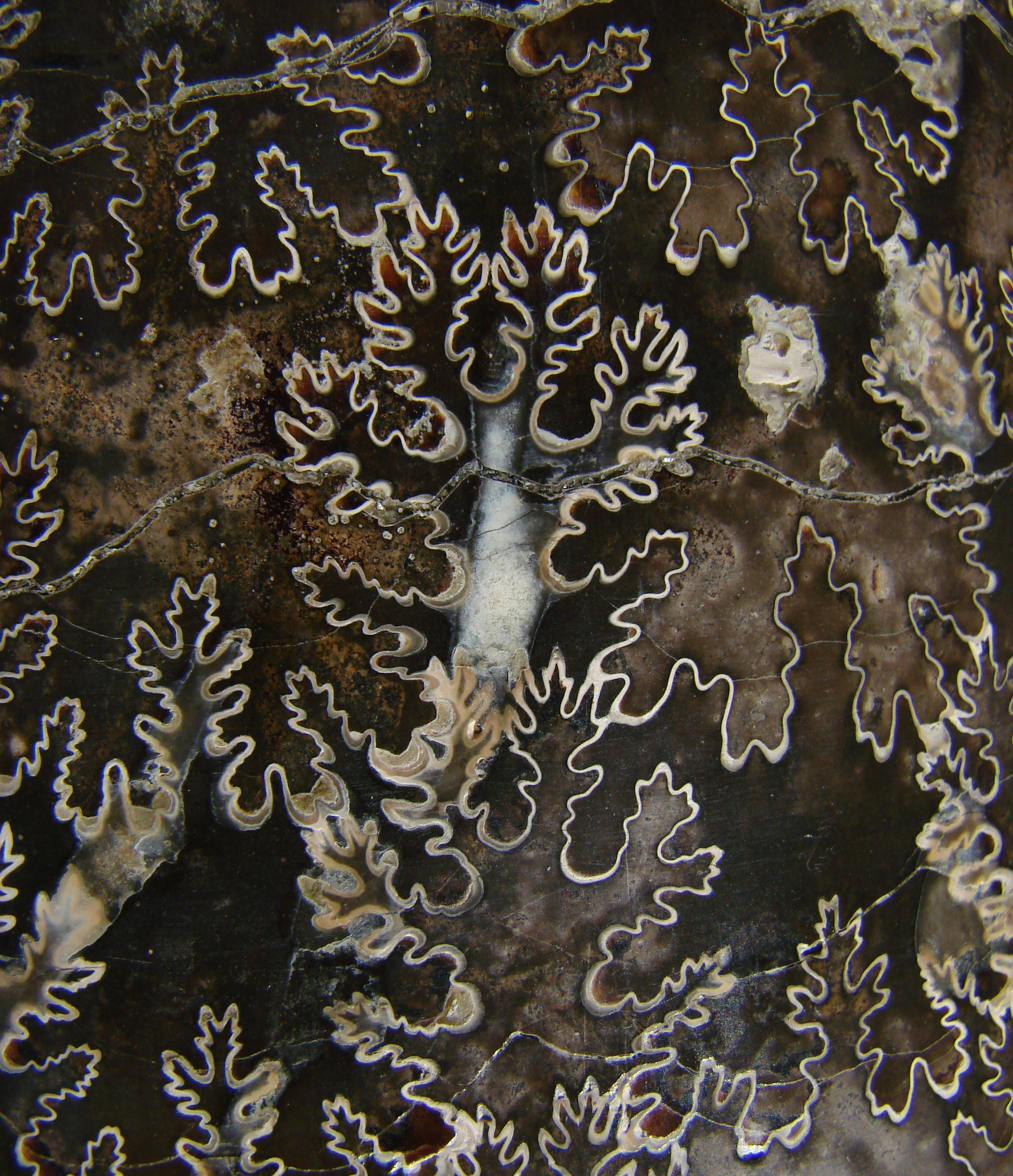
This internal mold fossil exhibits an ammonitic suture pattern.

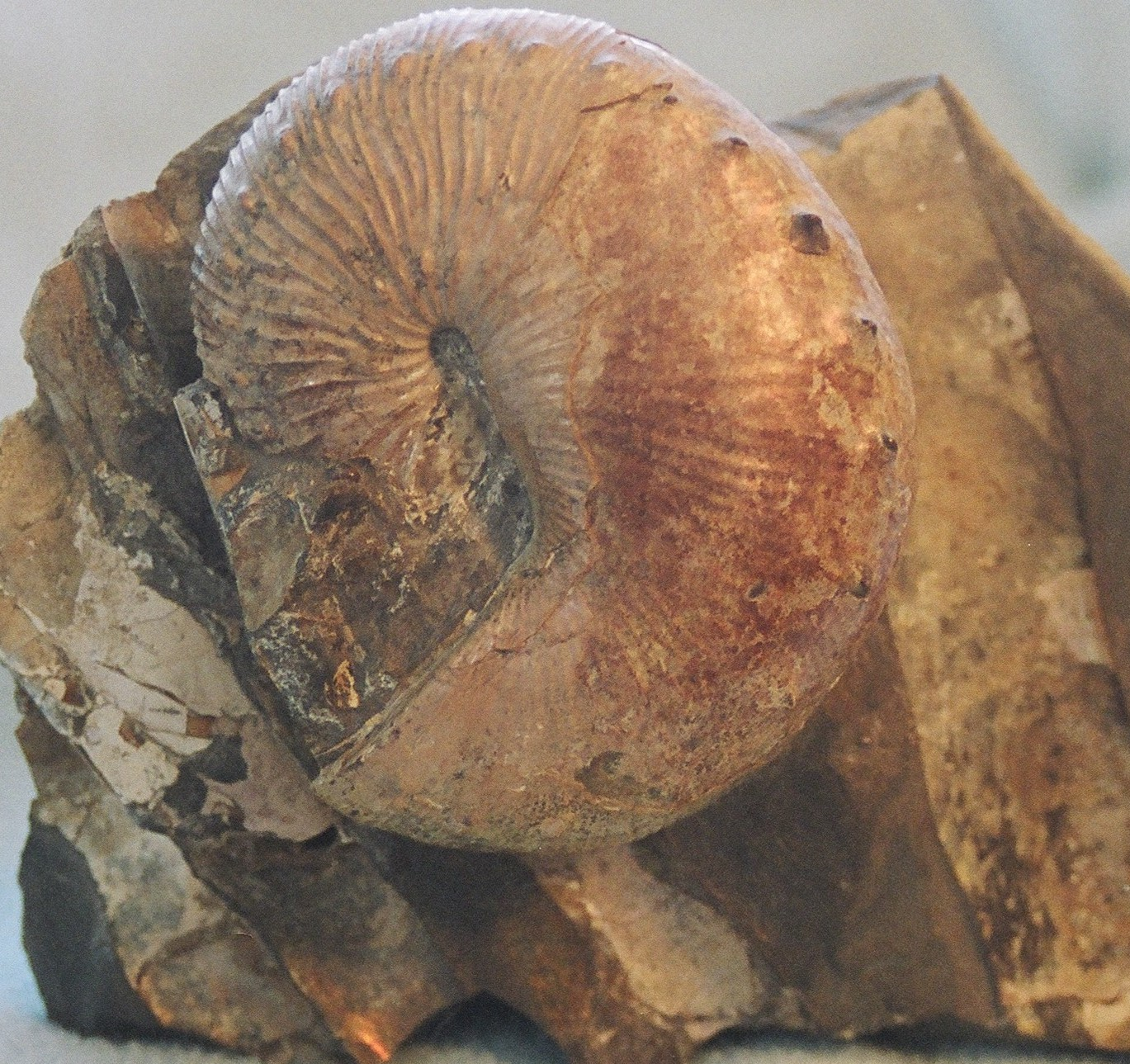
A specimen of Hoploscaphites from the Pierre Shale of South Dakota. Much of the original shell has survived.

=== Ha ===
- Haidingerites
- Halilucites
- Halorites
- Hamites
- Hamiticeras
- Hamitoides
- Hammatoceras
- Hammatocyclus
- Hamulina
- Hamulinites
- Hanielites
- Hannaoceras
- Hantkeniceras
- Haploceras
- Haplophylloceras
- Haplopleuroceras
- Haploscaphites
- Haresiceras
- Harpoceras
- Harpoceratoides
- Harpohildoceras
- Harpophylloceras
- Hatchericeras
- Hauericeras
- Hauerites
- Haugia

=== He ===
- Hebetoxyites
- Hecticoceras
- Hectioceras
- Hectioceratoides
- Hectoroceras
- Hedenstroemia
- Heinzia
- Helicancylus
- Helicocyclus
- Helictites
- Hemiaspenites
- Hemibaculites
- Hemigarantia
- Hemihaploceras
- Hemihoplites
- Hemilecanites
- Hemilytoceras
- Hemiptychoceras
- Hemisimoceras
- Hemitetragonites
- Hemitissotia
- Hengestites
- Heraclites
- Herrickiceras
- Hertleinites
- Herznachites
- Heteroceras
- Heterotissotia
- Hexaclymenia

=== Hi ===
- Hibernicoceras
- Hildaites
- Hildoceras
- Hildoceratoides
- Hildoglochiceras
- Himalayites
- Himantoceras
- Himavatites
- Himispiticeras

=== Hl ===
- Hlawiceras

=== Ho ===
- Hodsonites
- Hoeninghausia
- Hoepenites
- Hoffmannia
- Holcodiscoides
- Holcodiscus
- Holcolissoceras
- Holcophylloceras
- Holcolytoceras
- Holcoptychites
- Hollandites
- Holzapfeloceras
- Holzbergia
- Homerites
- Homoceras
- Homoceratoides
- Homoeoplanulites
- Hoplikosmokas
- Hoplites
- Hoplitoides
- Hoplitoplacenticeras
- Hoplocardioceras
- Hoplocrioceras
- Hoploscaphites
- Hoplotropites
- Horioceras
- Hourcquia

=== Hu ===
- Hubertoceras
- Hudlestonia
- Hudsonoceras
- Huishuites
- Hulenites
- Hunanites
- Hungarites

=== Hy ===
- Hyattites
- Hyattoceras
- Hybonoticeras
- Hypacanthoplites
- Hyparpadites
- Hypengonoceras
- Hyperderoceras
- Hypergoniatites
- Hyperlioceras
- Hyphantoceras
- Hyphoplites
- Hypisculites
- Hypocladiscites
- Hypophylloceras
- Hypoturrilites
- Hypoxynoticeras
- Hyrcanites
- Hysteroceras

== I ==
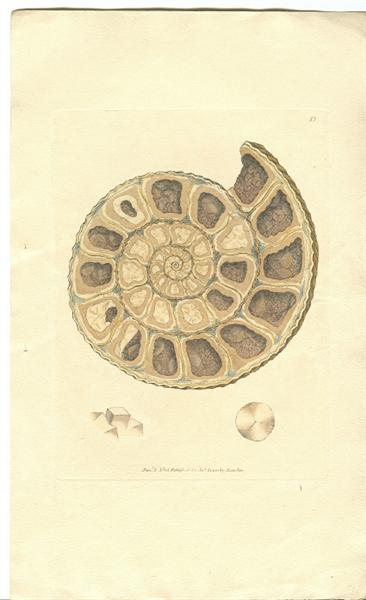
This is an illustration from British Mineralology by James Smith. The catalogue, from which it is sourced, describes the print as "1802 [sic] Fossil Amonite Engraving"

- Iberites
- Idanoceras
- Idiocycloceras
- Idiohamites
- Idoceras
- Ilowaiskya
- Imitoceras
- Imlayiceras
- Inaigymnites
- Indigirites
- Indigirophyllites
- Indoceltites
- Indocephalites
- Indoceras
- Indojuvavites
- Indonesites
- Indoscaphites
- Indosphinctes
- Iniskinites
- Intoceras
- Intornites
- Intranodites
- Involuticeras
- Inyoites
- Inzeroceras
- Iranoceras
- Irinoceras
- Isculites
- Isculitoides
- Ismidites
- Isohomoceras
- Isohoplites
- Isterites
- Istreites
- Ivoites

== J ==
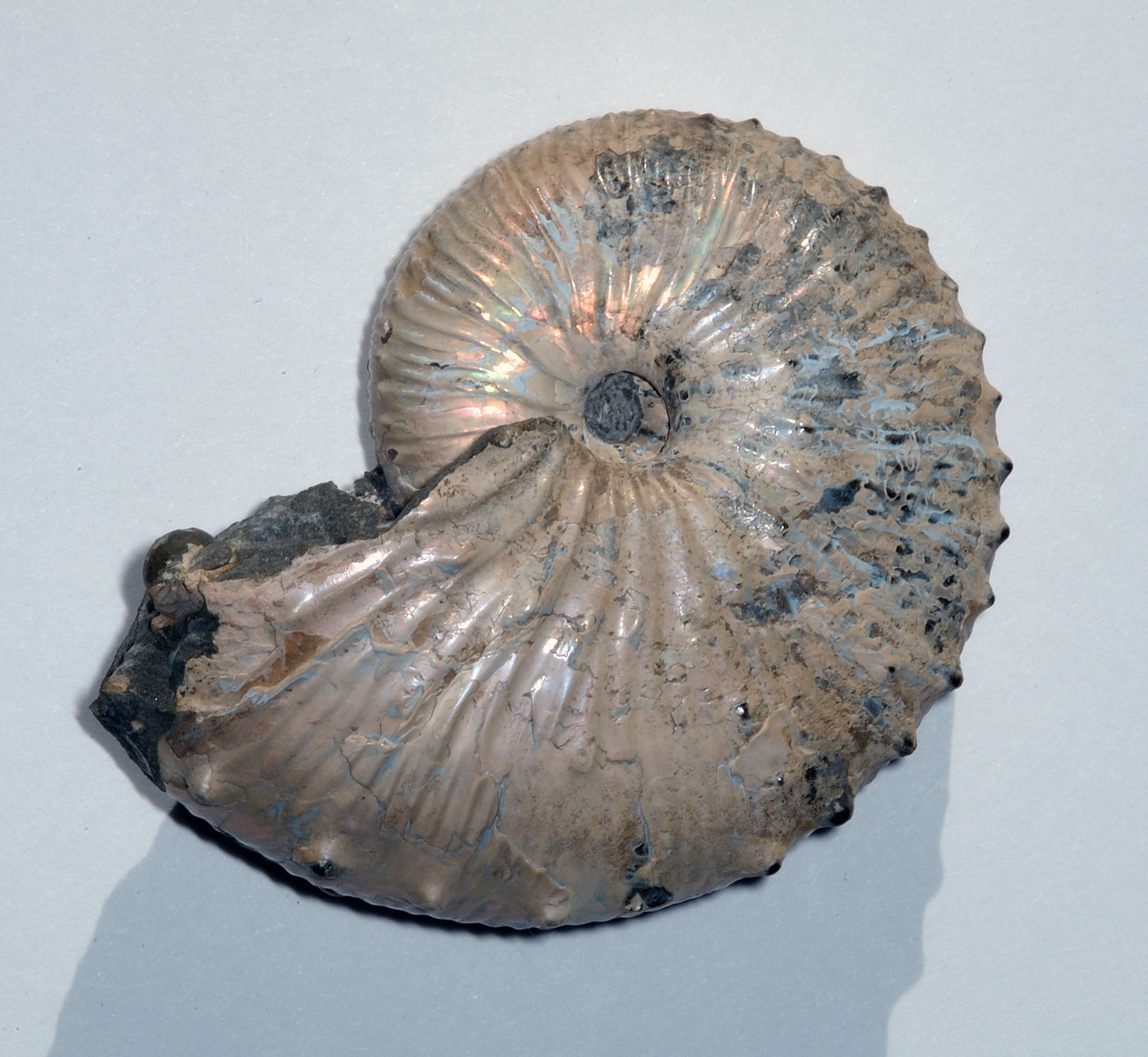
Jeletzkytes, a Cretaceous ammonite from the United States

- Jacobites
- Janenschites
- Japonites
- Jauberticeras
- Jeanneticeras
- Jeanvogericeras
- Jeletzkytes
- Jellinekites
- Jimboiceras
- Jimenites
- Joannites
- Jouaniceras
- Jovites
- Juddiceras
- Judicarites
- Juraphyllites
- Juresanites
- Juvavites
- Juvenites

== K ==
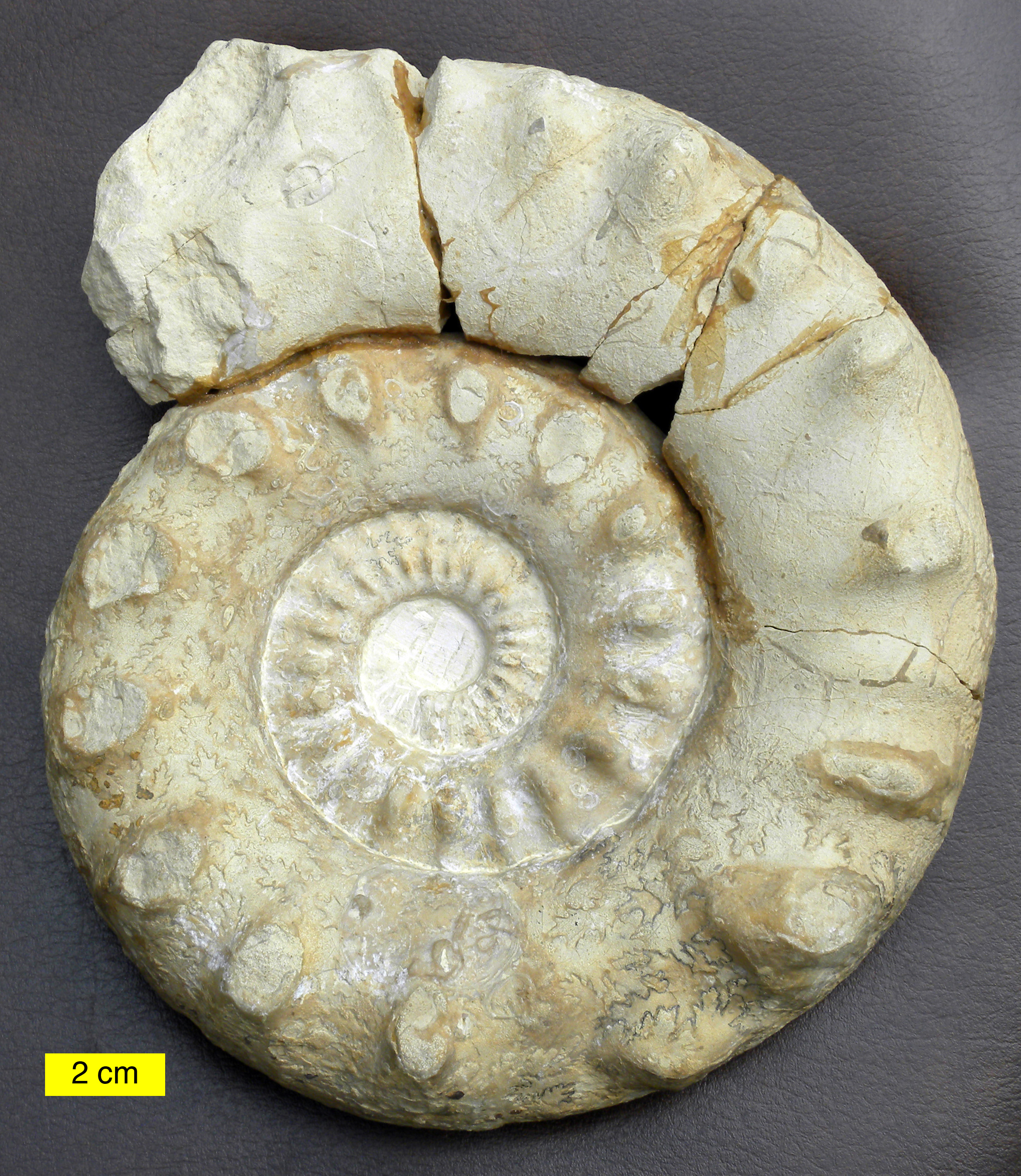
Peltoceras solidum, Jurassic period of Israel

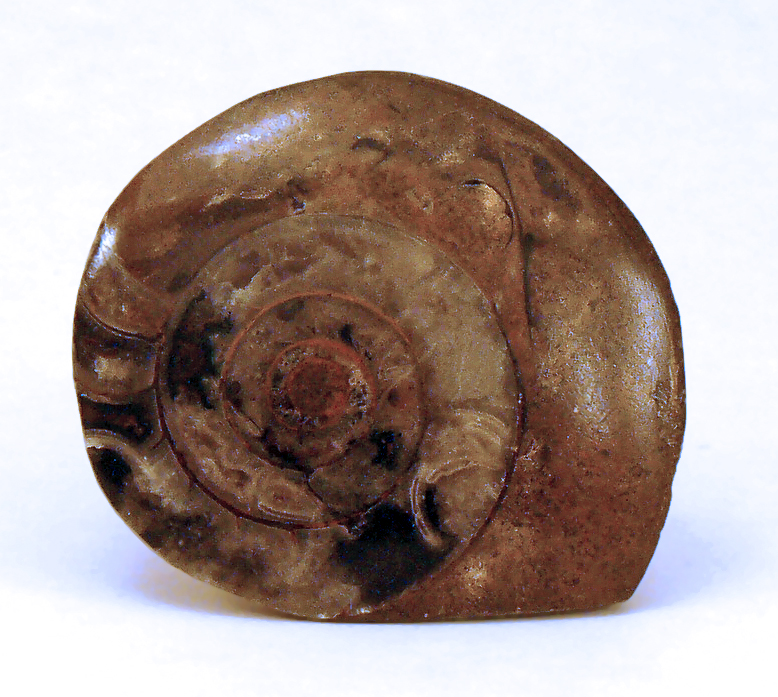
An ammonite fossil.

- Kabylites
- Kachpurites
- Kalloclymenia
- Kamerunoceras
- Kammerkaroceras
- Kamptoclymenia
- Kamptokephalites
- Karaclymenia
- Karagandoceras
- Karamaiceras
- Karamaites
- Karangatites
- Karapadites
- Karaschiceras
- Kardailites
- Karlwaageites
- Karsteniceras
- Kashmirites
- Katacanites
- Katroliceras
- Katrolites
- Kayutoceras
- Kazakhoceras
- Kazakhoclymenia
- Kazakhstania
- Kazakhstanites
- Kazanskyella
- Kellawaysites
- Kellnerites
- Kelteroceras
- Kenseyoceras
- Kepplerites
- Keppleritiana
- Kerberites
- Keyserlingites
- Kheraiceras
- Kheraites
- Khvalynites
- Kiaclymenia
- Kielcensia
- Kilianella
- Kimoceras
- Kingites
- Kingoceras
- Kinkeliniceras
- Kiparisovia
- Kiparisovites
- Kirsoceras
- Kitchinites
- Klamathites
- Klematosphinctes
- Klipsteinia
- Knemiceras
- Koenenites
- Kohaticeras
- Koloceras
- Komioceras
- Koninckites
- Korythoceras
- Kosmermoceras
- Kosmoceras
- Kosmoclymenia
- Kossmatella
- Kossmatia
- Kossmaticeras
- Kourazoceras
- Kozhimites
- Krafftoceras
- Kranaosphinctes
- Krumbeckia
- Kufengoceras
- Kumatostephanus
- Kurnubiella
- Kushanites
- Kutatissites

== L ==
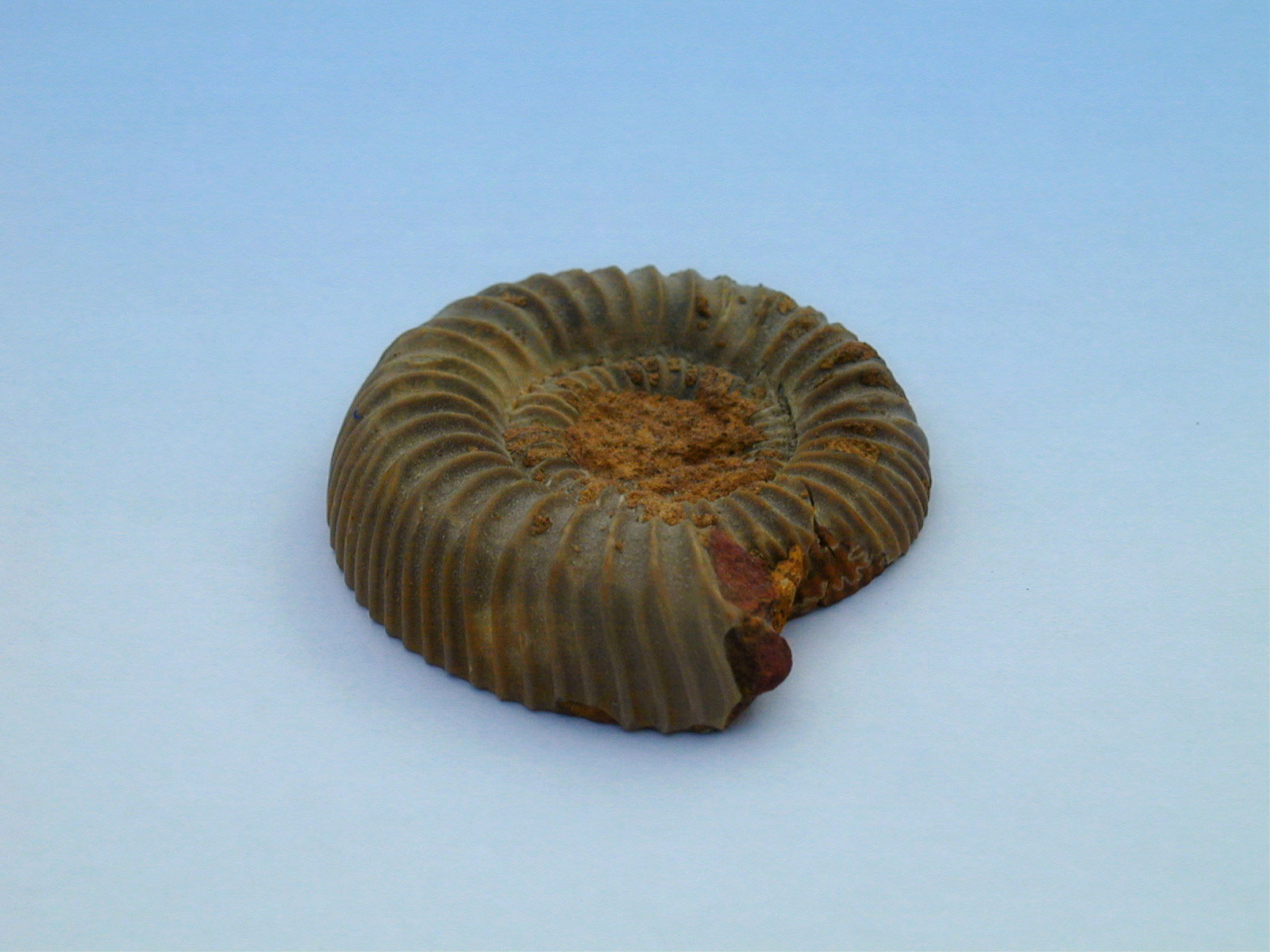
Fossil ammonite

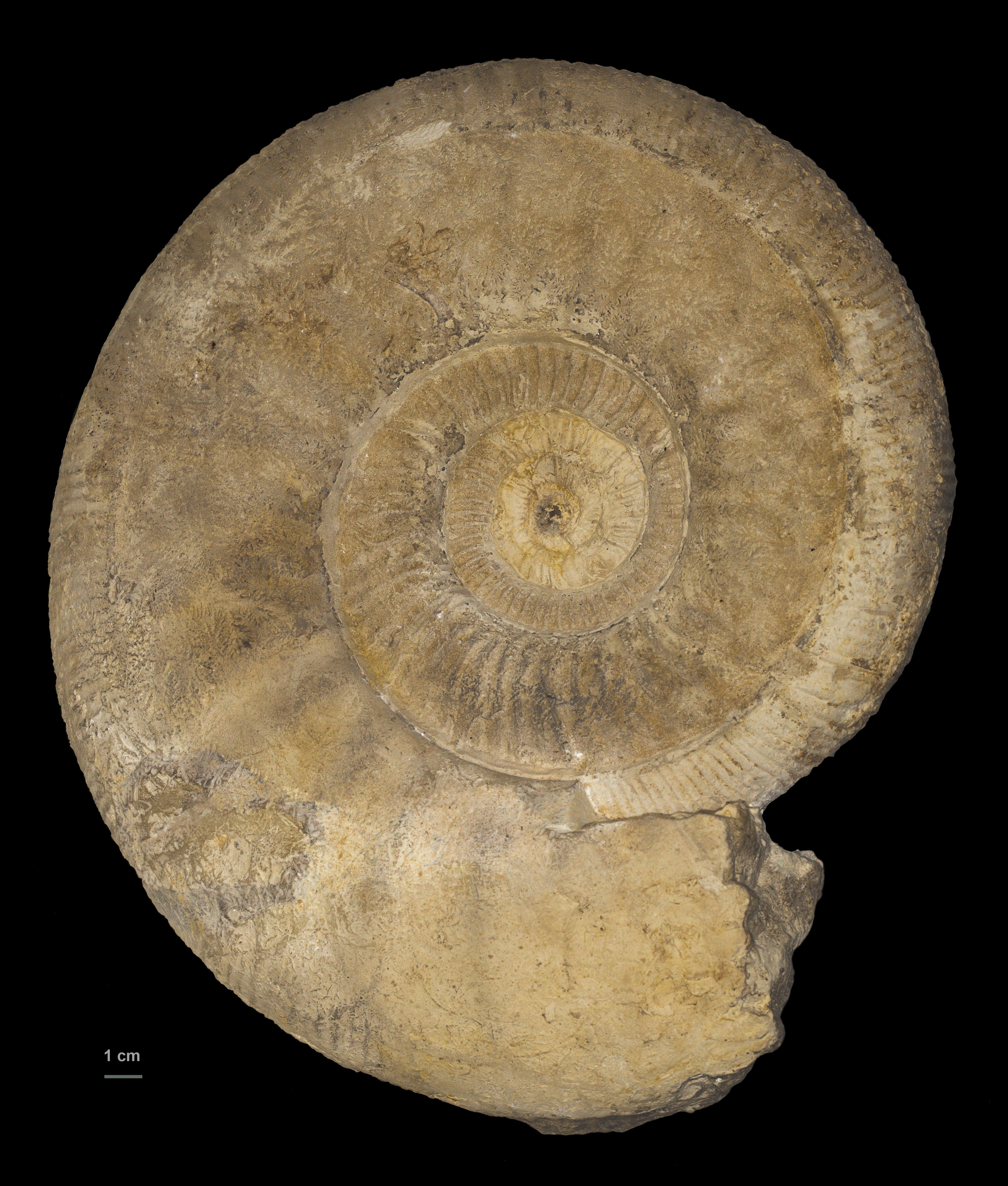
Lithacosphinctes achilles

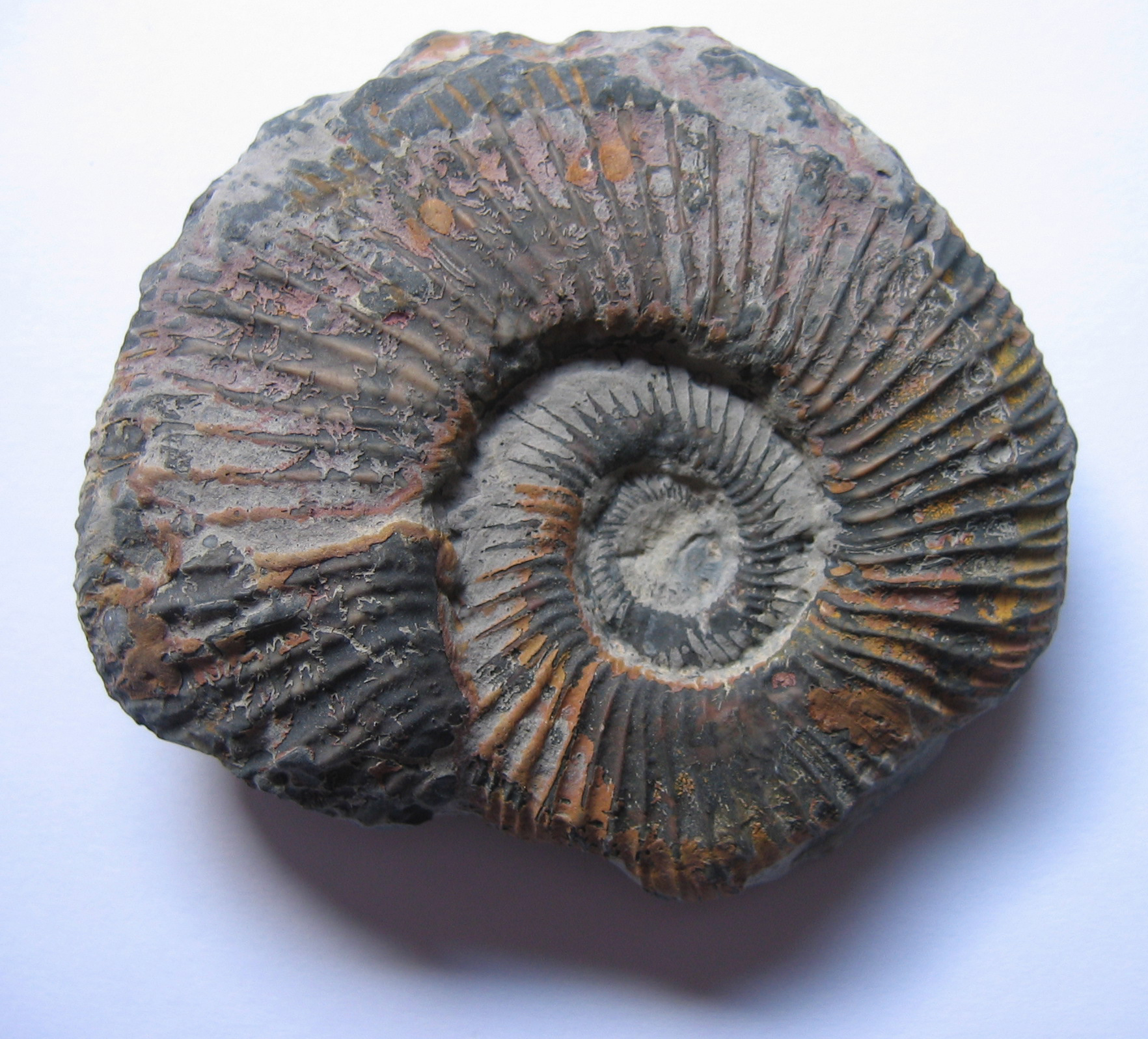
Uptonia jamesioni

- Labeceras
- Laboceras
- Labyrinthoceras
- Laganoclymenia
- Lagowites
- Lamberticeras
- Lamites
- Lanceolites
- Lanceoloboceras
- Laqueoceras
- Latanarcestes
- Latisageceras
- Laugeites
- Lecanites
- Lechites
- Lecointriceras
- Leconteiceras
- Leconteites
- Leeites
- Lehmaniceras
- Leioceras
- Leiophyllites
- Leislingites
- Lemuroceras
- Lenotropites
- Lenticeras
- Lenticoceltites
- Leopolda
- Leptaleoceras
- Leptechioceras
- Lepthoplites
- Leptoceras
- Leptonotoceras
- Leptosphinctes
- Leptotetragonites
- Leukadiella
- Lewesiceras
- Lewyites
- Leymeriella
- Liardites
- Liautaudia
- Libycoceras
- Lilloetia
- Limaites
- Linguaclymenia
- Linguatornoceras
- Lingyunites
- Lioceratoides
- Liosphinctes
- Liparoceras
- Lipuites
- Lissoceras
- Lissoceratoides
- Lissoclymenia
- Lissonia
- Lissonites
- Lithacoceras
- Lithacosphinctes
- Lithancylus
- Lobites
- Lobobactrites
- Lobokosmokeras
- Lobolytoceras
- Lobosphinctes
- Lobotornoceras
- Loczyceras
- Lomonossovella
- Longaeviceras
- Longobardites
- Longobarditoides
- Lopholobites
- Lorioloceras
- Lotzeites
- Ludwigia
- Lunuloceras
- Lupherites
- Luppovella
- Lusitanites
- Lycetticeras
- Lyelliceras
- Lyrogoniatites
- Lytheoceras
- Lyticoceras
- Lytoceras
- Lytocrioceras
- Lytodiscoides
- Lytogyroceras
- Lytohoplites

== M ==
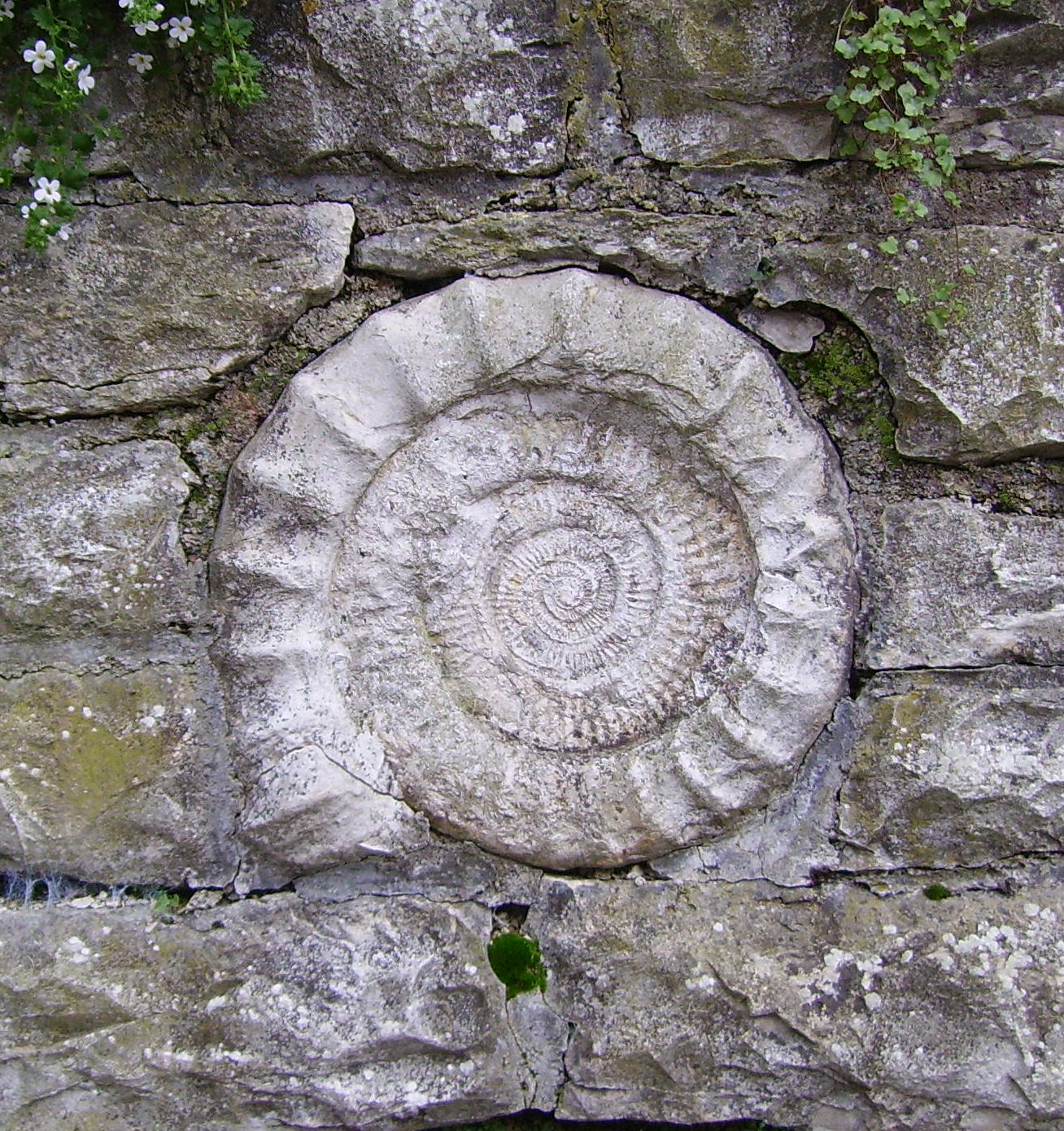
A photo of a Bavarian ammonite being used as a decorative piece in a brick wall.

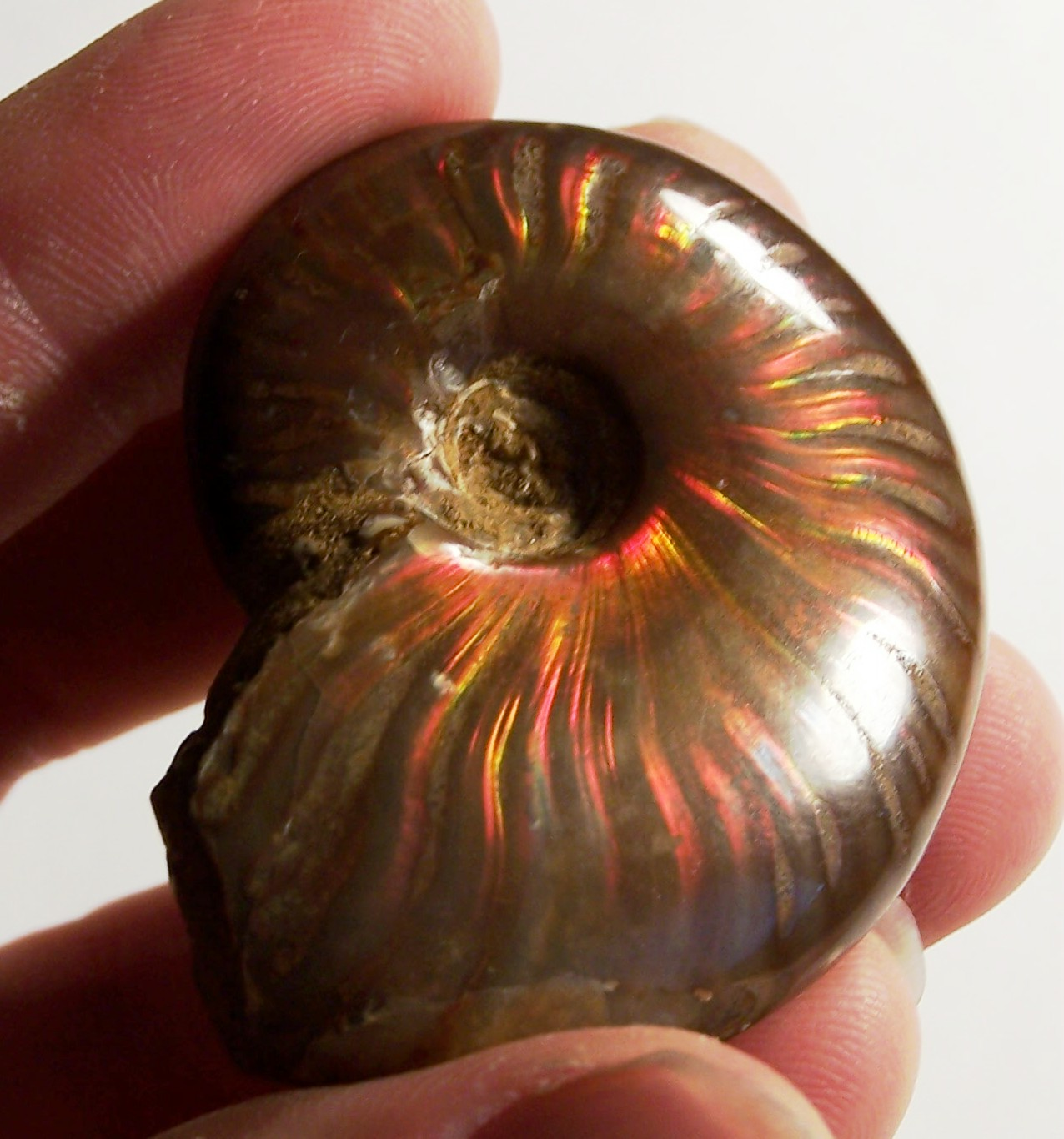
An iridescent ammonite from Madagascar.

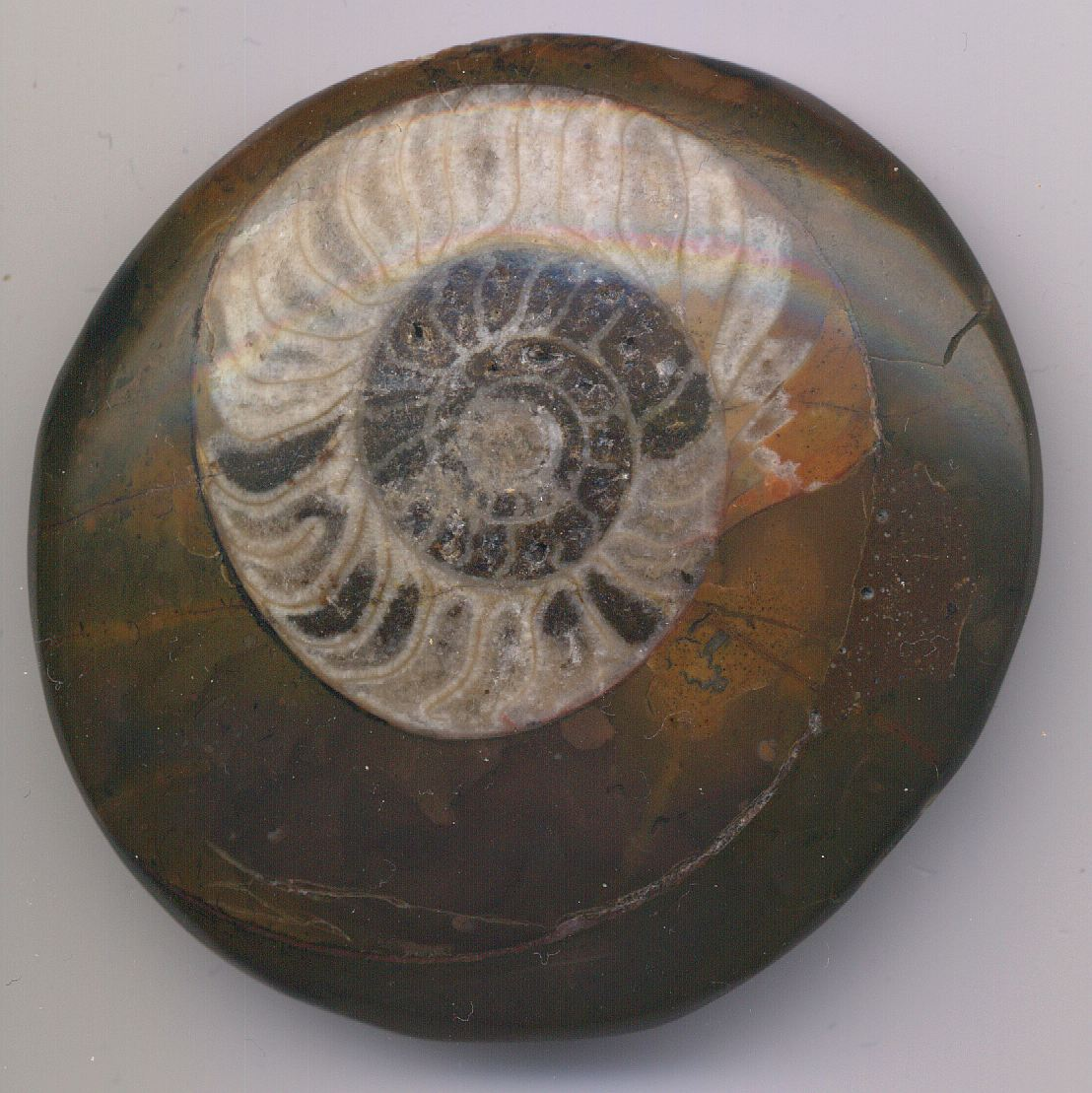
Polished cross-section of an ammonite

=== Ma ===
- Macrocephalites
- Macroscaphites
- Madagascarites
- Maenioceras
- Magharina
- Malayites
- Malladaites
- Malletophychites
- Maltoniceras
- Mammites
- Manambolites
- Mancosiceras
- Mangeroceras
- Manoloviceras
- Mantelliceras
- Manticoceras
- Manuaniceras
- Maorites
- Mapesites
- Marathonites
- Margaritropites
- Marianoceras
- Mariella
- Marshallites
- Martelites
- Martolites
- Masiaposites
- Masonites
- Maternoceras
- Mathoceras
- Mathoceratites
- Maximites
- Mayaites
- Mazapilites

=== Me ===
- Medlicottia
- Meekoceras
- Megalytoceras
- Megaphyllites
- Megapronorites
- Megasphaeroceras
- Megatyloceras
- Meginoceras
- Melagathiceras
- Melchiorites
- Melonites
- Melvilloceras
- Menabites
- Menabonites
- Meneghiniceras
- Menuites
- Menuthiocrioceras
- Mercaticeras
- Merocanites
- Mescalites
- Mesobeloceras
- Mesocladiscites
- Mesoclymenia
- Mesodactylites
- Mesogaudryceras
- Mesopuzosia
- Mesosimoceras
- Mesoturrilites
- Metabactrites
- Metacanites
- Metacarnites
- Metacymbites
- Metadagnoceras
- Metaderoceras
- Metadimorphoceras
- Metadinarites
- Metagravesia
- Metahamites
- Metahaploceras
- Metahedenstroemia
- Metahoplites
- Metalegoceras
- Metalytoceras
- Metapatoceras
- Metapeltoceras
- Metaplacenticeras
- Metapronorites
- Metaptychoceras
- Metarnioceras
- Metasibirites
- Metasigaloceras
- Metassuria
- Metatibetites
- Metatissotia
- Metengonoceras
- Metinyoites
- Metoicoceras
- Metoxynoticeras
- Metrolytoceras
- Metussuria
- Mexicoceras

=== Mi ===
- Miccocephalites
- Michalskia
- Michiganites
- Micracanthoceras
- Microbactrites
- Microbiplices
- Microdactylites
- Microderoceras
- Micromphalites
- Microtropites
- Miklukhoceras
- Miltites
- Mimagoniatites
- Mimimitoceras
- Mimosphinctes
- Mirilentia
- Miroclymenia
- Mirojuvavites
- Mirosphinctes
- Mitonia
- Mixomanticoceras
- Miyakoceras

=== Mo ===
- Moffitites
- Mojsisovicsites
- Mojsisoviczia
- Mojsvarites
- Monacanthites
- Mongoloceras
- Monophyllites
- Moremanoceras
- Morphoceras
- Morrisiceras
- Morrowites
- Mortoniceras
- Moutoniceras

=== Mu ===
- Mucrodactylites
- Muensterites
- Muensteroceras
- Muniericeras

=== My ===
- Myloceras

== N ==
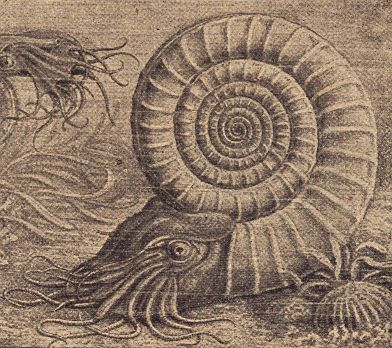
An early ammonite reconstruction.

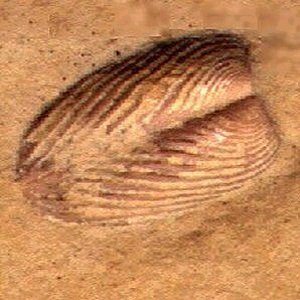
The Aptychus is a mysterious piece of ammonite anatomy.

=== Na ===
- Nairites
- Nannites
- Nannocardioceras
- Nannolytoceras
- Nannostephanus
- Nannovascoceras
- Nassichukites
- Nathorstites
- Nautellipsites

=== Ne ===
- Neancyloceras
- Nebraskites
- Nebrodites
- Negebites
- Nejdia
- Nelomites
- Neoaganides
- Neobibolites
- Neocardioceras
- Neochetoceras
- Neocladiscites
- Neoclypites
- Neocolumbites
- Neocomites
- Neocosmoceras
- Neocraspedites
- Neocrimites
- Neocrioceras
- Neodimorphoceras
- Neogastroplites
- Neogauthiericeras
- Neogeoceras
- Neoglaphyrites
- Neoglyphioceras
- Neoglytoxoceras
- Neogoniatites
- Neograhamites
- Neoharpoceras
- Neohimavatites
- Neohoploceras
- Neoicoceras
- Neokentoceras
- Neolioceratoides
- Neolissoceras
- Neolobites
- Neomantelliceras
- Neomanticoceras
- Neomicroceras
- Neomorphoceras
- Neopericyclus
- Neopharciceras
- Neophlycticeras
- Neophylloceras
- Neopopanoceras
- Neopronorites
- Neoprotrachyceras
- Neoptychites
- Neopulchellia
- Neosaynoceras
- Neoselwynoceras
- Neoshumardites
- Neosilesites
- Neosirenites
- Neostlingoceras
- Neotibetites
- Neouddenites
- Neuqueniceras
- Nevadisculites
- Nevadites
- Nevadoceras
- Nevadophyllites
- Newboldiceras
- Newmarracarroceras

=== Ni ===
- Niceforoceras
- Nicklesia
- Nicomedites
- Nielsenoceras
- Nigericeras
- Nipponites
- Nitanoceras

=== No ===
- Nodiocoeloceras
- Nodosageceras
- Nodosoclymenia
- Nodosohoplites
- Nodotibetites
- Noetlingites
- Nolaniceras
- Nomismoceras
- Nordiceras
- Nordophiceras
- Noridiscites
- Norites
- Normannites
- Nostoceras
- Nothocephalites
- Nothosporadoceras
- Nothostephanus
- Notoceras
- Nowakites

=== Nu ===
- Nuculoceras
- Nummoceras

== O ==
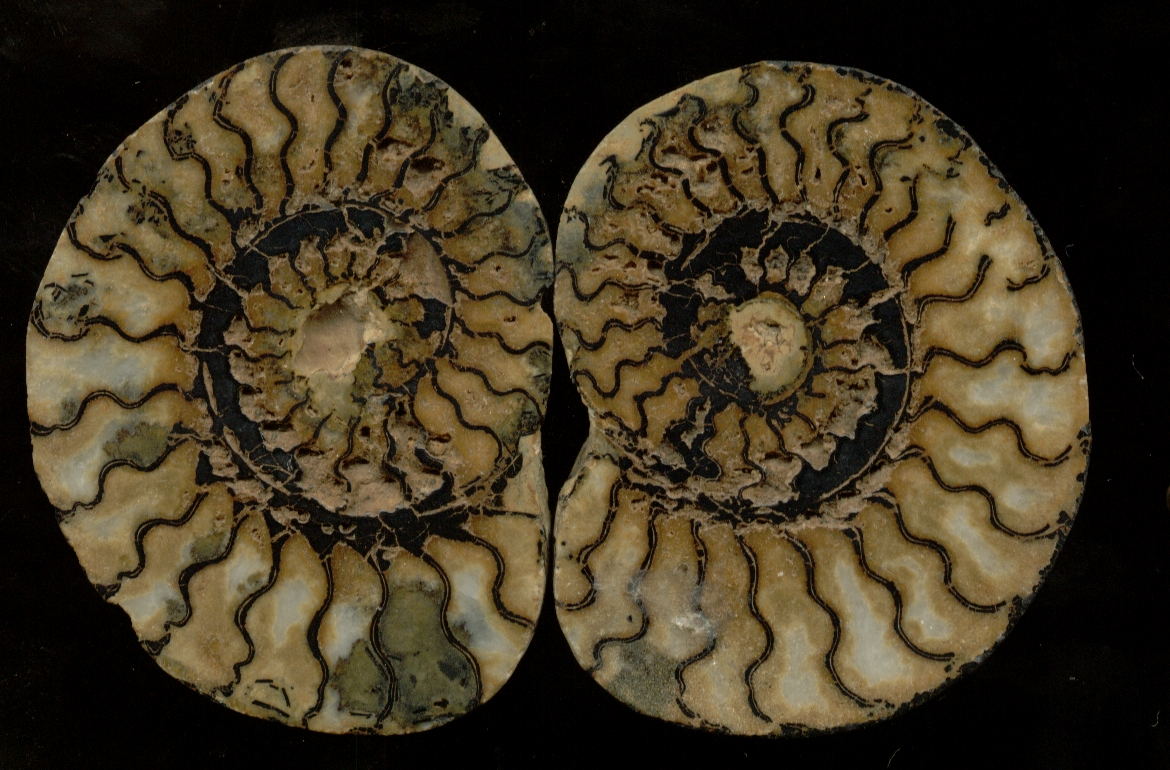
Two polished halves of an ammonite fossil.

- Obrutchevites
- Obtusicostites
- Ochetoceras
- Ochotoceras
- Odontodiscoceras
- Oecoptychius
- Oecotraustes
- Oiophyllites
- Oistoceras
- Okribites
- Olcostephanus
- Olenekoceras
- Olenikites
- Onitshoceras
- Onychoceras
- Oosterella
- Ophiceras
- Ophilyroceras
- Oppelia
- Oraniceras
- Orestites
- Organoceras
- Orionoides
- Ornatoclymenia
- Orthaspidoceras
- Orthildaites
- Orthoceltites
- Orthogarantiana
- Orthosphinctes
- Orulganites
- Ostlingoceras
- Otoceltites
- Otoceras
- Otohoplites
- Otoites
- Otoscaphites
- Ovaticeras
- Owenites
- Owenoceras
- Oxintoceras
- Oxybeloceras
- Oxycerites
- Oxydiscites
- Oxylenticeras
- Oxynoticeras
- Oxyparoniceras
- Oxytornoceras
- Oxytropidoceras

== P ==
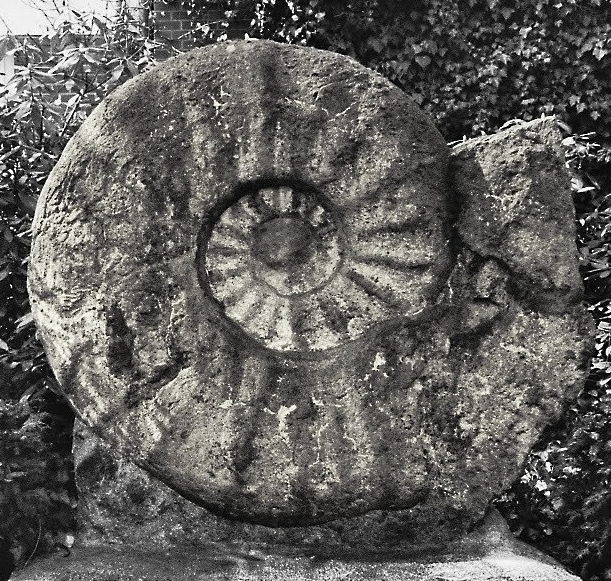
Parapuzosia was a very large ammonite genus.

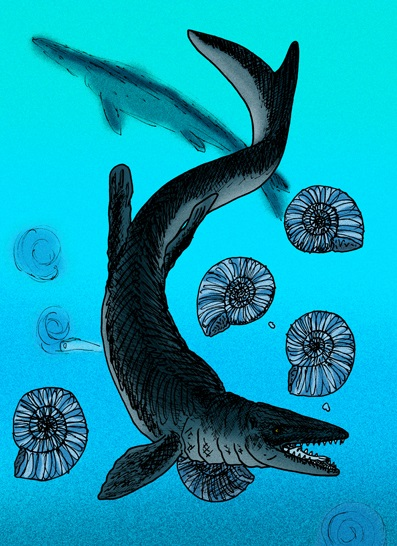
Restoration of the mosasaur Mosasaurus hoffmannii compared to individuals of Parapuzosia.

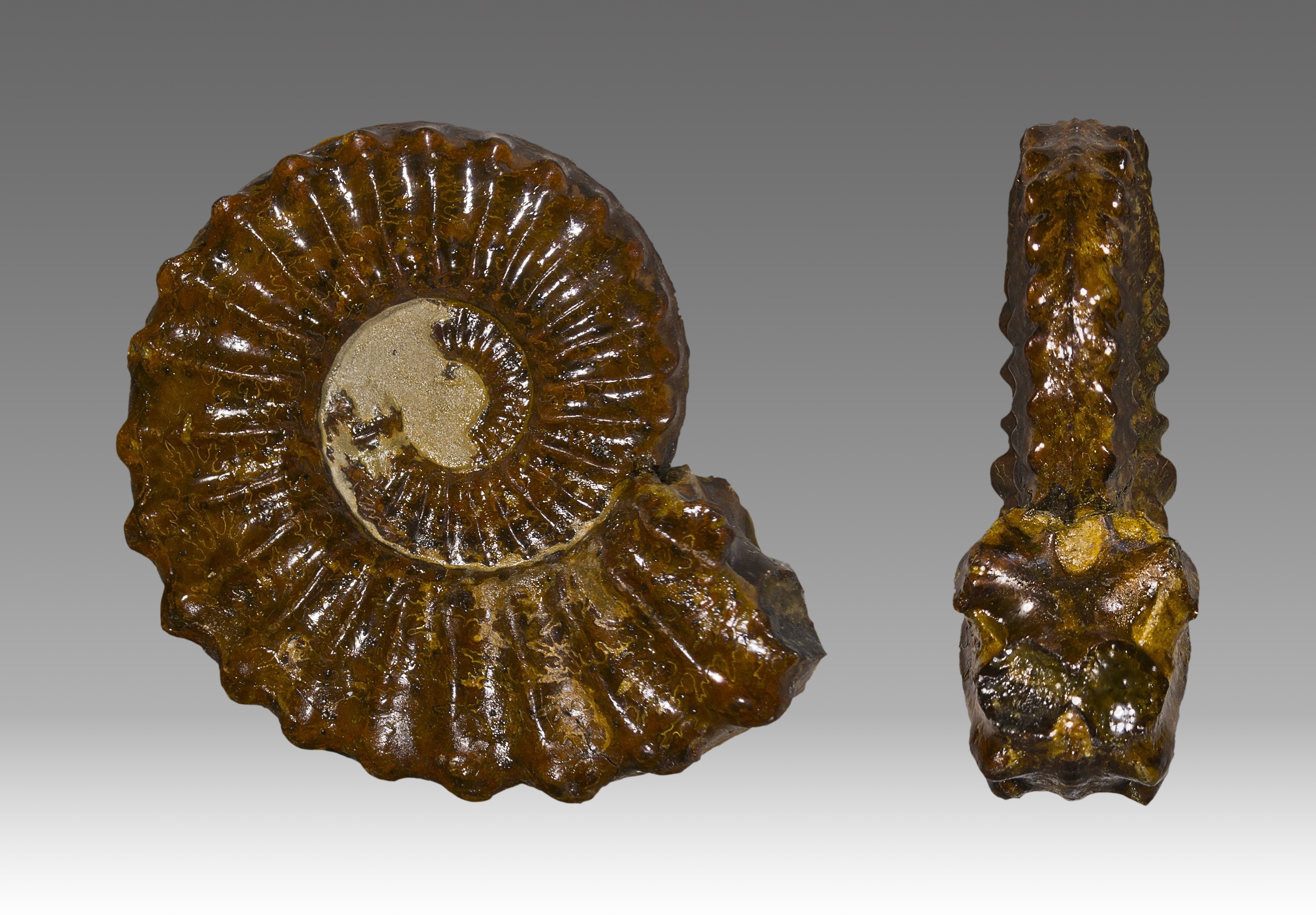
Pleuroceras spinatum Museum of Toulouse

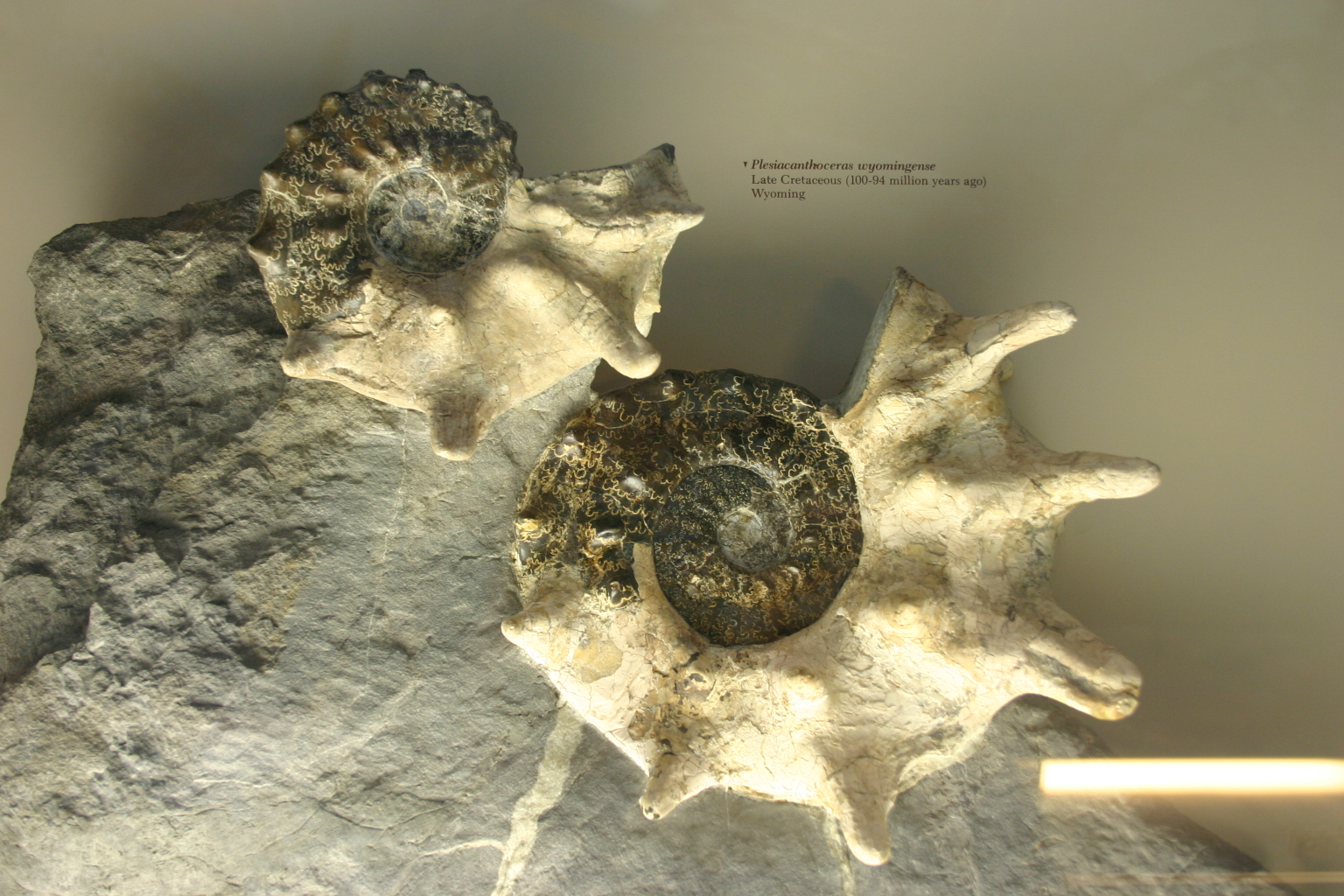
Plesiacanthoceras wyomingense.

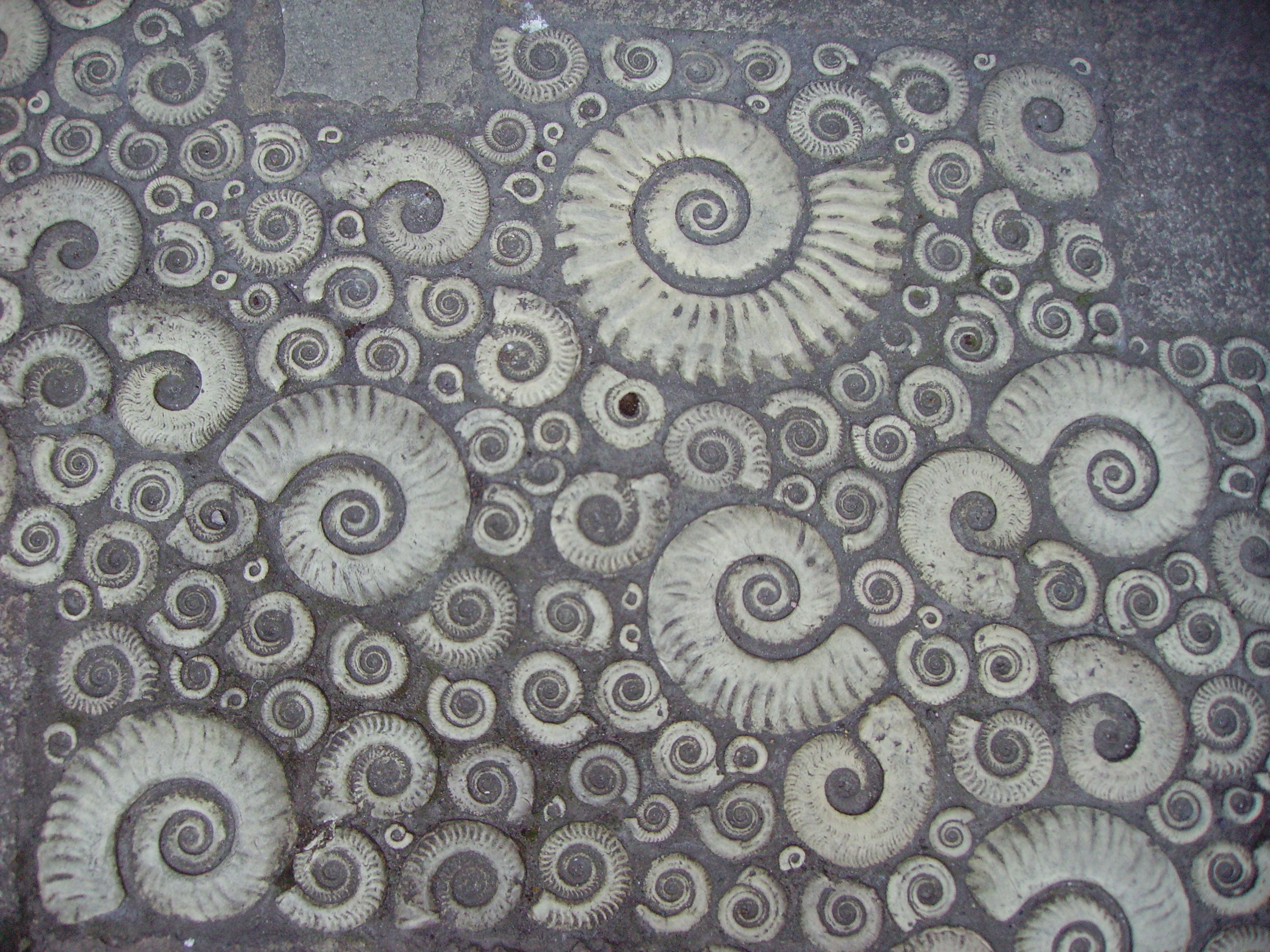
The pavement outside the Lyme Regis museum, made of concrete cast in the shape of Ammonites.

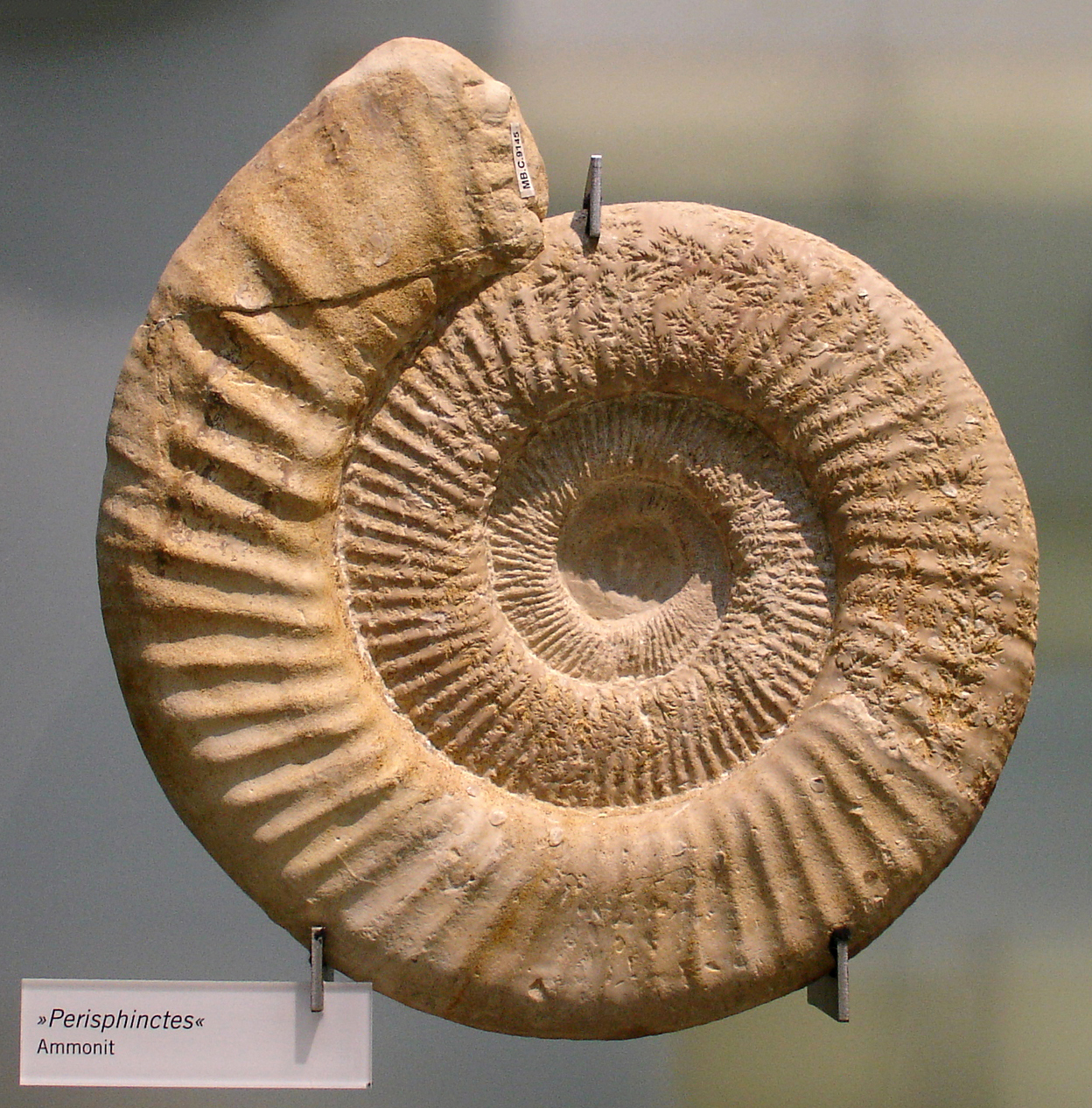
A Perisphinctes fossil.

=== Pa ===
- Pachycardioceras
- Pachyceras
- Pachyclymenia
- Pachydesmoceras
- Pachydiscoides
- Pachydiscus
- Pachyerymnoceras
- Pachylyroceras
- Pachylytoceras
- Pachypictonia
- Pachysphinctes
- Padagrosites
- Padragosiceras
- Palaeogoniatites
- Palaeokazachstanites
- Palaeophyllites
- Palermites
- Palicites
- Paltaopites
- Paltechioceras
- Pamphagosirenites
- Paprothites
- Paquiericeras
- Paraacrochordiceras
- Parabactrites
- Parabehavites
- Paraberriasella
- Parabevalites
- Paraboliceras
- Paraboliceratoides
- Paracadoceras
- Paracalycoceras
- Paracanthoplites
- Paraceltites
- Paraceratites
- Paraceratitoides
- Paracladiscites
- Paracochloceras
- Paraconlinoceras
- Paracorniceras
- Paracraspedites
- Paracravenoceras
- Paracrioceras
- Paracuariceras
- Paracymbites
- Paradanubites
- Paradasyceras
- Paradicidia
- Paradimeroceras
- Paradimorphoceras
- Paradinarites
- Paradistichites
- Paradolphia
- Paraganides
- Paragastrioceras
- Paragattendorfia
- Paragoceras
- Paraguembelites
- Paragymnites
- Parahauerites
- Parahildaites
- Parahomoceras
- Parahoplites
- Parajaubertella
- Parajuvavites
- Parakellnerites
- Paralcidia
- Paralenticeras
- Paralobites
- Paralytoceras
- Paramammites
- Parammatoceras
- Paranannites
- Paranclyoceras
- Parandiceras
- Paranorites
- Paranoritoides
- Parapallasiceras
- Parapatoceras
- Parapeltoceras
- Paraperrinites
- Paraphyllites
- Parapinacoceras
- Paraplacites
- Parapopanoceras
- Parapronorites
- Parapuzosia
- Pararasenia
- Pararcestes
- Pararnioceras
- Parasageceras
- Parasaynoceras
- Paraschartymites
- Paraschistoceras
- Parashumardites
- Parasibirites
- Parasilesites
- Parasolenoceras
- Paraspidites
- Paraspidoceras
- Paraspiticeras
- Parastieria
- Parastrenoceras
- Parasturia
- Paratexanites
- Parathetidites
- Parathisbites
- Paratibites
- Paratirolites
- Paratissotia
- Paratorleyoceras
- Paratornoceras
- Paratrachyceras
- Paratropites
- Paraturrilites
- Paravirgatites
- Parawedekindia
- Parawocklumeria
- Parayakutoceras
- Parengonoceras
- Parentites
- Parinodiceras
- Parkinsonia
- Parodiceras
- Parodontoceras
- Paroecotraustes
- Paroniceras
- Paroxynoticeras
- Partschiceras
- Parussuria
- Paryphoceras
- Pascoeites
- Paskentites
- Passendorferia
- Patagiosites
- Paulotropites
- Pavlovia
- Pavloviceras

=== Pe ===
- Pearylandites
- Pectinatites
- Pedioceras
- Peltoceras
- Peltoceratoides
- Peltolytoceras
- Peltomorphites
- Pennoceras
- Pentagonoceras
- Pericarinoceras
- Pericleites
- Pericyclus
- Peripleurites
- Perisphinctes
- Peritrochia
- Pernoceras
- Peroniceras
- Peronoceras
- Perrinites
- Perrinoceras
- Pervinquieria
- Petitclercia
- Petranoceras
- Petrolytoceras
- Petteroceras
- Peytonoceras

=== Ph ===
- Phaneroceras
- Phanerostephanus
- Pharciceras
- Phaularpites
- Phaulostephanus
- Phaulozigzag
- Phillipites
- Phillipsoceras
- Phlycticeras
- Phlycticrioceras
- Phlyseogrammoceras
- Phoenixites
- Phormedites
- Phricodoceras
- Phylloceras
- Phyllocladiscites
- Phyllopachyceras
- Phylloptychoceras
- Phyllytoceras
- Phymatoceras
- Physematites
- Physeogrammoceras
- Physodoceras

=== Pi ===
- Picenia
- Pictetia
- Pictonia
- Pimelites
- Pinaclymenia
- Pinacoceras
- Pinacoplacites
- Piriclymenia

=== Pl ===
- Placenticeras
- Placites
- Planammatoceras
- Planisphinctes
- Plasmatoceras
- Platotropites
- Platyclymenia
- Platycuccoceras
- Platygoniatites
- Platylenticeras
- Platynoticeras
- Platypleuroceras
- Playfordites
- Plesiacanthoceras
- Plesiacanthoides
- Plesiohamites
- Plesiospitidiscus
- Plesiotissotia
- Plesioturrilites
- Pleuroacanthites
- Pleurocephalites
- Pleuroceras
- Pleurodistichites
- Pleurohoplites
- Pleurolytoceras
- Pleuronodoceras
- Pleuropinacoceras
- Pleurotexanites
- Pleydellia
- Plictetia

=== Po ===
- Poculisphinctes
- Poecilomorphus
- Polaricyclus
- Politoceras
- Polonites
- Polonoceras
- Polymorphites
- Polyplectites
- Polyplectus
- Polyptychites
- Polyptychoceras
- Polysphinctes
- Pomerania
- Pompeckioceras
- Pompeckjites
- Ponteixites
- Ponticeras
- Popanites
- Popanoceras
- Poporites
- Porpoceras
- Postglatziella
- Posttornoceras

=== Pr ===
- Praebigotites
- Praedaraelites
- Praeglyphioceras
- Praemanambolites
- Praemeroceras
- Praemuniericeras
- Praeparkinsonia
- Praepolyplectus
- Praesphaeroceras
- Praestrigites
- Praetollia
- Pravitoceras
- Preflorianites
- Preflorianitoides
- Prenkites
- Preshumardites
- Presimoceras
- Pricella
- Prionites
- Prionoceras
- Prionocycloceras
- Prionocyclus
- Prionodoceras
- Proarcestes
- Proavites
- Probeloceras
- Procarnites
- Procerites
- Procerozigzag
- Procheloniceras
- Prochorites
- Procladiscites
- Procliviceras
- Procolumbites
- Procraspedites
- Prodactylioceras
- Prodeshayesites
- Prodromites
- Progalbanites
- Progeronia
- Progonoceratites
- Progonioclymenia
- Prograyiceras
- Proharpoceras
- Prohauericeras
- Prohecticoceras
- Prohelicoceras
- Prohungarites
- Prohysteroceras
- Projuvavites
- Prolecanites
- Proleopoldia
- Proleymeriella
- Prolobites
- Prolyelliceras
- Promantelliceras
- Promicroceras
- Proniceras
- Pronoetlingites
- Pronorites
- Propectinatites
- Properisphinctes
- Properrinites
- Propinacoceras
- Proplacenticeras
- Proplanulites
- Propopanoceras
- Proptychites
- Proptychitoides
- Prorasenia
- Prorsisphinctes
- Prosaphites
- Proshumardites
- Prosiceras
- Prososphinctes
- Prososphinctoides
- Prosphingites
- Prostacheoceras
- Protacanthoceras
- Protacanthodiscus
- Protacanthoplites
- Protaconeceras
- Protactoclymenia
- Protanclyoceras
- Protanisoceras
- Protengonoceras
- Protetragonites
- Proteusites
- Protexanites
- Prothalassoceras
- Protimanites
- Protocanites
- Protoceras
- Protoecotrausites
- Protogrammoceras
- Protohoplites
- Protophites
- Protoplatytes
- Protopopanoceras
- Protornoceras
- Protosageceras
- Protothurmannia
- Prototoceras
- Protoxyclymenia
- Protrachyceras
- Protropites
- Proturrilitoides
- Prouddenites
- Provirgatites

=== Ps ===
- Pseudacompsoceras
- Pseudaetomoceras
- Pseudagathiceras
- Pseudammatoceras
- Pseudargentiniceras
- Pseudarietites
- Pseudarisphinctes
- Pseudaspidites
- Pseudaspidoceras
- Pseudharpoceras
- Pseudhelicoceras
- Pseudhimalayites
- Pseudinvoluticeras
- Pseudoaganides
- Pseudoaspidoceras
- Pseudobactrites
- Pseudobaculites
- Pseudobarroisiceras
- Pseudobrightia
- Pseudocadoceras
- Pseudocalycoceras
- Pseudocardioceras
- Pseudocarnites
- Pseudoceltites
- Pseudoclambites
- Pseudoclydoniceras
- Pseudoclymenia
- Pseudocosmoceras
- Pseudodanubites
- Pseudofavrella
- Pseudoflemingites
- Pseudofoordites
- Pseudogarantiana
- Pseudogarnieria
- Pseudogastrioceras
- Pseudoglaphyrites
- Pseudogrammoceras
- Pseudogregoryceras
- Pseudohalorites
- Pseudohaploceras
- Pseudoinvoluticeras
- Pseudojacobites
- Pseudokatroliceras
- Pseudokossmaticeras
- Pseudokymatites
- Pseudoleymeriella
- Pseudolillia
- Pseudolioceras
- Pseudolissoceras
- Pseudomercaticeras
- Pseudoneoptychites
- Pseudonomismoceras
- Pseudoosterella
- Pseudopallasiceras
- Pseudoparalegoceras
- Pseudopeltoceras
- Pseudoperisphinctes
- Pseudophyllites
- Pseudoplacenticeras
- Pseudopolyplectus
- Pseudoppelia
- Pseudoprobeloceras
- Pseudopronorites
- Pseudopuzosia
- Pseudosageceras
- Pseudosaynella
- Pseudoschistoceras
- Pseudoschloenbachia
- Pseudosimoceras
- Pseudosirenites
- Pseudosonneratia
- Pseudosubplanitoides
- Pseudothetidites
- Pseudothurmannia
- Pseudotibetites
- Pseudotirolites
- Pseudotissotia
- Pseudotoceras
- Pseudotoites
- Pseudotropites
- Pseudovidrioceras
- Pseudovirgatites
- Pseudowaagenia
- Pseudoxybeloceras
- Pseuduptonia
- Psiloceras
- Psilocladiscites
- Psilohamites
- Psilophyllites
- Psilosturia
- Psilotissotia

=== Pt ===
- Pterolytoceras
- Pteroscaphites
- Pterosirenites
- Ptycharcestes
- Ptychites
- Ptychoceras
- Ptycholytoceras
- Ptychophylloceras

=== Pu ===
- Puchenquia
- Puebloites
- Pulchellia
- Putealiceras
- Puzosia
- Puzosigella

== Q ==
- Qiannanites
- Quasicravenoceras
- Quasintoceras
- Quenstedtoceras
- Quinnites
- Quitmannites

== R ==
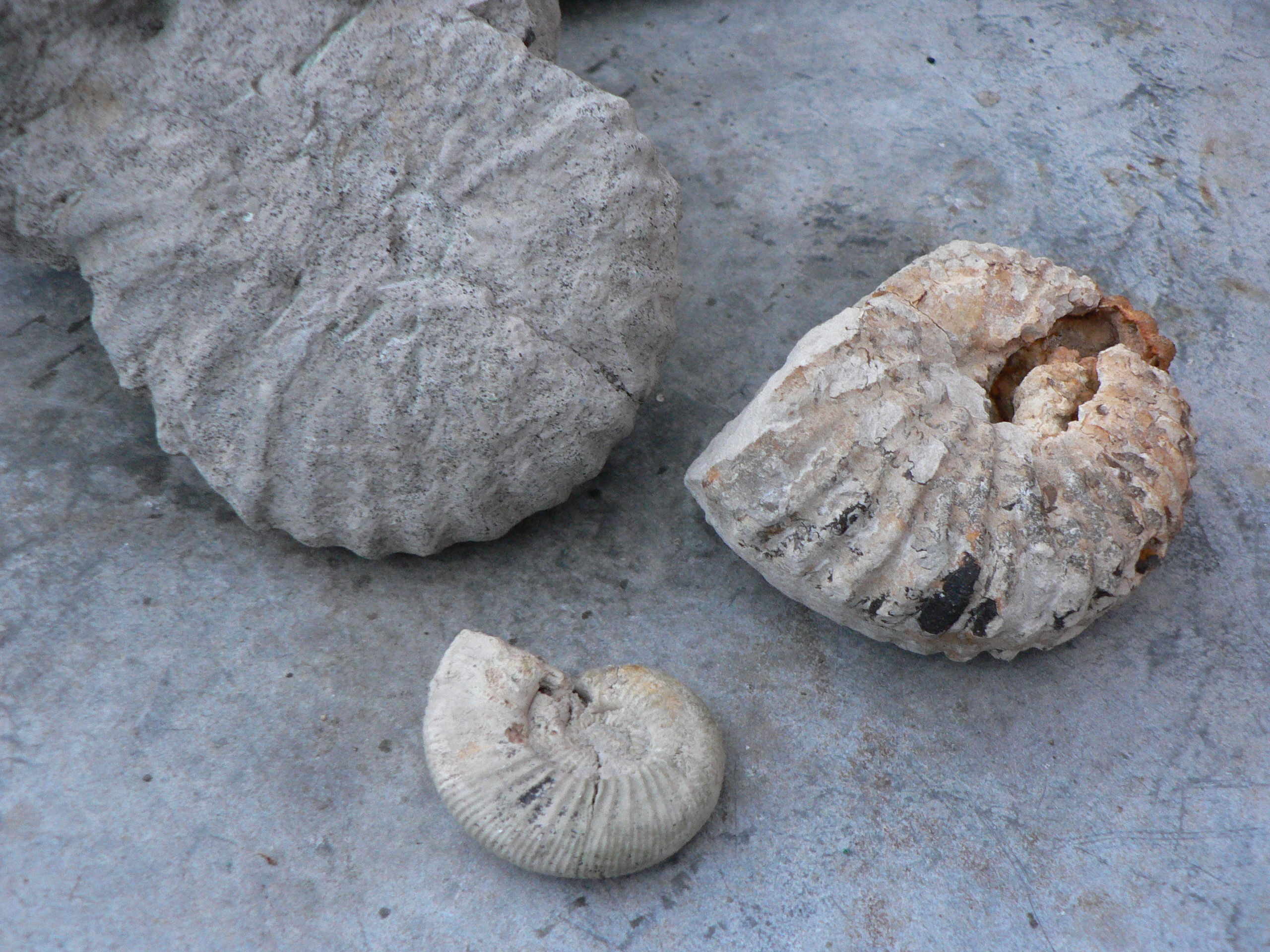
Ammonite fossils.

- Radstockiceras
- Raimondiceras
- Rakusites
- Ramosites
- Rasenia
- Rasenoides
- Raymondiceras
- Rectoclymenia
- Reesidites
- Rehmannia
- Reiflingites
- Reineckeia
- Reineckeites
- Renites
- Renziceras
- Repossia
- Reticuloceras
- Retites
- Reynesella
- Reynesoceras
- Reynesocoeloceras
- Rhabdoceras
- Rhacophyllites
- Rhadinites
- Rhaeboceras
- Rhampidoceras
- Rhiphaeoclymenia
- Rhiphaeocyclus
- Rhymmoceras
- Rhytidohoplites
- Riasanites
- Richardsonites
- Rimkinites
- Ringsteadia
- Roinghites
- Rollerites
- Rollieria
- Roloboceras
- Romaniceras
- Romanites
- Ropoloceras
- Rossalites
- Rotodiscoceras
- Rotopericyclus
- Rubroceras
- Rugiferites
- Rursiceras
- Rusoceras
- Ryugasella

== S ==
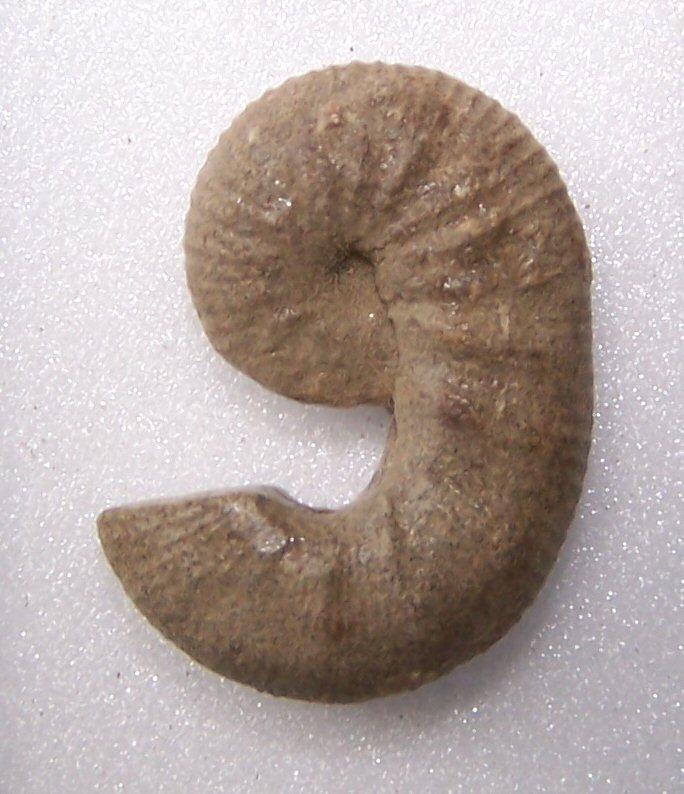
Scaphites fossil.

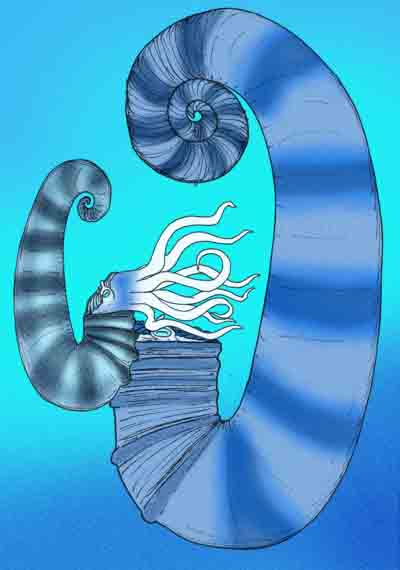
Shastoceras behemothi (front) and Annuloceras summersi (background)

=== Sa ===
- Sageceras
- Sagenites
- Saghalinites
- Sakhaites
- Sakmarites
- Salaziceras
- Salfeldiella
- Saltericeras
- Salterites
- Sandbergeroceras
- Sandlingites
- Sangzhites
- Sanmartinoceras
- Sanyangites
- Sarasinella
- Saxoceras
- Saynella
- Saynoceras

=== Sc ===
- Scalarites
- Scaphamites
- Scaphites
- Scaphitodites
- Scarburgiceras
- Schaffhauseria
- Schartymites
- Schindewolfites
- Schindewolfoceras
- Schistoceras
- Schistophylloceras
- Schloenbachia
- Schlotheimia
- Schuichengoceras
- Schwandorfia
- Sciponoceras
- Schizoclymenia
- Scoticardioceras

=== Se ===
- Sellaclymenia
- Sellagoniatites
- Sellanarcestes
- Selwynoceras
- Semenovites
- Semiformiceras
- Semiornites
- Serpianites
- Serramanticoceras
- Seymourites

=== Sh ===
- Shahrudites
- Shakraceras
- Shangraoceras
- Shaoyangoceras
- Sharpeiceras
- Shasticrioceras
- Shastoceras
- Shengoceras
- Shikhanites
- Shirbuirnia
- Shouchangoceras
- Shumardites

=== Si ===
- Siberiptychites
- Sibirites
- Sibyllites
- Sicanites
- Sicilioceras
- Siculites
- Siemiradzkia
- Sigaloceras
- Silberlingites
- Silenticeras
- Silesites
- Silesitoides
- Simaspidoceras
- Simbirskites
- Simichelloceras
- Simmoceras
- Simoceras
- Simocosmoceras
- Simonyceras
- Simosphinctes
- Simotoichites
- Sindeites
- Sinotites
- Sinzovia
- Sirenites
- Sirenotrachyceras
- Sivajiceras
- Sizilites

=== Sk ===
- Skirroceras
- Skolekostephanus

=== Sl ===
- Slatterites

=== So ===
- Sobolewia
- Sohlites
- Sokolovites
- Solenoceras
- Solgerites
- Soliclymenia
- Somaliceras
- Somalites
- Somoholites
- Sonneratia
- Sonninia
- Sornayceras
- Sosioceras
- Sowerbyceras

=== Sp ===
- Spathiceras
- Spathites
- Speetoniceras
- Sphaeroceras
- Sphaerocladiscites
- Sphaerocoeloceras
- Sphaerodomites
- Sphaeromanticoceras
- Sphaeroptychius
- Sphenarpites
- Sphenoclymenia
- Sphenodiscus
- Sphingites
- Spinammatoceras
- Spinokosmoceras
- Spinoleiophyllites
- Spiroceras
- Spirogmoceras
- Spirolegoceras
- Spiticeras
- Spitidiscus
- Sporadoceras

=== St ===
- Stacheites
- Stacheoceras
- Stantonoceras
- Stantonites
- Staufenia
- Stegoxyites
- Stehnocephalites
- Steinmannites
- Stemmatoceras
- Stenarcestes
- Stenocadoceras
- Stenoclymenia
- Stenocyclus
- Stenoglaphyrites
- Stenopharciceras
- Stenopopanoceras
- Stenopronorites
- Stephanites
- Stephanoceras
- Stikinoceras
- Stoliczkaia
- Stolleites
- Stomohamites
- Stoppaniceras
- Streblites
- Strebliticeras
- Strenoceras
- Striatosirenites
- Strigoceras
- Strigogoniatites
- Strungia
- Sturia
- Styracoceras
- Styrites

=== Su ===
- Subalpinites
- Subarcthoplites
- Subastieria
- Subbarroisiceras
- Subbonarellia
- Subcollina
- Subcolumbites
- Subcraspedites
- Subdichotomoceras
- Subgrossouvria
- Subinyoites
- Subitoceras
- Subkossmatia
- Sublithacoceras
- Sublunuloceras
- Submantelliceras
- Submeekoceras
- Submortoniceras
- Subnebrodites
- Subneumayria
- Subolenekites
- Suboosterella
- Subperrinites
- Subplanites
- Subprionocyclus
- Subpulchellia
- Subsaynella
- Subshumardites
- Substeueroceras
- Substreblites
- Subthurmannia
- Subtissotia
- Subvertebriceras
- Subvishnuites
- Sudeticeras
- Sulciferites
- Sulcimitoceras
- Sulcoclymenia
- Sulcodimorphoceras
- Sulcogirtyoceras
- Sulcohamites
- Sulcohamitoides
- Sulcohoplites
- Sundaites
- Sunites
- Surenites
- Sutneria

=== Sv ===
- Svalbardiceras
- Sverdrupites
- Svetlanoceras

=== Sy ===
- Sympolycyclus
- Synartinskia
- Syngastrioceras
- Synpharciceras
- Synuraloceras
- Synwocklumeria
- Syrdenites

== T ==
An ammonite with goniatitic sutures.

The coat of arms of the municipality of Tensfeld contains an ammonite shell and a sundew.

=== Ta ===
- Tabantalites
- Taffertia
- Talenticeras
- Tamarites
- Tapashanites
- Taramelliceras
- Tardeceras
- Tarrantoceras
- Taskanites
- Tauroceras

=== Te ===
- Tectiretites
- Tegoceras
- Teicherticeras
- Telermoceras
- Teloceras
- Telodactylites
- Telodactylus
- Temnoptychites
- Terektites
- Teshioites
- Tetragonites (syn. Epigoniceras)
- Tetrahoplites
- Tetrahoplitoides
- Tetraspidoceras
- Texanites
- Texoceras

=== Th ===
- Thallassoceras
- Thambites
- Thamboceras
- Thanamites
- Theganoceras
- Thetidites
- Thisbites
- Thomasites
- Thomelites
- Thorsteinssonoceras
- Thraxites
- Thurmannia
- Thurmanniceras

=== Ti ===
- Tibetites
- Ticinites
- Tiltoniceras
- Timanites
- Timanoceras
- Timorites
- Tirolites
- Tissotia
- Titanites
- Tithopeltoceras

=== Tj ===
- Tjururpites

=== Tm ===
- Tmaegoceras
- Tmaegophioceras
- Tmetoceras

=== To ===
- Tokurites
- Tollia
- Tolypeceras
- Tompophiceras
- Tongluceras
- Tongoboroceras
- Tonoceras
- Torcapella
- Toricellites
- Torleyoceras
- Tornia
- Tornoceras
- Tornquisites
- Tornquistites
- Torquatisphinctes
- Tovebirkelundites
- Toxamblyites
- Toxolioceras
- Tozerites

=== Tr ===
- Trachybaculites
- Trachyceras
- Trachylytoceras
- Trachyphyllites
- Trachypleuraspidites
- Trachysagenites
- Trachyscaphites
- Trachystenoceras
- Tragodesmoceras
- Tragodesmoceroides
- Tragolytoceras
- Tragophylloceras
- Tragorhacoceras
- Transicoeloceras
- Traskites
- Trenerites
- Treptocceras
- Trettinoceras
- Triaclymenia
- Triagolytoceras
- Triainoceras
- Tridentites
- Trigonogastrioceras
- Trilobiticeras
- Trimanticoceras
- Trimarginia
- Trimarginites
- Triozites
- Tritropidoceras
- Trizonoceras
- Trochleiceras
- Trochoclymenia
- Trochoceras
- Trolliceras
- Tropaeum
- Tropiceltites
- Tropidoceras
- Tropigastrites
- Tropigymnites
- Tropites
- Tropitoides
- Truyolsoceras

=== Ts ===
- Tsvetkovites

=== Tu ===
- Tuberodiscoides
- Tugurites
- Tulites
- Tumaroceras
- Tumilites
- Tunesites
- Tunglanites
- Turrilites
- Turrilitoides

=== Ty ===
- Tympanoceras
- Tyrannites

== U ==
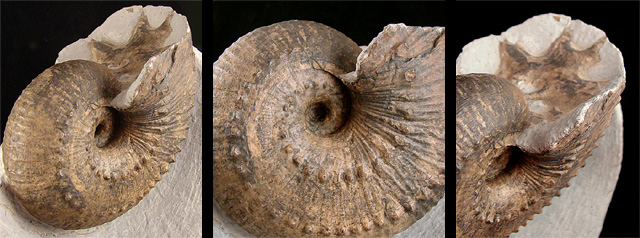
An ammonitic ammonoid with the body chamber missing, showing the septal surface (especially at right) with its undulating lobes and saddles.

- Uchtites
- Uddenites
- Uddenoceras
- Ugamites
- Uhligella
- Uhligia
- Uhligites
- Umbetoceras
- Umiaites
- Unipeltoceras
- Unquatornoceras
- Uptonia
- Urakawites
- Uraloceras
- Uraloclymenia
- Uralopronorites
- Ussuria
- Ussurites
- Utaturiceras

== V ==
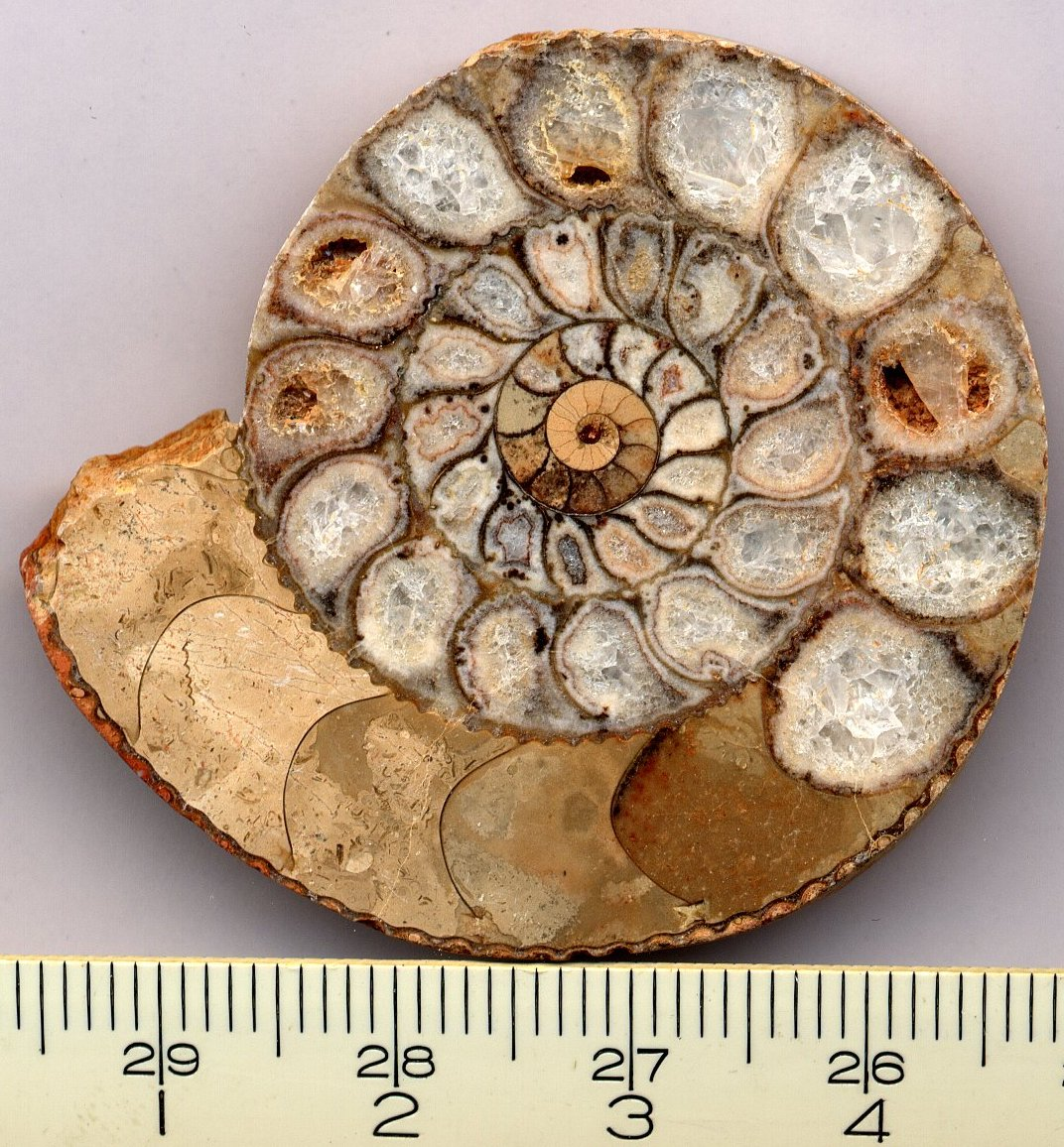
Cross-section of an English ammonite.

- Vacekia
- Valanginites
- Valdedorsella
- Valentolytoceras
- Vallites
- Vandaites
- Vascoceras
- Vavilovites
- Velebites
- Veleziceras
- Venezoliceras
- Verancoceras
- Vermiceras
- Vermisphinctes
- Verneuilites
- Vertebriceras
- Vertebrites
- Veveysiceras
- Vicininodiceras
- Vickohlerites
- Vidrioceras
- Villania
- Vinalesites
- Vinalesphinctes
- Virgataxioceras
- Virgatites
- Virgatopavlovia
- Virgatomorphites
- Virgatosimoceras
- Virgatosphinctes
- Virgatospinctoides
- Vishnuites
- Voehringerites
- Vredenburgites

== W ==
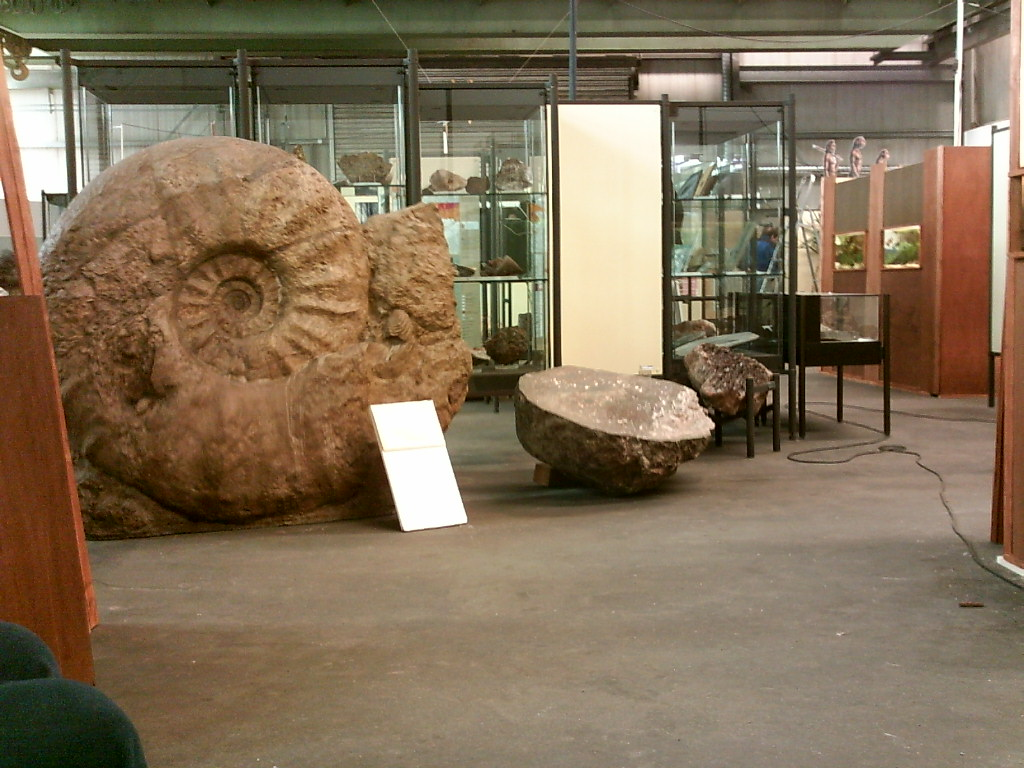
A gigantic ammonite fossil kept in a German museum.

- Waagenina
- Waagenoceras
- Waehneroceras
- Wagnericeras
- Waldthausenites
- Wangoceras
- Wasatchites
- Watinoceras
- Wedekindella
- Wellerites
- Wellsites
- Welterites
- Werneroceras
- Wewokites
- Wheatleyites
- Whitbyiceras
- Whynoticeras
- Wichmanniceras
- Wiedeyoceras
- Winchelloceras
- Windhauseniceras
- Winslowoceras
- Whynoticeras
- Wintonia
- Witchellia
- Wocklumeria
- Wopfingites
- Wordieoceras
- Worthoceras
- Wrightoceras
- Wyomingites

== X ==
- Xenoceltites
- Xenocephalites
- Xenodiscus
- Xenodrepanites
- Xipheroceras
- Xiphogymnites

== Y ==
- Yabeiceras
- Yakounia
- Yakutoceras
- Yakutoglaphyrites
- Yangites
- Yezoites
- Yinoceras
- Yokoyamaceras

== Z ==
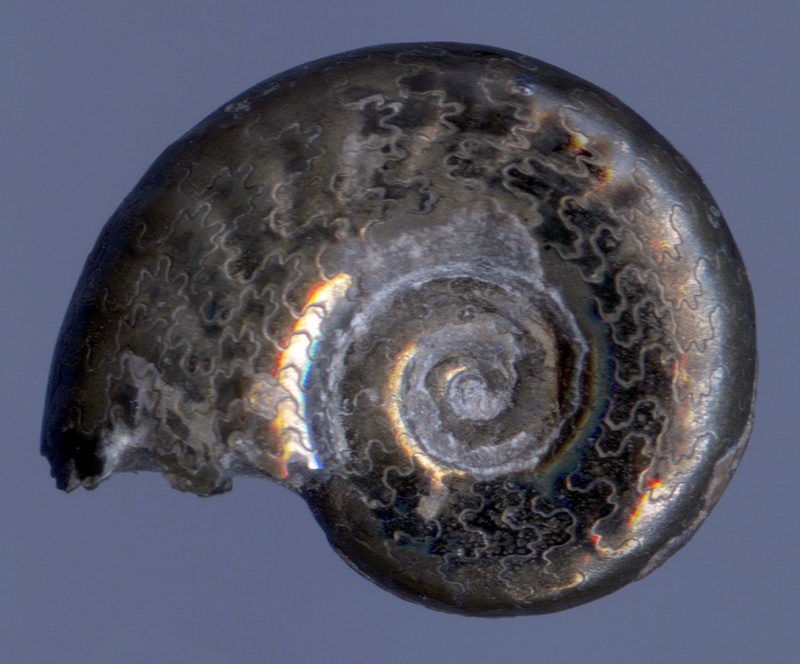
Fossil ammonite.

- Zadelsdorfia
- Zaraiskites
- Zealandites
- Zemistephanus
- Zenoites
- Zenostephanus
- Zephyroceras
- Zetoceras
- Zigzagiceras
- Ziyunites
- Zonovia
- Zuercherella
- Zugodactylites
- Zugokosmoceras
- Zuluiceras
- Zuluscaphites
- Zurcherella
- Zurcheria

== See also ==
- List of nautiloids
- List of heteromorphic ammonites
- List of belemnites
