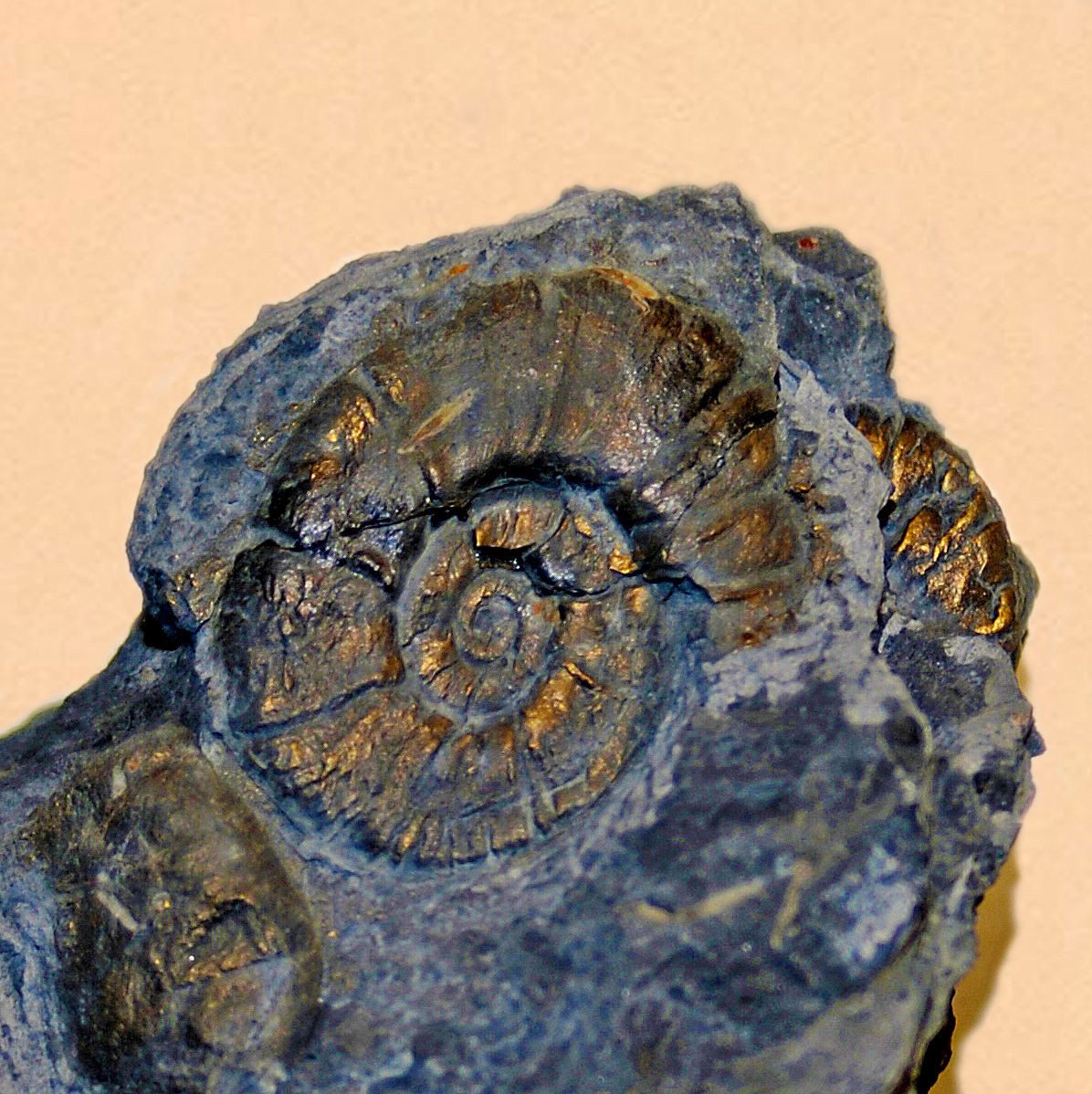
- Fossil shell of Audaxlytoceras audax from Pliensbachian of Morocco (Talsint)

Scientific classification
- Domain: Eukaryota
- Kingdom: Animalia
- Phylum: Mollusca
- Class: Cephalopoda
- Subclass: †Ammonoidea
- Order: †Ammonitida
- Family: †Lytoceratidae
- Subfamily: †Alocolytoceratinae
- Genus: †Audaxlytoceras; Fucini, 1923

Species
- A. apertum; A. audax; A. grandonense; A. spirorbis; A. varicosum

= Audaxlytoceras =

Audaxlytoceras Temporal range: Pliensbachian

Genus of molluscs (fossil)

Audaxlytoceras is an extinct genus of lytoceratid ammonites.

== Taxonomy ==
The Middle Jurassic Nannolytoceras is its closest relative. Aegolytoceras and Peripleuroceras Tutcher and Trueman 1925 are synonyms.

== Fossil record ==
This genus is known in the fossil record from the Lower Jurassic (Pliensbachian) (from about 190.8 to 182.7 million years ago). Fossils of species within this genus have been found in France, Germany, Italy, Morocco and Spain.

== Description ==
Its shell is small, smooth, evolute (all whorls showing), only slightly impressed dorsally (along the inner rim). Whorls are compressed, subquadrate in section, higher than wide, with few narrow constrictions. The suture relatively simple with a long ventral lobe and two lateral lobes.

== Bibliography ==
- Arkell et al., 1957. Mesozoic Ammonoidea, Systematic Descriptions. Treatise on Invertebrate Paleontology Part L, Ammonoidea. Geol Soc of Amer. and Univ Kans. Press. L199
- Fantini Sestini N. (1973). Revisione del genere “Audaxlytoceras” Fucini, 1923 (Ammonoidea). Rivista Italiana di Paleontologia e Stratigrafia, 79 (4): 479–502.
- Federico Venturi, Carlo Nannarone, Massimiliano Bilotta - Early Pliensbachian ammonites from the Furlo Pass (Marche, Italy): two new faunas for the middle-western Tethys

== See also ==
- List of ammonite genera
