= Asapholytoceras =

Asapholytoceras Temporal range: Toarcian

Scientific classification
- Kingdom: Animalia
- Phylum: Mollusca
- Class: Cephalopoda
- Subclass: †Ammonoidea
- Order: †Ammonitida
- Family: †Lytoceratidae
- Subfamily: †Megalytoceratinae
- Genus: †Asapholytoceras; Spath, 1927

Genus of molluscs (fossil)

Asapholytoceras is a lytoceratid ammonite, originally from the upper Lower Jurassic of southeastern Europe with high, compressed whorls and a sharp angle to the umbilical shoulder. The exposed suture has four primary lobes on either side; the internal dorsal lobe is not cruciform (i.e. shaped in a cross).

Asapholytoceras is included in the lytoceratid subfamily Megalytoceratinae, along with Metrolytoceras and Megalytoceras.
