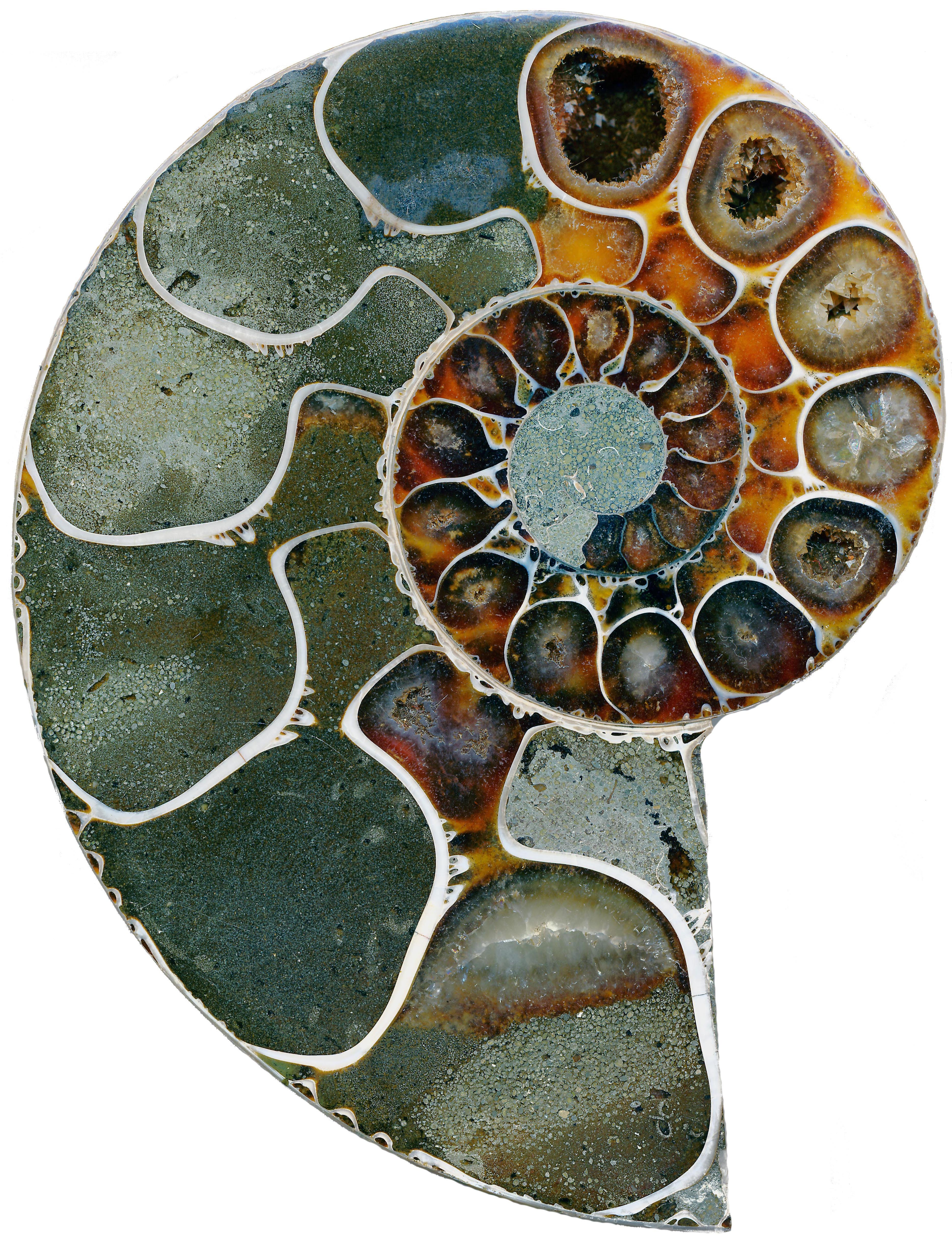
- Argonauticeras from Madagascar

Scientific classification
- Domain: Eukaryota
- Kingdom: Animalia
- Phylum: Mollusca
- Class: Cephalopoda
- Subclass: †Ammonoidea
- Order: †Ammonitida
- Family: †Lytoceratidae
- Subfamily: †Lytoceratinae
- Genus: †Argonauticeras; Anderson, 1938

= Argonauticeras =

Argonauticeras Temporal range: Aptian

Genus of molluscs (fossil)

Argonauticeras is an extinct ammonoid cephalopod genus that lived during the latter part of the Early Cretaceous, included in the Lytoceratida and found in lower and possibly middle Aptian marine sediments. It has been thought of as a subgenus of Ammonoceratites.

Argonauticeras produced an evolute shell with a trapezoidal whorl section, slightly impressed inner rim (or dorsum), a somewhat flattened outer rim (venter) and broadly arched sides, covered with fine, weakly crinkled ribs.
