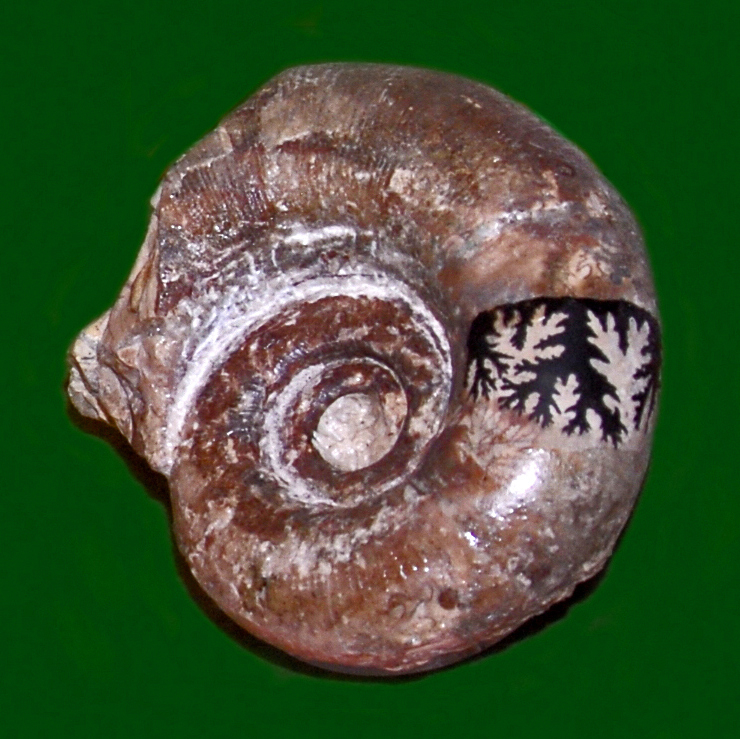
- Fossil of Lytoceras sutile from Jurassic of Italy

Scientific classification
- Domain: Eukaryota
- Kingdom: Animalia
- Phylum: Mollusca
- Class: Cephalopoda
- Subclass: †Ammonoidea
- Order: †Ammonitida
- Family: †Lytoceratidae
- Genus: †Lytoceras
- Species: †L. sutile

Binomial name
- †Lytoceras sutile Oppel, 1868

= Lytoceras sutile =

Lytoceras sutile Temporal range: Jurassic -Cretaceous

Species of mollusc (fossil)

Lytoceras sutile is an ammonite species belonging to the family Lytoceratidae. These cephalopods were fast-moving nektonic carnivores.

== Fossil record ==
Fossils of Lytoceras sutile have been found from the Jurassic to the Cretaceous (age range: from 150.8 to 136.4 million years ago). They are known from various localities of Italy, Austria and Czechoslovakia.
