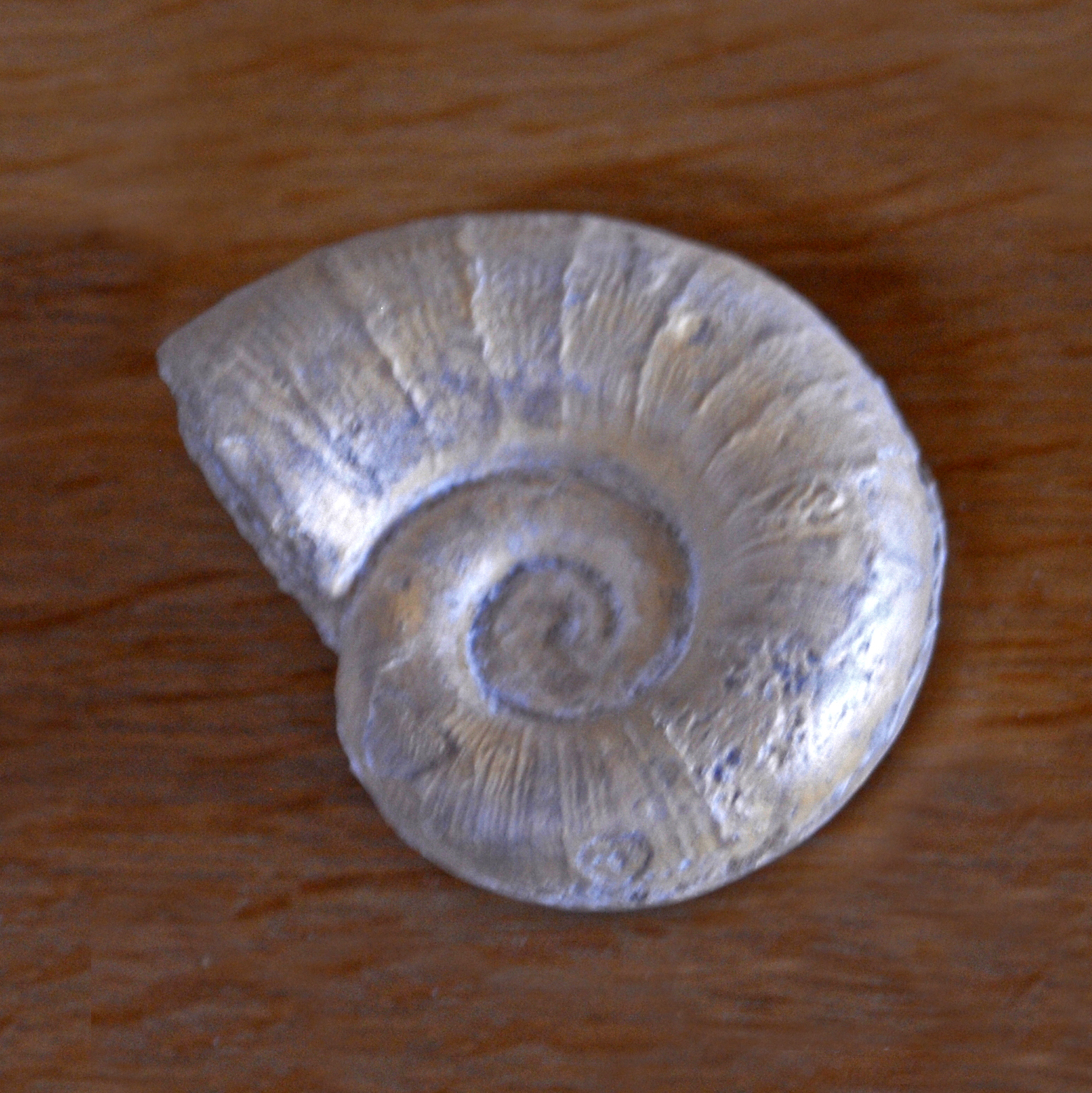
- Fossil of Lytoceras eudesianum from France, on display at Galerie de paléontologie et d'anatomie comparée in Paris

Scientific classification
- Domain: Eukaryota
- Kingdom: Animalia
- Phylum: Mollusca
- Class: Cephalopoda
- Subclass: †Ammonoidea
- Order: †Ammonitida
- Family: †Lytoceratidae
- Genus: †Lytoceras
- Species: †L. eudesianum

Binomial name
- †Lytoceras eudesianum (Orbigny, 1845)

= Lytoceras eudesianum =

Lytoceras eudesianum Temporal range: Middle Jurassic, 170–164 Ma

Species of mollusc (fossil)

Lytoceras eudesianum is an ammonite species belonging to the family Lytoceratidae. These fast-moving nektonic carnivores lived from the Bajocian age to the Bathonian age of the Middle Jurassic.

Shells of Lytoceras eudesianum can reach a diameter of 18 centimetres (7.1 in).
