= Metrolytoceras =

Metrolytoceras Temporal range: Bajocian

Scientific classification
- Kingdom: Animalia
- Phylum: Mollusca
- Class: Cephalopoda
- Subclass: †Ammonoidea
- Order: †Ammonitida
- Family: †Lytoceratidae
- Subfamily: †Megalytoceratinae
- Genus: †Metrolytoceras; Buckman, 1923

Genus of molluscs (fossil)

Metrolytoceras is an extinct cephalopod genus that lived during the Middle Jurassic, characterized by a planispiral evolute shell with smooth middle and outer whorls, flat sides and simplified sutures.

Metrolytoceras belongs to the ammonoid suborder Lytoceratina, which is typified by having intricate, moss-like sutures, and to the family Lytoceratidae. Its closest relative is Megalytoceras
