= Megalytoceras =

Megalytoceras Temporal range: Toarcian–Bajocian

Scientific classification
- Kingdom: Animalia
- Phylum: Mollusca
- Class: Cephalopoda
- Subclass: †Ammonoidea
- Order: †Ammonitida
- Family: †Lytoceratidae
- Subfamily: †Megalytoceratinae
- Genus: †Megalytoceras; Buckman, 1905

Species
- M. amplum; M. rasile; M. rubescens

Genus of molluscs (fossil)

Megalytoceras is an extinct genus of ammonite from the middle Jurassic, belonging to the suborder Lytoceratina.

The shell of Megalytoceras is evolute and grew to be fairly large, to as much as 24.5 cm. (8 3/4 in.) in diameter in M. amplum, from the Aalenian of France. Early whorls are elliptical in section and bear periodic flares. Later, or outer, whorls are smooth with convergent sides. The outer rim, or venter, is rounded. Embracement of previous whorls by the next is slight to mild. The umbilicus is rather wide, with an abrupt edge.

Megalytoceras and its close relative Metrolytoceras are included in the Megalytoceratinae

== Distribution ==
Only found at Cerro Mendez, Opalinum Zone, Andalucia (Jurassic of Spain)
