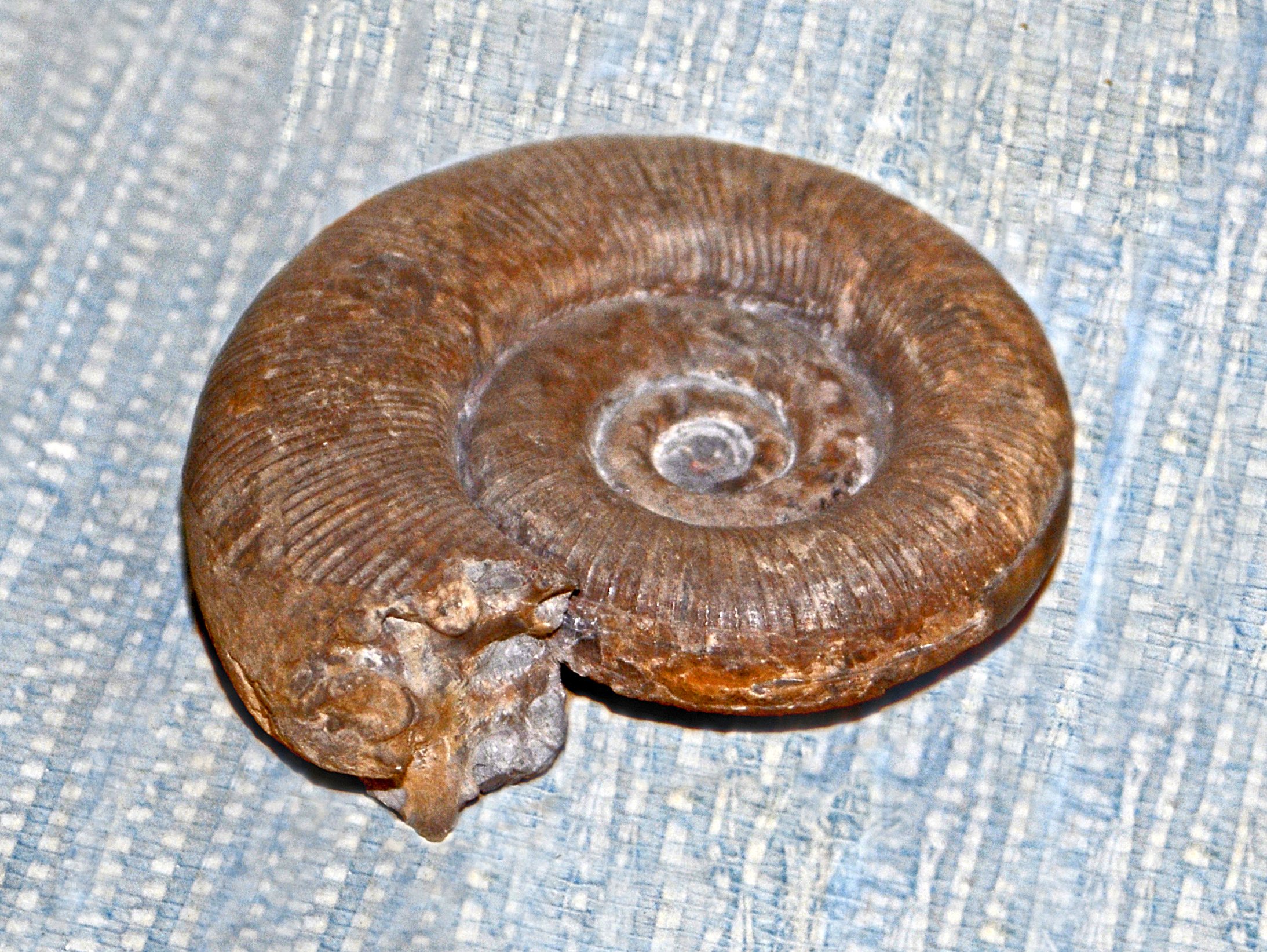
- Fossil shells of Lytoceras batesi from Shasta County, California, on display at Galerie de paléontologie et d'anatomie comparée in Paris

Scientific classification
- Domain: Eukaryota
- Kingdom: Animalia
- Phylum: Mollusca
- Class: Cephalopoda
- Subclass: †Ammonoidea
- Order: †Ammonitida
- Family: †Lytoceratidae
- Genus: †Lytoceras
- Species: †L. batesi

Binomial name
- †Lytoceras batesi Whiteaves, 1884

= Lytoceras batesi =

Lytoceras batesi Temporal range: Cretaceous

Species of mollusc (fossil)

Lytoceras batesi is an ammonite species belonging to the family Lytoceratidae. These cephalopods were fast-moving nektonic carnivores. They lived in the Cretaceous period.
