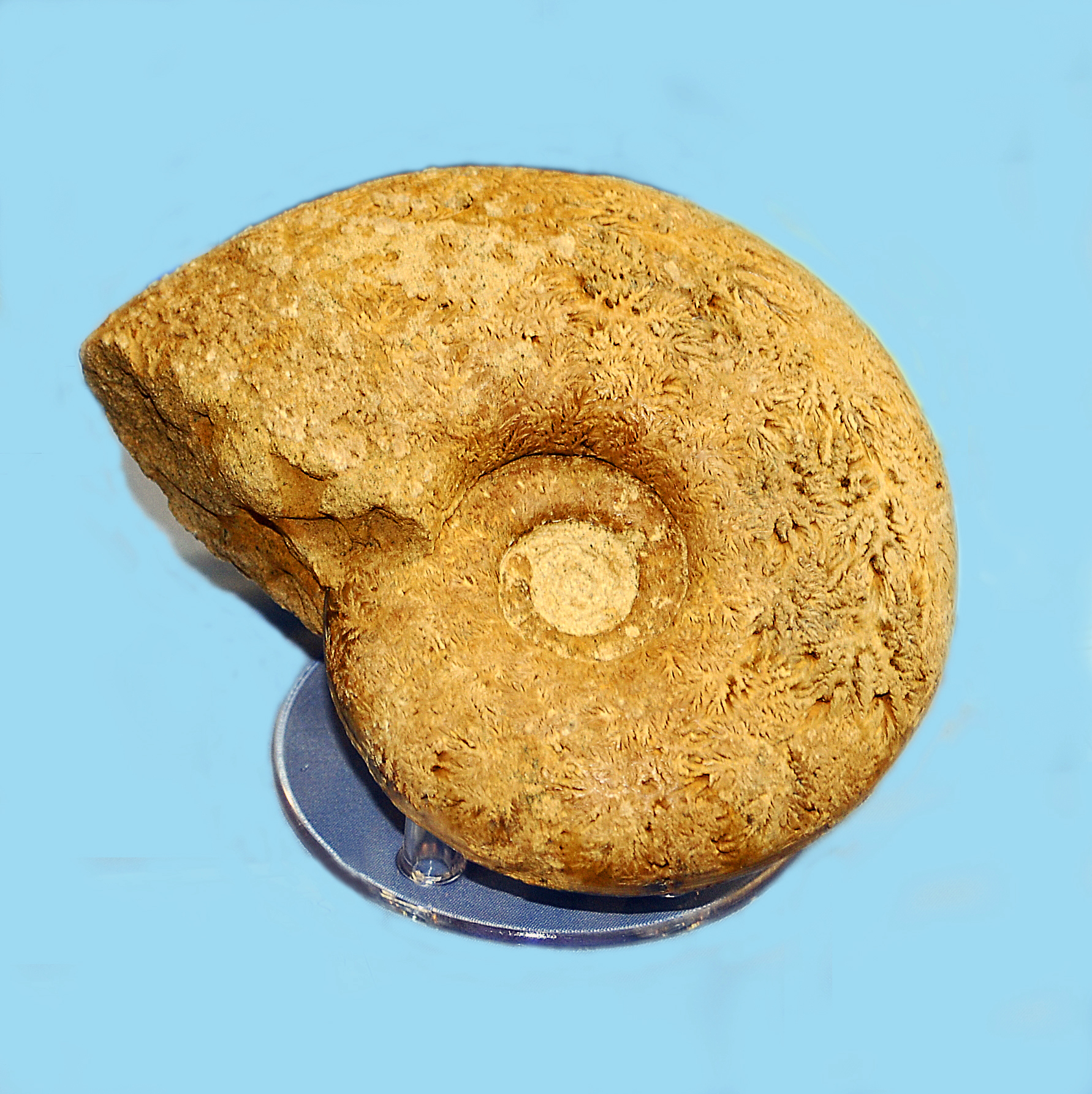
- Fossil shell of Perilytoceras species from Tulear (Madagascar)

Scientific classification
- Kingdom: Animalia
- Phylum: Mollusca
- Class: Cephalopoda
- Subclass: †Ammonoidea
- Order: †Ammonitida
- Family: †Lytoceratidae
- Subfamily: †Megalytoceratinae
- Genus: †Perilytoceras; Rulleau, 1997

= Perilytoceras =

Perilytoceras Temporal range: Upper Toarcian

Genus of molluscs (fossil)

Perilytoceras is a genus of ammonoid cephalopods belonging to the family Lytoceratidae.

These fast-moving nektonic carnivores lived in the Toarcian age (from 182.7 to 174.1 million years ago). Shells could reach a diameter of 20–25 centimetres (7.9–9.8 in).
