= Analytoceras =

Analytoceras Temporal range: Hettangian

Scientific classification
- Domain: Eukaryota
- Kingdom: Animalia
- Phylum: Mollusca
- Class: Cephalopoda
- Subclass: †Ammonoidea
- Order: †Ammonitida
- Family: †Pleuroacanthitidae
- Genus: †Analytoceras; Hyatt, 1900

Analytoceras is an extinct genus of cephalopod belonging to the Ammonite subclass that lived during the early Jurassic. Analytoceras, named by Alpheus Hyatt in 1900, is a lytoceratid and only member of the pleuroacanthitid subfamily Analytoceratinae, which has the same characters as its genus.

Shell characters: inner whorls constricted, middle with parabolic lines and conspicuous parabolic nodes, outer with sigmoidal flairs; adult body chamber with ventrolateral spines.
