= Ptycholytoceras =

Ptycholytoceras Temporal range: Toarcian

Scientific classification
- Kingdom: Animalia
- Phylum: Mollusca
- Class: Cephalopoda
- Subclass: †Ammonoidea
- Order: †Ammonitida
- Family: †Lytoceratidae
- Subfamily: †Lytoceratinae
- Genus: †Ptycholytoceras; Spath, 1927

Species
- See text

Genus of molluscs (fossil)

Ptycholytoceras is a genus of fast-moving nektonic ammonoid carnivores included in the Lytoceratinae in which the shell has round inner and depressed outer whorls and sides with dorso-ventrally sloping folds that do not pass onto the venter (outer rim).

The type species Phycholyioceras humile (Prinz), named by Spath, 1924, first described as Lytoceras humile by Prinz in 1904, came from the Lower Jurassic (Toarcian) of Hungary.
