= Bouhamidoceras =

Bouhamidoceras Temporal range: Sinemurian

Scientific classification
- Kingdom: Animalia
- Phylum: Mollusca
- Class: Cephalopoda
- Subclass: †Ammonoidea
- Order: †Ammonitida
- Family: †Lytoceratidae
- Genus: †Bouhamidoceras

Species
- B. zizense

Bouhamidoceras is an extinct genus of cephalopod belonging to the Ammonite subclass.

== Distribution ==
Jurassic deposites of Hungary and Tunisia.
