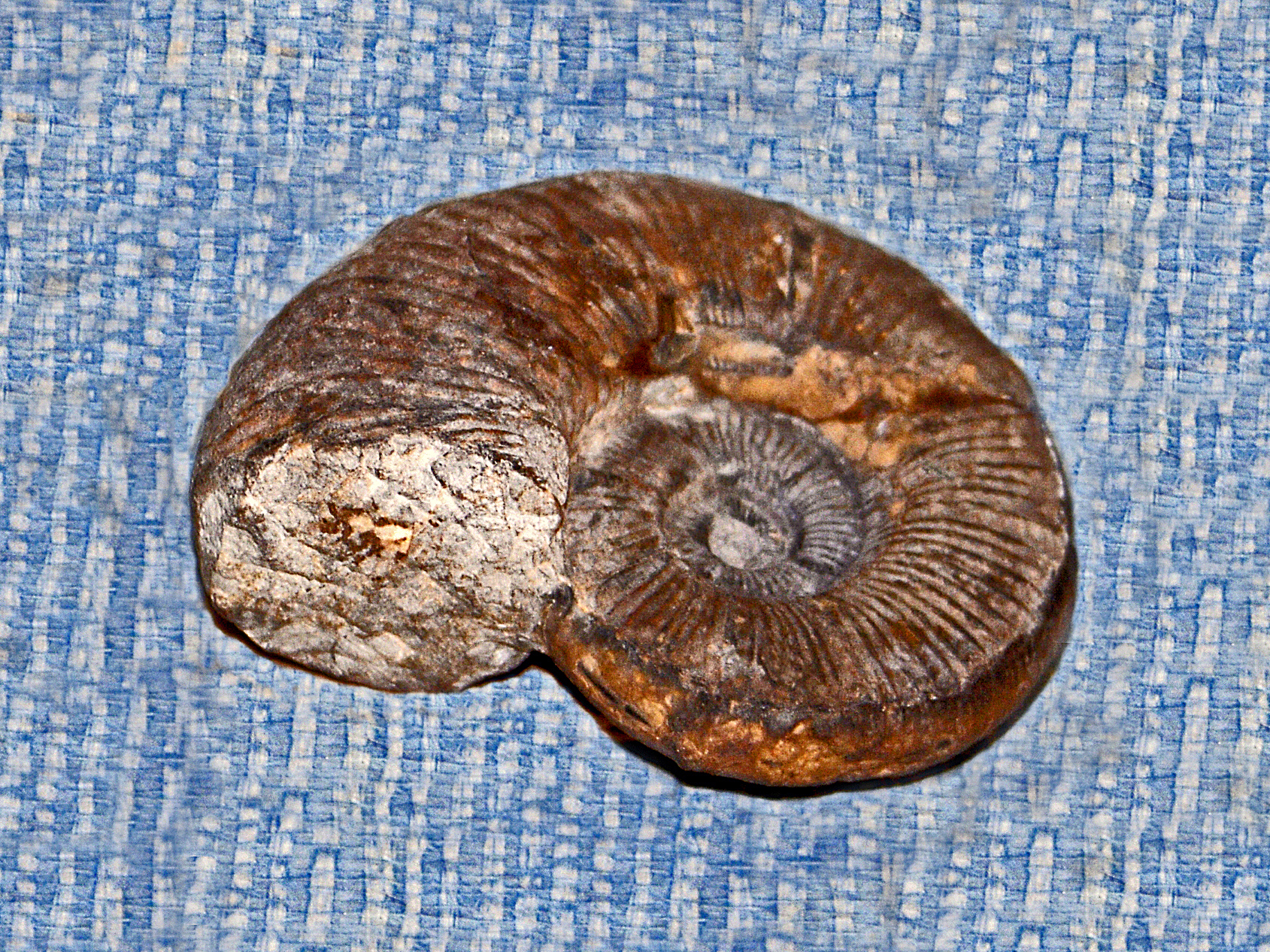
- Fossil shells of Lytoceras fimbriatum from United Kingdom, on display at Galerie de paléontologie et d'anatomie comparée in Paris

Scientific classification
- Kingdom: Animalia
- Phylum: Mollusca
- Class: Cephalopoda
- Subclass: †Ammonoidea
- Order: †Ammonitida
- Family: †Lytoceratidae
- Genus: †Lytoceras
- Species: †L. fimbriatum

Binomial name
- †Lytoceras fimbriatum Sowerby, 1817

= Lytoceras fimbriatum =

Lytoceras fimbriatum Temporal range: Jurassic 189.6–171.6 Ma

Species of mollusc (fossil)

Lytoceras fimbriatum is an ammonite species belonging to the family Lytoceratidae. These cephalopods were fast-moving nektonic carnivores. They lived in the Jurassic period.

== Description ==
Shells of Lytoceras cornucopia can reach an average diameter of about 74 millimetres (2.9 in).

== Distribution ==
Fossils of species within this genus have been found in the Jurassic rocks of France, Germany, Hungary, Morocco, Portugal, Spain, Tunisia, Turkey, United Kingdom and United States.
