= Adnethiceras =

Adnethiceras Temporal range: 196.5–189.6 Ma

Scientific classification
- Kingdom: Animalia
- Phylum: Mollusca
- Class: Cephalopoda
- Subclass: †Ammonoidea
- Order: †Ammonitida
- Family: †Lytoceratidae
- Genus: †Adnethiceras

Extinct genus of molluscs

Adnethiceras is an extinct genus of Ammonite.

== Distribution ==
Jurassic deposites in Austria and Hungary.
