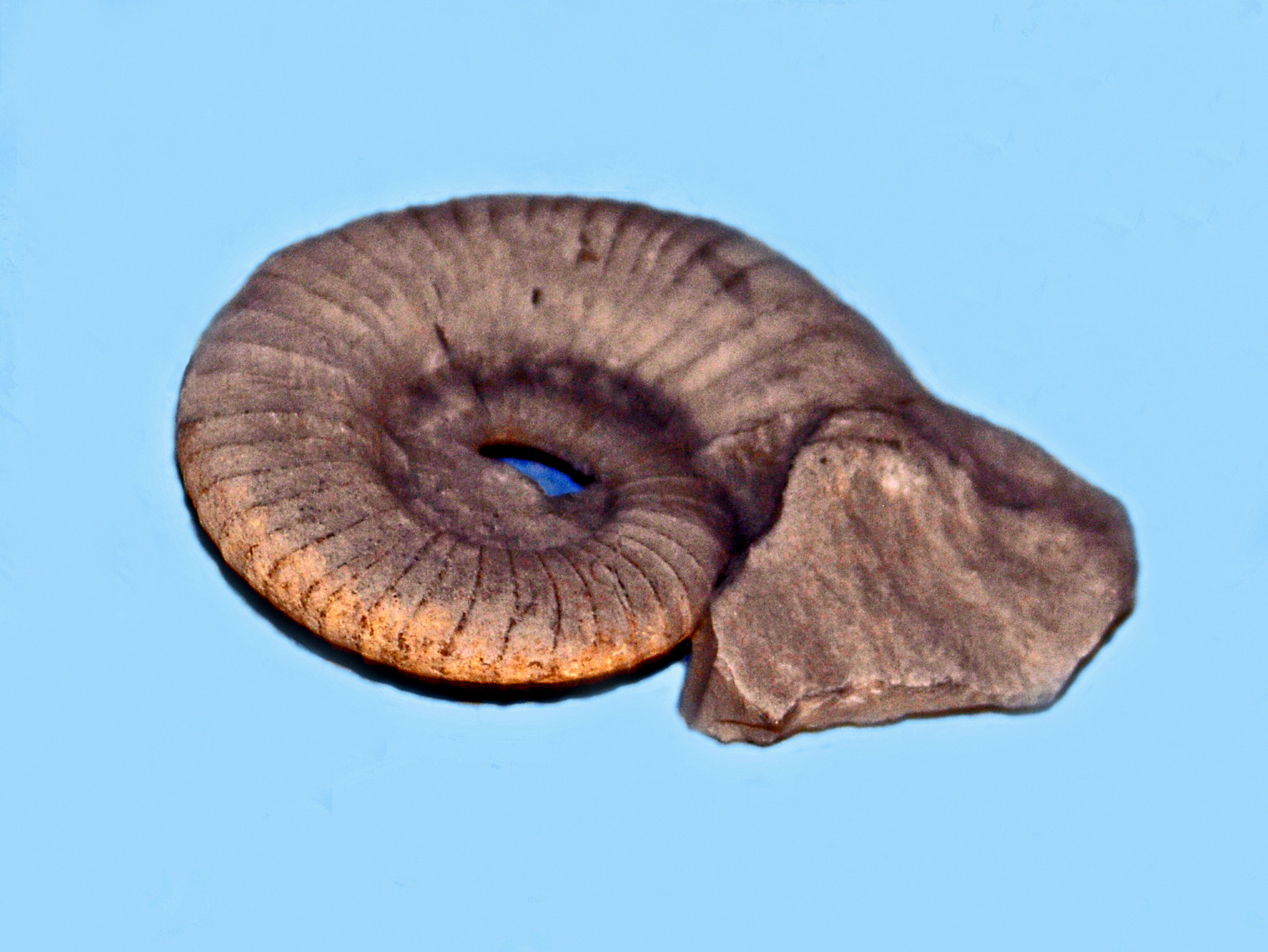
- Fossil shells of Eulytoceras phestum from Alpes-de-Haute-Provence, on display at Galerie de paléontologie et d'anatomie comparée in Paris

Scientific classification
- Domain: Eukaryota
- Kingdom: Animalia
- Phylum: Mollusca
- Class: Cephalopoda
- Subclass: †Ammonoidea
- Order: †Ammonitida
- Family: †Lytoceratidae
- Subfamily: †Lytoceratinae
- Genus: †Eulytoceras; Spath, 1927

= Eulytoceras =

Eulytoceras Temporal range: Cretaceous, 130.0–99.7 Ma

Genus of molluscs (fossil)

Eulytoceras is an extinct genus of ammonoid cephalopods belonging to the family Lytoceratidae. These fast-moving nektonic carnivores lived in the Cretaceous period, from Hauterivian age to Barremian age.

== Species ==
- Eulytoceras anisoptychum Uhlig, 1883
- Eulytoceras inaequalicostatus d'Orbigny, 1840
- Eulytoceras phestum Matheron, 1878

== Description ==
Shells of Eulytoceras species reach a diameter of about 72–140 millimetres (2.8–5.5 in).

== Distribution ==
Fossils of species within this genus have been found in the Cretaceous rocks of Antarctica, Austria, Canada, Italy, Madagascar, South Africa and Spain.
