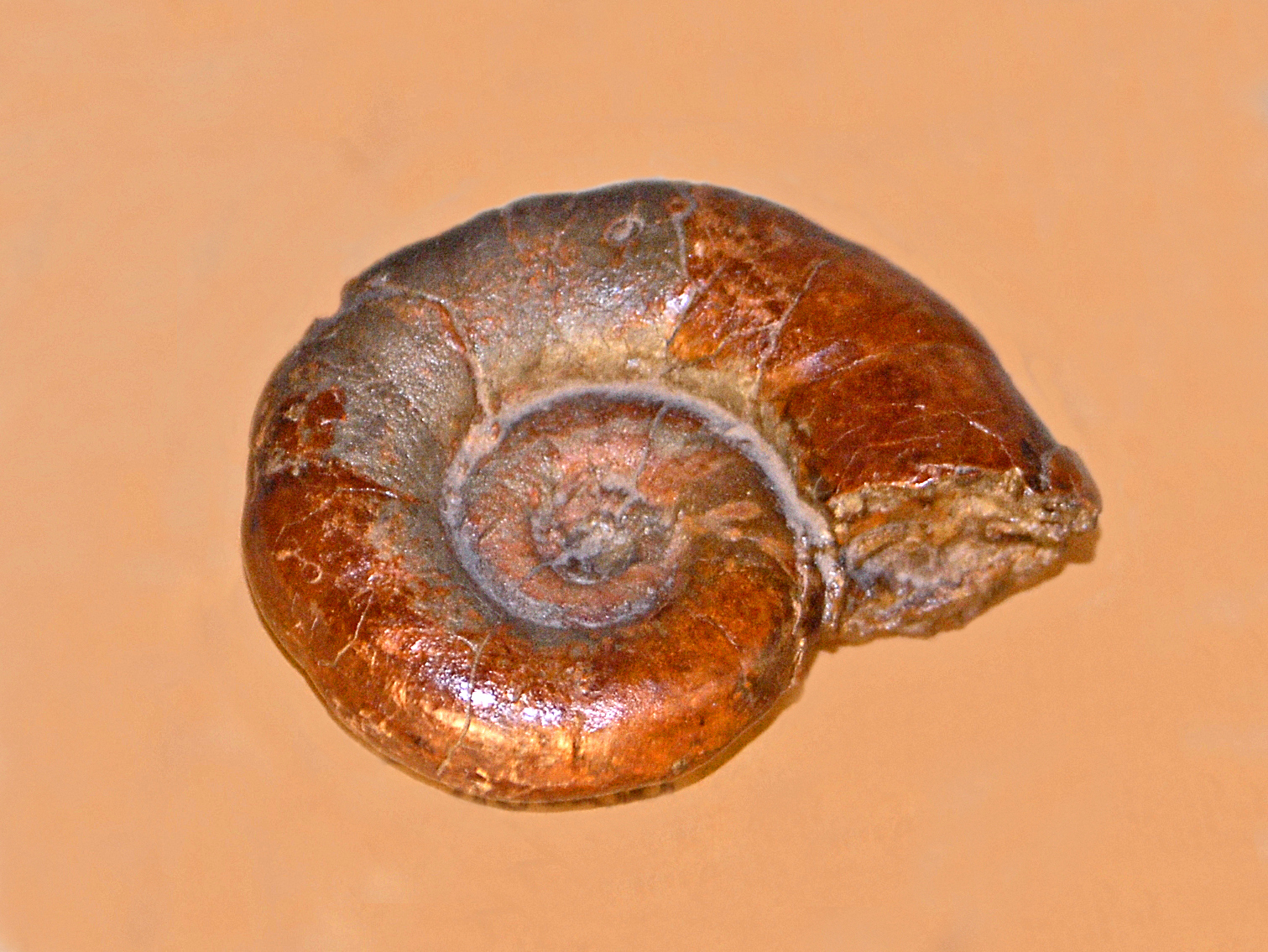
- Fossil shells of Protetragonites obliquestrangulatum from Alpes-de-Haute-Provence, on display at Galerie de paléontologie et d'anatomie comparée in Paris

Scientific classification
- Domain: Eukaryota
- Kingdom: Animalia
- Phylum: Mollusca
- Class: Cephalopoda
- Subclass: †Ammonoidea
- Order: †Ammonitida
- Family: †Lytoceratidae
- Subfamily: †Lytoceratinae
- Genus: †Protetragonites; Hyatt, 1900

Synonyms
- Hemitetragonites Spath, 1927; Leptotetragonites Spath, 1927

= Protetragonites =

Protetragonites Temporal range: from Jurassic to Cretaceous, 150.8–94.3 Ma

Genus of molluscs (fossil)

Protetragonites is an extinct genus of ammonoid cephalopods belonging to the family Lytoceratidae. These fast-moving nektonic carnivores lived from the Jurassic period Tithonian age to the Cretaceous period Aptian age.

== Species ==
- Protetragonites crebrisulcatus Uhlig, 1883
- Protetragonites obliquestrangulatum (Kilian, 1889)
- Protetragonites quadrisulcatus d'Orbigny, 1841
- Protetragonites zuegeli Maisch & Salfinger-Maisch, 2016

== Description ==
Shells of Protetragonites species reach a diameter of about 50 millimetres (2.0 in). Shells show few constrictions and a circular or triangular section.

== Distribution ==
Fossils of species within this genus have been found in the Cretaceous rocks of Austria, Canada, Czech Republic, Slovakia, Dominican Republic, France, Hungary, Madagascar, Morocco, Poland, Spain, Russia, Ukraine, Western Sahara, as well in the Jurassic of Germany, Hungary and Italy.
