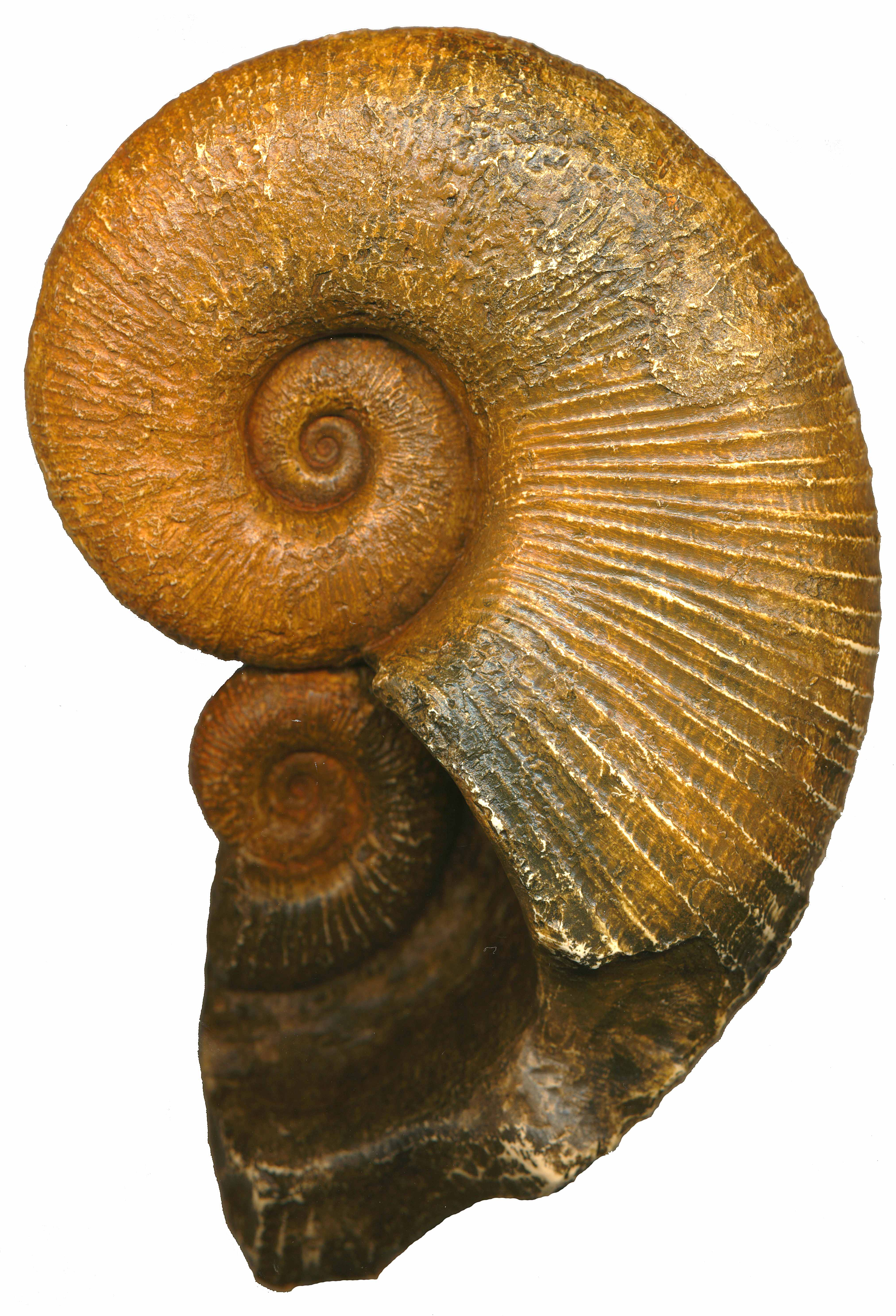
- Lobolytoceras siemensi

Scientific classification
- Domain: Eukaryota
- Kingdom: Animalia
- Phylum: Mollusca
- Class: Cephalopoda
- Subclass: †Ammonoidea
- Order: †Ammonitida
- Family: †Lytoceratidae
- Subfamily: †Alocolytoceratinae
- Genus: †Lobolytoceras; Buckman, 1923

= Lobolytoceras =

Lobolytoceras Temporal range: Toarcian

Genus of molluscs (fossil)

Lobolytoceras is an extinct genus of ammonite in which only the inner whorls have large swollen ribs, later whorls have wrinkled growth lines which coarsen somewhat, near the aperture. The genus is known from the Lower Jurassic Toarcian of Europe. The type species L. siemensi (Denck) came from the Upper Toarcian of Germany.
