= Megalytoceratinae =

Megalytoceratinae Temporal range: Toarcian - Bajocian

Scientific classification
- Domain: Eukaryota
- Kingdom: Animalia
- Phylum: Mollusca
- Class: Cephalopoda
- Subclass: †Ammonoidea
- Order: †Ammonitida
- Family: †Lytoceratidae
- Subfamily: †Megalytoceratinae; Spath, 1927

Genera
- ?Asapholytoceras; Megalytoceras; Metrolytoceras; Perilytoceras Rulleau, 1997

Extinct subfamily of ammonites

Megalytoceratinae is a subfamily of lytoceratids ammonites consisting of planulate forms, i.e. those with moderately evolute compressed shells with bluntly rounded venters, in which the outer whorls become smooth and sutures tend to resemble those of the Perisphinctidae. The family includes three genera, Megalytoceras, and Metrolytoceras, from the Middle Bajocian of England, Perilytoceras from the Toarcian and a fourth possible member, Asapholytoceras, from the Toacian of southeastern Europe.
