= Pleuroacanthitidae =

Pleuroacanthitidae Temporal range: Early Jurassic

Scientific classification
- Domain: Eukaryota
- Kingdom: Animalia
- Phylum: Mollusca
- Class: Cephalopoda
- Subclass: †Ammonoidea
- Order: †Ammonitida
- Suborder: †Lytoceratina
- Family: †Pleuroacanthitidae; Hyatt, 1900

Family of molluscs (fossil)

Pleuroacanthitidae is a small family of Lower Jurassic ammonoids that combines some characters of the Lytoceratina, Phylloceratina, and earliest Ammonitida, as well as special characters of its own. It is subdivided (Arkell et al., 1957) into two subfamilies, each represented by a single genus, the Pleuroacanthitinae containing Pleuroacanthites and the Analytoceratinae containing Analytoceras.
