= Pleuroacanthites =

Pleuroacanthites Temporal range: Hettangian

Scientific classification
- Kingdom: Animalia
- Phylum: Mollusca
- Class: Cephalopoda
- Subclass: †Ammonoidea
- Order: †Ammonitida
- Family: †Pleuroacanthitidae
- Genus: †Pleuroacanthites; Canavari, 1883

Species
- Pleuroacanthites biformis Sowerby, 1831; Pleuroacanthites charlottensis Longridge et al., 2008

Genus of molluscs (fossil)

Pleuroacanthites is one of two genera included in the Early Jurassic Pleuroacanthitidae and sole representative of the subfamily Pleuroacanthitinae. The shell of Pleuroacanthites is very evolute, with numerous whorls subcircular in section becoming incipiently keeled in the adult. Early whorls have parabolic nodes, later whorls are covered with oblique line which form a long ventral sinus. Sutures have lytoceratid (moss-like) lobes but more or less phylloid saddle endings.

== Distribution ==
Jurassic deposits in British Columbia, China and Alaska
