= Alocolytoceras =

Alocolytoceras Temporal range: Toarcian

Scientific classification
- Domain: Eukaryota
- Kingdom: Animalia
- Phylum: Mollusca
- Class: Cephalopoda
- Subclass: †Ammonoidea
- Order: †Ammonitida
- Family: †Lytoceratidae
- Subfamily: †Alocolytoceratinae
- Genus: †Alocolytoceras; Hyatt, 1900

Genus of molluscs (fossil)

Alocolytoceras is a lytoceratid ammonite with whorls that pass during growth from round to oval, rounded-quadrate, or compressed; with about 19 deep constrictions per whorl, with as many as 21 sharp ribs in between. The shell is evolute. All whorls are visible from either side.

Alocolytoceras belongs to the lytoceratid subfamily Alocolytoceratinae, which also includes Pachylytoceras and Pleurolytoceras. It is known from the upper Lower Jurassic of Europe and the Himalaya.
