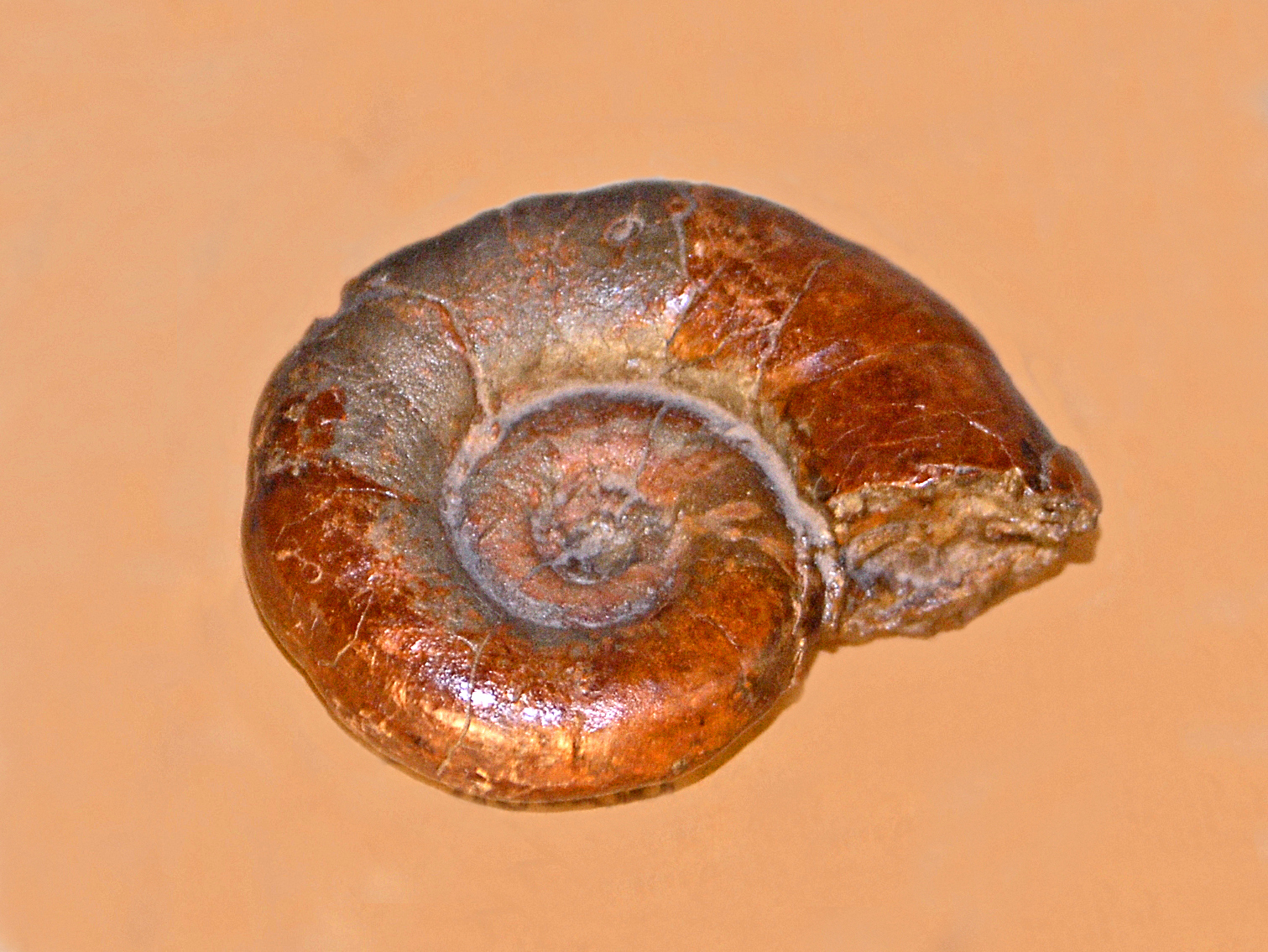
- Fossil shells of Protetragonites obliquestrangulatum from Alpes-de-Haute-Provence, on display at Galerie de paléontologie et d'anatomie comparée in Paris

Scientific classification
- Kingdom: Animalia
- Phylum: Mollusca
- Class: Cephalopoda
- Subclass: †Ammonoidea
- Order: †Ammonitida
- Family: †Lytoceratidae
- Subfamily: †Lytoceratinae; Neumayr,1875

Genera
- Ammonoceratites Bowditch, 1822; Argonauticeras Anderson, 1938; Carinolytoceras Wiedmann, 1962; Eulytoceras Spath, 1927; Hemilytoceras Spath, 1927; Lytoceras Suess, 1865; Metalytoceras Spath, 1927; Pictetia Uhlig, 1883; Protetragonites Hyatt, 1900; Pterolytoceras Spath, 1927; Ptycholytoceras

= Lytoceratinae =

Lytoceratinae Temporal range: Pliensbachian - Cenomanian

Extinct subfamily of molluscs

Lytoceratinae is a subfamily of ammonoid cephalopods that make up part of the family Lytoceratidae.

== Description ==
They are characterized by shells in which the whorls bear growth lines or lamellar folds, or both, commonly corresponding to constrictions in the internal mold. The external suture, that not lying against the previous whorl, has two lateral lobes (per side), the first being much larger. The internal lobe, which lies against the previous whorl, has a cruciform dorsal lobe.

== Fossil range ==
Lytoceratinae has a long stratigraphic and temporal range (196.5 to 89.3 Ma) extending from the Early Jurassic Pliensbachian to the Late Cretaceous Cenomanian, although most included genera have much shorter ranges.

Lytoceras, the type genus, ranges from Early Jurassic to early late Cretaceous.

Ptycholytoceras is confined to the Early Jurassic Toarcian, while Hemilytoceras is present in the Late Jurassic Oxfordian-Tithonian.

Five genera are known from the Early Cretaceous. Pterolytoceras and Metalytoceras from the Valanginian (Petrolytoceras may extend back to the Tithonian), Eulytoceras from the Hauterivian - Barremian, Argonauticeras and Pictetia from the Aptian - Albian. Ammonoceratites ranges from the Aptian to the Cenomanian.
