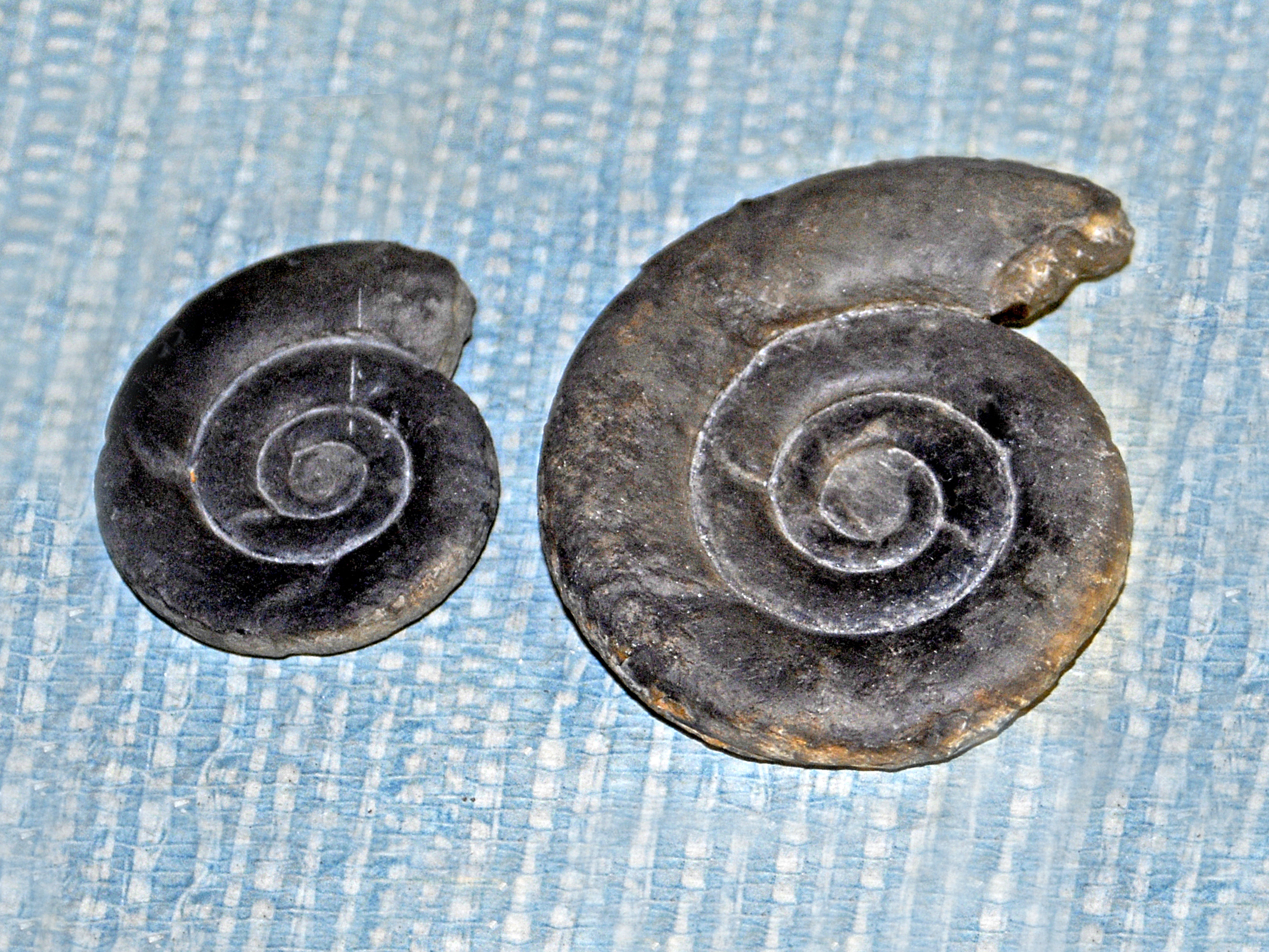
- Fossil shells of Nannolytoceras tripartitum from Alpes-de-Haute-Provence, on display at Galerie de paléontologie et d'anatomie comparée in Paris

Scientific classification
- Domain: Eukaryota
- Kingdom: Animalia
- Phylum: Mollusca
- Class: Cephalopoda
- Subclass: †Ammonoidea
- Order: †Ammonitida
- Suborder: †Lytoceratina
- Family: †Nannolytoceratidae; Spath, 1927

Genera
- Nannolytoceras Buckman, 1905

= Nannolytoceratidae =

Nannolytoceratidae Temporal range: Middle Jurassic, 175.6–171.6 Ma

Family of molluscs (fossil)

Nannolytoceratidae is a taxonomic family of ammonoid cephalopods belonging to the suborder Lytoceratina.
