= Alocolytoceratinae =

Alocolytoceratinae Temporal range: Toarcian–Bajocian

Scientific classification
- Domain: Eukaryota
- Kingdom: Animalia
- Phylum: Mollusca
- Class: Cephalopoda
- Subclass: †Ammonoidea
- Order: †Ammonitida
- Family: †Lytoceratidae
- Subfamily: †Alocolytoceratinae; Spath,1927

Genera
- Alocolytoceras; Audaxlytoceras; Derolytoceras; Lobolytoceras; Pachylytoceras; Pleurolytoceras

Extinct subfamily of molluscs

Alocolytoceratinae is a subfamily of lytoceratids that comprises genera characterized by many deep constrictions in the shell resulting in capricorn-like (goat's horm) ornamention, especially in the middle whorls, but becoming smooth and more involute in the outer whorls. Saddle endings in the suture tend to be phylloid, (leaf-like).

Alcolytocerainae includes Alocolytoceras, Lobolytoceras, Pachylytocras, and Pleurolytoceras, which are mostly from the Toarcian. One genus, Pachylotoceras, extends into the lower Bajocian.
