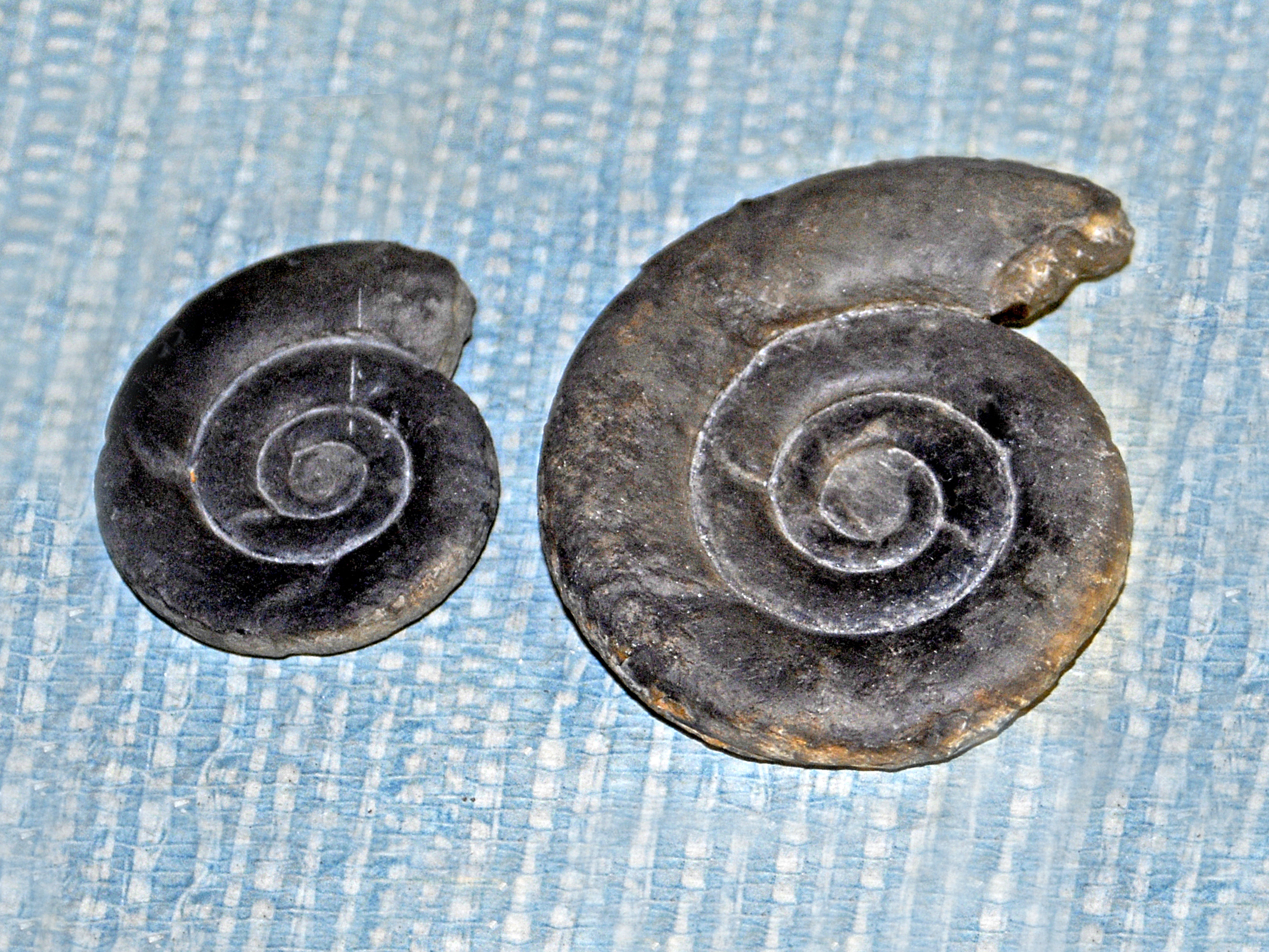
- Fossil shells of Nannolytoceras tripartitum from Alpes-de-Haute-Provence, on display at Galerie de paléontologie et d'anatomie comparée in Paris

Scientific classification
- Kingdom: Animalia
- Phylum: Mollusca
- Class: Cephalopoda
- Subclass: †Ammonoidea
- Order: †Ammonitida
- Family: †Nannolytoceratidae
- Genus: †Nannolytoceras; Buckman, 1905

= Nannolytoceras =

Nannolytoceras Temporal range: Bajocian–Bathonian

Genus of molluscs (fossil)

Nannolytoceras is an extinct genus of lytoceratid ammonite, family Lytoceratidae, with a stratigraphic range extending from the Bajocian age to Bathonian age (Medium Jurassic).

== Description ==
Shells of Nannolytoceras species reach a diameter of about 46–75 millimetres (1.8–3.0 in). The shell is evolute, smooth, tubular to compressed, with a variable number of more or less regularly spaced deep constrictions. The very thin ribs crossing the ventral region are barely visible. Umbilicus is relatively large. The suture line is of ammonitic type. These cephalopods were fast-moving nektonic carnivores.

== Distribution ==
Fossils of species within this genus have been found in the Jurassic rocks of Italy, Spain, Slovakia, and France.
