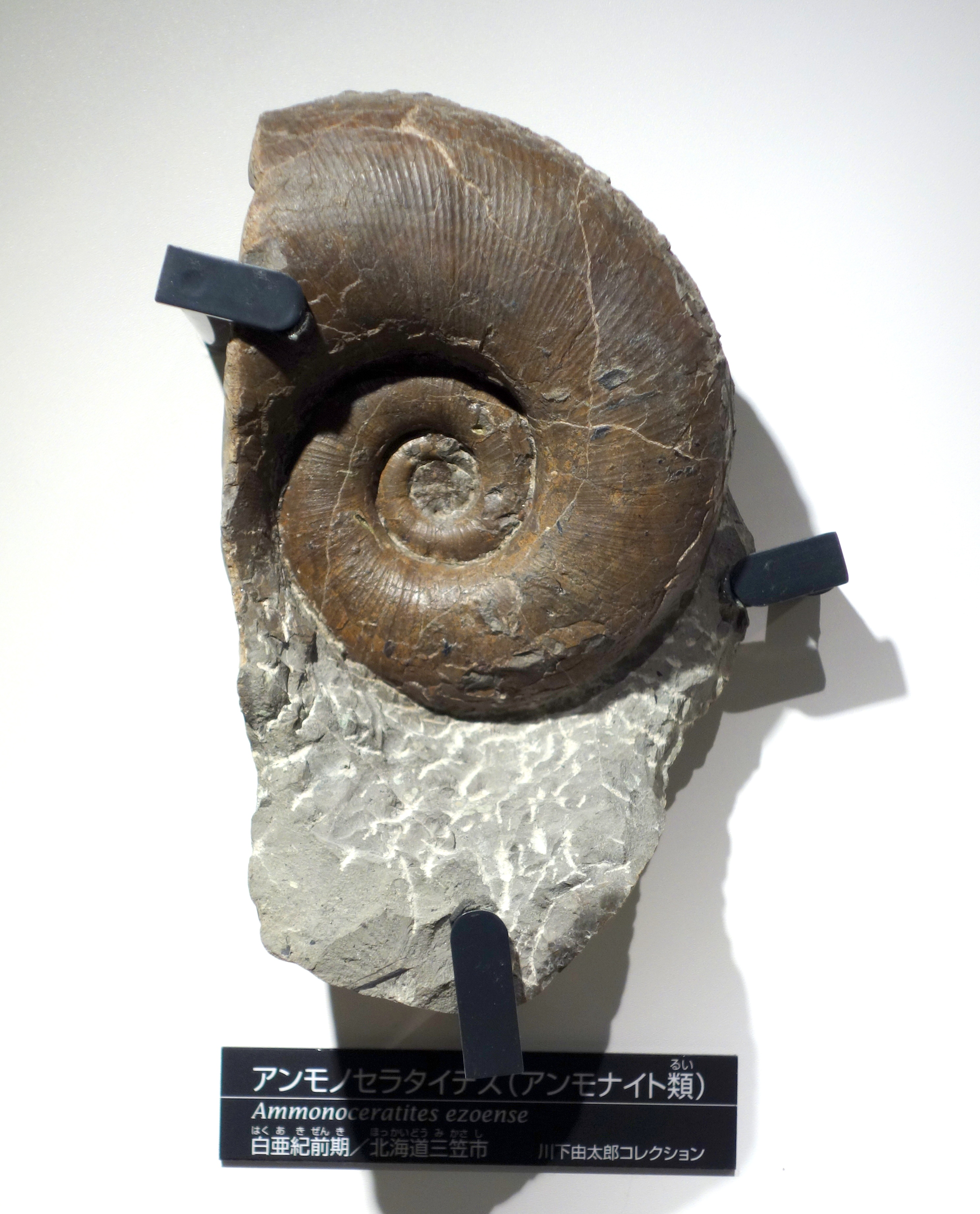
- Ammonoceratites ezoense

Scientific classification
- Domain: Eukaryota
- Kingdom: Animalia
- Phylum: Mollusca
- Class: Cephalopoda
- Subclass: †Ammonoidea
- Order: †Ammonitida
- Family: †Lytoceratidae
- Subfamily: †Lytoceratinae
- Genus: †Ammonoceratites; Bowditch 1822

Species
- A. crenocostatus; A. lamarcki; Lytoceras (Ammonoceratites) betiokyense

= Ammonoceratites =

Ammonoceratites Temporal range: Albian

Genus of molluscs (fossil)

Ammonoceratites is an extinct genus of ammonoid cephalopod known from the Albian (upper Lower Cretaceous) of British Columbia, Madagascar, New Zealand, and Japan, included in the Lytoceratidae.

The shell of Ammonoceratites is evolute, smooth, moderately expanded; the inner rim (dorsum) only slightly impressed; whorl section subcircular. It is similar to that of Lytoceras which has transverse ribbing and to that of Pictetia which is gyroconic (whorls not touching) and more strongly expanded.
