= Hemilytoceras =

Hemilytoceras Temporal range: Tithonian

Scientific classification
- Domain: Eukaryota
- Kingdom: Animalia
- Phylum: Mollusca
- Class: Cephalopoda
- Subclass: †Ammonoidea
- Order: †Ammonitida
- Family: †Lytoceratidae
- Subfamily: †Lytoceratinae
- Genus: †Hemilytoceras; Spath, 1927

Species
- See text

Genus of molluscs (fossil)

Hemilytoceras is a lytoceratin ammonite genus with round inner whorls, outer whorls becoming depressed and in some developing high lamellae (ribs) that bend forward over the venter. The type species H. immanae came from the Tithonian of Europe. The genus is known from the overall Upper Jurassic of central and southern Europe, North Africa, and western India.
