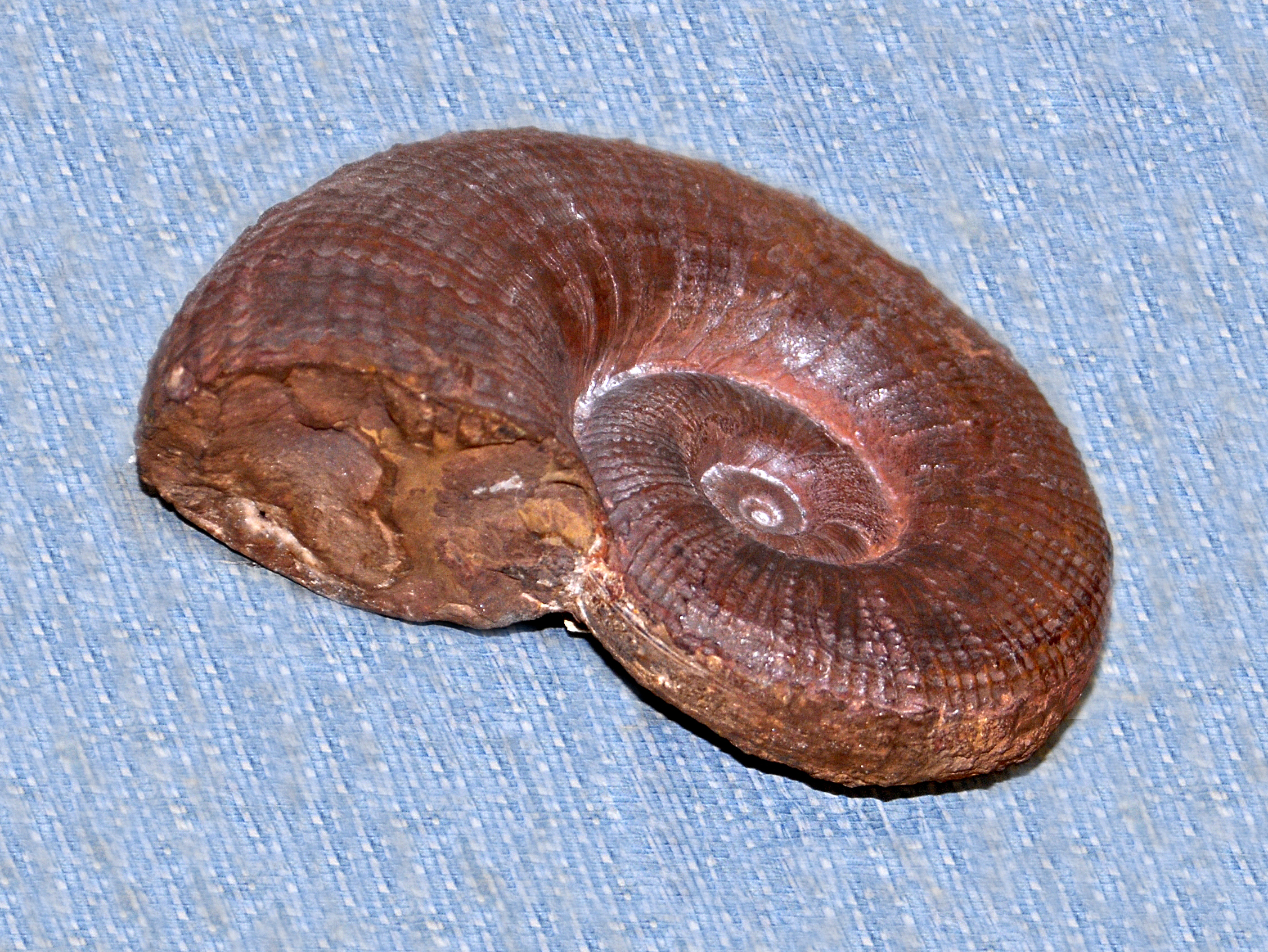
- Fossil shells of Lytoceras cornucopia from Isère (France), on display at Galerie de paléontologie et d'anatomie comparée in Paris

Scientific classification
- Domain: Eukaryota
- Kingdom: Animalia
- Phylum: Mollusca
- Class: Cephalopoda
- Subclass: †Ammonoidea
- Order: †Ammonitida
- Family: †Lytoceratidae
- Genus: †Lytoceras
- Species: †L. cornucopia

Binomial name
- †Lytoceras cornucopia Young and Bird, 1822

= Lytoceras cornucopia =

Lytoceras cornucopia Temporal range: Jurassic (Upper Lias), 183.0–175.6 Ma

Species of mollusc (fossil)

Lytoceras cornucopia is an ammonite species belonging to the family Lytoceratidae. These cephalopods were fast-moving nektonic carnivores. They lived in the Jurassic period.

== Description ==
Shells of Lytoceras cornucopia can reach an average diameter of about 140 millimetres (5.5 in).

== Distribution ==
Fossils of species within this genus have been found in the Jurassic rocks of France, Hungary, Italy, Luxembourg and United Kingdom.
