= Aegolytoceras =

Aegolytoceras Temporal range: Pliensbachian

Conservation status
- Extinct

Scientific classification
- Domain: Eukaryota
- Kingdom: Animalia
- Phylum: Mollusca
- Class: Cephalopoda
- Subclass: †Ammonoidea
- Genus: †Aegolytoceras

Extinct genus of ammonites

Aegolytoceras is an extinct genus of cephalopod belonging to the Ammonite subclass.
