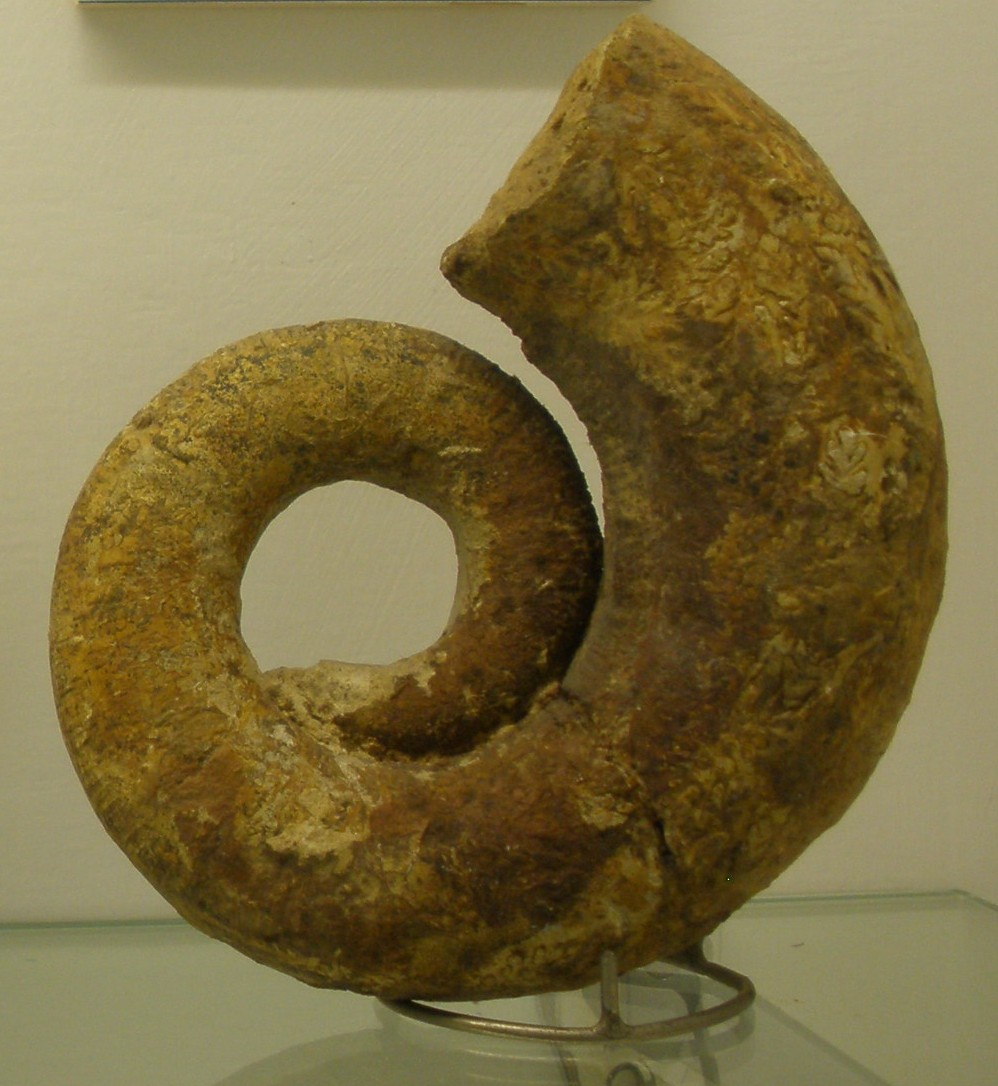
- Lytoceras fimbriatum

Scientific classification
- Domain: Eukaryota
- Kingdom: Animalia
- Phylum: Mollusca
- Class: Cephalopoda
- Subclass: †Ammonoidea
- Order: †Ammonitida
- Family: †Lytoceratidae
- Subfamily: †Lytoceratinae
- Genus: †Lytoceras; Suess, 1865

Species
- Lytoceras aulaeum Anderson, 1938; Lytoceras baconicum Vadasz, 1910; Lytoceras batesi Whiteaves, 1884; Lytoceras belliseptatiforme Collignon, 1962; Lytoceras cornucopia Young and Bird, 1822; Lytoceras crenatum Buckman, 1926; Lytoceras eudesianum (Orbigny, 1845); Lytoceras fimbriatoides Gemmellaro, 1884; Lytoceras fimbriatum Sowerby, 1817; Lytoceras fraasi Dacqué, 1910; Lytoceras francisci Oppel, 1865; Lytoceras fuggeri Geyer, 1893; Lytoceras furcicrenatum Buckman, 1928; Lytoceras juillieti (Orbigny, 1841); Lytoceras ovimontanum Geyer, 1893; Lytoceras polycyclum Neumayr, 1873; Lytoceras polyanchomenum (Gemellaro, 1872); Lytoceras praesublineatum Fucini, 1899; Lytoceras richei Sayn, 1901; Lytoceras saturnale Anderson, 1938; Lytoceras sepositum Meneghini, 1875; Lytoceras subfimbriatoides Hoedemaeker in Hoedemaeker et al., 2016; Lytoceras subfimbriatum (Orbigny, 1841); Lytoceras sutile Oppel, 1868; Lytoceras trompianum Hauer, 1861; Lytoceras villae Meneghini, 1874

= Lytoceras =

Lytoceras Temporal range: Sinemurian–Cenomanian

Genus of molluscs (fossil)

Lytoceras is an ammonite genus that was extant during most of the Jurassic and Cretaceous periods, and is the type genus for the family Lytoceratidae. These cephalopods were fast-moving nektonic carnivores.

== Description ==
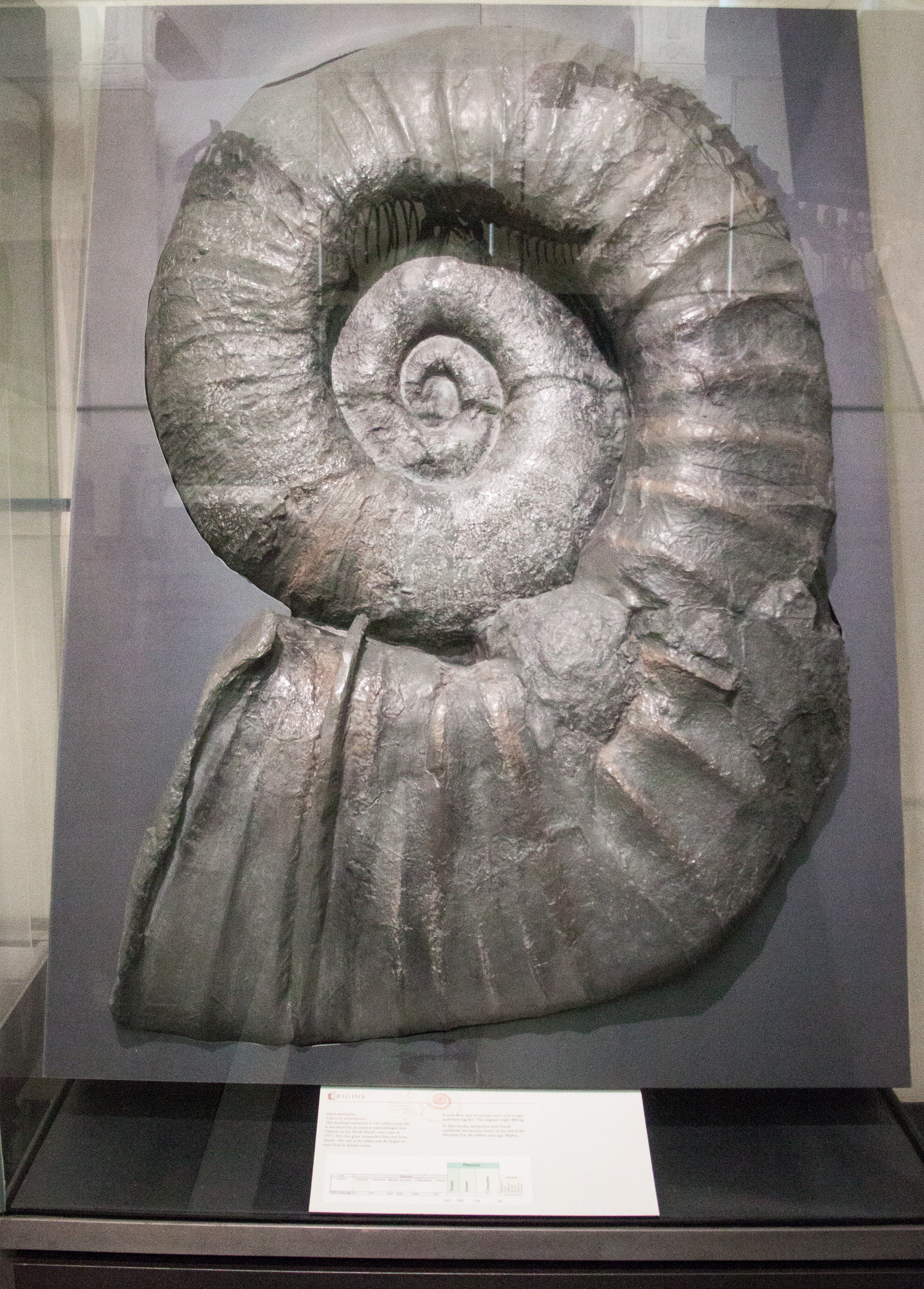
The giant L. taharoaense, Auckland War Memorial Museum

Shells of Lytoceras are evolute, round or quadrate in section, covered with crinkled growth lines or riblets, and may have slight constrictions on internal molds. Some have fine striations, (parallel grooves running longitudinally along the flanks).

== Distribution ==
Fossils of species within this genus have been found in the Jurassic and Cretaceous rocks all over the world, particularly in Western Europe, Morocco, Madagascar, South Africa and United States.
