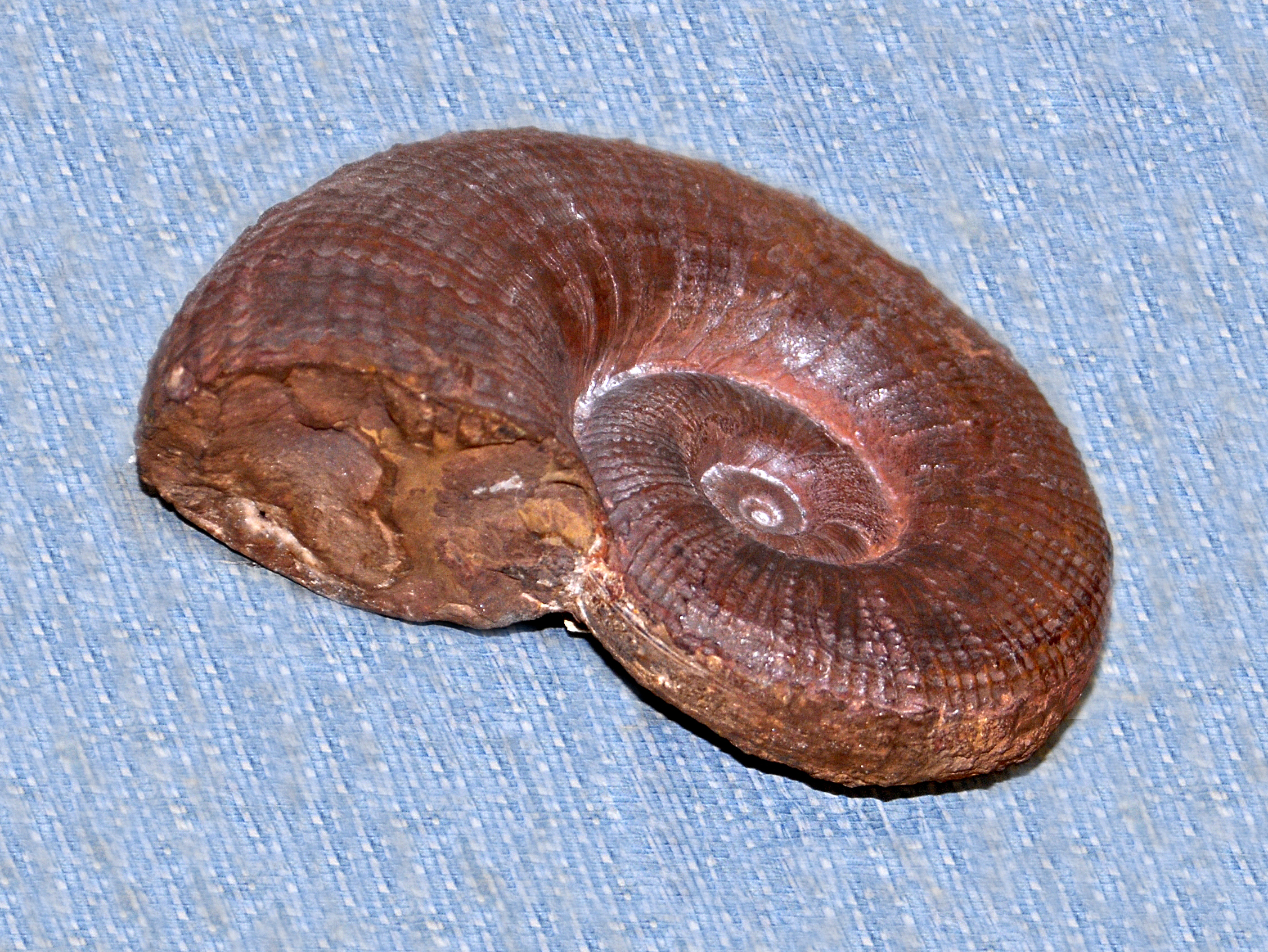
- Fossil shells of Lytoceras cornucopia from Isère (France), on display at Galerie de paléontologie et d'anatomie comparée in Paris

Scientific classification
- Domain: Eukaryota
- Kingdom: Animalia
- Phylum: Mollusca
- Class: Cephalopoda
- Subclass: †Ammonoidea
- Order: †Ammonitida
- Suborder: †Lytoceratina; Hyatt, 1899

Families
- Lytoceratidae; Arcuceratidae; Bochianitidae; Dactyloceratidae; Derolytoceritidae; Ectocentritidae; Gaudryceratidae; Nannolytoceratidae; Pleuroacanthitidae; Protetragonitidae; Tetragonitidae

= Lytoceratina =

Lytoceratina Temporal range: Lower Jurassic–Upper Cretaceous

Extinct suborder of ammonites

Lytoceratina is a suborder of Jurassic and Cretaceous ammonites that produced loosely coiled, evolute and gyroconic shells in which the sutural element are said to have complex moss-like endings.

== Morphologic characteristics ==
Shells are generally evolute, with all whorls exposed and touching, some are gyroconic with whorls separated by a space. Whorl sections vary from subcircular to narrowly compressed. The venter, or outer rim, is generally broadly arched but in some is keeled. Sides are either smooth or ribbed. Sutural elements are typically complex, referred to in the literature as moss-like, with adventious and secondary subdivisions. Saddle endings tend to be rounded but usually not phylloid, lobes tend to be more jagged with thornlike endings. Aptychi are single valved and concentrically striated (Anaptychus)

== Derivation and phylogeny ==
The Lytoceratina, which constitute a suborder within the Ammonitida, are derived from the Triassic Ussuritidae or Discophyllitidae, families belonging to the Phylloceratina, or both (which would make them polyphyletic). They in turn gave rise to the main body of Jurassic Ammonitina and to the Cretaceous Ancyloceratina.

== Included Families ==
Twelve families have been described of which the Lytoceratidae dominate. The Lytoceratidae also have the longest range, from the Lower Jurassic to the Cenomanian stage in the Upper Cretaceous.
