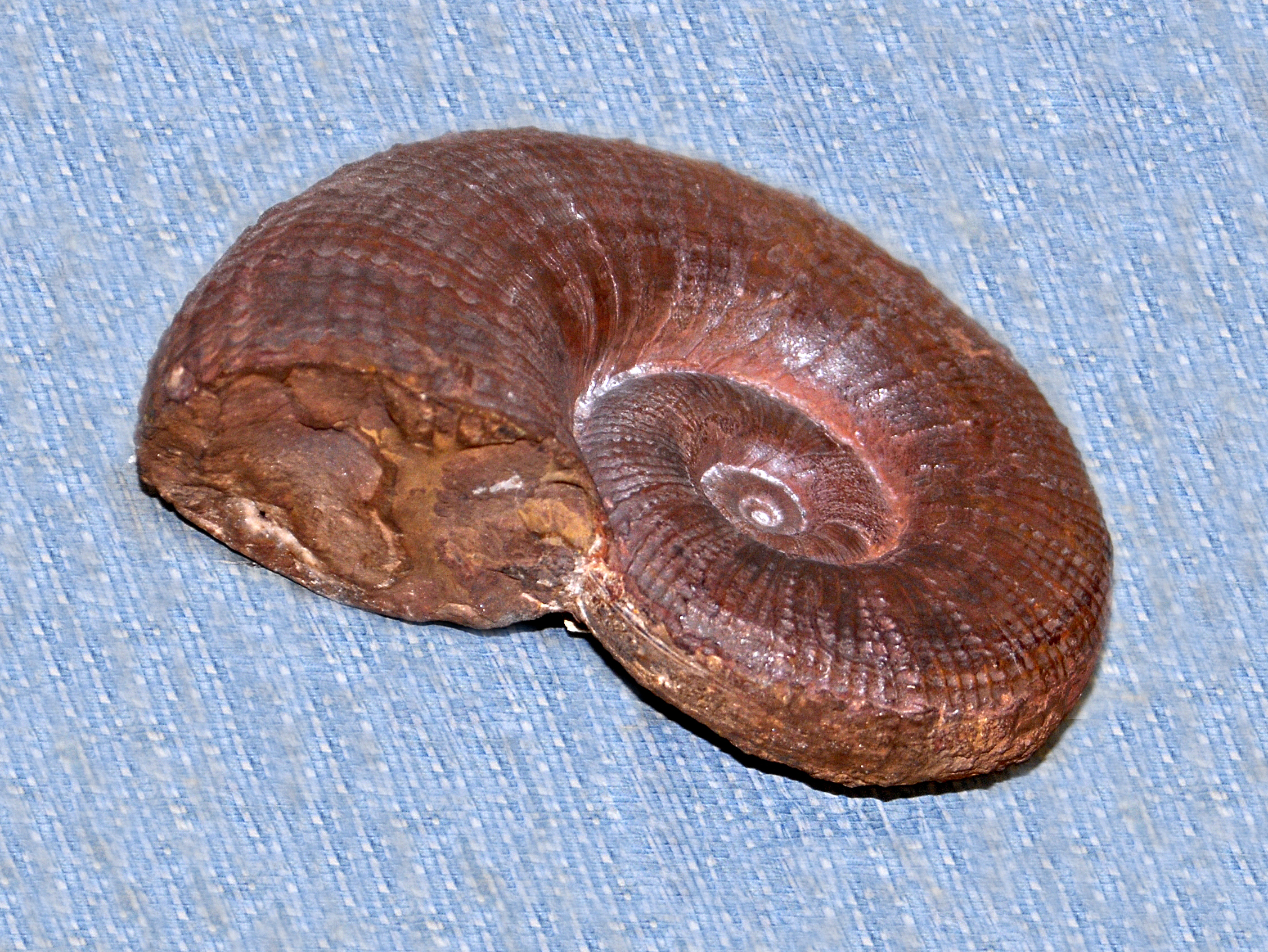
- Fossil shells of Lytoceras cornucopia from Isère (France), on display at Galerie de paléontologie et d'anatomie comparée in Paris

Scientific classification
- Kingdom: Animalia
- Phylum: Mollusca
- Class: Cephalopoda
- Subclass: †Ammonoidea
- Order: †Ammonitida
- Suborder: †Lytoceratina
- Family: †Lytoceratidae; Newmayr, 1875

Subfamilies
- See text

= Lytoceratidae =

Lytoceratidae Temporal range: Pliensbachian–Cenomanian

Extinct family of molluscs

Lytoceratidae is a taxonomic family of ammonoid cephalopods belonging to the suborder Lytoceratina, characterized by very evolute shells that generally enlarge rapidly, having whorls in contact but mostly overlapping very sightly, or not at all.

Surface ornament may consist of various combinations of straight or crinkled growth lines, flares, constrictions, and, more rarely, plications. Sutures are highly complex and moss-like, but with few major elements. Lateral lobes are widely splayed and blunt, or with obliquely deflected end. The external, ventral, lobe is short.

The Lytoceratinae have a worldwide distribution and a stratigraphic range extending from the middle Lower Jurassic (Pliensbachian) to the early Upper Cretaceous (Cenomanian).

== Subfamilies ==
The Lytoceratidae has been divided into four subfamilies, as follows.

- Lytoceratinae Neumayr 1875 (Pliensbachian)
  - Ammonoceratites Bowditch 1822
  - Argonauticeras Anderson 1938
  - Carinolytoceras Wiedmann 1962
  - Eulytoceras Spath 1927
  - Hemilytoceras Spath 1927
  - Lytoceras Suess 1865
  - Metalytoceras Spath 1927
  - Pictetia Uhlig 1883
  - Protetragonites Hyatt 1900
  - Pterolytoceras Spath 1927

Lytoceratids with whorls that bear growth lines or lamellar flares, or both, and in which there are only two lateral lobes in the external suture, on either side, and the dorsal lobe is cruciform (cross like).

- Megalytoceratinae (Toarcian – Bajocian)

Planulate lytoceratids in which whorls and sutures tend to lose lytoceratid character and resemble those of the perisphinctidae.

- Villaniinae (Callovian)

Plantulate lytoceratids with sutures like those in the Lytoceratinae, but without the dorsal lobe being cruciform.

- Alocolytoceratinae Spath 1927 (Toarcian – Bajocian)
  - Alocolytoceras
  - Audaxlytoceras
  - Derolytoceras
  - Lobolytoceras
  - Pachylytoceras
  - Pleurolytoceras

Lytoceratids with many deep constrictions resulting and capricorns in middle whorls. Outer whorls become more smooth and involute. Capricorn: a shell encircled by blunt, wide spaced ribs separated by subequal rounded interspaces, resembling a goat's horn .
