= Beudantiella =

Beudantiella Temporal range: Albian

Scientific classification
- Kingdom: Animalia
- Phylum: Mollusca
- Class: Cephalopoda
- Subclass: †Ammonoidea
- Order: †Ammonitida
- Family: †Desmoceratidae
- Genus: †Beudantiella; Brestroffer 1947

Species
- None cataloged

Lower Cretaceous ammonite found in Queensland, Australia

Beudantiella is a high whorled, compressed, sparsely ribbed ammonite from the Lower Cretaceous, (Upper Albian), found in Queensland, Australia.

Beudantiella is a member of the Beudanticeratinae, a desmoceratid subfamily, and of the Desmocerataceae. Related genera include Beudanticeras, Uhligella, and Zurcherella.
