= Melchiorites =

Melchiorites Temporal range: Aptian

Scientific classification
- Kingdom: Animalia
- Phylum: Mollusca
- Class: Cephalopoda
- Subclass: †Ammonoidea
- Order: †Ammonitida
- Family: †Desmoceratidae
- Genus: †Melchiorites; Spath, 1923

Species
- M. melchioris

Genus of desmoceratid ammonite

Melchiorites is a desmoceratid ammonite genus included in the subfamily Puzosiinae. Member species are characterized by an essentially evolute shell in which the early whorls are smooth, with sinuous radial or oblique constrictions but in which later whorls have feeble intermediate ribs on the outer part of the sides and venter.

Melchioites is known from Lower Cretaceous of Europe, north Africa, and California. The type species, Melchiorites melchioris is from the Upper Albian of France.
