= Zurcherella =

Zurcherella Temporal range: Barremian-Aptian ~122–112 Ma

Scientific classification
- Kingdom: Animalia
- Phylum: Mollusca
- Class: Cephalopoda
- Subclass: †Ammonoidea
- Order: †Ammonitida
- Family: †Desmoceratidae
- Genus: †Zurcherella; Casey, 1934

Species
- Z. zurcheri

Extinct genus of molluscs

Zurcherella is a Lower Cretaceous (Upper Barremian - Upper Aptian desmoceratid ammonite from France and Colombia (Apón and Yuruma Formations, La Guajira). Its shell is moderately compressed and rather involute (outer whorls covering most of the inner), with fine sinuous ribs that arise some distance above the umbilical rim. Zurcherella differs from its descendant Uhligella in that in the latter, ribs arise from the umbilical shoulder.

Zurcherella is the earliest of the desmoceratid subfamily Beudanticeratinae, which includes among others, Uhligella, Beudanticeras, and Beudantiella.
