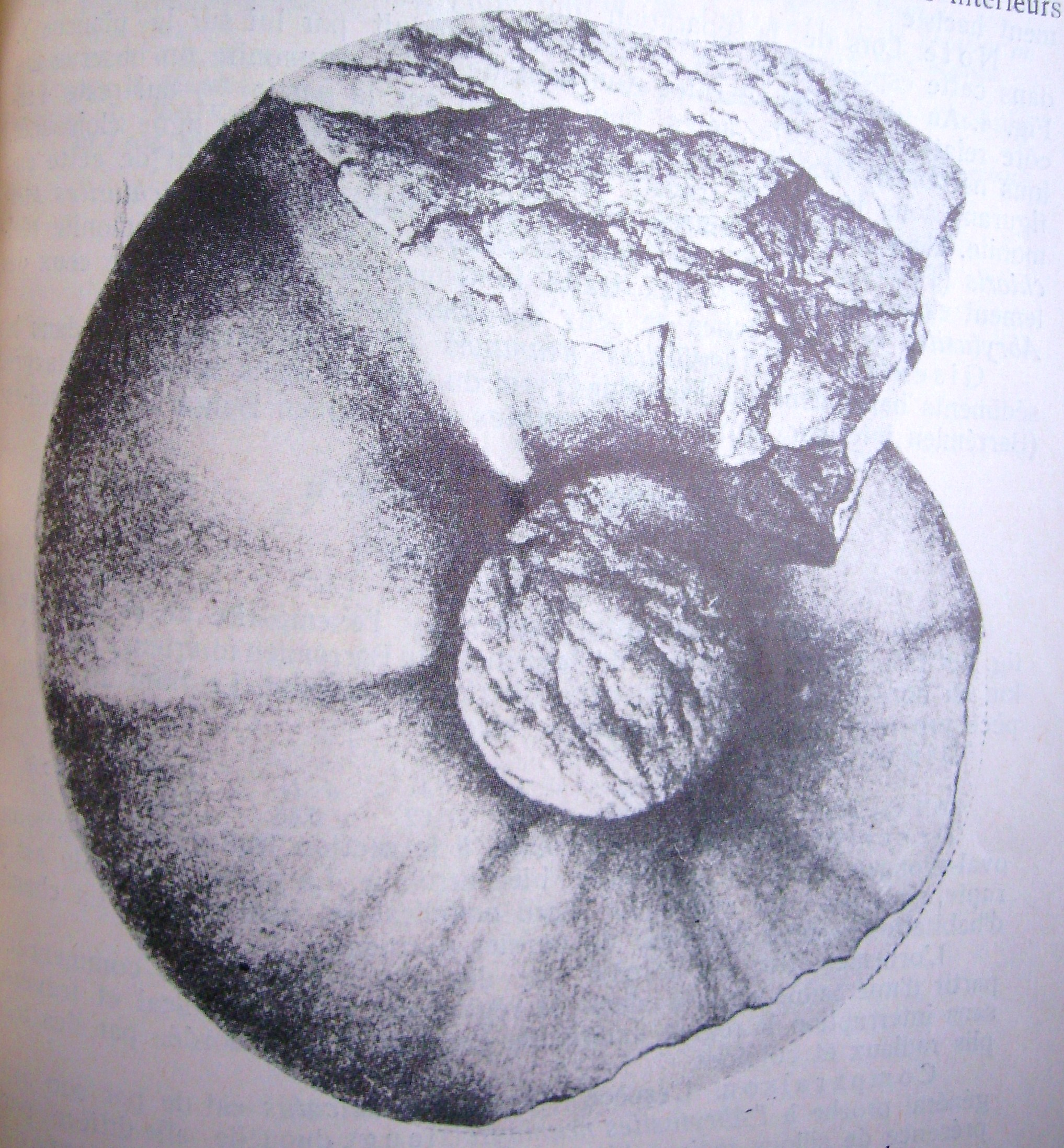
- Abrytasites neumayri Haug, 1889

Scientific classification
- Kingdom: Animalia
- Phylum: Mollusca
- Class: Cephalopoda
- Subclass: †Ammonoidea
- Order: †Ammonitida
- Family: †Desmoceratidae
- Subfamily: †Puzosiinae
- Genus: †Abrytasites; Nikolov & Breskovski, 1969

= Abrytasites =

Abrytasites Temporal range: Hauterivian- Barremian

Genus of molluscs (fossil)

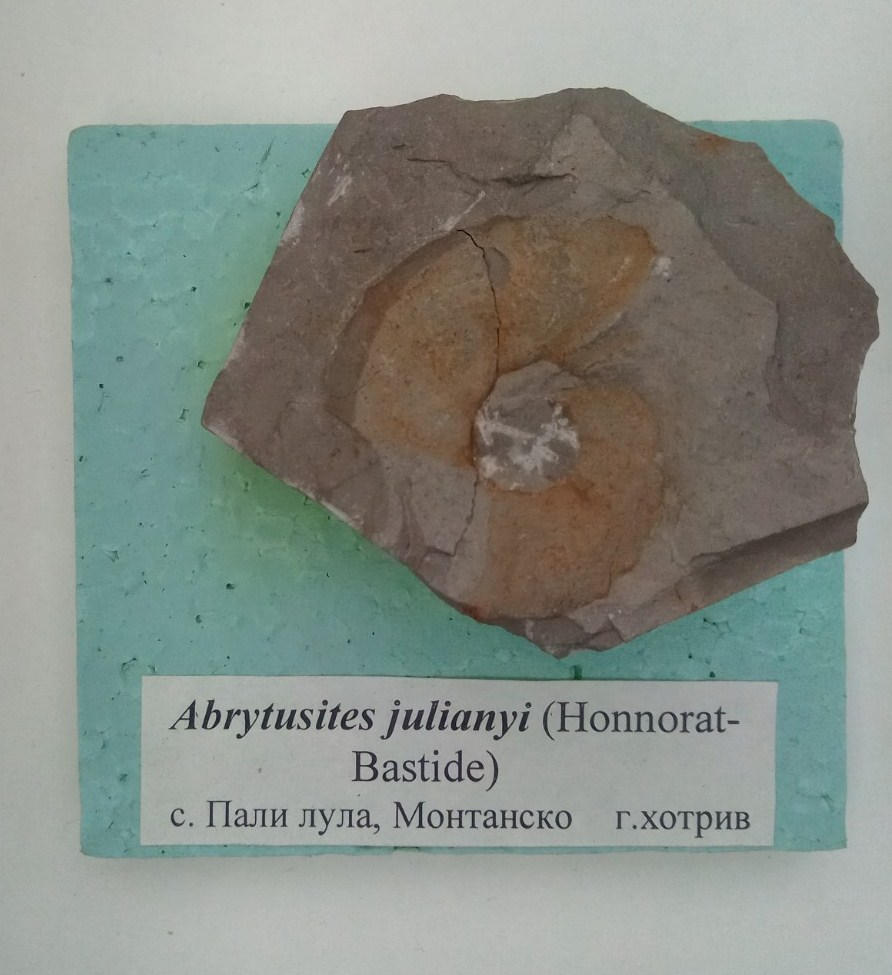
Abrytusites julianyi (Honnorat-Bastide), Upper Hauterivian, Palilula, Bulgaria, (Coll. G. Mandov) at the Sofia University Museum of Paleontology and Historical Geology

Abrytasites (Abrytusites) is an extinct genus of cephalopods belonging to the Ammonoidea subclass.

== Description ==
The genus was named after the ancient Roman town of Abrittus, located near the present Bulgarian city of Razgrad. There are several described species of Abrytasites, including A. thieuloyi, A. julianyi, and A. neumayri. They are inflated, with constrictions, have rather thick ribs springing irregularly, singly or in pairs, from umbilical bullae. Their inner whorls closely resemble types species of Valdedorsella. This animal lived 125–136.4 million years ago during the Hauterivian and the Barremian in Europe and western Africa.

== See also ==
- List of ammonite genera
