= Cohors II Lucensium =

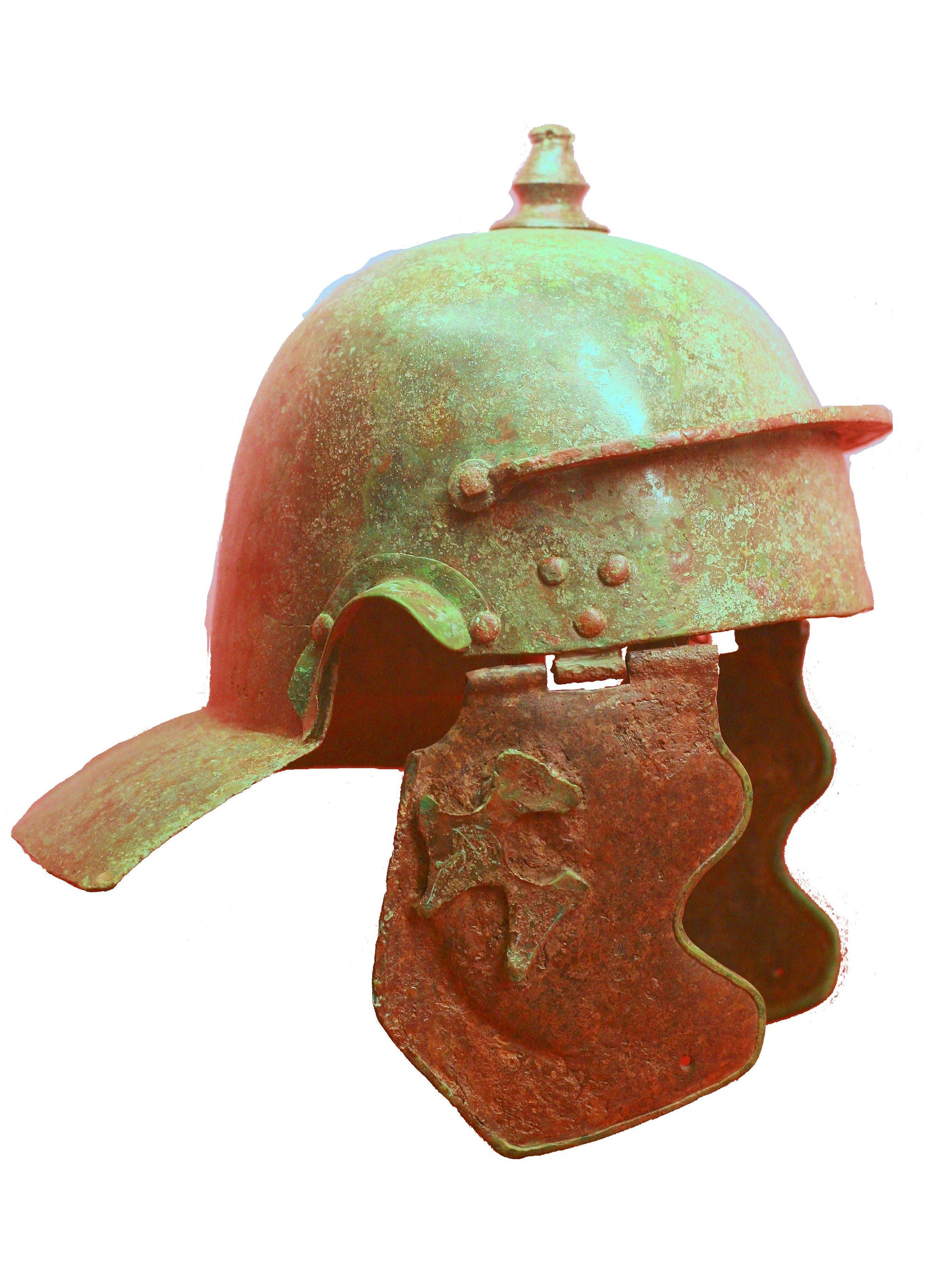
- Roman infantry helmet (late 1st century)
- Active: early 1st century to at least early 3rd century
- Country: Roman Empire
- Type: Roman auxiliary cohort
- Role: infantry/cavalry
- Size: 600 men (480 infantry, 120 cavalry)
- Garrison/HQ: Moesia, Pannonia, Moesia Inferior, and Thracia

The Cohors II Lucensium [equitata] (2nd cohort from the Conventus Lucensis [partly mounted]) was a Roman auxiliary unit. It is attested by military diplomas and inscriptions.

== Name ==
- Lucensium: from the conventus Lucensis. The soldiers of the cohort were recruited, at least initially, from in the territory of conventus Lucensis with the capital Lucus Augusti (modern Lugo), Spain.
- equitata: partly mounted. The cohort was a mixed unit of infantry and cavalry.

Since there is no evidence for the suffix milliaria (1000 men), the unit was a cohors quingenaria equitata. The target strength of the cohort was 600 men, 480 infantry and 120 cavalry, consisting of 6 centurias of infantry with 80 men each and 4 turmae of cavalry with 30 men each.

== History ==
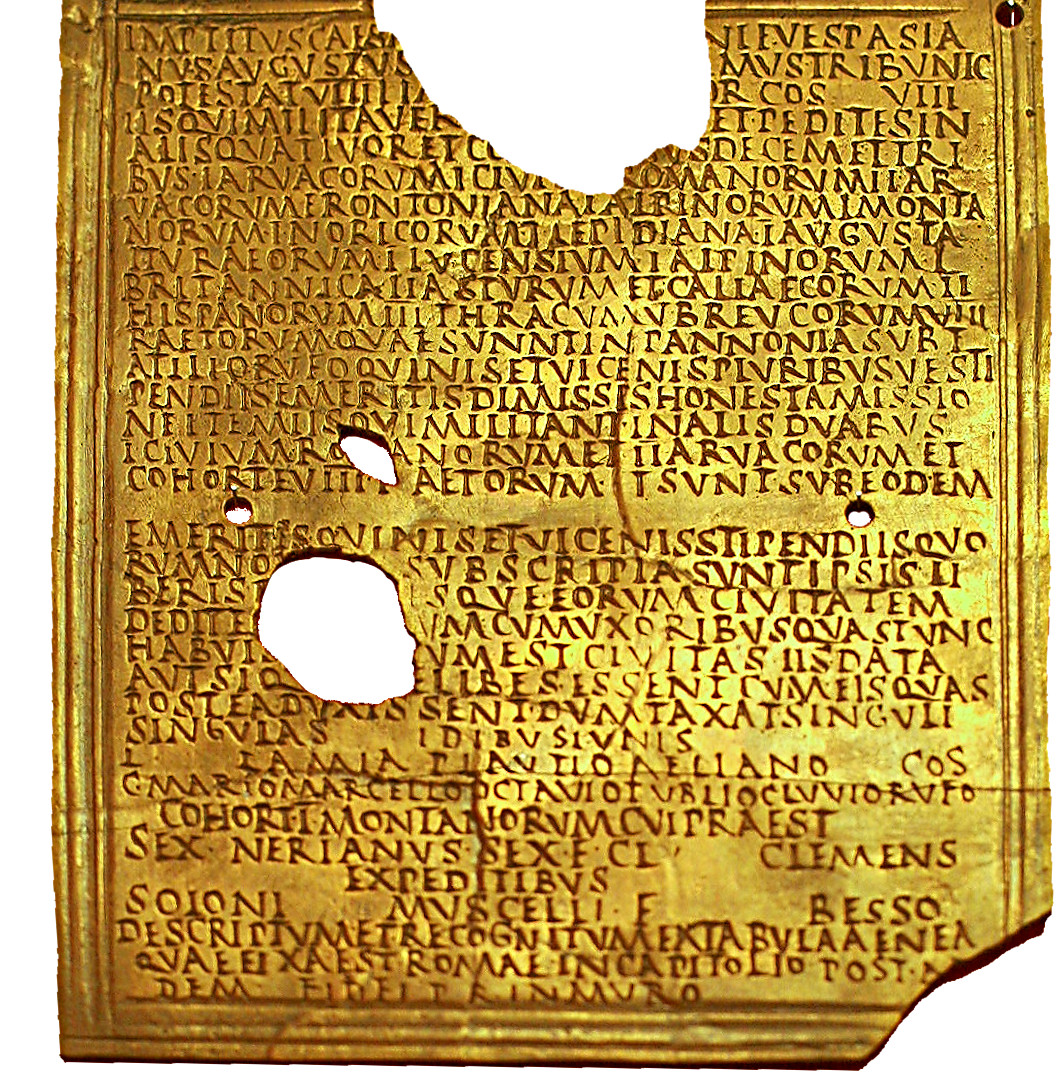
Military diploma from 13 June 80 AD

The cohort was stationed in the provinces of Moesia, Pannonia, Moesia Inferior, and Thracia, in that order. It is listed on military diplomas for the years 78 to 180/192 AD.

The first evidence of the unit in the province of Moesia is based on a military diploma dated to the year 78. The diploma lists the cohort as part of the troops stationed in the province.

The cohort's deployment in 80 in the province of Pannonia is controversial. The military diploma, issued for the province of Pannonia dated 13 June 80 AD, lists Cohors I Lucensium in one place and Cohors II Lucensium elsewhere. John Spaul, Jörg Scheuerbrandt and Margaret M. Roxan assign the diploma to Cohors I Lucensium, while Agustín Jiménez de Furundarena to Cohors II Lucensium, leading to uncertainty over the presence of the cohort in Pannonia.

Further diplomas, dated 92 to 136, place the unit in Moesia Inferior.

Around 130 a vexillatio of the unit was stationed in Chersonesus in Crimea.

The first evidence of unit in the province of Thracia is based on a military diploma dated to 138. The diploma lists the cohort as part of the troops stationed in the province. Other diplomas dated from 155 to 180/192 attest to unit in the same province.

== Stations ==
Locations of the cohort in Moesia and Thracia were possibly:

- Abritus (Razgrad)
- Germania in Dacia (Sapareva Banya)
- Kabyle
- Montana, Bulgaria

== Members of the cohort ==
The following members of the cohort are known.

=== Commanders ===
- []s Philippus: he is named in a diploma of 180/192 as commander of the cohort.
- Claudius Lupus, a prefect (c. 135)
- Flavius Maximianus: he is named in a diploma of 160 as commander of the cohort.
- Lucius Pollius Gratus, a prefect (c. 195)
- Publius Gavius Balbus
- T(itus) Herennius Niger, a prefect (c. 217/218)
- Ulpius Marius, a prefect
- Apronius Maximus, a tribune (some time between 92 - 136 AD) when the cohort was stationed in Abritus, Moesia Inferior, his name is found on a graze land border stone between the modern day villages of Osenets and Getsovo in Bulgaria, noting that the land there is a pasture for the cohort's cavalry.

=== Others ===
- Aelius Tarsas, a centurion
- Auluzenis, a soldier
- Aurelius Saturninus, a soldier
- Gaius Iulius Maximus, a cavalryman, whose tombstone was found in Abritus, Moesia Inferior and dated to circa 136 AD
- Flavius Mestrius Ius[tus], a soldier
- M(arcus) Antonius Valens, a soldier
- Rescuporus, a foot soldier

== See also ==
- List of Roman auxiliary regiments
