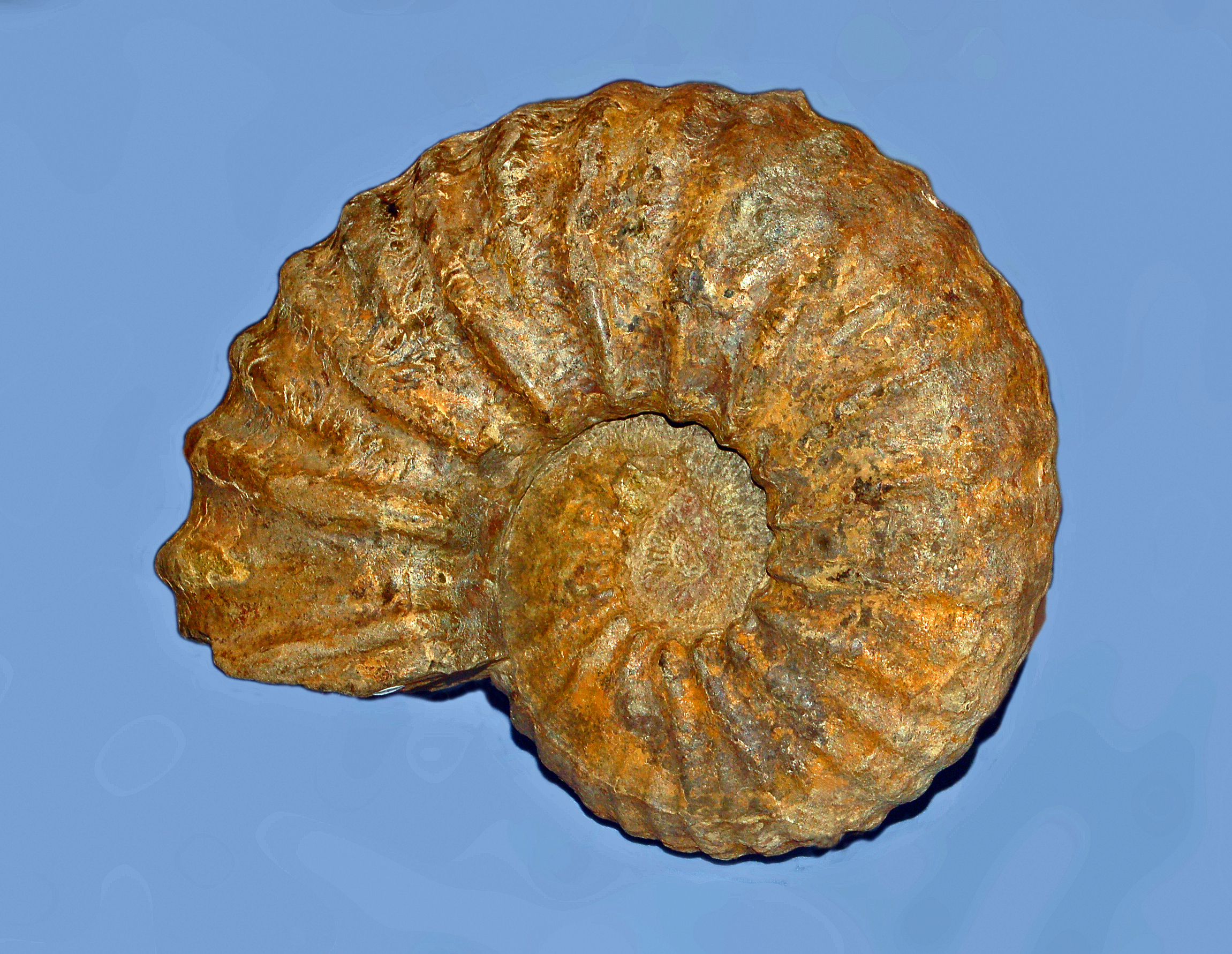
- Pachydesmoceras sp., upper Cretaceous (Turonian), from Madagascar

Scientific classification
- Kingdom: Animalia
- Phylum: Mollusca
- Class: Cephalopoda
- Subclass: †Ammonoidea
- Order: †Ammonitida
- Family: †Desmoceratidae
- Subfamily: †Puzosiinae
- Genus: †Pachydesmoceras; Spath, 1922

= Pachydesmoceras =

Pachydesmoceras Temporal range: Cretaceous

Genus of molluscs (fossil)

Pachydesmoceras is a genus of ammonites belonging to the family Desmoceratidae.

Species of this genus were fast-moving nektonic carnivorous shelled cephalopods. They lived during the Cretaceous, from the Albian (112.0-99.6 Mya) to the Santonian (85.8-83.5 Mya) stage.

== Distribution ==
Cretaceous of Antarctica, Cameroon, India, Japan, Nigeria, Romania, United States (California).

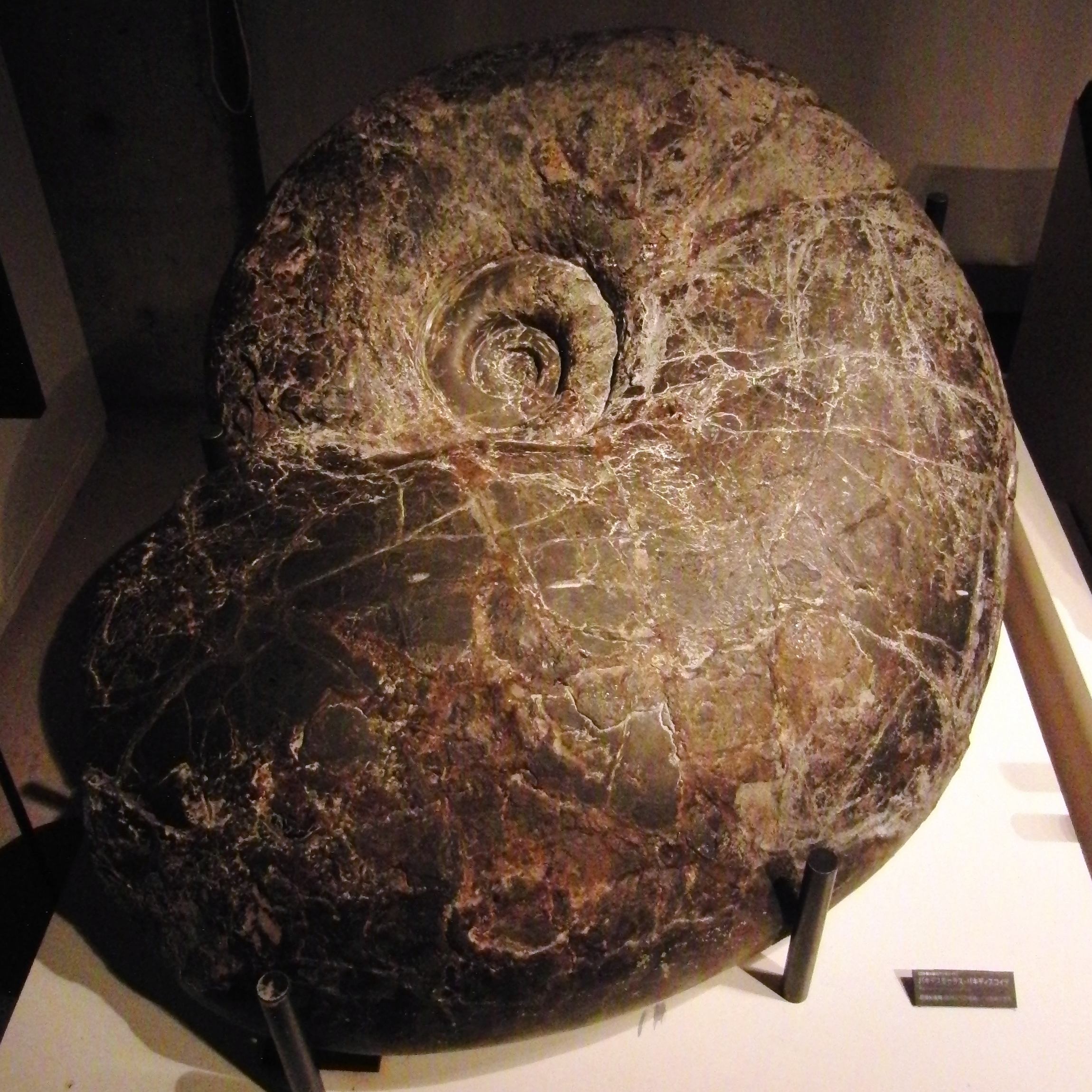
Fossil of Pachydesmoceras pachydiscoide from Japan. Exhibit in the National Museum of Nature and Science, Tokyo, Japan.

== See also ==
- Cephalopod size
