= Abritus =

Roman ruins in Bulgaria

- Location within Bulgaria
- 43°31′16″N 26°33′06″E

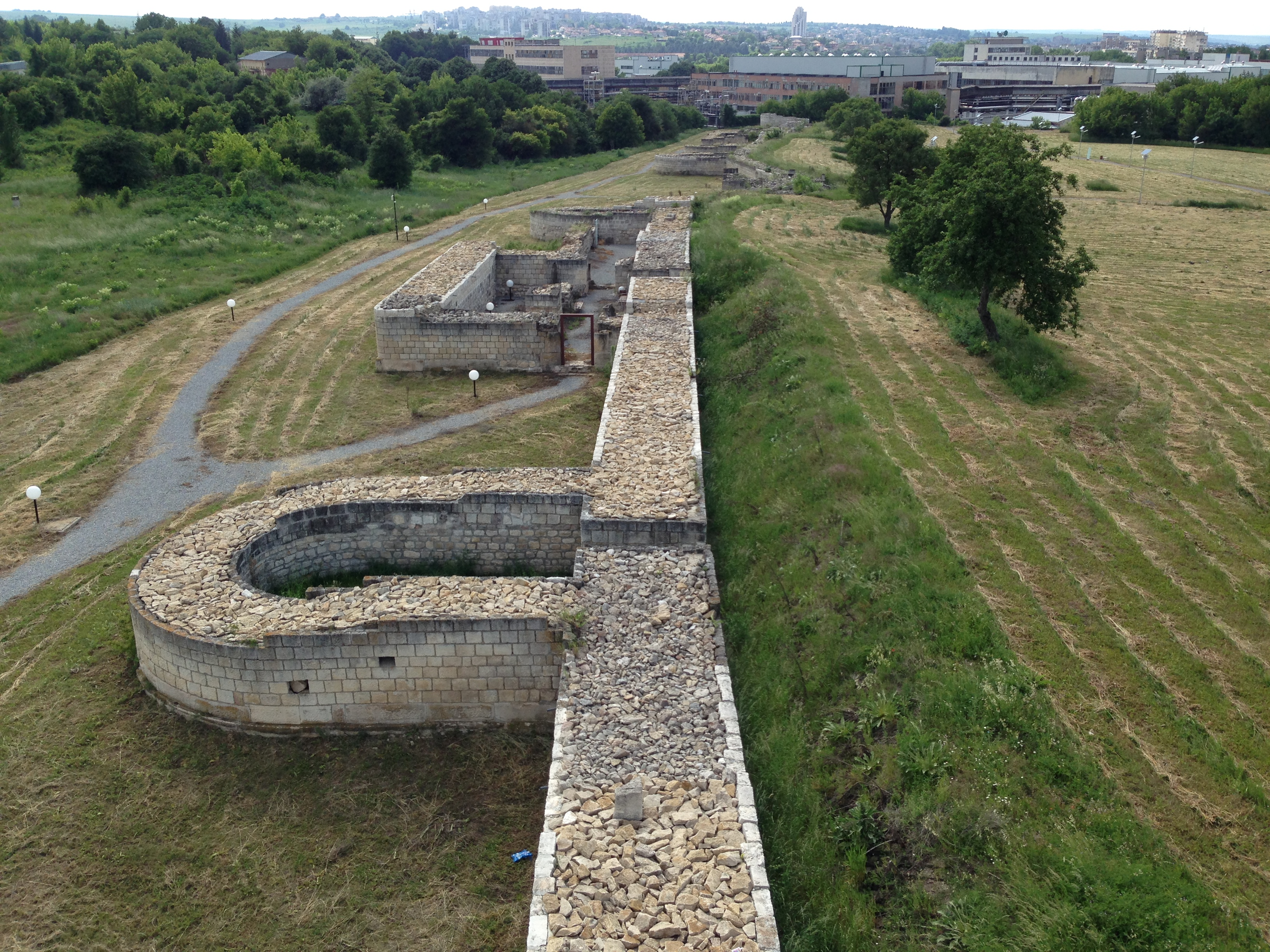
Southern wall

Abritus or Abrittus (Bulgarian: Абритус) was an impressive Roman walled city and one of the biggest urban centres in the province of Moesia Inferior. Its remains are in the Archaeological Park of Razgrad.

== History ==
A Thracian settlement of the 3rd–4th century BC has been found on the north bank of the Beli Lom river, and an early Roman settlement extended it in the late 1st or early 2nd century AD.

At the end of the 1st century AD a Roman military camp was built, and in the 2nd century the Cohors II Lucensium of the Legio XI Claudia (based at Durostorum) was stationed here.

In 251 during the Gothic invasions the Romans suffered a disastrous defeat and the death of the Emperor Decius and his son Herennius Etruscus at the Battle of Abritus, which took place about 15 km (9.3 mi) northwest of Abritus, in the valley of the river Beli Lom, to the south of the village of Dryanovets.

The fortifications with massive walls, 3 m (9.8 ft) thick and 12 m (39 ft) high, were built around the town on the south bank of the river in 320–330 under Constantine the Great, seemingly for protection from immigrant "barbarians" (foederati) as part of the policy of pacifying them.

However, the walls could not withstand the destruction of the city in the Gothic Wars in 376–8, in 447 by the Huns, and in the 480s again by the Goths. Each time the city was rebuilt, and in the 5th–6th centuries Abritus was one of the largest cities in the province and seat of a bishop.

The gates were narrowed under Justinian (527–565) to provide better security. However the city was destroyed by the Avars in 586.

Later a Bulgarian mediaeval settlement was built, which existed until the 10th century.

The first archaeological survey was done in 1887 by Ananie Yavashov, and regular excavations were conducted from 1953.

== The Site ==
The walls enclosed 15 hectares (37 acres) and had 35 bastions projecting in front of the wall. The southern wall was more vulnerable than the others as it was overlooked by a slope outside, and hence the southern gate was recessed from the wall, which was also thicker in this area, and a moat was dug outside it for extra protection. Two of the bastions have superstructures built to the original height to accentuate their impressive size.

Army barracks were located to the side of the north gate in which arms were discovered.

Two aqueducts are known; one from the 2nd century originating at a spring near Peroishte 6 km (3.7 mi) southwest of the city, passing through ceramic pipes, and arriving under the south gate, and the other coming from Nedoklan 3 km (1.9 mi) to the northeast.

The largest late empire hoard of gold coins in Bulgaria was found just inside the eastern wall consisting of 835 gold coins weighing 4 kg (8.8 lb) and dating from the 5th century, probably hidden during the invasion of the Goths 487.

== Gallery ==
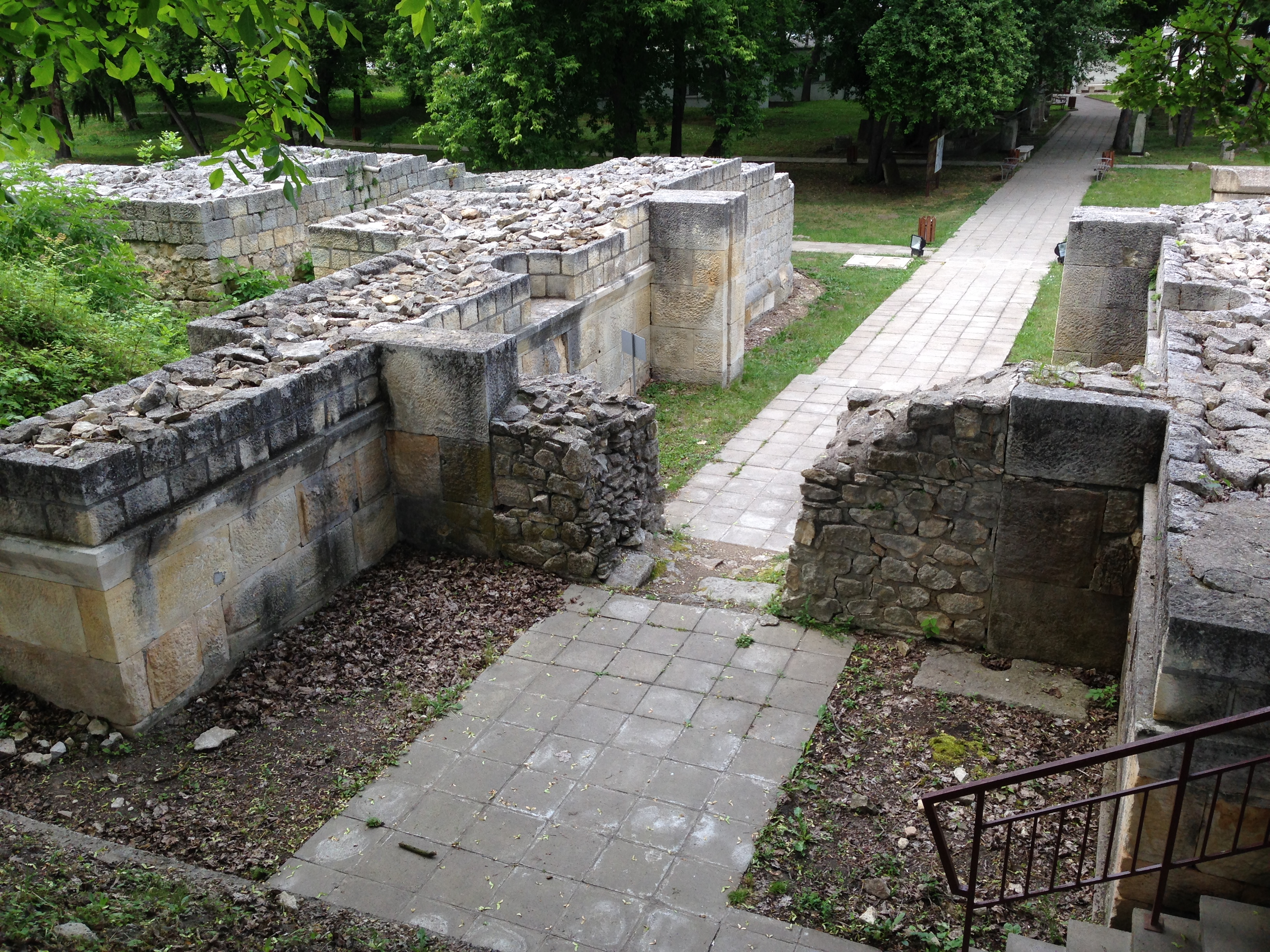
Northern gate (with later partial blocking)

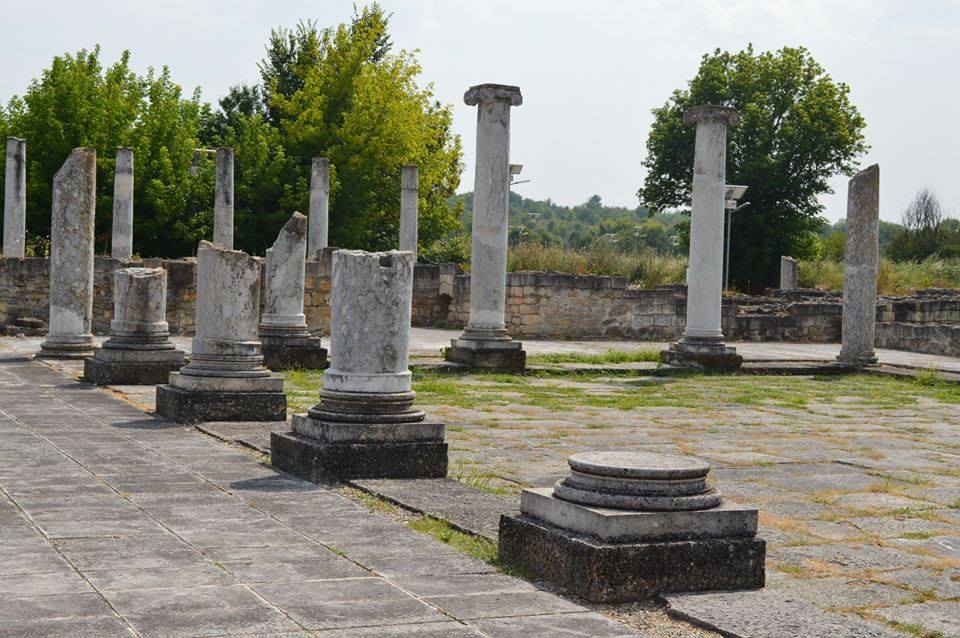
Peristiye Building

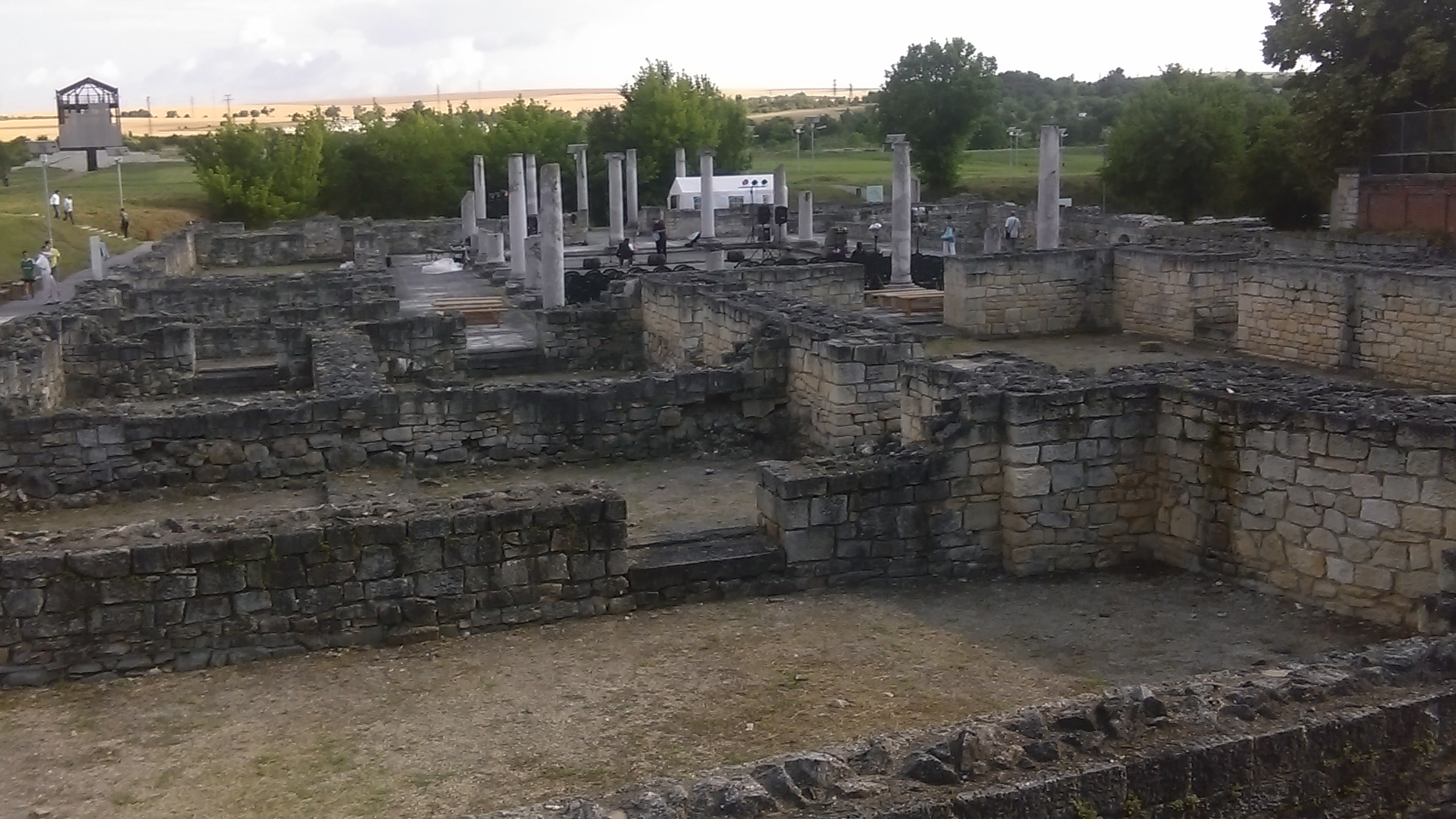
Peristiye Building

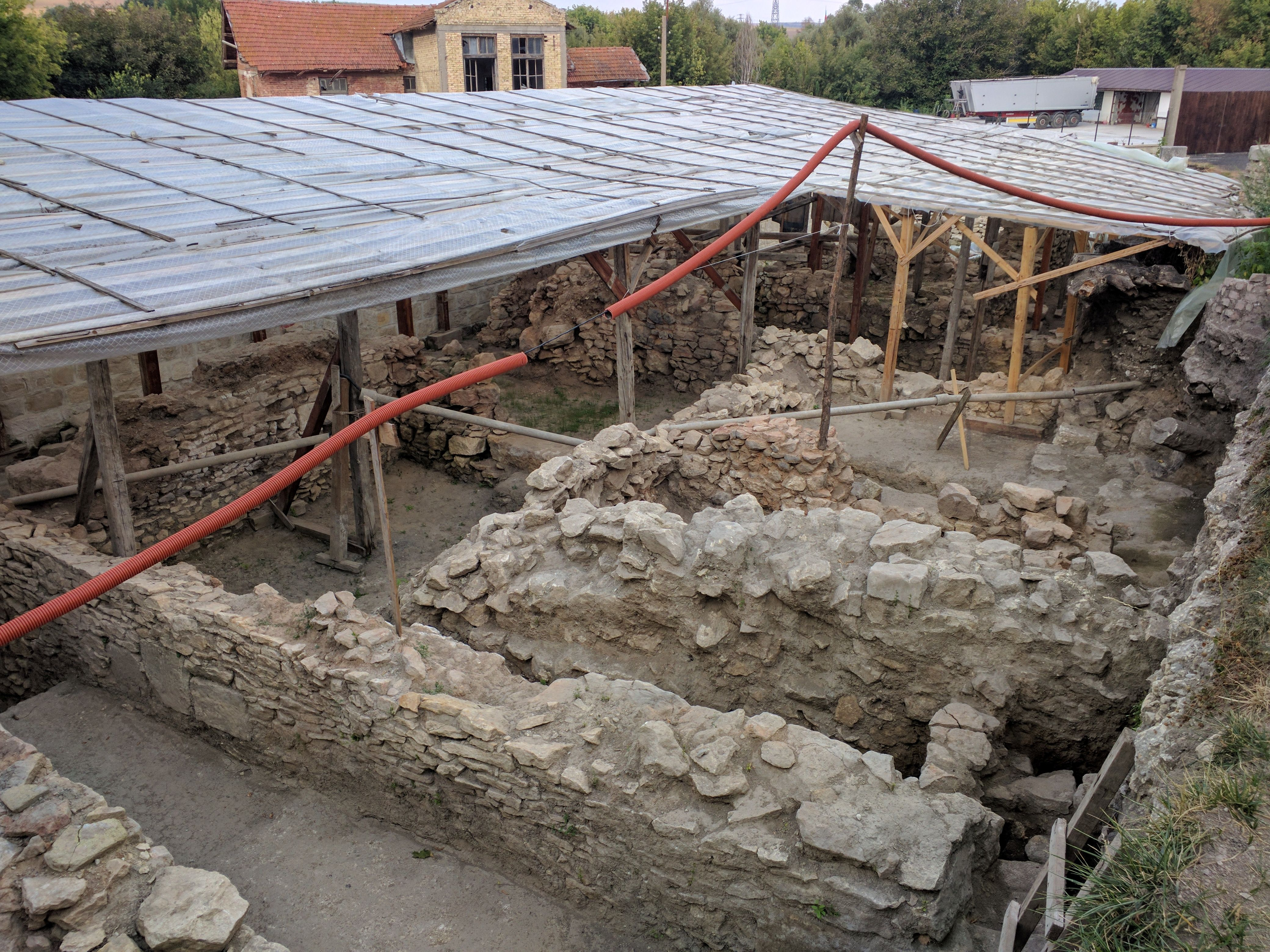
Archeological excavations

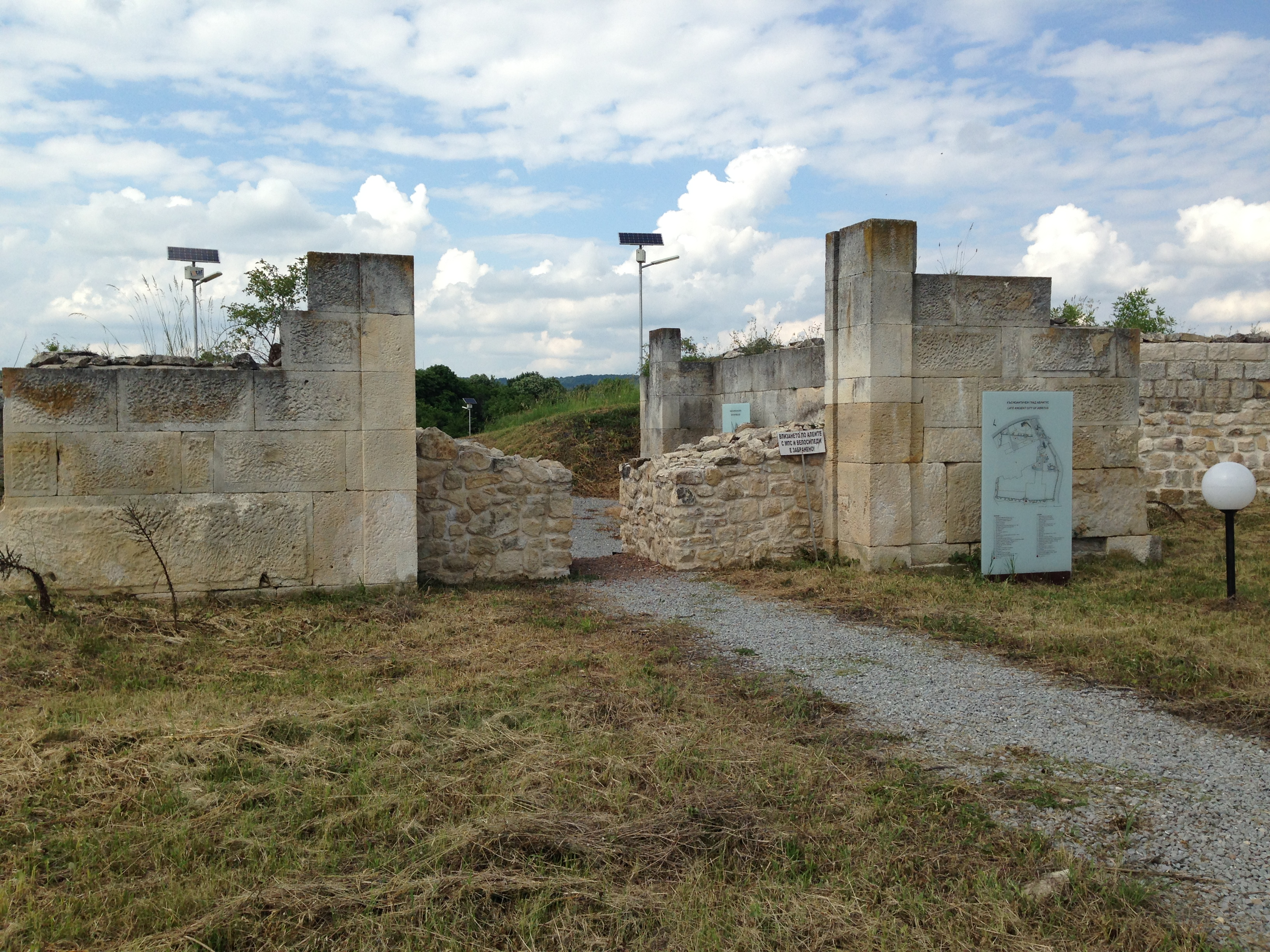
Southern gate of Abritus

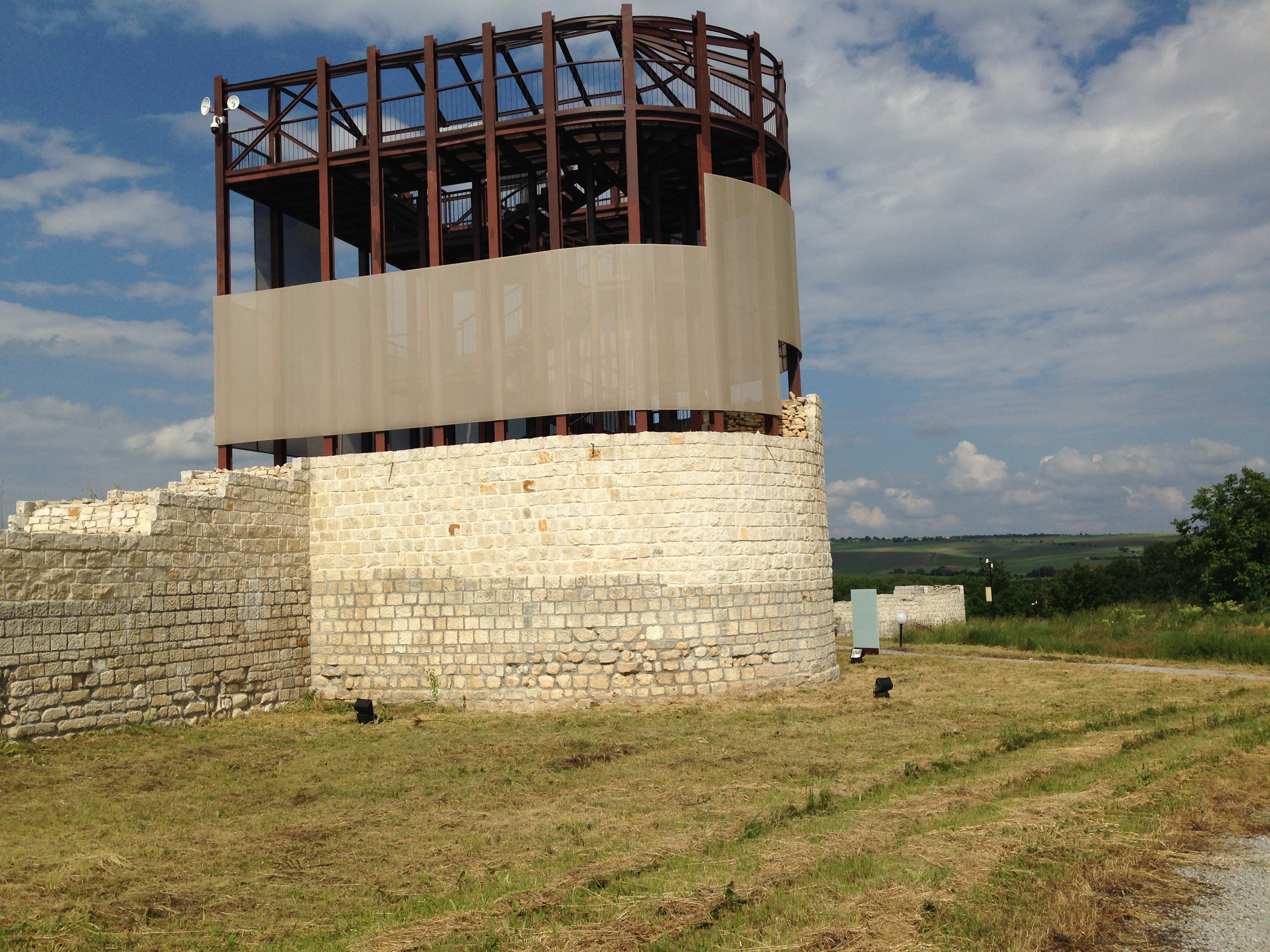
Tower

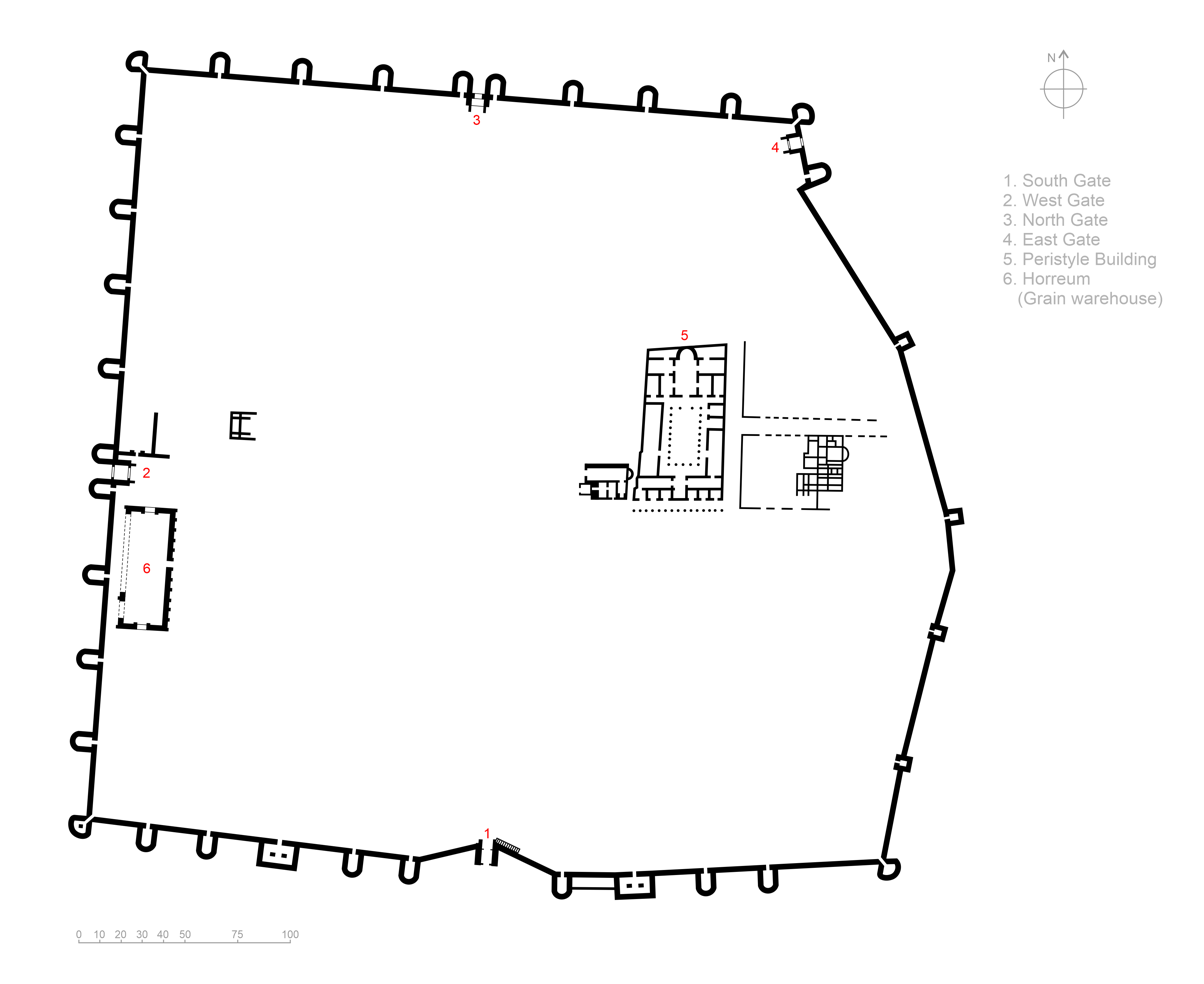
Floor plan of Abritus

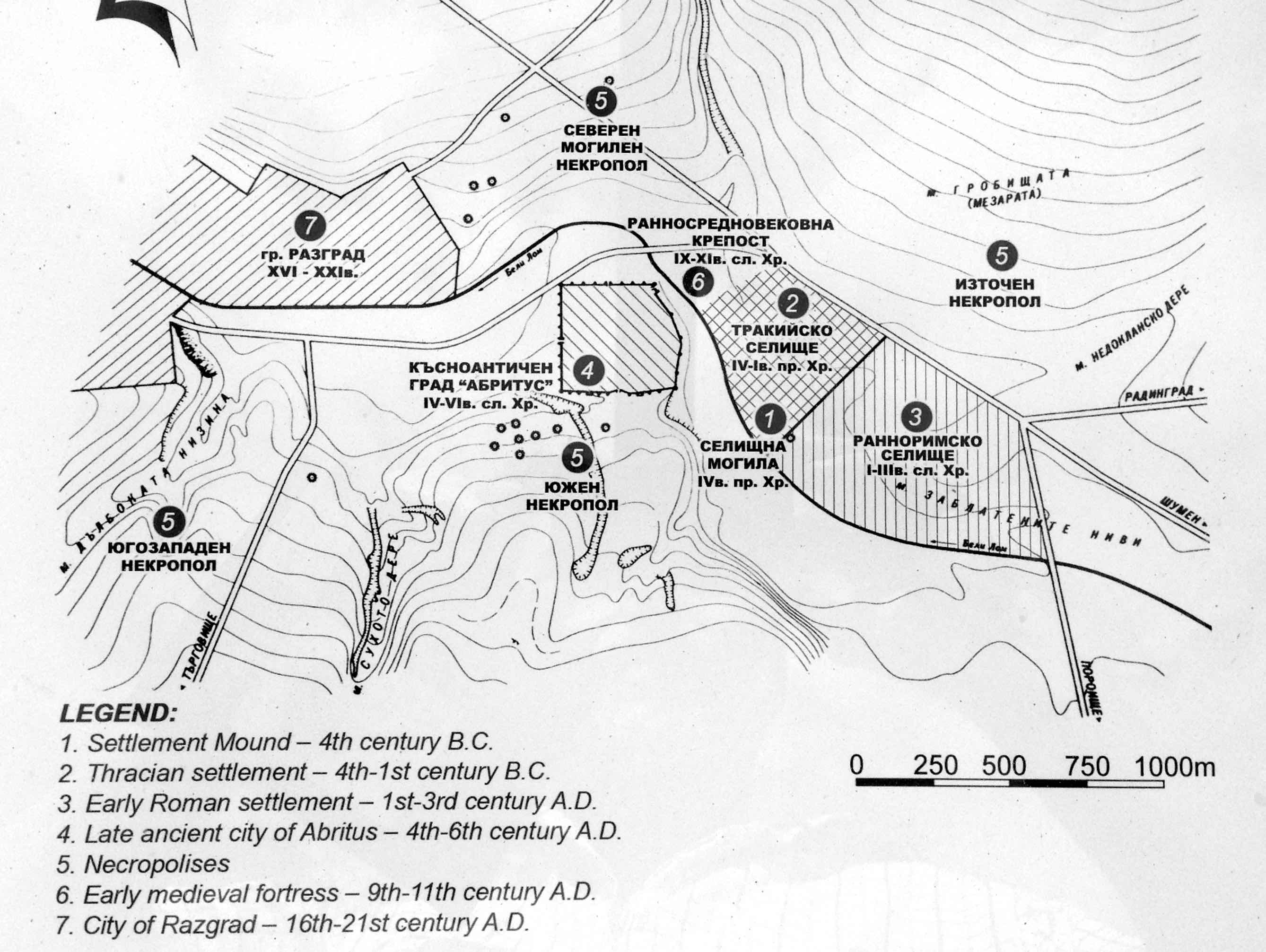
Map of ancient sites around Abritus

== See also ==
- Abrytasites, an extinct zoological genus called after the Ancient city

== Sources and external links ==
- Dinu Adameșteanu, "Abrittus (Razgrad) Bulgaria." The Princeton Encyclopedia of Classical Sites Stillwell, Richard. MacDonald, William L. McAlister, Marian Holland eds. Princeton, N.J.: Princeton University Press, 1976, Accessed on 1 April 2012.
- Jean-Philippe Carrié & Dominic Moreau, "The Archaeology of the Roman Town of Abritus : The Status Quaestionis in 2012", in L. Vagalinski & N. Sharankov (eds.), Limes XXII. Proceedings of the 22nd international Congress of Roman Frontier Studies (Ruse, Bulgaria, September 2012), NAIM, Sofia, 2015 (Bulletin of the National Archaeological Institute, 42), pp. 601–610.
- Teofil Ivanov (1963), Archäologische Forschungen in Abrittus: (1953-1961), Sofia, BAN.
- Teofil Ivanov & Stoyan Stoyanov (1985), ABRITVS - Its History and Archaeology, Razgrad: Cultural and Historical Heritage Directorate.
- Alexander P. Kazhdan (1991), Oxford Dictionary of Byzantium, Oxford: Oxford University Press, at 6.
- Brahim M'Barek & Dominic Moreau, "The Plan of Abritus (Moesia Secunda/Inferior). Status Quaestionis in 2015", in C. Sebastian Sommer & Suzana Matešić (eds.), Limes XXIII. Proceedings of the 23rd International Congress of Roman Frontier Studies Ingolstadt 2015 - Akten des 23. Internationalen Limeskongresses in Ingolstadt 2015, Mainz, 2018 (Beiträge zum welterbe Limes. Sonderband 4/II), pp. 1087–1091.
- Dominic Moreau & Jean-Philippe Carrié, "L’agglomération romaine d’Abritus (Mésie inférieure / Mésie seconde) : sources textuelles et bilan archéologique", in Chr. Freu, S. Janniard & A. Ripoll (eds.), Libera curiositas. Mélanges d'histoire romaine et d'Antiquité tardive offerts à Jean-Michel Carrié, Brepols, Turnhout, 2017 (Bibliothèque de l'Antiquité tardive, 31), pp. 229–256.
- Abritus Archaeological Reserve, Razgrad at Bulgariatravel.org (Official Tourism Portal of Bulgaria), Accessed on 21 April 2012.
