= Beudanticeras =

Beudanticeras Temporal range: Albian-Cenomanian ~112.6–89.3 Ma

Scientific classification
- Kingdom: Animalia
- Phylum: Mollusca
- Class: Cephalopoda
- Subclass: †Ammonoidea
- Order: †Ammonitida
- Family: †Desmoceratidae
- Subfamily: †Beudanticeratinae
- Genus: †Beudanticeras; Hitzell, 1902

Species
- See text

Genus of molluscs (fossil)

Beudanticeras is an extinct cephalopod genus from the Late Cretaceous period; Albian and Cenomanian, belonging to the ammonoid subclass and included in the family Desmoceratidae.

Beudanticeras has a rather to very compressed shell that is moderately involute, with convex to flat sides and a narrowly arched out rim. Coiling is such that the outer whorl embraces much of the next inner whorl, leaving a small spiraled umbilicus. The shell is generally smooth but may have weak ribs but no tubercles. The suture is ammonitic.

The derivation of Beudanticeras may be from Uhligella, although Uhligella is partly contemporary with early Beudanticeras. Other related genera include Beudantiella, Brewericeras, Zurcherella, and possibly Pseudosaynella.

== Species ==
The following species of Beudanticeras have been recognised:

- B. alamoense
- B. arduennense
- B. argonauticum
- B. beudanti
- B. flindersi
- B. hirtzi
- B. ingente
- B. komihevitraense
- B. mullerriedi
- B. robustum
- B. sutherlandi
- B. victoris

== Distribution ==
Fossils of Beudanticeras have been found in Angola, Antarctica, Argentina, Australia, Canada (British Columbia, Northwest Territories, Nunavut), Colombia (Hiló Formation, Tolima), the Dominican Republic, Egypt, France, Germany, Greenland, Iran, Madagascar, Mexico, Morocco, Mozambique, the Netherlands Antilles, Peru, the Russian Federation, South Africa, Switzerland, the United Kingdom, United States (Arizona, California) and Venezuela.
