= Uhligella =

Uhligella Temporal range: L Cret (U Apt - L Alb)

Scientific classification
- Kingdom: Animalia
- Phylum: Mollusca
- Class: Cephalopoda
- Subclass: †Ammonoidea
- Order: †Ammonitida
- Family: †Desmoceratidae
- Genus: †Uhligella; Jacob, 1907

Genus of molluscs (fossil)

Uhligella is an extinct cephalopod genus from the Early Cretaceous (Late Aptian to Early Albian), belonging to the ammonoid subclass and included in the Desmoceratidae.

Uhligella is described as being high-whorled with a broadly or narrowly rounded venter, in which the early whorls have strong or weak sinuous ribs but the outer whorls are smooth.

Uhligella may have given rise to Beudanticeras and is preceded by another related genus, Zurcherella.

== Distribution ==
Fossils of Uhligella have been found in Argentina, Colombia (Hiló Formation, Tolima and in La Guajira), France, Madagascar, Mexico, Morocco, the United Kingdom, the United States (Arkansas), and Venezuela.
