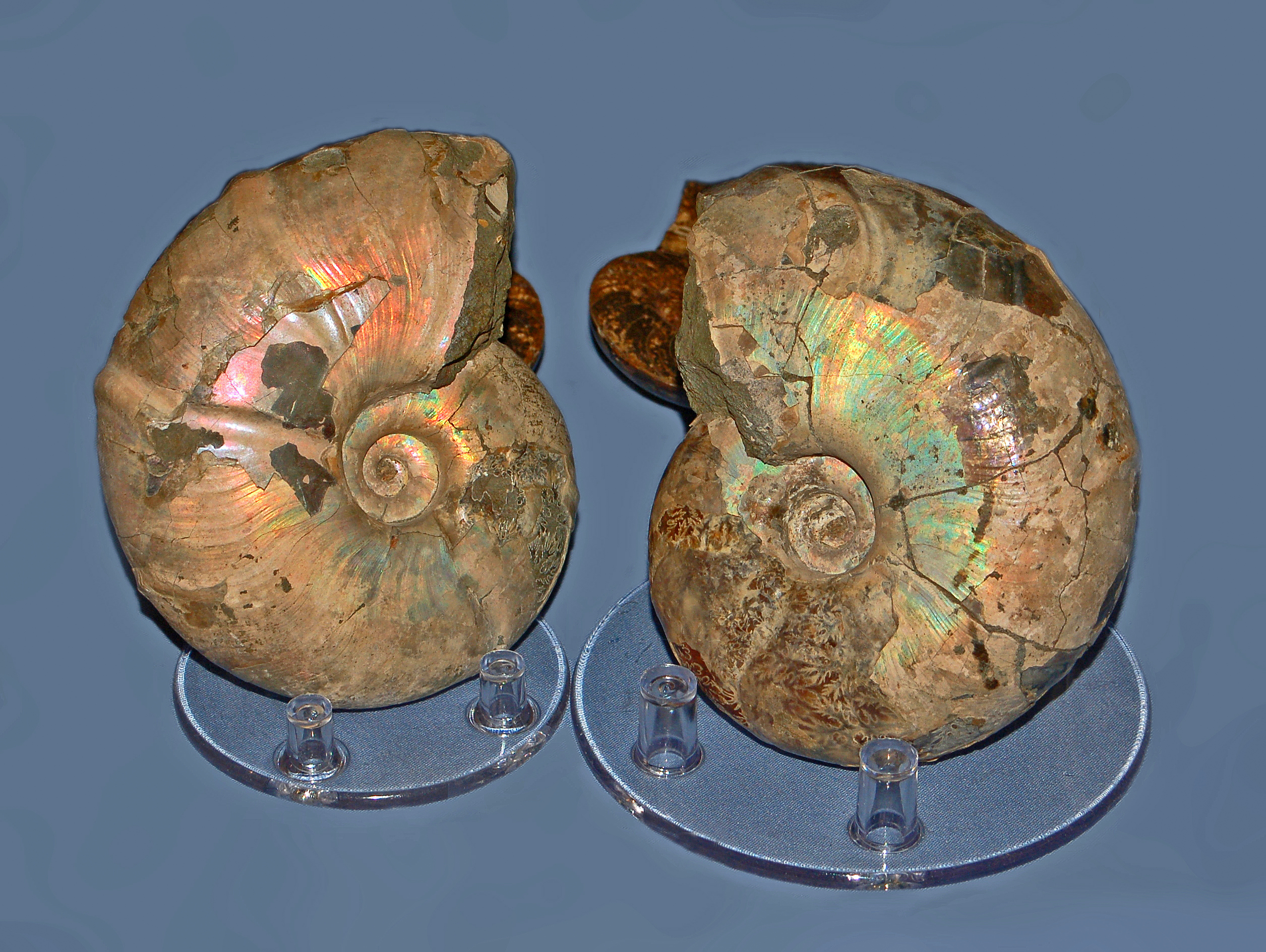
- Desmoceras sp. – Lower Cretaceous (Albian) from Mahajanga, Madagascar

Scientific classification
- Kingdom: Animalia
- Phylum: Mollusca
- Class: Cephalopoda
- Subclass: †Ammonoidea
- Order: †Ammonitida
- Family: †Desmoceratidae
- Subfamily: †Desmoceratinae
- Genus: †Desmoceras; Zittel, 1884

= Desmoceras =

Desmoceras Temporal range: Albian

Genus of molluscs (fossil)

Desmoceras is a genus of ammonites belonging to the family Desmoceratidae. These cephalopods were fast-moving nektonic carnivores. They lived in the Early Cretaceous; Albian epoch.

== Species ==
- Desmoceras alamoense
- Desmoceras argonauticum
- Desmoceras austeni
- Desmoceras barryae
- Desmoceras chimuense
- Desmoceras ezoanum
- Desmoceras inane
- Desmoceras latidorsatum
- Desmoceras pseudinane
- Desmoceras pseudouhligella
- Desmoceras uhligella

== Distribution ==
Cretaceous of Angola, Antarctica, Australia, Canada, Colombia (Hiló Formation), Egypt, France, Germany, Italy, Japan, Madagascar (Mahajanga Province), Mexico, Morocco, Nigeria, Peru, Russia, United Kingdom, United States and Venezuela.

== Gallery ==
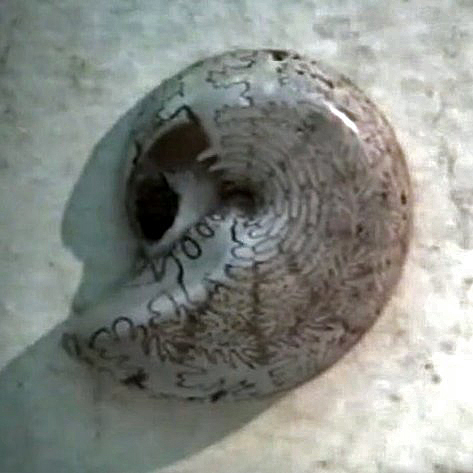
Desmoceras latidorsatum. Salzburg, Haus der Natur

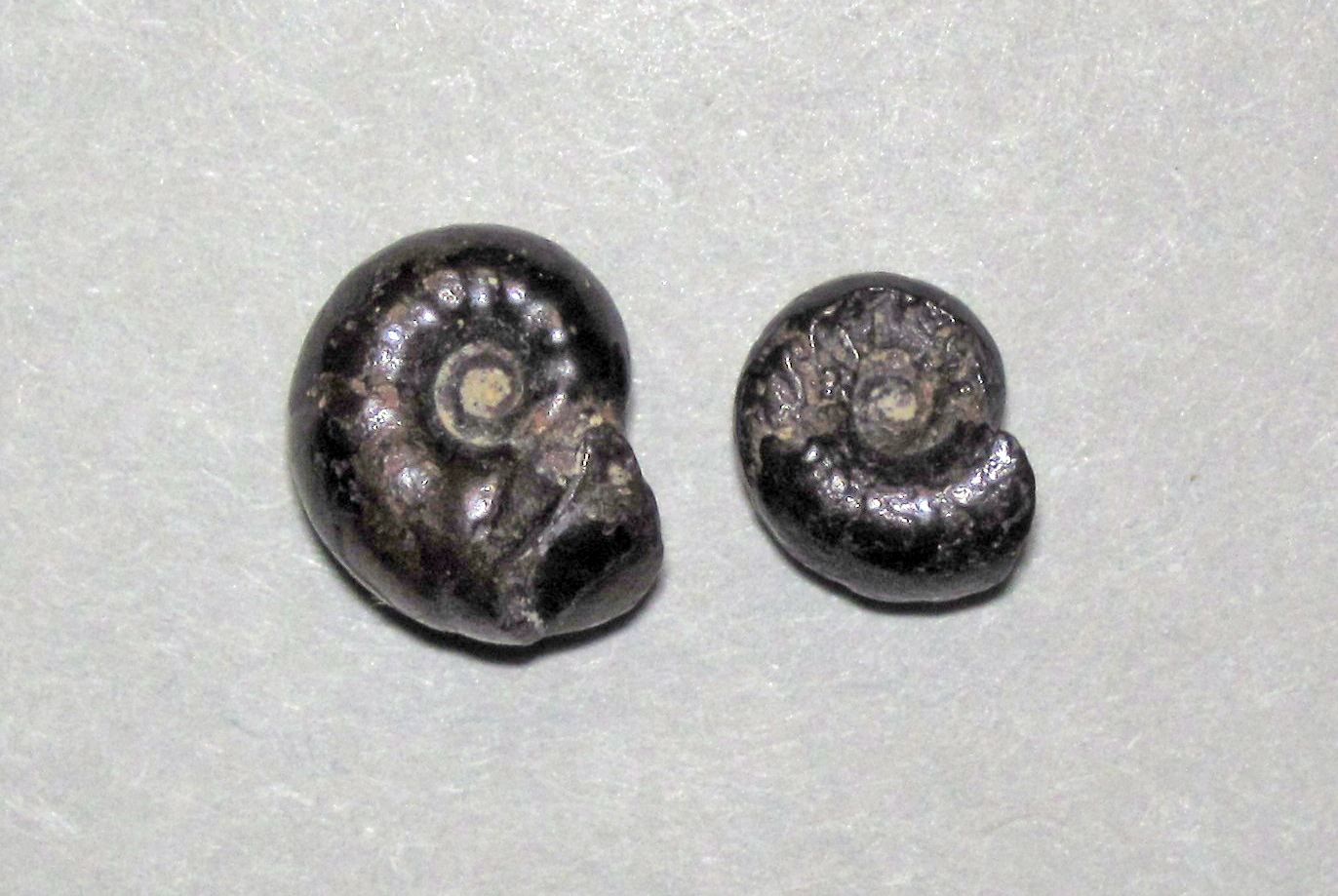
Desmoceras carolense, Bathurst Island, Australia

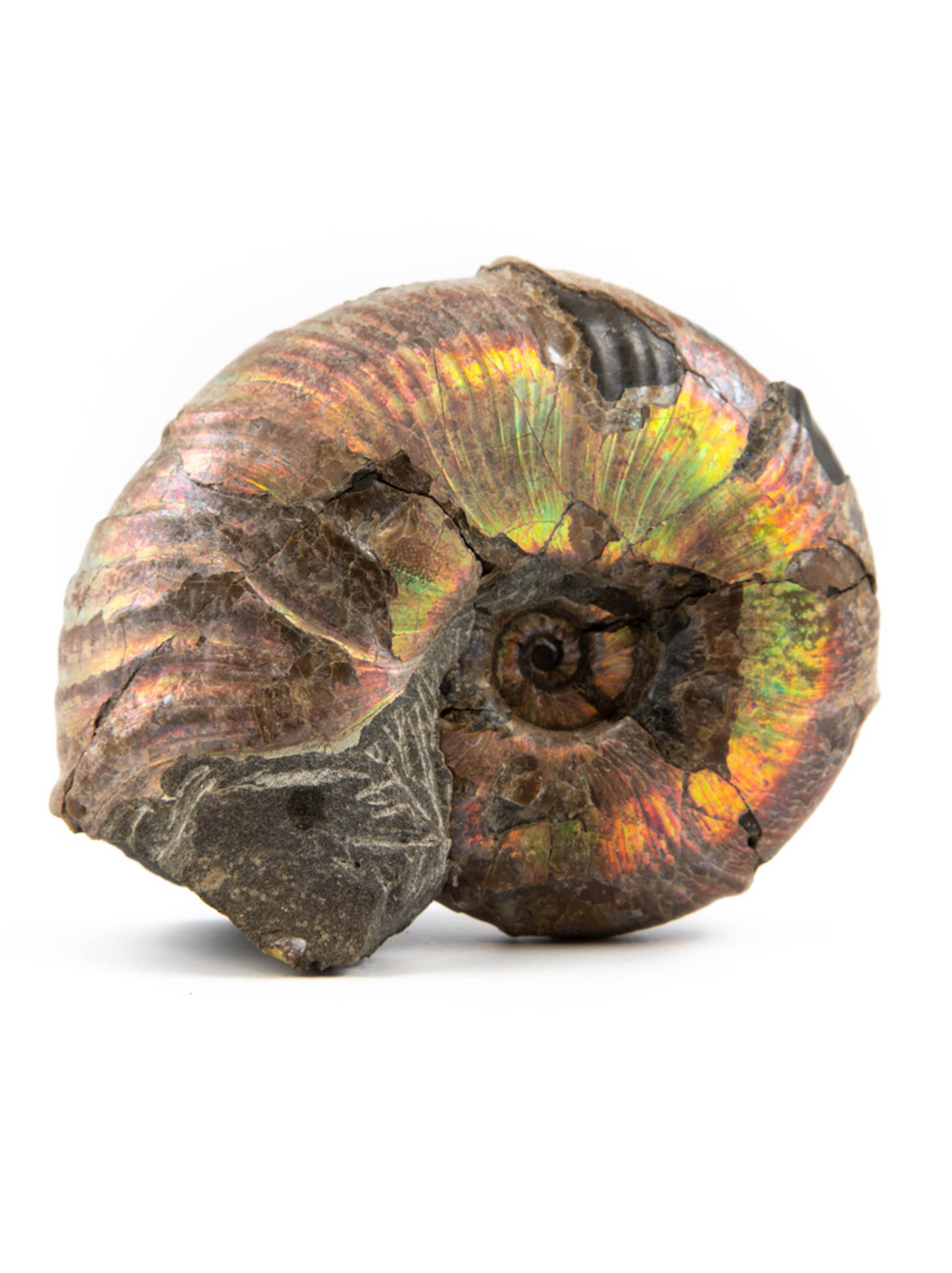
Desmoceras sp., Lower Cretaceous (Aptian). Russia, Goryachy Klyuch, The Museum of I. D. Popko
