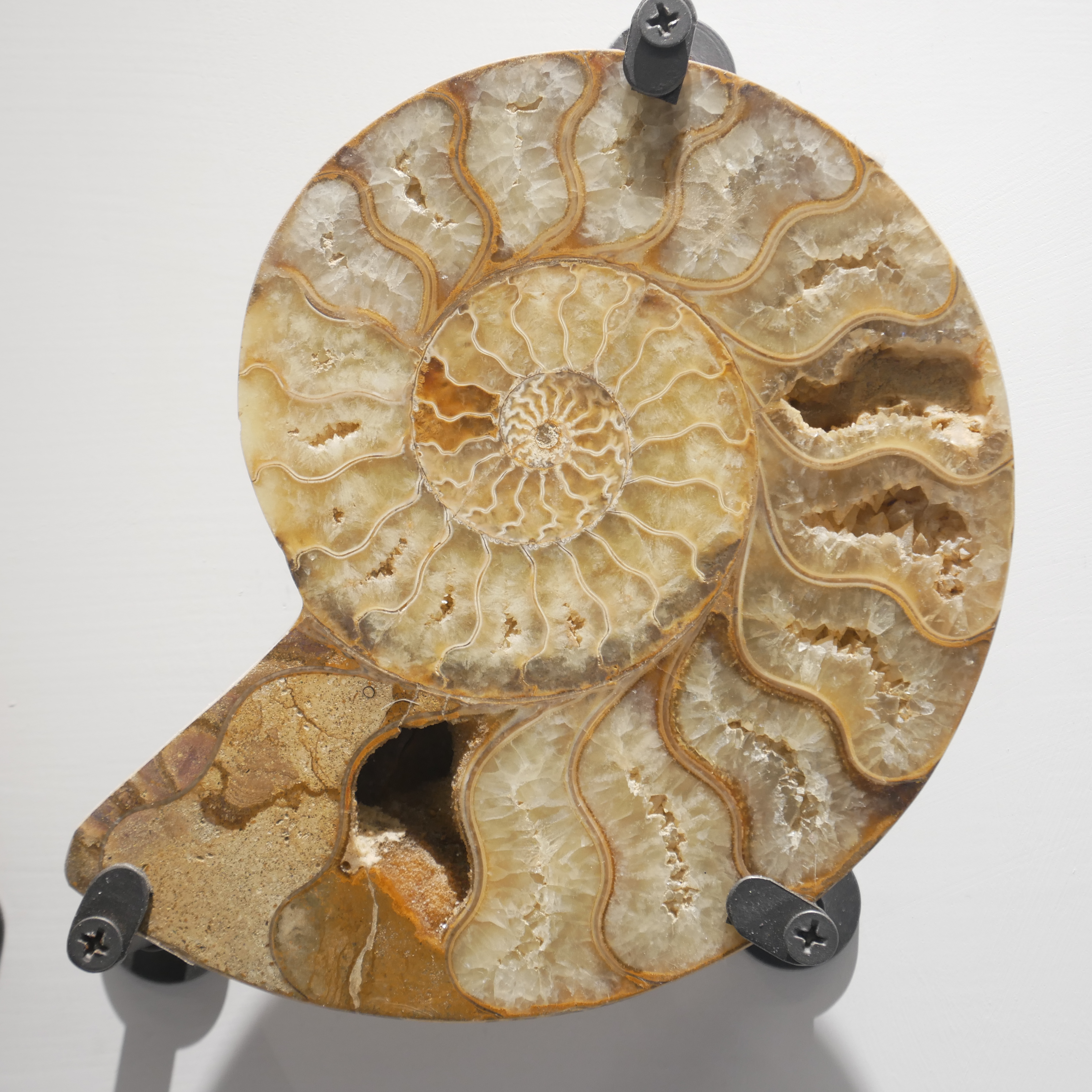
- Beudanticeras ambanjabense

Scientific classification
- Kingdom: Animalia
- Phylum: Mollusca
- Class: Cephalopoda
- Subclass: †Ammonoidea
- Order: †Ammonitida
- Superfamily: †Desmoceratoidea
- Family: †Desmoceratidae; Zittel, 1895

Genera
- Abrytasites; Barremites; Beudanticeras; Damesites; Desmoceras; Freboldiceras; Hauericeras; Kennicottia; Mesopuzosia; Pachydesmoceras; Paradamesites; Parapuzosia; Puzosia

= Desmoceratidae =

Desmoceratidae Temporal range: Valanginian - Maastrichtian

Family of molluscs (fossil)

Desmoceratidae is a family belonging to the ammonite superfamily Desmoceratoidea. They are an extinct group of ammonoids, shelled cephalopods related to squid, belemnites, octopuses, and cuttlefish, and more distantly to the nautiloids, that lived between the Lower Cretaceous (Upper Valanginian) and Upper Cretaceous (Upper Maastrichtian).
