= Raymondoceratinae =

Scientific classification
- Kingdom: Animalia
- Phylum: Mollusca
- Class: Cephalopoda
- Subclass: †Ammonoidea
- Order: †Goniatitida
- Family: †Prolobitidae
- Subfamily: †Raymondoceratinae; Miller & Furnish, 1957

Genera
- Melonites; Raymondiceras; Roinghites

Extinct subfamily of molluscs

Raymondoceratinae is one of two subfamilies of the Prolobitidae family, a member of the Goniatitida order. They are an extinct group of ammonoid, which are shelled cephalopods related to squids, belemnites, octopodes, and cuttlefish, and more distantly to the nautiloids.
