= Melonites =

Melonites is the scientific name of two genera of organisms and may refer to:

- Melonites (echinoderm) Norwood & Owen, 1846, a genus of sea urchins in the family Palaechinidae
- Melonites (ammonite) Bogoslovskii, 1971, a genus of cephalopods in the family Cheiloceratidae
