= Roinghites =

Roinghites Temporal range: Famennian

Scientific classification
- Kingdom: Animalia
- Phylum: Mollusca
- Class: Cephalopoda
- Subclass: †Ammonoidea
- Order: †Goniatitida
- Family: †Cheiloceratidae
- Subfamily: †Raymondiceratinae
- Genus: †Roinghites; Korn, 2002

Genus of molluscs (fossil)

Roinghites is genus of ammonoid cephalopod belonging to the Cheiloceratidae family. Species belonging to this genus lived in late Devonian (Famennian).

== Species and distribution ==
- Roinghites aktubensis Bogoslovskii, 1960: ca 370.0 - 367.6 mya of Kazakhstan (South Urals). Originally named as Raymondiceras aktubense
- Roinghites bottkei Korn, 2002: ca 367.6 - 366.8 mya of Germany (Rhenish mountains). Type species of genus.
