= Cyrtoclymeniaceae =

Cyrtoclymeniaceae Temporal range: 370.6–360.7 Ma

Scientific classification
- Domain: Eukaryota
- Kingdom: Animalia
- Phylum: Mollusca
- Class: Cephalopoda
- Subclass: †Ammonoidea
- Order: †Clymeniida
- Suborder: †Cyrtoclymeniina
- Superfamily: †Cyrtoclymeniaceae; Hyatt, 1884

Families
- †Carinoclymeniidae; †Cymaclymeniidae; †Cyrtoclymeniidae; †Rectoclymeniidae

Extinct superfamily of ammonites

Cyrtoclymeniaceae was an extinct superfamily of ammonites that existed during the Devonian.
