= Chorisastrea =

Scientific classification
- Domain: Eukaryota
- Kingdom: Animalia
- Phylum: Cnidaria
- Class: Hexacorallia
- Order: Scleractinia
- Family: †Calamophylliidae
- Genus: †Chorisastre; Frech, 1896

Species
- †Chorisastrea caquerellensis Koby, 1885; †Chorisastrea elegans Koby, 1885; †Chorisastrea glomerata Koby, 1885; †Chorisastrea sp. Gill, 1967

Extinct genus of corals

Chorisastrea is an extinct genus of stony corals.

Fossilworks considers Chorisastrea Fromentel 1861 to be a synonym of †Latomeandra Milne-Edwards and Haime 1849 (Latomeandridae).
