= Prolobitidae =

Prolobitidae Temporal range: Middle to Late Devonian

Scientific classification
- Kingdom: Animalia
- Phylum: Mollusca
- Class: Cephalopoda
- Subclass: †Ammonoidea
- Order: †Goniatitida
- Superfamily: †Dimeroceratoidea
- Family: †Prolobitidae; Wedekind, 1913

Subfamilies
- Prolobitinae; Raymondoceratinae

Extinct family of molluscs

Prolobitidae is a family of extinct ammonoid cephalopods that lived during the Middle and Late Devonian period, approximately 387 to 359 million years ago. The family is currently classified within the goniatitid suborder Tornoceratina and superfamily Dimeroceratoidea, though it was previously placed in the ancestral Anarcestida. The family was established by German paleontologist Rudolf Wedekind in 1913.

== Description ==
Prolobitids are characterized by goniatitic sutures with an undivided ventral lobe and primary lateral lobes that are introduced in the umbilical region. Their shells range from discoidal (disc-shaped) to subglobular in form, with some species bearing transverse ribs. The umbilicus is generally moderate to closed.

== Classification ==
The family Prolobitidae is divided into two subfamilies:

- Prolobitinae – characterized by subglobular to subdiscoidal shells with moderate to closed umbilici
- Raymondoceratinae – characterized by discoidal shells with transverse ribs and large umbilici

The type genus is Prolobites, which is known primarily from the Famennian stage of the Late Devonian. This genus gives its name to a biostratigraphic marker, the Prolobites delphinus Zone, which is used for correlation of mid-Famennian strata in regions such as the Rhenish Mountains of Germany.

== Evolutionary significance ==
The Prolobitidae are of considerable evolutionary importance as they have been considered the likely ancestors for the order Prolecanitida. The Prolecanitida, though not as diverse as their goniatitid contemporaries, survived for approximately 108 million years from the Devonian–Carboniferous boundary to the Early Triassic and provided the ancestral stock from which all later Mesozoic ammonoids were derived.

== Paleobiology ==
Research on the genus Prolobites has provided insights into the reproductive biology of Devonian ammonoids. A 2010 study by Walton, Korn, and Klug examined size distributions of Prolobites delphinus specimens from localities in the Rhenish Mountains and found that nearly all preserved specimens are adults showing terminal growth stages. This contrasts markedly with co-occurring ammonoid genera such as Sporadoceras, Prionoceras, and Platyclymenia, which show mixed age populations.

The predominance of adult specimens and the limited geographic range of Prolobites suggest possible mass spawning events similar to those observed in modern coleoid cephalopods such as the squid Todarodes filippovae. This evidence supports the hypothesis that at least some Devonian ammonoids may have been semelparous, dying after a single reproductive event.

== Distribution ==
Prolobitid fossils are known primarily from Devonian marine deposits in Europe, particularly the Rhenish Mountains of Germany, where extensive studies have been conducted on Famennian ammonoid faunas.

== See also ==
- Goniatitida
- Tornoceratina
- Prolecanitida
- Devonian
