= Cheiloceratinae =

Scientific classification
- Kingdom: Animalia
- Phylum: Mollusca
- Class: Cephalopoda
- Subclass: †Ammonoidea
- Order: †Goniatitida
- Family: †Cheiloceratidae
- Subfamily: †Cheiloceratinae; Frech, 1897

Genera
- Cheiloceras; Dyscheiloceras; Paratorleyoceras; Staffites; Torleyoceras

Extinct subfamily of molluscs

Cheiloceratinae is one of two subfamilies of the Cheiloceratidae family, a member of the Goniatitida order. They are an extinct group of ammonoid, which are shelled cephalopods related to squids, belemnites, octopuses, and cuttlefish, and more distantly to the nautiloids.
