= Clymenia =

Clymenia may refer to:

- Clymenia (ammonite), an ammonite genus in the family Clymeniidae
- Clymenia (plant), a flowering plant genus in the family Rutaceae
