= Dimeroceratoidea =

Dimeroceratoidea Temporal range: Devonian

Scientific classification
- Domain: Eukaryota
- Kingdom: Animalia
- Phylum: Mollusca
- Class: Cephalopoda
- Subclass: †Ammonoidea
- Order: †Goniatitida
- Suborder: †Tornoceratina
- Superfamily: †Dimeroceratoidea; Hyatt 1884

Families
- Dimeroceratidae; Cheiloceratidae; Prolobitidae; Phenacoceratidae

Synonyms
- Dimerocerataceae

Extinct superfamily of molluscs

Dimeroceratoidea, formerly Dimerocerataceae, is one of six superfamilies in the goniatitid suborder Tornoceratina which lived during the Devonian. Five families are included, the Dimeroceratidae being the type family.

Gonitites, to which they belong, are primitive ammonites sensu lato, extinct shelled cephalopods more closely related to living animals like squids and octopodes than to similarly shelled nautiloids such as the modern genus Nautilus.
