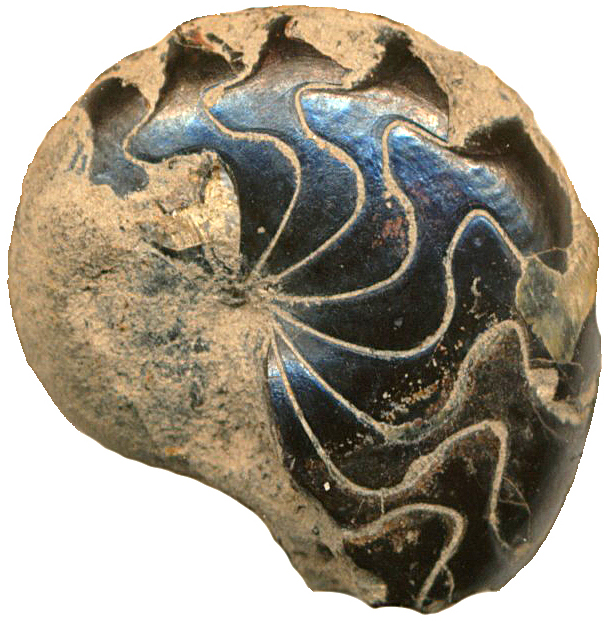

Scientific classification
- Domain: Eukaryota
- Kingdom: Animalia
- Phylum: Mollusca
- Class: Cephalopoda
- Subclass: †Ammonoidea
- Order: †Goniatitida
- Family: †Cheiloceratidae
- Subfamily: †Cheiloceratinae
- Genus: †Cheiloceras; Frech, 1897

Subgenera
- See text

= Cheiloceras =

Cheiloceras Temporal range: Upper Devonian

Extinct genus of molluscs

Cheiloceras is a subglobular to thickly lenticular goniatite with a closed umbilicus from the Upper Devonian and type genus for the Cheiloceratidae.

Cheiloceras is sometimes split into at least three subgenera. Cheiloceras (Cheiloceras) has evolute juvenile stages, the umbilicus closing later, while C. (Compactoceras) is subglobular with involute whorls in the early stage, later becoming compressed in form, and C. (Puncticeras) is involute in all stages. Eucheiloceras is another name for C. (Cheiloceras).

Related genera in the Cheiloceratidae include Staffites and Dyscheiloceras.
