= Biloclymenioidea =

Biloclymenioidea Temporal range: 364.7–360.7 Ma

Scientific classification
- Domain: Eukaryota
- Kingdom: Animalia
- Phylum: Mollusca
- Class: Cephalopoda
- Subclass: †Ammonoidea
- Order: †Clymeniida
- Suborder: †Cyrtoclymeniina
- Superfamily: †Biloclymenioidea; Bogoslovsky, 1955

Families
- †Biloclymeniidae; †Pachyclymeniidae

Synonyms
- Biloclymeniaceae

Extinct superfamily of ammonites

Biloclymenioidea, formerly Biloclymeniaceae, is an extinct superfamily of ammonites that existed during the Devonian.
