= Nehdenitinae =

Scientific classification
- Kingdom: Animalia
- Phylum: Mollusca
- Class: Cephalopoda
- Subclass: †Ammonoidea
- Order: †Goniatitida
- Family: †Cheiloceratidae
- Subfamily: †Nehdenitinae; Korn, 2002

Genera
- Nehdenites; Praemeroceras; Puncticeras

Subfamily of molluscs (fossil)

Nehdenitinae is one of two subfamilies of the Cheiloceratidae family, a member of the Goniatitida order. They are an extinct group of ammonoid, which are shelled cephalopods related to squids, belemnites, octopuses, and cuttlefish, and more distantly to the nautiloids.
