= Pachyclymeniidae =

Pachyclymeniidae Temporal range: 364.7–360.7 Ma

Scientific classification
- Domain: Eukaryota
- Kingdom: Animalia
- Phylum: Mollusca
- Class: Cephalopoda
- Subclass: †Ammonoidea
- Order: †Clymeniida
- Superfamily: †Biloclymeniaceae
- Family: †Pachyclymeniidae; Korn, 1992

Genera
- †Pachyclymenia; †Uraloclymenia

Extinct family of ammonites

Pachyclymeniidae was an extinct family of ammonites that existed during the Devonian.
