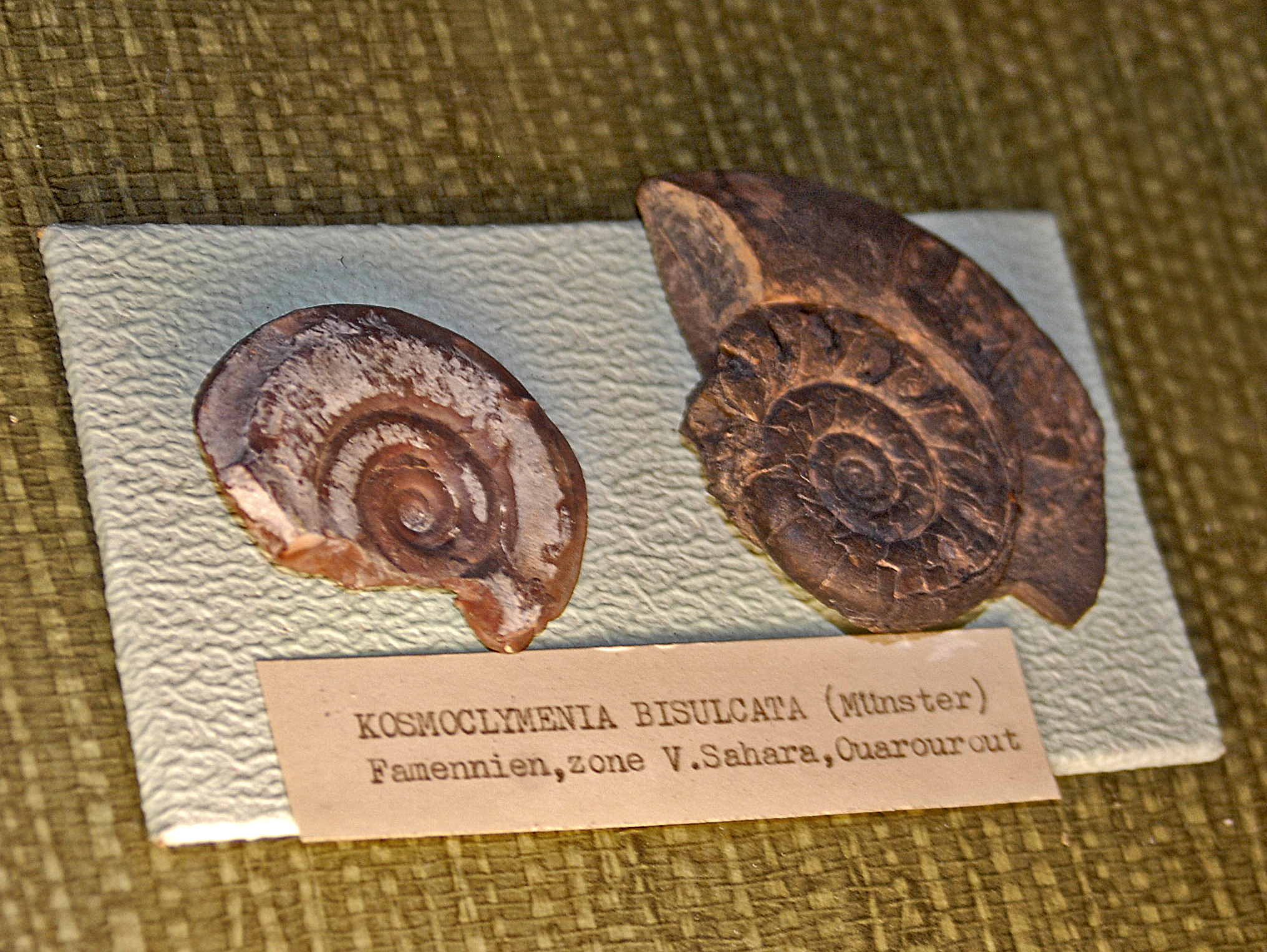
- Fossil of Kosmoclymenia (Muessenbiaergia) bisulcata from Sahara, on display at Galerie de paléontologie et d'anatomie comparée in Paris

Scientific classification
- Kingdom: Animalia
- Phylum: Mollusca
- Class: Cephalopoda
- Subclass: †Ammonoidea
- Order: †Clymeniida
- Family: †Kosmoclymeniidae
- Genus: †Kosmoclymenia; Schindewolf, 1949

= Kosmoclymenia =

Kosmoclymenia Temporal range: Devonian (Famennian), 364.7–360.7 Ma

Genus of molluscs (fossil)

Kosmoclymenia is a genus in the ammonoid order Clymeniida, in the family Kosmoclymeniidae.

== Species ==
- Kosmoclymenia (Kosmoclymenia) callima
- Kosmoclymenia (Kosmoclymenia) effenbergensis
- Kosmoclymenia (Kosmoclymenia) inaequistriata
- Kosmoclymenia (Kosmoclymenia) lamellistriata
- Kosmoclymenia (Kosmoclymenia) schindewolfi
- Kosmoclymenia (Kosmoclymenia) tenuissima
- Kosmoclymenia (Kosmoclymenia) timida
- Kosmoclymenia (Kosmoclymenia) undulata ptychofera
- Kosmoclymenia (Kosmoclymenia) undulata
- Kosmoclymenia (Linguaclymenia) clauseni
- Kosmoclymenia (Linguaclymenia) dzikowiecensis
- Kosmoclymenia (Linguaclymenia) similis
- Kosmoclymenia (Lissoclymenia) wocklumeri
- Kosmoclymenia (Muessenbiaergia) ademmeri
- Kosmoclymenia (Muessenbiaergia) bisulcata
- Kosmoclymenia (Muessenbiaergia) caucasica
- Kosmoclymenia (Muessenbiaergia) colubrina
- Kosmoclymenia (Muessenbiaergia) diversa
- Kosmoclymenia (Muessenbiaergia) galeata
- Kosmoclymenia (Muessenbiaergia) kowalensis
- Kosmoclymenia (Muessenbiaergia) levis
- Kosmoclymenia (Muessenbiaergia) marukhensis
- Kosmoclymenia (Muessenbiaergia) parundulata
- Kosmoclymenia (Muessenbiaergia) sublaevis
- Kosmoclymenia (Muessenbiaergia) xenostriata
- Kosmoclymenia (Muessenbiaergia?) coronata
- Kosmoclymenia lamellosa
- Kosmoclymenia linearis

== Description ==
Shells of these extinct cephalopods can reach a maximum diameter of 110 millimetres (4.3 in). They were fast-moving nektonic carnivores.

== Distribution ==
Fossils of species within this genus have been found in the Devonian of China, Germany and Morocco.
