= Pinacoclymenia =

Scientific classification
- Domain: Eukaryota
- Kingdom: Animalia
- Phylum: Mollusca
- Class: Cephalopoda
- Subclass: †Ammonoidea
- Order: †Clymeniida
- Family: †Carinoclymeniidae
- Genus: †Pinacoclymenia; Bogoslovsky, 1975

Genus of molluscs (fossil)

Pinacoclymenia was a genus of ammonites that existed during the Devonian.
