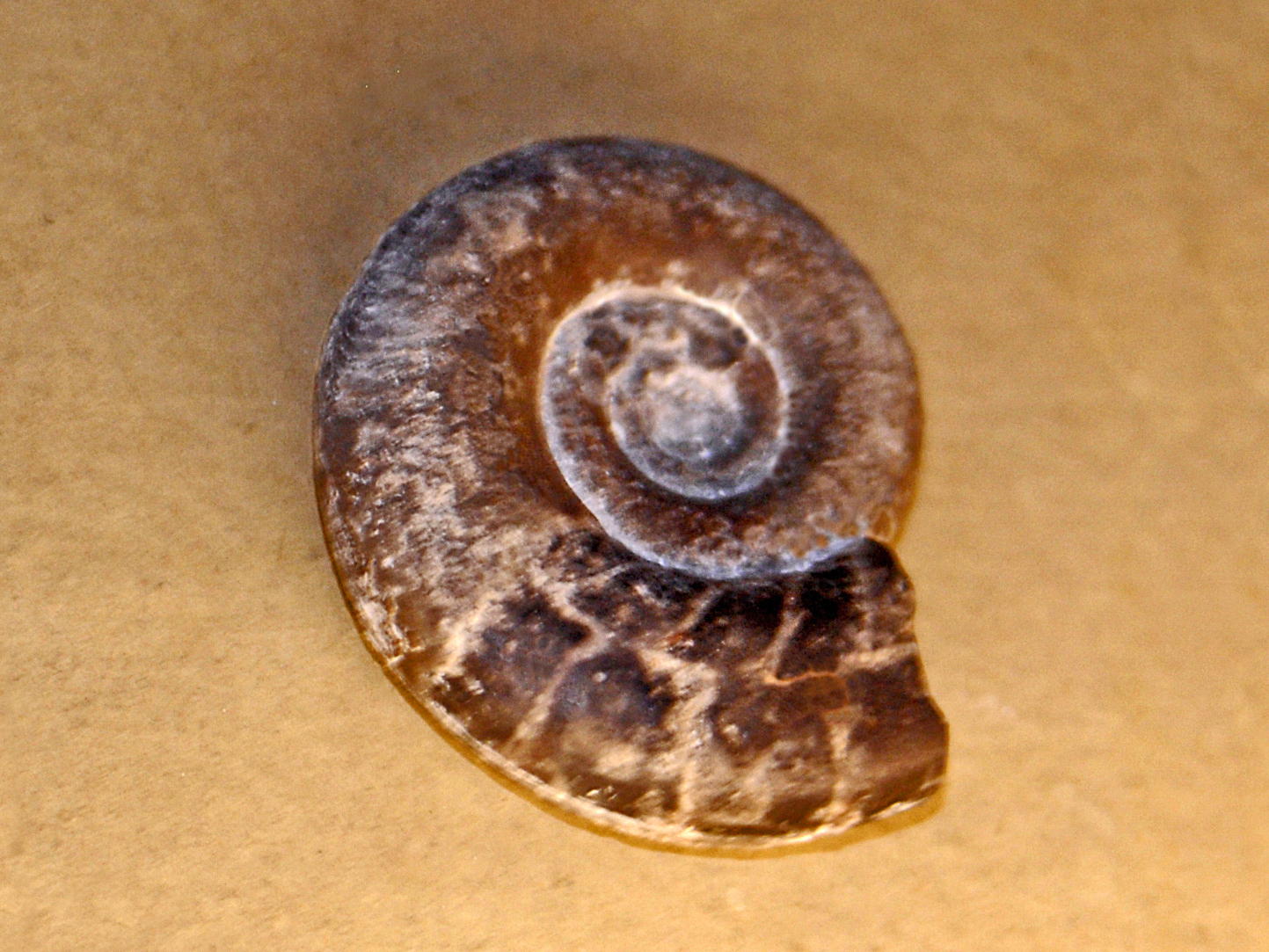
- Fossil shell of Clymenia laevigata, on display at Galerie de paléontologie et d'anatomie comparée, Paris

Scientific classification
- Domain: Eukaryota
- Kingdom: Animalia
- Phylum: Mollusca
- Class: Cephalopoda
- Subclass: †Ammonoidea
- Order: †Clymeniida
- Family: †Clymeniidae
- Genus: †Clymenia
- Species: †C. laevigata

Binomial name
- †Clymenia laevigata Munster, 1839

= Clymenia laevigata =

Clymenia laevigata Temporal range: Upper Devonian, 364.7–360.7 Ma

Species of mollusc

Clymenia laevigata is a species of extinct cephalopods in the ammonoid order Clymeniida.

== Distribution ==
Fossils of this species have been found in the Devonian of Australia, United Kingdom, Poland and Morocco.
