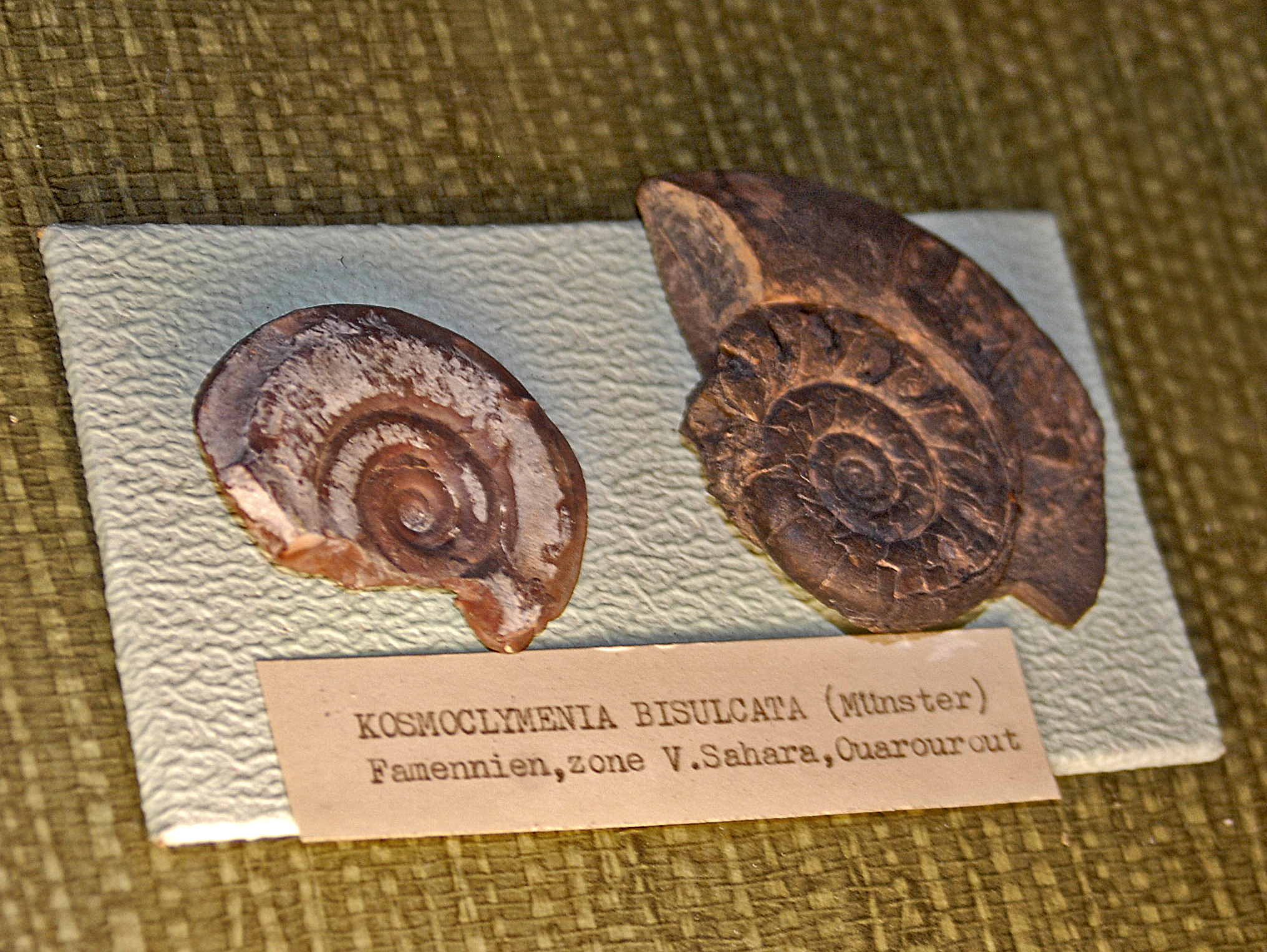
- Fossil of Kosmoclymenia (Muessenbiaergia) bisulcata from Sahara, on display at Galerie de paléontologie et d'anatomie comparée in Paris

Scientific classification
- Kingdom: Animalia
- Phylum: Mollusca
- Class: Cephalopoda
- Subclass: †Ammonoidea
- Order: †Clymeniida
- Family: †Kosmoclymeniidae; Korn and Price, 1987

= Kosmoclymeniidae =

Kosmoclymeniidae Temporal range: Devonian (Famennian), 364.7–360.7 Ma

Kosmoclymeniidae is a family in the ammonoid order Clymeniida. They were fast-moving nektonic carnivores.

== Subfamilies and genera ==
- Kosmoclymeniinae Korn and Price 1987
  - Kosmoclymenia Schindewolf 1949
  - Linguaclymenia Korn and Price 1987
  - Lissoclymenia Korn and Price 1987
  - Muessenbiaergia Korn and Price 1987
- Rodeckiinae Korn 2002
  - Franconiclymenia Korn and Price 1987
  - Protoxyclymenia Schindewolf 1923
  - Rodeckia Korn 2002

== Distribution ==
Fossils of species within this family have been found in the Devonian of Austria, China. Germany and Morocco.
