= Raymondiceratinae =

Raymondiceratinae Temporal range: Upper Devonian

Scientific classification
- Kingdom: Animalia
- Phylum: Mollusca
- Class: Cephalopoda
- Subclass: †Ammonoidea
- Order: †Goniatitida
- Family: †Cheiloceratidae
- Subfamily: †Raymondiceratinae; Furnish, 1957

Genera
- See text

Extinct subfamily of molluscs

Raymondiceratinae is a subfamily of Upper Devonian cheiloceratid goniatites in which the sutures have 4 distinct lobes and the growth lines are convex. The subfamily includes three genera.

- Raymondiceras. named by Schindewolf, 1934 which has a subglubular shell with small closed umbilici and sutures with an incipient lobe in the first lateral saddle. Type genus.
- Melonites named by Bogoslovskii 1971, which was moved from Cheiloceratidae to Raymondiceratineae by Korn & Klug, 2002.
- Roinghites named by Korn 2002, which has a thick discoidal shell, with closed umbilici in the adult; fine, convex growth lines and a very shallow, weakly and widely rounded lateral lobe.
