= Carinoclymenia =

Carinoclymenia Temporal range: 370.6–364.7 Ma

Scientific classification
- Domain: Eukaryota
- Kingdom: Animalia
- Phylum: Mollusca
- Class: Cephalopoda
- Subclass: †Ammonoidea
- Order: †Clymeniida
- Family: †Carinoclymeniidae
- Genus: †Carinoclymenia; Bogoslovsky, 1965

Genus of molluscs (fossil)

Carinoclymenia was a genus of ammonites that existed during the Devonian.
