= Soliclymenia =

Soliclymenia Temporal range: Late Devonian

Scientific classification
- Kingdom: Animalia
- Phylum: Mollusca
- Class: Cephalopoda
- Subclass: †Ammonoidea
- Order: †Clymeniida
- Family: †Glatziellidae
- Genus: †Soliclymenia; Schindewolf, 1937

Genus of molluscs (fossil)

Soliclymenia is a genus of ammonites from the Late Devonian. S. paradoxa has an unusual, triangularly-coiled shell. Additional genera of ammonites with triangular shells are Kamptoclymenia, Trigonoshumardites, and Trigonogastrioceras. Soliclymenia semiparadoxa, which is known only from the holotype, is semi-triangular, the innermost whorls being circular. Other species of this genus, including S. solarioides and S. recticostata, have a circularly-coiled shell.
