= Kiaclymenia =

Kiaclymenia Temporal range: 364.7–360.7 Ma

Scientific classification
- Domain: Eukaryota
- Kingdom: Animalia
- Phylum: Mollusca
- Class: Cephalopoda
- Subclass: †Ammonoidea
- Order: †Clymeniida
- Family: †Biloclymeniidae
- Genus: †Kiaclymenia; Bogoslovsky, 1965

Genus of molluscs (fossil)

Kiaclymenia was an extinct genus of ammonites that existed during the Devonian.
