= Fritz Frech =

German geologist and paleontologist (1861–1917)

Fritz Daniel Frech (26 March 1861 – 28 September 1917) was a German geologist and paleontologist.

Frech was born in Berlin. He studied natural sciences at the universities of Leipzig, Bonn and Berlin, receiving his doctorate in 1882 with a thesis on the coral fauna of the Late Devonian period in Germany. In 1887 he obtained his habilitation from the University of Halle, and in 1897 was appointed a full professor of geology and paleontology at the University of Breslau. In 1912 he was named vice-president of the newly formed Paläontologischen Gesellschaft. During World War I, he died in Aleppo while serving as a senior geologist under the command of the German army.

He published extensively on fossil invertebrates, being especially interested in extinct fauna from a stratigraphic-geological perspective. From 1913 he was an editor of the "Neues Jahrbuch für Mineralogie, Geologie and Paläontologie".

== Selected works ==
- Lethae geognostica: Handbuch der Erdgeschichte mit Abbildungen der für die Formationen bezeichnendsten Versteinerungen, (3 volumes, 1876–. with Ferdinand von Roemer) – Lethae geognostica; handbook of geological history with pictures of the most significant of the fossil formations (Frech wrote most of the section dealing with Palaeozoic formations and all of the volume describing the Triassic).
- Geologie der Umgegend von Haiger bei Dillenburg (Nassau) Nebst einem palaeontologischen anhang, 1888 – Geology of the environs of Haiger near Dillenburg (Nassau) along with palaeontological notes.
- Die Karnischen Alpen ein beitrag zur vergleichenden gebirgs-tektonik, 1892 – The Carnic Alps, a contribution to comparative mountain-tectonics.
- Die Steinkohlenformation, 1899 – Coal formation.
- Aus der vorzeit der erde, 1910 – On the prehistoric earth.
- Ammoneae devonicae (clymeniidae, aphyllitidae, gephyroceratidae, cheiloceratidae), 1913 – Devonian ammonites (Clymeniidae, Aphyllitidae, Gephyroceratidae, Cheiloceratidae). Part of the series "Fossilium catalogus".
- Allgemeine geologie, 1914 – General geology.
