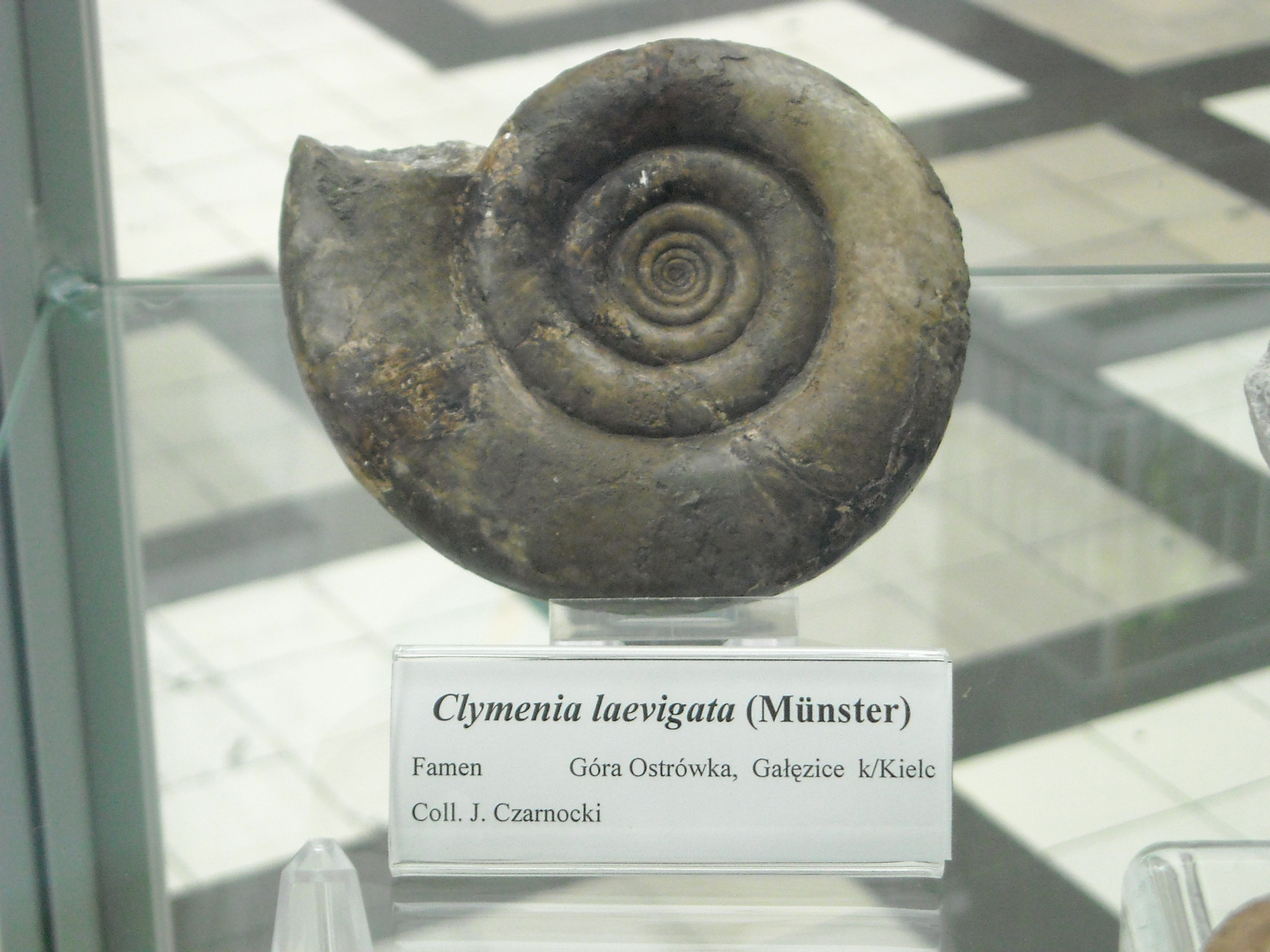
- Clymenia laevigata

Scientific classification
- Kingdom: Animalia
- Phylum: Mollusca
- Class: Cephalopoda
- Subclass: †Ammonoidea
- Order: †Clymeniida; Hyatt, 1884

Suborders
- Clymeniina; Cyrtoclymeniina

= Clymeniida =

Clymeniida Temporal range: Upper Devonian

Extinct order of molluscs

Clymeniida is an order of ammonoid cephalopods from the Upper Devonian characterized by having an unusual dorsal siphuncle. They measured about 4 cm (1.6 in) in diameter and are most common in Europe, North Africa, and South China but are known from North America (New York, Ohio, Oklahoma, and Utah) and Australia (New South Wales) as well.

== Morphologic characteristics ==
Clymeniids produced a variety of shells ranging from smooth to ribbed and spinose, from evolute with all whorls exposed to strongly involute with the last whorl covering the previous. Some were even triangular in lateral view. With the exception of the first few chambers, all have a siphuncle that runs along the dorsal margin, i.e., along the inner edge of each whorl, rather than the outer edge as in most ammonoids.

Developmentally, the siphuncle in clymeniids starts off ventrally, like that in other ammonoids, but after the first few septa it migrates to a dorsal position indefinitely. Septal necks are retrosiphonate, characteristic of their nautiloid ancestors, and are commonly very long, forming an almost continuous siphuncular tube. The septa, unusually simplified in shape, are convex toward the front as is characteristic of ammonoids.

== Classification ==
Miller, Furnish, and Schindewolf, 1957, in Part L of the Treatise on Invertebrate Paleontology included three superfamilies in Clymeniida: Gonioclymeniaceae, Clymeniaceae, and Parawocklumeriaceae. Gonoclymeniaceae unites five families, Clymeniaceae three. Parawocklumeraceae was established for the single family Parawocklumeriidae.

In 1999, Saunders, Work, and Nikolaeva divided Clymeniida into two suborders, Gonioclymeniina and Clymeniina. Gonioclymeniina includes Sellaclymeniaceae, with 7 families and 20 genera; Gonioclyemniaceae, containing a single family with six genera; and Parawocklumeraceae, also containing a single family but with only three genera. Clymeniina contains a single superfamily, Clymeniaceae, which unites five families with a total of 36 genera.

Per the GONIAT website, two suborders fall into Clymeniida. They are Clymeniina with four superfamilies and Gonioclymeniina, established for a single superfamily. In contrast, Dieter Korn in 2006 divided Clymeniida into Clymeniina and Cyrtoclymeniina, named by him in 2002. Shevyrev, on the other hand, in 2006 divided Clymeniida into Clymeniina and Gonioclymeniina, in line with GONIAT and with the work of Saunders, Work, and Nikolaeva. The Taxonomy section below presents Korn's (2006) classification.

== Taxonomy ==
Clymeniida

- Suborder Clymeniina Hyatt, 1884
  - Superfamily Clymeniaceae Edwards, 1849
    - Family Clymeniidae Edwards, 1849
      - Genus Aktuboclymenia Bogoslovsky, 1979
      - Genus Clymenia Münster, 1834
    - Family Kosmoclymeniidae Korn and Price, 1987
      - Subfamily Kosmoclymeniinae Korn and Price, 1987
        - Genus Kosmoclymenia Schindewolf, 1949
        - Genus Linguaclymenia Korn and Price, 1987
        - Genus Lissoclymenia Korn and Price, 1987
        - Genus Muessenbiaergia Korn and Price, 1987
      - Subfamily Rodeckiinae Korn 2002
        - Genus Franconiclymenia Korn and Price, 1987
        - Genus Protoxyclymenia Schindewolf, 1923
        - Genus Rodeckia Korn, 2002
  - Superfamily Gonioclymeniaceae Hyatt, 1884
    - Family Costaclymeniidae Ruzhencev, 1957
      - Genus Costaclymenia Schindewolf, 1920
      - Genus Endosiphonites Ansted, 1838
    - Family Gonioclymeniidae Hyatt, 1884
      - Genus Finiclymenia Price and Korn 1989
      - Genus Gonioclymenia Sepkoski, Jr., 2002
      - Genus Kalloclymenia Wedekind, 1914
      - Genus Leviclymenia Korn, 2002
      - Genus Mesoclymenia Bogoslovsky, 1981
    - Family Sellaclymeniidae Schindewolf, 1923
      - Genus Sellaclymenia Sepkoski, Jr., 2002
    - Family Sphenoclymeniidae Korn, 1992
      - Genus Medioclymenia Korn, 2002
      - Genus Sphenoclymenia Schindewolf, 1920
  - Superfamily Platyclymeniaceae Wedekind, 1914
    - Family Glatziellidae Schindewolf, 1928
      - Genus Glatziella Renz, 1914
      - Genus Liroclymenia Czarnocki, 1989
      - Genus Postglatziella Schindewolf, 1937
      - Genus Soliclymenia Schindewolf, 1937
    - Family Piriclymeniidae Korn, 1992
      - Genus Ornatoclymenia Bogoslovsky, 1979
      - Genus Piriclymenia Schindewolf, 1937
      - Genus Sulcoclymenia Schindewolf, 1923
    - Family Platyclymeniidae Wedekind, 1914
      - Subfamily Nodosoclymeniinae Korn, 2002
        - Genus Czarnoclymenia Korn, 1999
        - Genus Nodosoclymenia Czarnocki, 1989
        - Genus Stenoclymenia Lange, 1929
      - Subfamily Platyclymeniinae Wedekind, 1914
        - Genus Fasciclymenia Korn and Price, 1987
        - Genus Platyclymenia Sepkoski, Jr., 2002
        - Genus Progonioclymenia Schindewolf, 1937
        - Genus Spinoclymenia Bogoslovsky, 1962
        - Genus Trigonoclymenia Schindewolf, 1934
        - Genus Varioclymenia Wedekind, 1908
      - Subfamily Pleuroclymeniinae Korn, 2002
        - Genus Borisiclymenia Korn, 2002
        - Genus Nanoclymenia Korn, 2002
        - Genus Pleuroclymenia Schindewolf, 1934
        - Genus Trochoclymenia Schindewolf, 1926
  - Superfamily Wocklumeriaceae Schindewolf, 1937
    - Family Parawocklumeriidae Schindewolf, 1937
      - Genus Kamptoclymenia Schindewolf, 1937
      - Genus Parawocklumeria Schindewolf, 1926
      - Genus Tardewocklumeria Becker, 2000
      - Genus Triaclymenia Schindewolf, 1937
    - Family Wocklumeriidae Schindewolf, 1937
      - Genus Epiwocklumeria Schindewolf, 1937
      - Genus Kielcensia Czarnocki, 1989
      - Genus Synwocklumeria Librovitch, 1957
      - Genus Wocklumeria Wedekind, 1918
- Suborder Cyrtoclymeniina Korn, 2002
  - Superfamily Biloclymeniaceae Bogoslovsky, 1955
    - Family Biloclymeniidae Bogoslovsky, 1955
      - Genus Biloclymenia Schindewolf, 1923
      - Genus Dimeroclymenia Czarnocki, 1989
      - Genus Kiaclymenia Bogoslovsky, 1965
      - Genus Rhiphaeoclymenia Bogoslovsky, 1965
    - Family Pachyclymeniidae Korn, 1992
      - Genus Pachyclymenia Schindewolf, 1937
      - Genus Uraloclymenia Bogoslovsky, 1977
  - Superfamily Cyrtoclymeniaceae Hyatt, 1884
    - Family Carinoclymeniidae Bogoslovsky, 1975
      - Genus Acriclymenia Bogoslovsky, 1975
      - Genus Carinoclymenia Bogoslovsky, 1965
      - Genus Karaclymenia Bogoslovsky, 1983
      - Genus Pinacoclymenia Bogoslovsky, 1975
    - Family Cymaclymeniidae Hyatt 1884
      - Subfamily Cymaclymeniinae Hyatt, 1884
        - Genus Cymaclymenia Sepkoski, Jr., 2002
        - Genus Laganoclymenia Bogoslovsky, 1979
        - Genus Procymaclymenia Korn, 2002
        - Genus Rodachia Korn, 2002
      - Subfamily Genuclymeniinae Korn, 2002
        - Genus Flexiclymenia Czarnocki, 1989
        - Genus Genuclymenia Wedekind, 1908
        - Genus Siekluckia Czarnocki, 1989
    - Family Cyrtoclymeniidae Hyatt, 1884
      - Genus Cyrtoclymenia Sepkoski, Jr., 2002
      - Genus Hexaclymenia Schindewolf, 1923
      - Genus Praeflexiclymenia Czarnocki, 1989
      - Genus Pricella Korn, 1991
      - Genus Protactoclymenia Wedekind, 1908
    - Family Rectoclymeniidae Schindewolf, 1923
      - Genus Cteroclymenia Bogoslovsky, 1979
      - Genus Falciclymenia Schindewolf, 1923
      - Genus Karadzharia Korn, 2002
      - Genus Rectoclymenia Wedekind, 1908
- Suborder Incertae sedis
  - Genus Borkinia
  - Genus Gyroclymenia
  - Genus Kazakhoclymenia
  - Genus Miroclymenia
  - Genus Schizoclymenia
