= Phenacoceratidae =

Scientific classification
- Kingdom: Animalia
- Phylum: Mollusca
- Class: Cephalopoda
- Subclass: †Ammonoidea
- Order: †Goniatitida
- Superfamily: †Dimeroceratoidea
- Family: †Phenacoceratidae; Wedekind, 1918

Genera
- †Clymenoceras; †Cycloclymenia

Synonyms
- Clymenoceratidae; Phenacoceratinae

Extinct family of molluscs

Phenacoceratidae is one of three families of the superfamily Dimeroceratoidea. The family is placed in the order Goniatitida, and was first named by Rudolf Wedekind in 1918 who treated the group as a subfamily. The family was named for Phenacoceras, a junior synonym of Clymenoceras. They are an extinct group of ammonoids, which are shelled cephalopods related to squids, belemnites, octopodes, and cuttlefish, and more distantly to the nautiloids. They were fast-moving free-swimming (nektonic) carnivores.

== Genera ==
Two genera are currently placed in Phenacoceratidae:

- Clymenoceras Schindewolf, 1938
  - Cl. insolitum Schindewolf, 1938
- Cycloclymenia Hyatt, 1884 (synonyms Balvites Wedekind, 1914, Phenacoceras Frech, 1897)
  - Cy. buchi Wedekind, 1914
  - Cy. clymenioides Schindewolf, 1923
  - Cy. planorbiformis Münster, 1832
