= Acriclymenia =

Scientific classification
- Domain: Eukaryota
- Kingdom: Animalia
- Phylum: Mollusca
- Class: Cephalopoda
- Subclass: †Ammonoidea
- Order: †Clymeniida
- Family: †Carinoclymeniidae
- Genus: †Acriclymenia; Bogoslovsky, 1975

Genus of molluscs (fossil)

Acriclymenia was a genus of ammonites that existed during the Devonian period.
