= Rhiphaeoclymenia =

Rhiphaeoclymenia Temporal range: 364.7–360.7 Ma

Scientific classification
- Domain: Eukaryota
- Kingdom: Animalia
- Phylum: Mollusca
- Class: Cephalopoda
- Subclass: †Ammonoidea
- Order: †Clymeniida
- Family: †Biloclymeniidae
- Genus: †Rhiphaeoclymenia; Bogoslovsky, 1965

Genus of molluscs (fossil)

Rhiphaeoclymenia was an extinct genus of ammonites that existed during the Devonian.
