= Pachyclymenia =

Pachyclymenia Temporal range: 364.7–360.7 Ma

Scientific classification
- Domain: Eukaryota
- Kingdom: Animalia
- Phylum: Mollusca
- Class: Cephalopoda
- Subclass: †Ammonoidea
- Order: †Clymeniida
- Family: †Pachyclymeniidae
- Genus: †Pachyclymenia; Schindewolf, 1937

Genus of molluscs (fossil)

Pachyclymenia was an extinct genus of ammonites that existed during the Devonian.
