= Aktuboclymenia =

Scientific classification
- Domain: Eukaryota
- Kingdom: Animalia
- Phylum: Mollusca
- Class: Cephalopoda
- Subclass: †Ammonoidea
- Order: †Clymeniida
- Family: †Clymeniidae
- Genus: †Aktuboclymenia; Bogoslovsky, 1979

Genus of molluscs (fossil)

Aktuboclymenia is an extinct genus of ammonites that existed during the Devonian.
