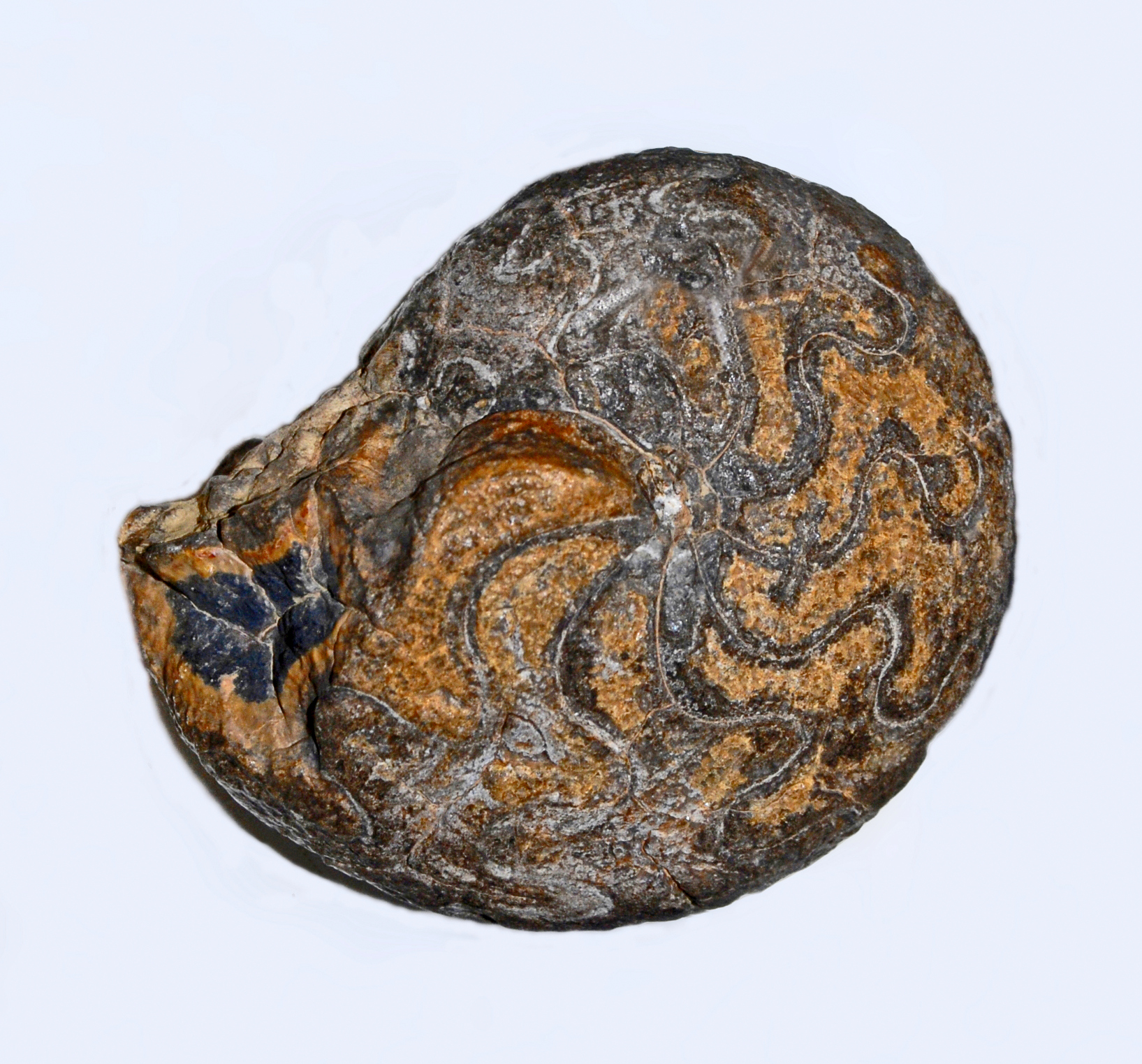
- Fossil of Platyclymenia from Erfoud (Morocco)

Scientific classification
- Kingdom: Animalia
- Phylum: Mollusca
- Class: Cephalopoda
- Subclass: †Ammonoidea
- Order: †Clymeniida
- Family: †Platyclymeniidae; Wedekind, 1914

= Platyclymeniidae =

Platyclymeniidae Temporal range: Famennian

Extinct family of molluscs

Platyclymeniidae is a family of ammonites belonging to the order Clymeniida.

These fast-moving nektonic carnivores lived in the Devonian period, Famennian stage (364.7 to 360.7 Ma).

== Subfamilies and genera ==
Subfamilies and genera within the family Platyclymeniidae include:

- Subfamily Nodosoclymeniinae Korn, 2002
  - Genus Czarnoclymenia Korn, 1999
  - Genus Nodosoclymenia Czarnocki, 1989
  - Genus Stenoclymenia Lange, 1929
- Subfamily Platyclymeniinae Wedekind, 1914
  - Genus Fasciclymenia Korn and Price, 1987
  - Genus Platyclymenia Sepkoski Jr., 2002
  - Genus Progonioclymenia Schindewolf, 1937
  - Genus Spinoclymenia Bogoslovsky, 1962
  - Genus Trigonoclymenia Schindewolf, 1934
  - Genus Varioclymenia Wedekind, 1908
- Subfamily Pleuroclymeniinae Korn, 2002
  - Genus Borisiclymenia Korn, 2002
  - Genus Nanoclymenia Korn, 2002
  - Genus Pleuroclymenia Schindewolf, 1934
  - Genus Trochoclymenia Schindewolf, 1926

== Distribution ==
Fossils of species within this genus have been found in the Devonian sediments of Australia, China, Morocco, Poland and United States.
