= Karaclymenia =

Karaclymenia Temporal range: 370.6–364.7 Ma

Scientific classification
- Domain: Eukaryota
- Kingdom: Animalia
- Phylum: Mollusca
- Class: Cephalopoda
- Subclass: †Ammonoidea
- Order: †Clymeniida
- Family: †Carinoclymeniidae
- Genus: †Karaclymenia; Bogoslovsky, 1983

Genus of molluscs (fossil)

Karaclymenia was a genus of ammonites that existed during the Devonian.
