= Biloclymenia =

Biloclymenia Temporal range: Famennian

Scientific classification
- Kingdom: Animalia
- Phylum: Mollusca
- Class: Cephalopoda
- Subclass: †Ammonoidea
- Order: †Clymeniida
- Family: †Biloclymeniidae
- Genus: †Biloclymenia; Schindewolf, 1923

Species
- B. aktubensis; B. australis; B. bilobata; B. dubia; B. nebulosa

Genus of molluscs (fossil)

Biloclymenia is a genus in the ammonoid order Clymeniida which is characterized by a dorsal retrosiphonitic siphuncle with long adapically pointing septal necks.

The shell of shell Biloclymenia is thickly discoidal, more or less involute, with a moderately wide umbilicus, lightly thickened sides and rounded venter. The shell is surface smooth, covered merely by growth lines which form two salients. The ventral lobe of the suture is wide and divided in two with a secondary lobe at the top of median saddle. Additional sutural elements are two umbilical, an inner lateral and a dorsal lobe.

The Treatise on Invertebrate Paleontology (Part L 1957) includes Biloclymenia in the Wocklumariidae which is derived from Hexaclymeniidae. Saunders et al(1999) expands upon this theme and puts Bilocymenia and Biloclymeniidae in the Sellaclymeniaceae (suborder Gonioclymeniina), indicates the following phylogenetic progression beginning with Hexaclymenia. Hexaclymenia (Hexaclymeniidae) → Uraloclymenia (Miroclymeniidae) → Kiaclymenia (Biloclymeniidae) → Bioloclymenia.
