= Uraloclymenia =

Uraloclymenia Temporal range: Famennian

Scientific classification
- Domain: Eukaryota
- Kingdom: Animalia
- Phylum: Mollusca
- Class: Cephalopoda
- Subclass: †Ammonoidea
- Order: †Clymeniida
- Family: †Pachyclymeniidae
- Genus: †Uraloclymenia; Bogoslovskii, 1977

Genus of molluscs (fossil)

Uraloclymenia is an extinct ammonoid cephalopod genus from the Late Devonian, Famennian stage. The type species is Uraloclymenia volkovi Bogoslovskii, 1977

The shell of Uranloclymenia is lenticular, with a narrow umbilicus and usually free of ribs. Constrictions are absent. The suture has a very broad, shallow ventral lobe, a shallowly rounded lateral lobe, an inconspicuous umbilical lobe inside the umbilical seam, and an internal lobe on the dorsum. As for all clymeniids, the siphuncle is along the dorsum.
