= Cyrtoclymeniina =

Cyrtoclymeniina Temporal range: 364.7–360.7 Ma

Scientific classification
- Domain: Eukaryota
- Kingdom: Animalia
- Phylum: Mollusca
- Class: Cephalopoda
- Subclass: †Ammonoidea
- Order: †Clymeniida
- Suborder: †Cyrtoclymeniina; Korn, 2002

Superfamilies
- †Biloclymeniaceae; †Cyrtoclymeniaceae

Extinct suborder of ammonites

Cyrtoclymeniina was an extinct suborder of ammonites that existed during the Devonian.
