= Biloclymeniidae =

Biloclymeniidae Temporal range: 364.7–360.7 Ma

Scientific classification
- Domain: Eukaryota
- Kingdom: Animalia
- Phylum: Mollusca
- Class: Cephalopoda
- Subclass: †Ammonoidea
- Order: †Clymeniida
- Superfamily: †Biloclymenioidea
- Family: †Biloclymeniidae; Bogoslovsky, 1955

Genera
- †Biloclymenia; †Dimeroclymenia; †Kiaclymenia; †Rhiphaeoclymenia

Extinct family of ammonites

Biloclymeniidae was an extinct family of ammonites that existed during the Devonian.
