= Clymeniina =

Scientific classification
- Kingdom: Animalia
- Phylum: Mollusca
- Class: Cephalopoda
- Subclass: †Ammonoidea
- Order: †Clymeniida
- Suborder: †Clymeniina; Hyatt, 1884

Superfamilies
- †Clymeniaceae; †Gonioclymeniaceae; †Platyclymeniaceae; †Wocklumeriaceae

Extinct suborder of ammonites

Clymeniina is an extinct suborder of ammonites that existed during the Devonian.
