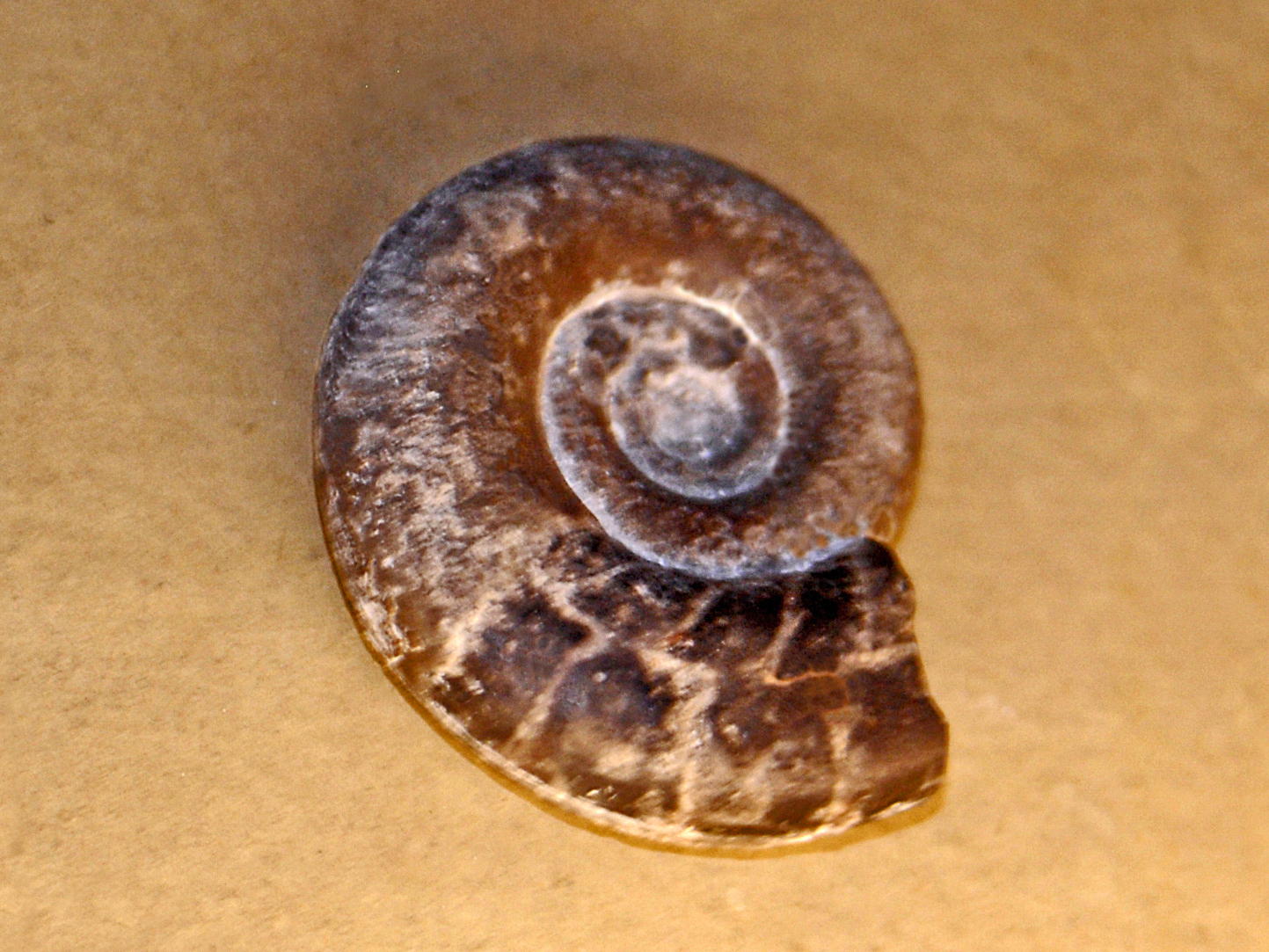
- Fossil shell of Clymenia laevigata, on display at Galerie de paléontologie et d'anatomie comparée, Paris

Scientific classification
- Kingdom: Animalia
- Phylum: Mollusca
- Class: Cephalopoda
- Subclass: †Ammonoidea
- Order: †Clymeniida
- Superfamily: †Clymeniaceae
- Family: †Clymeniidae; Edwards 1849

= Clymeniidae =

Clymeniidae Temporal range: Devonian, 364.7–360.7 Ma

Family of molluscs

Clymeniidae is a family in the ammonoid order Clymeniida. It is characterized by a dorsal siphuncle that runs along the inside of the whorls, unusual for ammonoids.

== Genera ==
- Aktuboclymenia Bogoslovsky 1979
- Clymenia Münster, 1834

== Distribution ==
Fossils of species within this family have been found in the Devonian of Australia.
