= Raymondiceras =

Raymondiceras Temporal range: Famennian

Scientific classification
- Kingdom: Animalia
- Phylum: Mollusca
- Class: Cephalopoda
- Subclass: †Ammonoidea
- Order: †Goniatitida
- Family: †Cheiloceratidae
- Subfamily: †Raymondiceratinae
- Genus: †Raymondiceras; Schindewolf, 1934

Genus of molluscs (fossil)

Raymondiceras is genus of ammonoid cephalopod belonging to the Cheiloceratidae family. Species belonging to this genus lived in late Devonian (Famennian).

== Species and distribution ==
- Raymondiceras inceptum Petersen, 1975: ca 367.6 - 366.9 mya of Western Australia
- Raymondiceras simplex Raymond, 1909: ca 370.0 - 366.8 mya of Montana (USA). This species has been originally assigned to genus Prolobites. This is type species for genus Raymondiceras.
