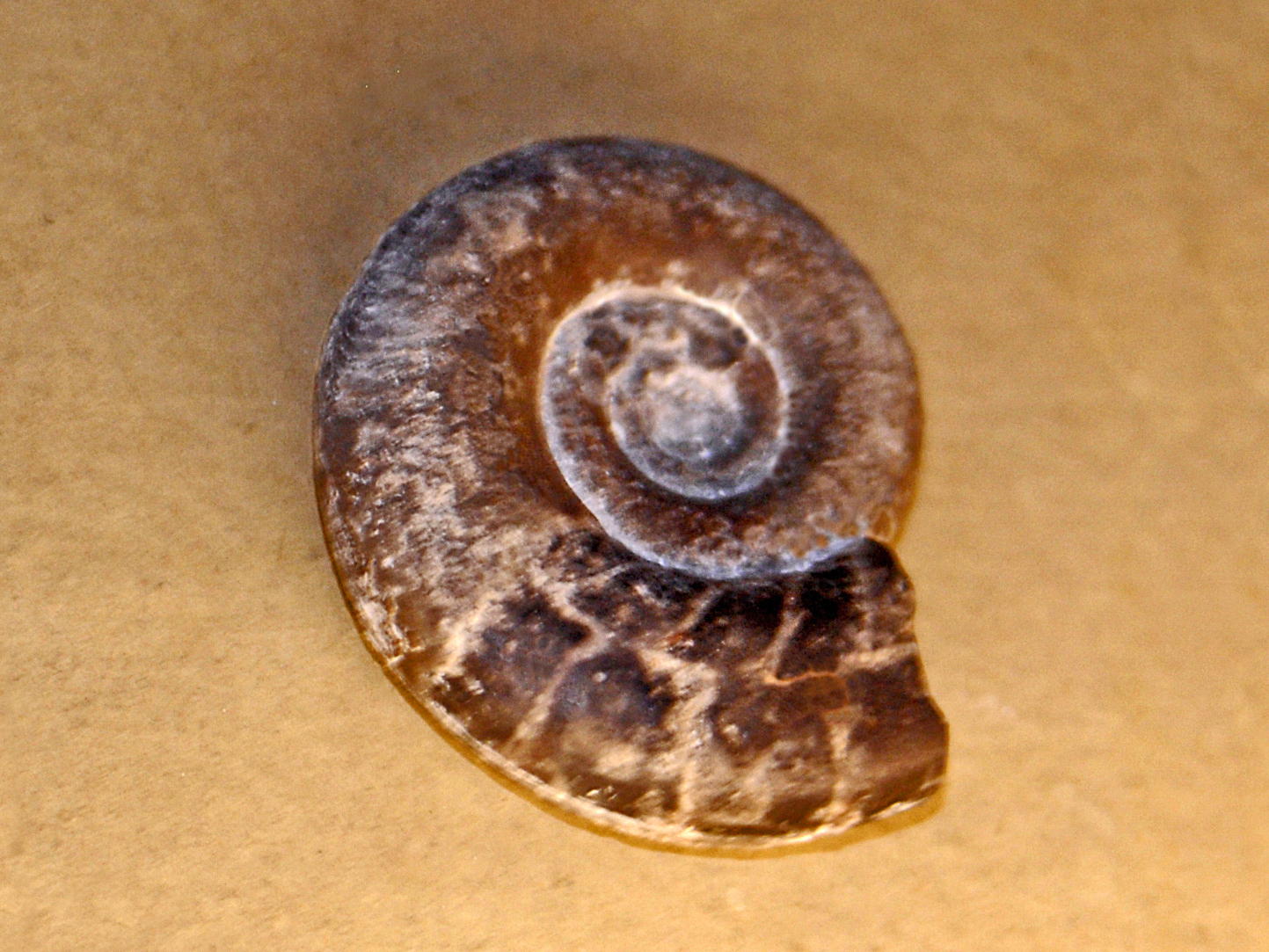
- Fossil shell of Clymenia laevigata, on display at Galerie de paléontologie et d'anatomie comparée, Paris

Scientific classification
- Kingdom: Animalia
- Phylum: Mollusca
- Class: Cephalopoda
- Subclass: †Ammonoidea
- Order: †Clymeniida
- Family: †Clymeniidae
- Genus: †Clymenia; Swingle, 1939

Species
- C. laevigata; C. sedgwickii

= Clymenia (ammonite) =

Clymenia Temporal range: Famennian

Genus of molluscs (fossil)

Clymenia is a genus in the ammonoid order Clymeniida, restricted to the Upper Devonian, characterized as with all clymeniids by a dorsal siphuncle that runs along the inside of the whorls, unusual for ammonoids.

Clymenia has a closely coiled evolute shell that may be faintly ribbed. The dorsum, on the inside of the whorl, is slightly impressed, a result of the outermost whorl slightly enveloping the previous. The venter may be rounded or acute. The suture is simple, with a broad ventral saddle, broad lateral lobe, a dorso-lateral saddle, and a moderately deep hidden dorsal lobe. Septal necks are usually short and do not form a continuous tube. The suture and siphuncle are characteristic of the family.

Clymenia is type genus of the family Clymeniidae. Its fossils have been found in Europe and Western Australia.
