= Carinoclymeniidae =

Carinoclymeniidae Temporal range: 382.7–358.9 Ma

Scientific classification
- Domain: Eukaryota
- Kingdom: Animalia
- Phylum: Mollusca
- Class: Cephalopoda
- Subclass: †Ammonoidea
- Order: †Clymeniida
- Family: †Carinoclymeniidae; Bogoslovsky, 1975

Genera
- †Acriclymenia; †Carinoclymenia; †Karaclymenia; †Pinacoclymenia

Extinct family of ammonites

Carinoclymeniidae was a family of ammonites that existed during the Devonian.
