= Nelomites =

Nelomites Temporal range: Famennian

Scientific classification
- Kingdom: Animalia
- Phylum: Mollusca
- Class: Cephalopoda
- Subclass: †Ammonoidea
- Order: †Goniatitida
- Family: †Cheiloceratidae
- Subfamily: †Raymondiceratinae
- Genus: †Nelomites; Bockwinkel, Korn & Herd, 2019

Nelomites is genus of ammonoid cephalopods belonging to the Cheiloceratidae family. Species belonging to this genus lived in late Devonian (Famennian). This genus was originally described under the name Melonites Bogoslovskii, 1971; however, the same generic name has also been used for genus of echinoid named Melonites Norwood & Owen, 1846. Bockwinkel, Korn & Herd (2019) coined a replacement generic name Nelomites.

== Species and distribution ==
- Melonites globosus Bogoslovskii, 1971: ca 370.0 - 366.8 mya of Kazakhstan (South Urals). This is actually only member of this genus.

Sometimes, more species were added into this genus:

- Melonites insulcatus ?= Prolobites? insulcatus
- Melonites multisulcatus ?= Prolobites multisulcatus
