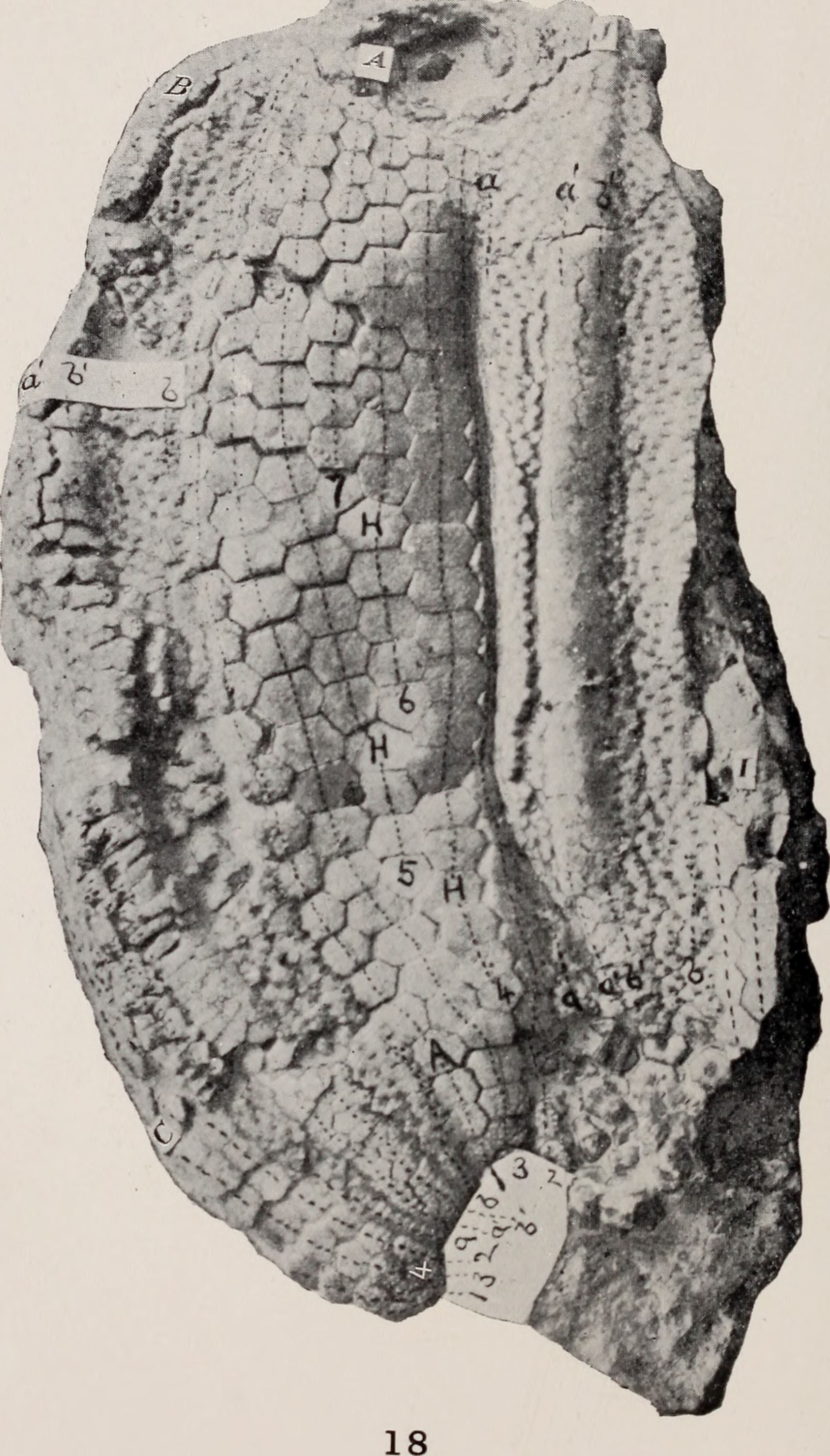
- Melonites multiporus fossil from St Louis, Missouri

Scientific classification
- Kingdom: Animalia
- Phylum: Echinodermata
- Class: Echinoidea
- Order: Palaechinoidea
- Family: Palaechinidae
- Genus: Melonites Norwood & Owen, 1846

= Melonites (echinoderm) =

Melonites Temporal range:

Extinct genus of sea urchins

Melonites is an extinct genus of sea urchin from the family Palaechinidae. Species belonging to this genus lived during the late Mississippian (Meramecian).

The same generic name was used for a genus of goniatite, which was later renamed Nelomites.
