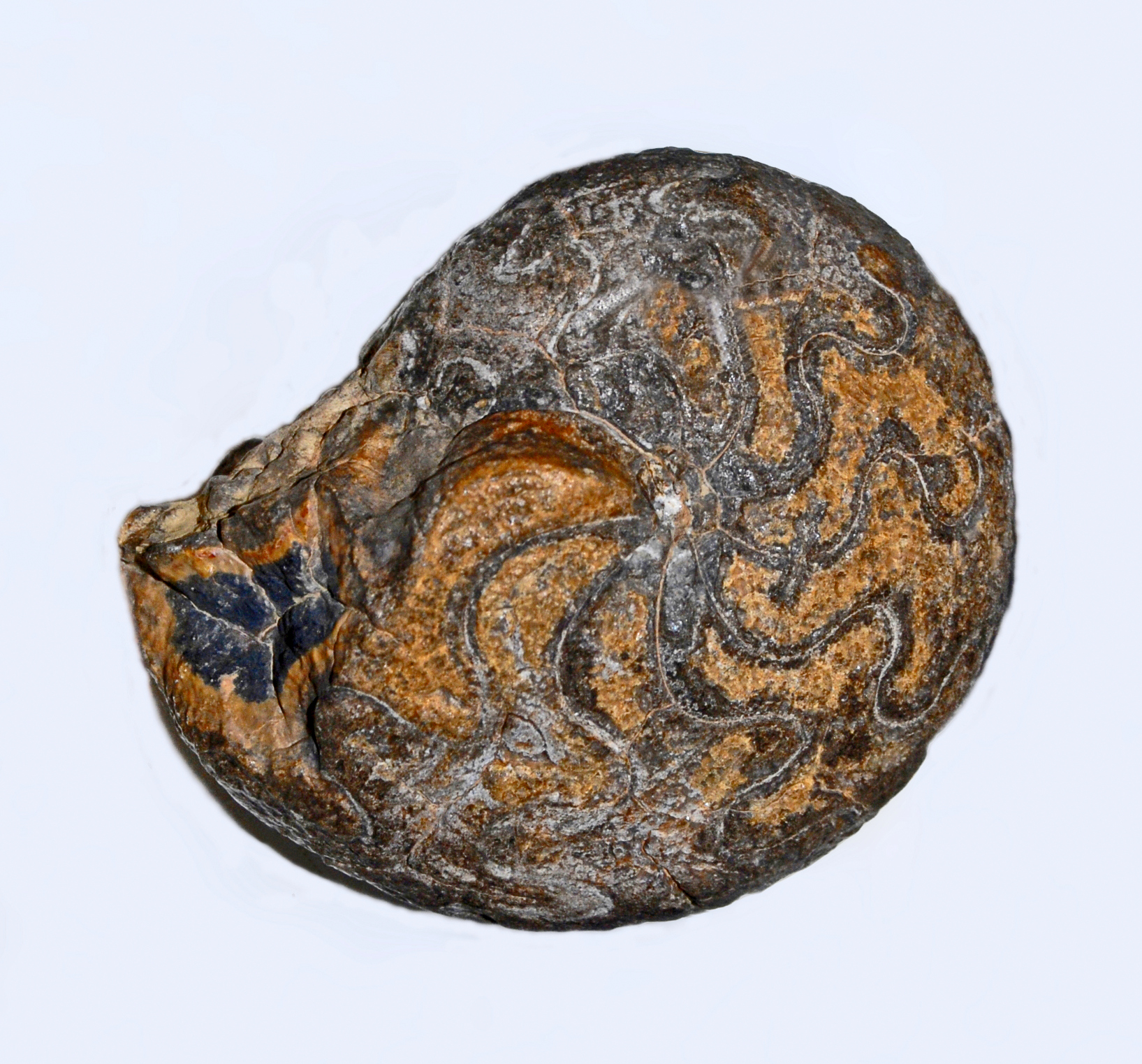
- Fossil of Platyclymenia from Erfoud (Morocco)

Scientific classification
- Kingdom: Animalia
- Phylum: Mollusca
- Class: Cephalopoda
- Subclass: †Ammonoidea
- Order: †Clymeniida
- Family: †Platyclymeniidae
- Genus: †Platyclymenia (Hyatt, 1884)

= Platyclymenia =

Platyclymenia Temporal range: Famennian

Genus of molluscs (fossil)

Platyclymenia is a genus of ammonites belonging to the family Platyclymeniidae.

These fast-moving nektonic carnivores lived in the Devonian period, Famennian stage (364.7 to 360.7 Ma).

== Species ==
Species within the genus Platyclymenia include:

- Platyclymenia alterna Jenkins 1968
- Platyclymenia americana Raymond 1907
- Platyclymenia annulata Munster 1832
- Platyclymenia eurylobica Petersen 1975
- Platyclymenia levata Hartenfels & Becker 2016
- Platyclymenia montana Korn & Titus 2006
- Platyclymenia teicherti Jenkins 1968

== Description ==
Shells of Platyclymenia species can reach a diameter of 0.7–47 millimetres (0.028–1.850 in).

== Distribution ==
Fossils of species within this genus have been found in the Devonian sediments of Australia, China, Morocco, Poland and United States.
