= Cheiloceratidae =

Cheiloceratidae Temporal range: Upper Devonian - Middle Permian

Scientific classification
- Domain: Eukaryota
- Kingdom: Animalia
- Phylum: Mollusca
- Class: Cephalopoda
- Subclass: †Ammonoidea
- Order: †Goniatitida
- Superfamily: †Prionoceratoidea
- Family: †Cheiloceratidae; Frech, 1897

Subfamilies
- Cheiloceratinae; Immatoceratinae; Nehdenitinae; Raymondiceratinae

Extinct family of molluscs

Cheiloceratidae is a family of ammonoid cephalopods included in the goniatitid suborder Tornoceratina in which the suture has 4 to 12 lobes, the ventral one undivided and those in the lateral areas originating as subdivisions of internal and external lateral saddles.

== Taxonomy ==
The taxonomy of the Cheiloceratidae varies according to the perception of different researchers over time and can be considered a work in progress. That presented in the taxobox is simply one of the more recent.

Cheiloceratidae is the larger of two families included in the Cheilocerataceae in the 1957 Treatise Part L, the other being the Tornoceratidae. The Cheiloceratidae (M, F, & S) range from the Upper Devonian to the Middle Permian and includes 4 subfamilies. Cheiloceratinae is essentially the Cheiloceratidae of Saunders et al. but includes Dimeroceras, the basis for the Dimeroceratidae and ultimately the Dimeroceratoidea. The other three are Raymondiceratinae, Sporadoceratinae, and Immatoceratinae. Immatoceratinae includes Prionoceras, the basis for the Prionocerataceae of Korn (2006).

The Russian Osnovy Paleontologii, by Bogoslovsky et al, placed the Cheiloceratidae, in the sense of the Cheiloceratinae of the Treatise, in the superfamily Dimeroceratoidea (ex Dimerocerataceae) which is included in the suborder Tornoceratina. Sister families to the Cheiloceratidae in the Dimeroceratoidea are the Dimeroceratidae, Phenacoceratidae, Prolobitidae, and Sinotitidae.

Saunders et al includes the Cheiloceratidae in the suborder Tornoceratina along with the Maenioceratidae, Tornoceratidae, Sinotitidae, Posttornoceratidae, Sporadoceratidae, and Dimeroceratidae; without the use of a superfamily.

In the more recent taxonomy attributed to Dieter Korn in 2006 the Cheiloceratidae is included in the Prionocerataceae and includes two subfamilies, the Cheiloceratinae and Nehdenitinae.
