= Burmese amber =

Late Cretaceous amber from Northern Myanmar

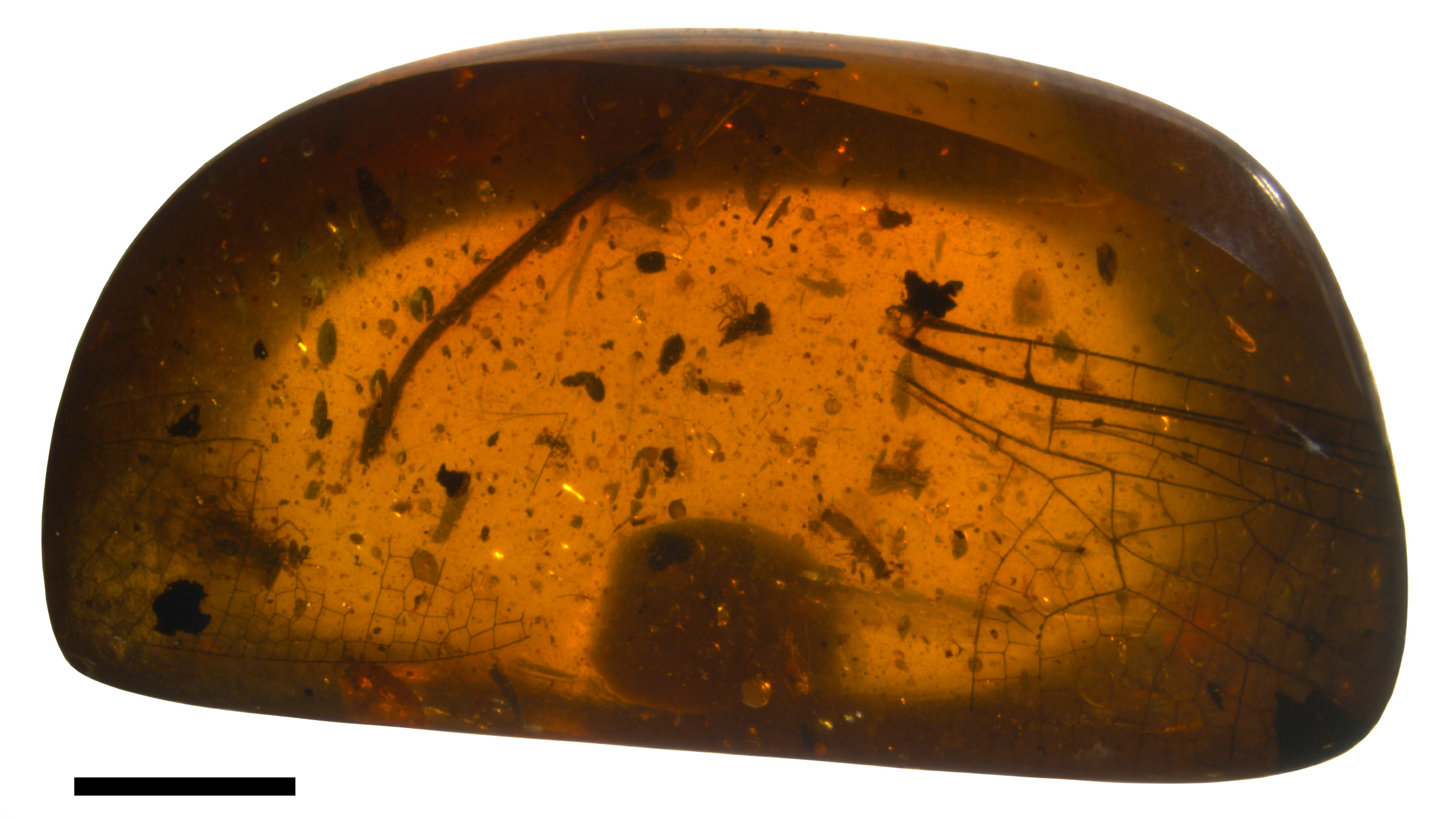
Wing of the dragonfly Burmalindenia in a cabochon of Burmese amber, showing typical red colouration of the amber. Scale bar = 5 mm

Burmese amber, also known as Burmite or Kachin amber, is a type of amber from the Hukawng Valley in northern Myanmar. The amber is dated to around 100 million years ago, during the latest Albian to earliest Cenomanian ages of the mid-Cretaceous period. The amber is of significant palaeontological interest due to the diversity of flora and fauna contained as inclusions, particularly arthropods including insects and arachnids but also birds, lizards, snakes, frogs and fragmentary dinosaur remains. The amber has been known and commercially exploited since the first century AD, and has been known to science since the mid-nineteenth century. Research on the deposit has attracted controversy due to the potential role of the amber trade in funding internal conflict in Myanmar and hazardous working conditions in the mines where it is collected.

== Geological context and age ==
Video showing paleogeographic reconstructions from Advokaat and van Hinsbergen 2024, demonstrating the proposed rifting of the West Burma terrane off of Australia during the Jurassic and its subsequent movement northward and collision with India and Asia during the Cenozoic

The amber is found in the Hukawng Basin, a large Cretaceous-Cenozoic sedimentary basin within northern Myanmar. The strata have undergone folding and faulting. The Hukawng basin is part of the larger Myanmar Central Basin, a N-S orientated synclinal basin extending to the Gulf of Martaban to the south. The basin is considered to be a part of the West Burma block (a.k.a. Burma terrane), which has a debated tectonic history. Like the Cimmeria and Sibumasu terranes, it is thought to have originally rifted from Gondwana before later being accreted onto the Asian continental margin. The block was part of Gondwana during at least the Early Paleozoic, but the timing of rifting was historically very uncertain, with estimates ranging from the Devonian to Early Cretaceous, with it being disputed whether the block had accreted onto the Asian continental margin by the time of the amber deposition. Paleogeographic reconstructions by Westerweel et al (2019, 2025) and Advokaat and van Hinsbergen (2024) have suggested that the Burma terrane separated from what is now the northwest coast of Australia during the Jurassic period and formed an island land mass in the Tethys Ocean during the Mid Cretaceous at a latitude around 5–10 degrees south of the equator, considerably northeast of the combined Insular India (comprising the modern Indian subcontinent)-Madagascar landmass. The precise size, shape and orientation of the Burma Terrane and its tectonic relationships to other landmasses and terranes within the Tethys remains subject to considerable uncertainty.

Some members of the Burmese amber flora and fauna have Gondwanan affinities, while others have Laurasian affinities. It has been suggested that the Burma Terrane may have served as a "biotic ferry" transporting organisms across oceanic barriers dispersing them from Gondwana to Asia, following the suggested collision of the Burma Terrane with Asia during the Cenozoic.

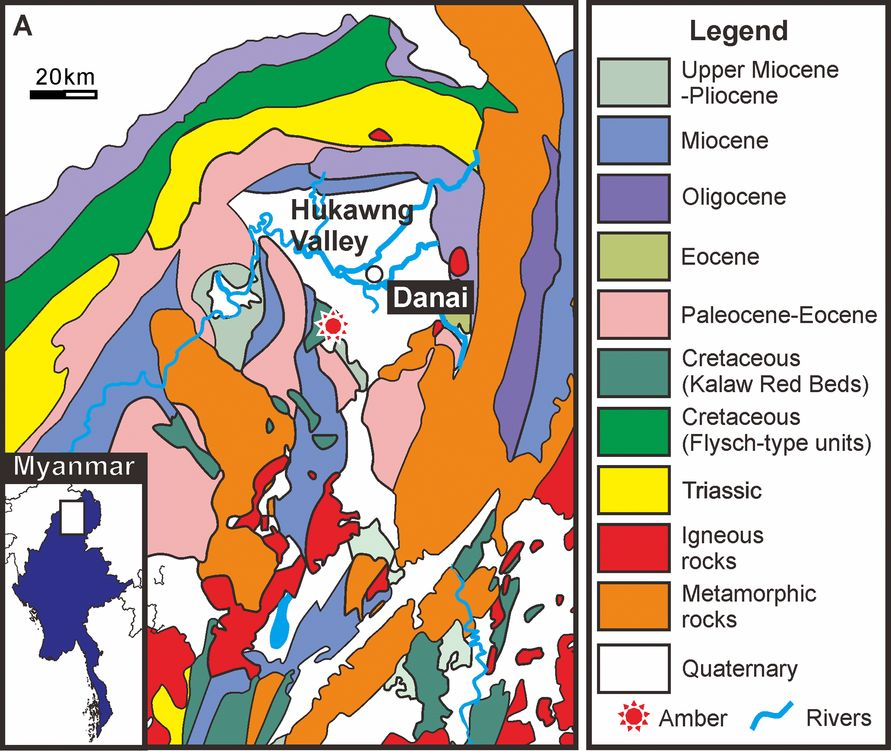
Geological context of Burmese amber in northern Myanmar

At Noije Bum, located on a ridge, amber is found within fine grained clastic rocks, typically medium to greyish green in colour, resulting from the constituent grains being black, yellow, grey and light green. The fine grained rocks are primarily fine to very fine grained sandstone, with beds of silt and shale and laterally persistent thin, around 1–2 millimetres (3/64–5/64 in) thick coal horizons. Massive micritic limestone interbeds 6–8 centimetres (2 23/64–3 5/32 in) thickness, often containing coalified plant material also occur. This facies association is typically around 1 metre (3 ft 3 in) thick and typically thinly bedded and laminated. Associated with the fine grained facies is a set of medium facies primarily consisting of medium to fine grained sandstones also containing thin beds of siltstone, shale and conglomerate, alongside a persistent conglomerate horizon. A specimen of the ammonite Mortoniceras has been found in a sandstone bed 2 metres above the amber horizon, alongside indeterminate gastropods and bivalves. Lead-uranium dating of zircon crystals of volcanic clasts within the amber bearing horizons has given a maximum age of 98.79 ± 0.62 million years ago (Ma), making the deposit earliest Cenomanian in age. Unpublished data by Wang Bo on other layers suggests an age range of deposition of at least 5 million years. The amber does not appear to have undergone significant transport since hardening or be redeposited. The strata at the site are younging upwards (having the typical situation of younger rocks being vertically above older rocks), striking north north-east and dipping 50–70 degrees E and SE north of the ridge and striking between south south-east and south-east and dipping 35–60 degrees south-west south of the ridge, suggesting the site is on the northwest limb of a syncline plunging to the northeast. A minor fault with a conspicuous gouge zone was noted as present, though it appeared to have no significant displacement. Several other localities are known, including the colonial Khanjamaw and the more recent Inzutzut, Angbamo, and Xipiugong sites, within the vicinity of Tanai. The Hkamti site SW of the Hukawng basin has been determined to be significantly older, dating to the early Albian around ca. 110 Ma and is therefore considered distinct.

The amber itself is primarily disc-shaped and flattened along the bedding plane, and is typically reddish brown, with the colour ranging from shades of yellow to red. The opacity of the amber ranges from clear to opaque. Many amber pieces have thin calcite veins that are typically less than 1 mm (3/64 in), but up to 4–5 mm (5/32–13/64 in) thick. The number and proportion of veins in a piece of amber varies significantly, in some pieces veins are virtually absent, while others are described as being "packed with veinlets".

== Paleoenvironment ==
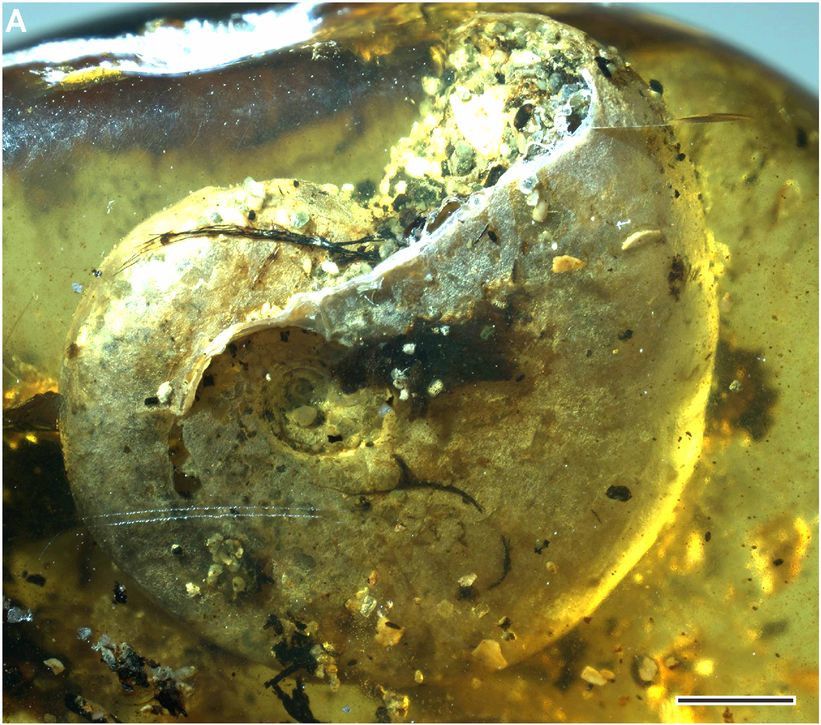
A Puzosia (Bhimaites) species juvenile shell in Burmese amber

The Burmese amber paleoforest is considered to have been a tropical rainforest, situated near the coast, where resin was subsequently transported into a shallow marine environment. The shell of a dead juvenile Puzosia (Bhimaites) ammonite, four marine gastropod shells (including Mathilda) and littoral or supralittoral isopods entombed in a piece of amber with shell sand, along with growth of Isocrinid crinoids, corals and oysters on the surface of some amber pieces indicate marine conditions for final deposition. Additionally pholadid (piddock) bivalve borings into amber specimens along with at least one pholadid which became trapped was interpreted to show that the resin was still fresh and unhardened when it was being moved into the tidal areas. However, the pholadid in question, belonging to the extinct genus Palaeolignopholas, were later interpreted as a freshwater species, and the presence of numerous freshwater insects suggests that the initial environment of deposition was a downstream estuarine to freshwater section of a river, with the forests extending across coastal rivers, river deltas, lakes, lagoons, and coastal bays. The forest environment may have been prone to fire, similar to modern tropical peat swamps, based on the presence of fire adapted plants and burned plant remains found in the amber.

The amber is considered to be of coniferous origin, with a likely araucarian source tree, based on spectroscopic analysis and wood fragment inclusions, though a pine origin has also been suggested.

== Fauna and flora ==
The list of taxa is extraordinarily diverse, with 50 classes (or equivalent), 133 orders (or equivalent), 726 families, 1,757 genera and 2,770 species described as of 2023. The vast majority of the species are arthropods, mostly insects.

=== Arthropods ===
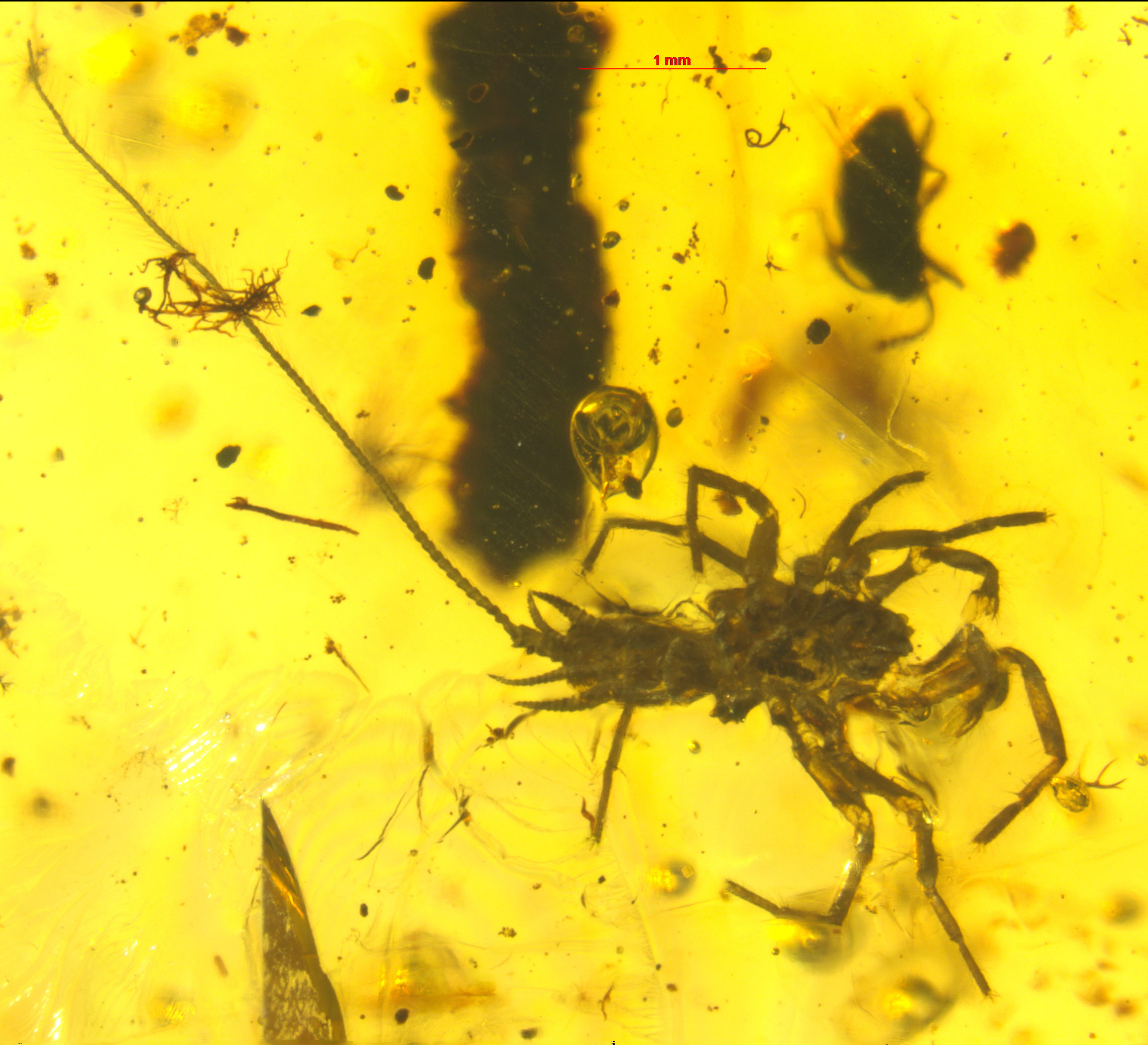
Fossil of the tailed stem-group spider Chimerarachne in Burmese amber

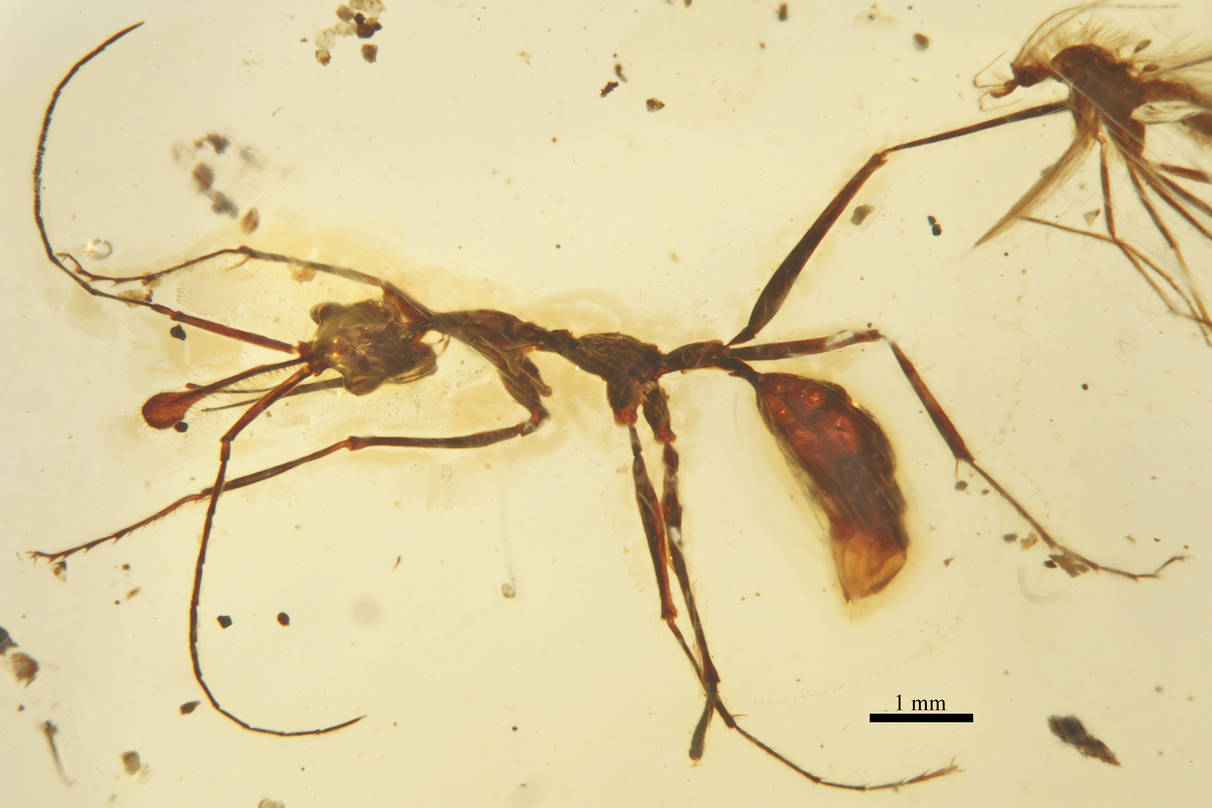
Fossil of Ceratomyrmex a "hell ant" belonging to the extinct ant subfamily Haidomyrmecinae. Members of this subfamily are noted for their unusually shaped jaws

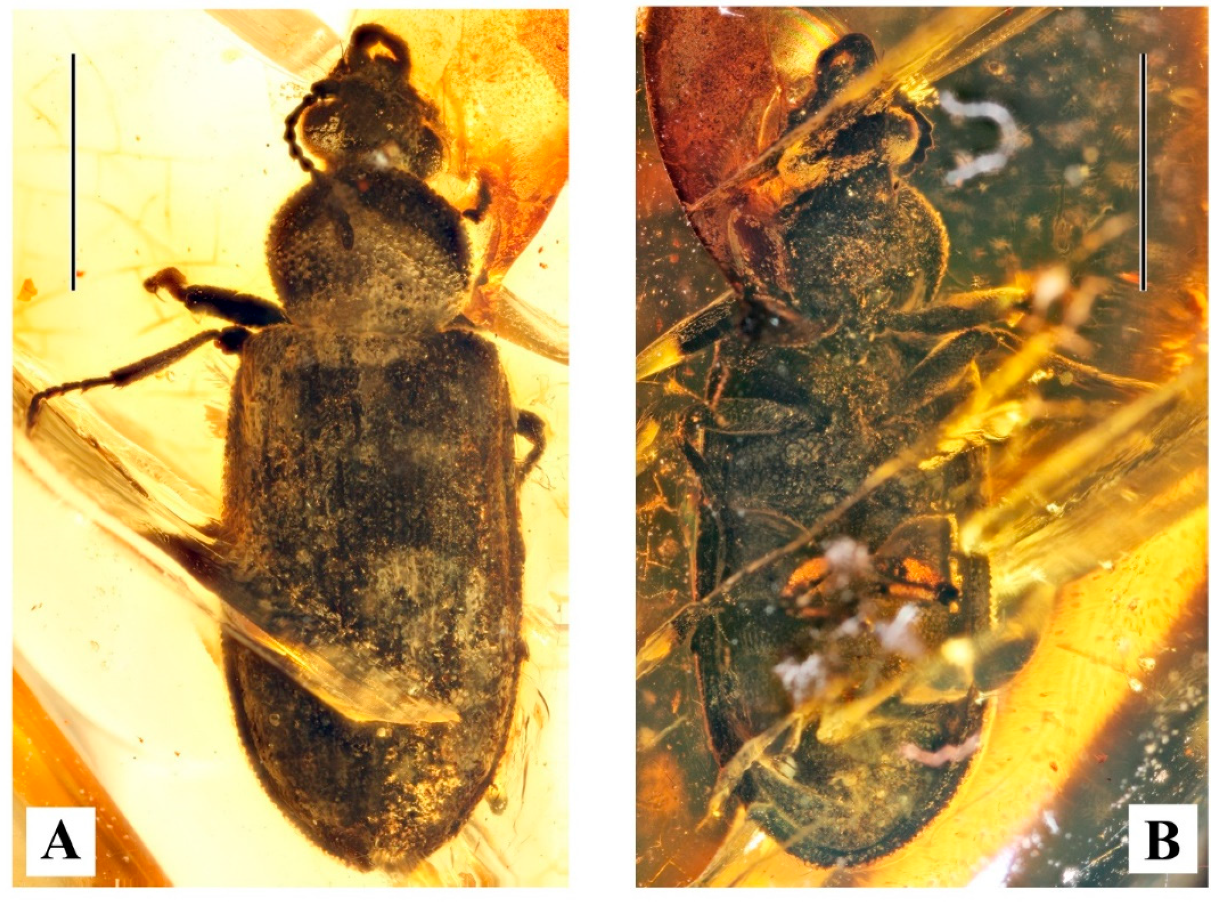
Fossil of Omma janetae. Omma is a living fossil genus with a fossil record spanning around 200 million years

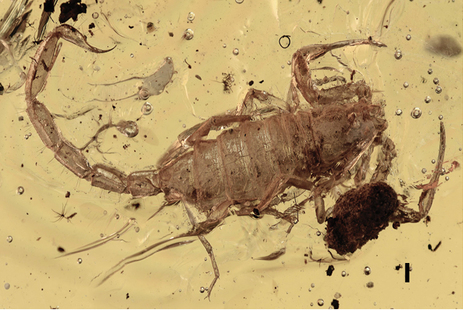
Fossil of the scorpion Betaburmesebuthus (Buthoidea)

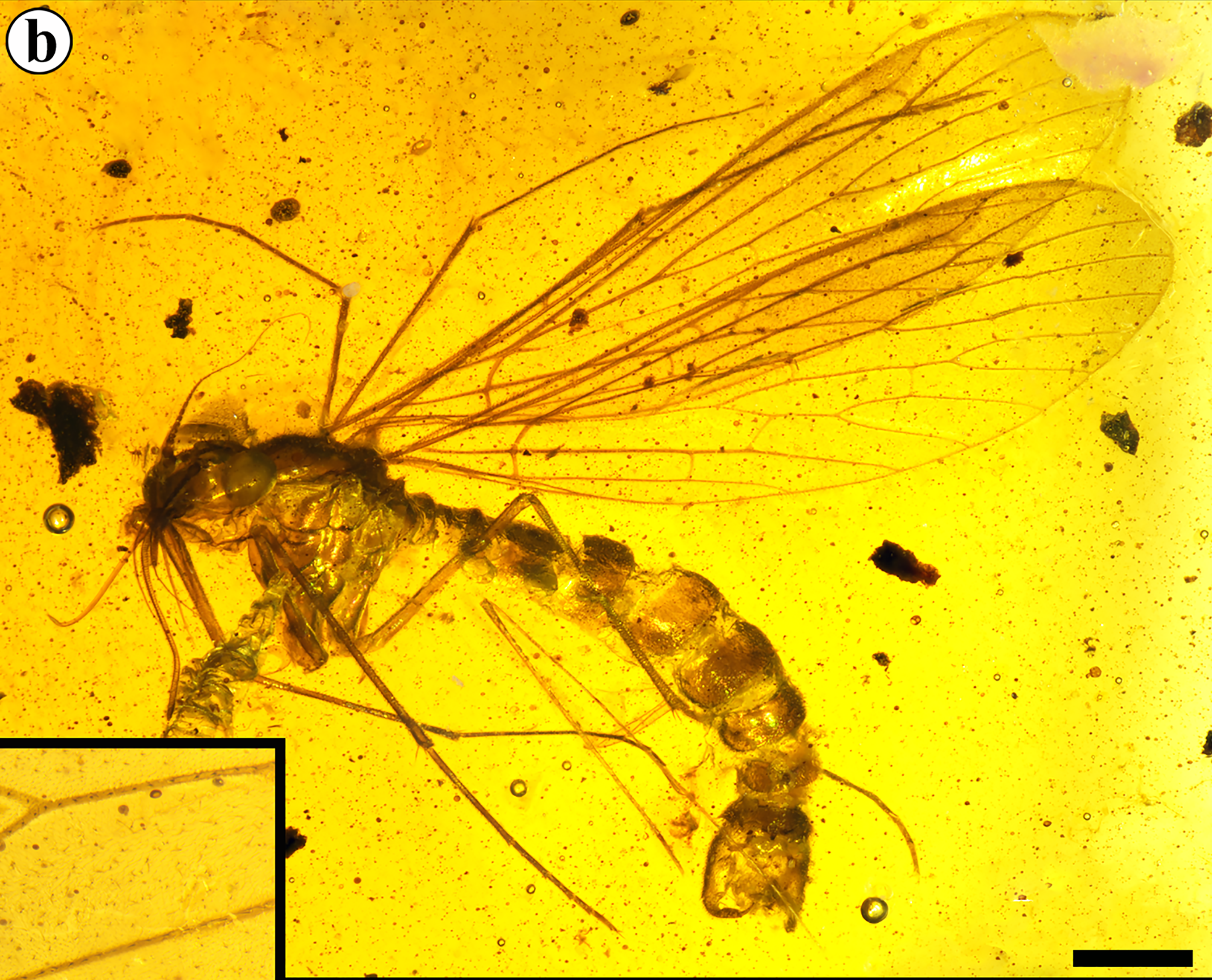
Fossil of Dualula, an extinct mecopteran belonging to the extinct family Pseudopolycentropodidae, which unlike any living mecopteran had a long proboscis for feeding on plant liquids

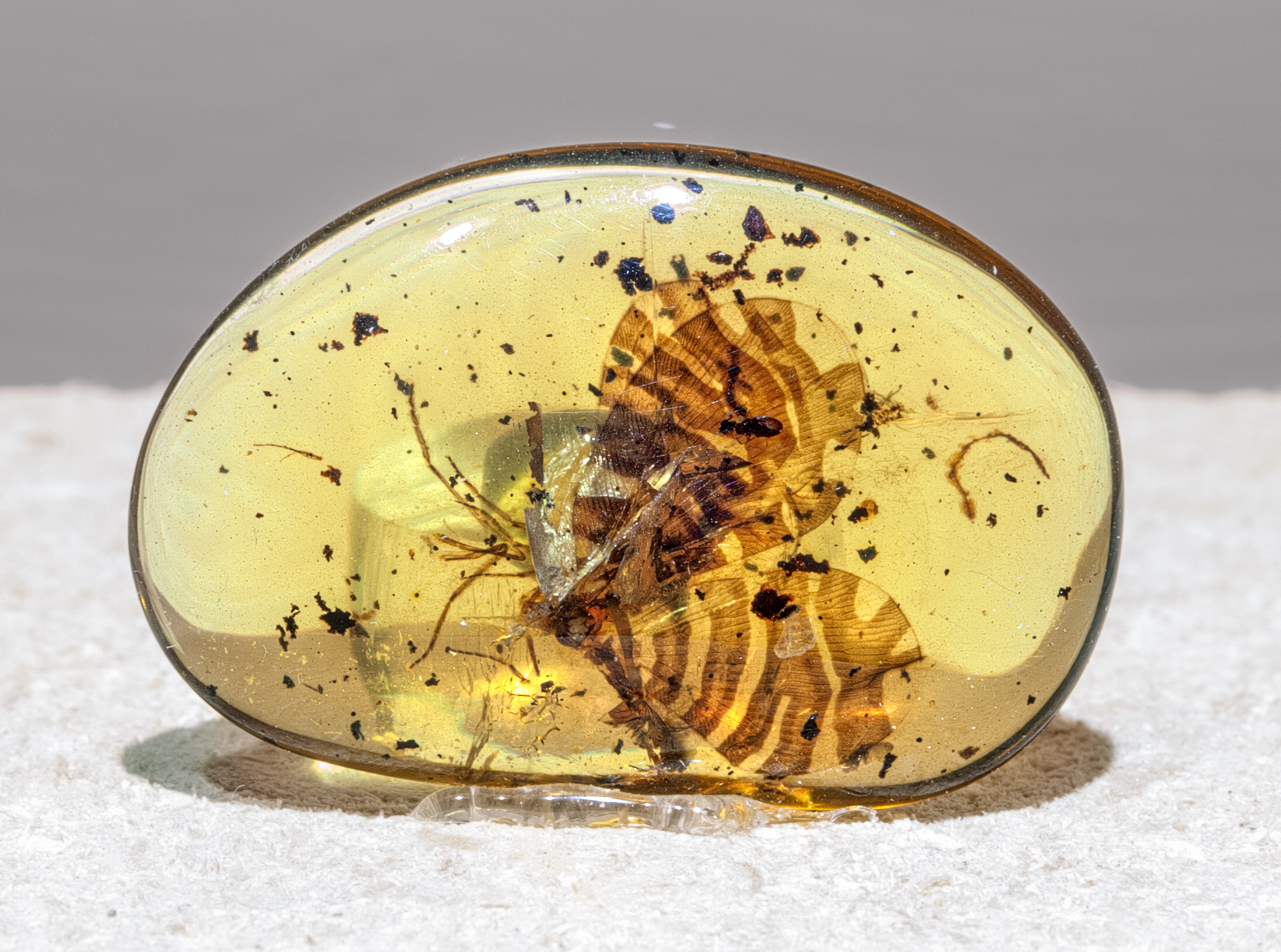
Fossil of a member of the extinct family Kalligrammatidae, which despite their superficially butterfly-like appearance, are members of the lacewing order Neuroptera

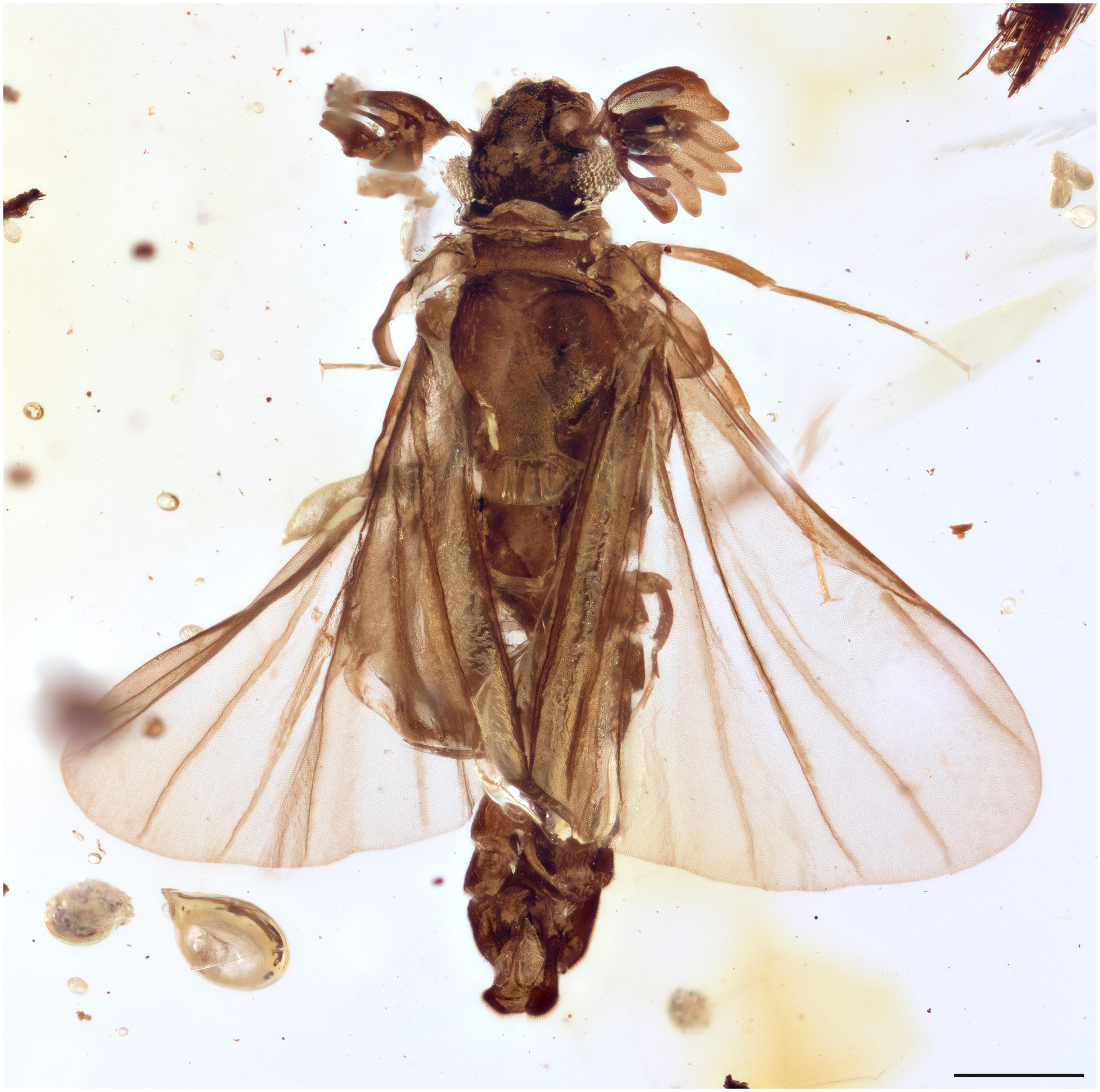
Male of Heterobathmilla, a member of the parasitic insect order Strepsiptera

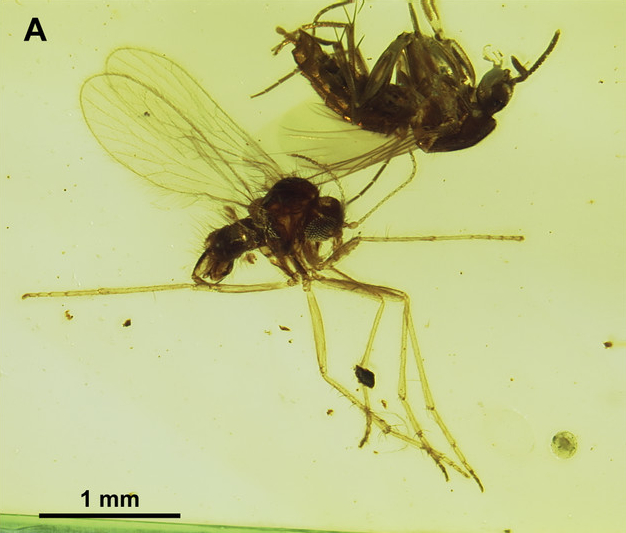
Mandalayia, a member of the drain fly family Psychodidae

Over 2500 species of arthropods (with over 2000 of these species being insects) are known from the deposit, notably including the oldest members of the arachnid orders Palpigradi (Electrokoenenia) and Schizomida and the only known fossil members of Ricinulei since the Paleozoic. Chimerarachne is a unique stem-group spider still possessing a tail, with similar forms only known from the Paleozoic, with over 360 other species of spiders (including the only non Paleozoic fossils of Mesothelae) being known from Burmese amber, along with over 40 species of scorpions. Other significant arachnid fossils include some of the oldest ticks, as well as the oldest mesostigmatan and opilioacarid mites. Beetles (Coleoptera), reflecting their modern diversity, are represented by over 100 families and over 500 species, with Hymenoptera (bees, wasps, ants and sawflies) represented by 70 families and 350 species including some of the oldest known ants. Flies (Diptera) are represented by over 50 families and over 250 species and true bugs (Hemiptera) are represented by over 80 families and over 220 species. Dictyoptera (cockroaches, termites and mantises, among others), are represented by over 100 species in 28 families. Odonata (which contains dragonflies and damselflies, among other extinct groups), is represented by over 19 families and over 40 species, far higher than in other Cretaceous amber deposits. Among the oldest members of the insect order Zoraptera are known from Burmese amber, as well as the oldest parasitic lice and the oldest members of the parasitic insect order Strepsiptera. The winged "grylloblattids" Aristovia and Zygogrylloblatta are transitional between the extinct "Grylloblattodea" and modern wingless Grylloblattidae (ice crawlers). Over a dozen species each of Myriapoda (millipedes and centipedes, among others) and Entognatha (springtails, among others) have also been reported, along with a number of woodlice (representing some of the oldest records of the group) and various aquatic crustaceans, including ostracods, true crabs, penaeid shrimp/prawns, tanaidaceans, and several lineages of non-woodlice isopods.

=== Other invertebrates ===
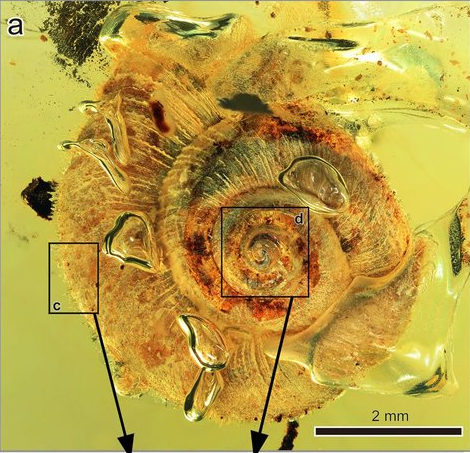
Shell of Archaeocyclotus, a cyclophorid land snail

A wide variety of other invertebrates have been reported. These include gastropods, including freshwater and land snails, the oldest modern onychophoran (velvet worm) Cretoperipatus, as well as nematodes, nematomorphs, annelids and flatworms.

=== Vertebrates ===
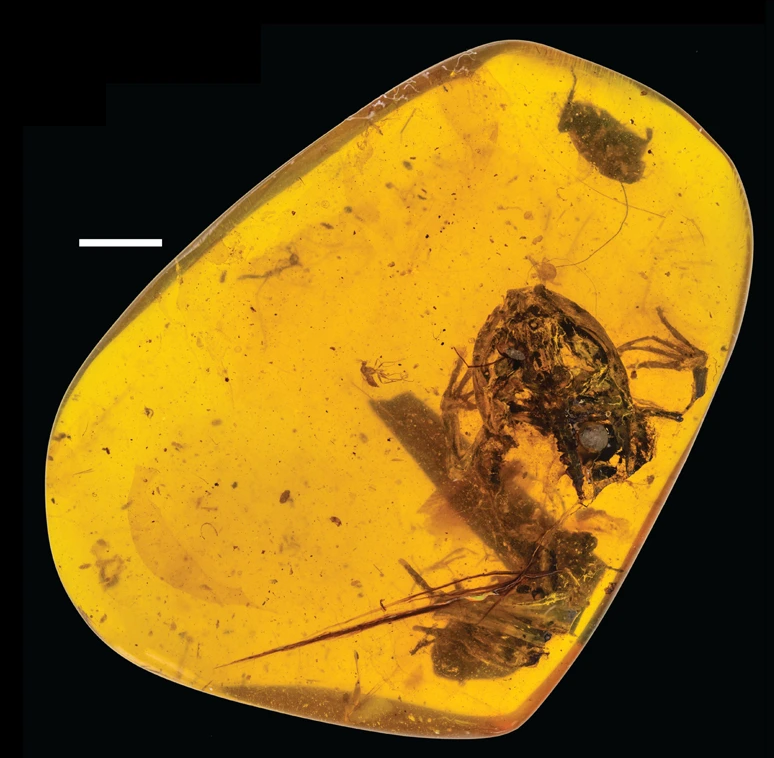
Fossil of the frog Electrorana in Burmese amber

Mummified wings of indeterminate juvenile birds belong to the extinct clade Enantiornithes red arrows point to the claws on the wings

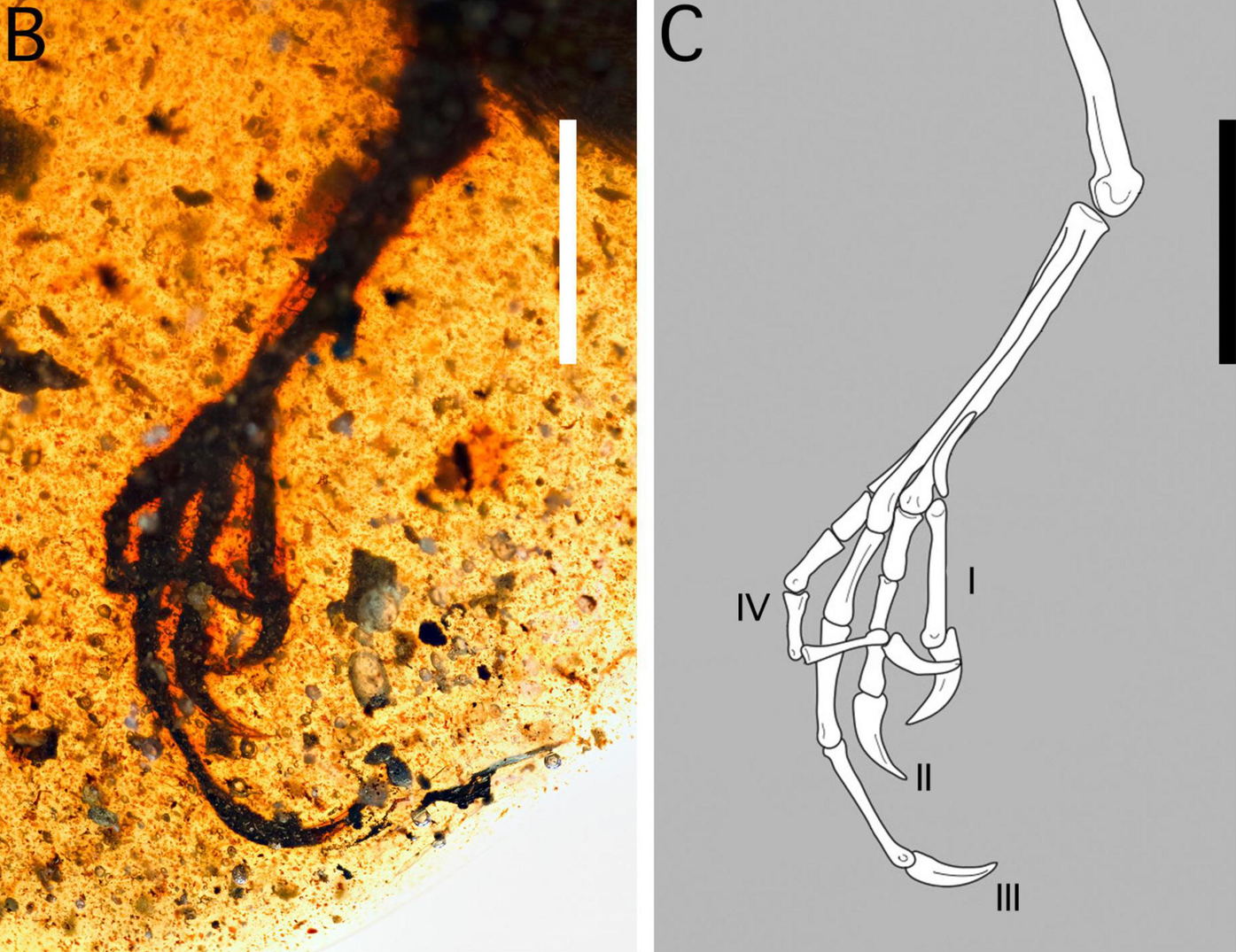
Foot of the enantiornithine bird Elektorornis

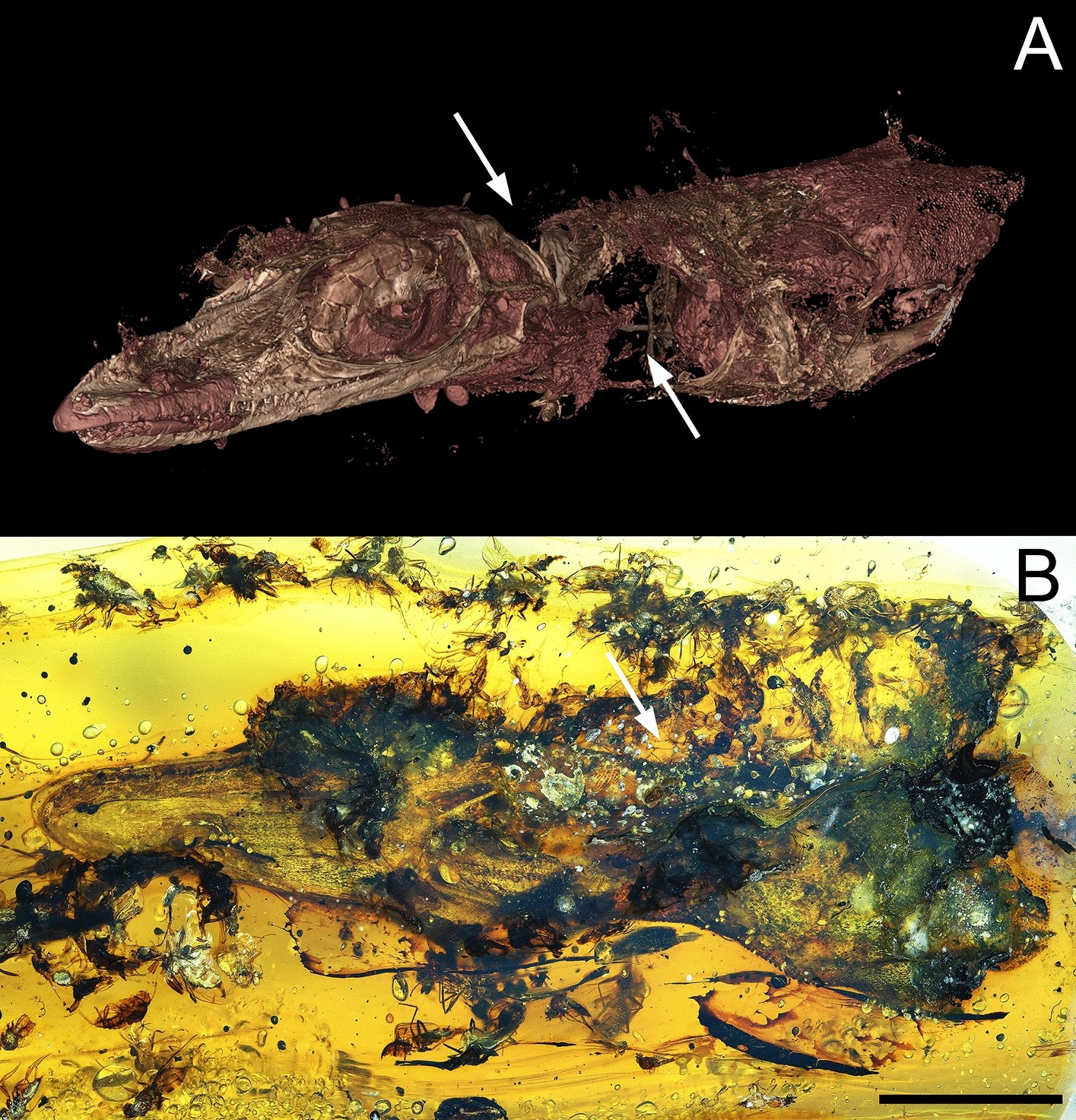
CT scan and photo of the extinct lizard Oculudentavis

Only a handful of vertebrates have been described from Burmese amber, these include the albanerpetontid (a group of extinct salamander-like amphibians) Yaksha, the frog Electrorana, a number of primitive toothed birds belonging to the extinct clade Enantiornithes, including the named species Elektorornis and Fortipesavis, the lizards Protodraco (suggested to be the oldest agamid), Cretaceogekko (suggested to be the oldest modern gecko), Carinasquama (a probable close relative of geckos), Electroscincus (the oldest known skink) Barlochersaurus, Oculudentavis (formerly erroneously considered to be a bird), and the snake Xiaophis. An indeterminate (possibly early branching) coelurosaurian theropod dinosaur is known from a tail with preserved feathers, along with the isolated feathers of non-avian pennaraptoran theropods.

=== Flora ===
Various fungi and flora. Top left (A+B) Selaginella (spikemoss) in association with the flower Antiquifloris latifibris Top right (C) Leaf fragment of the fern Cystodium. Bottom left (D) fungal hyphae Bottom right (E-H) flyspeck fungi-like growth on Selaginella leaves

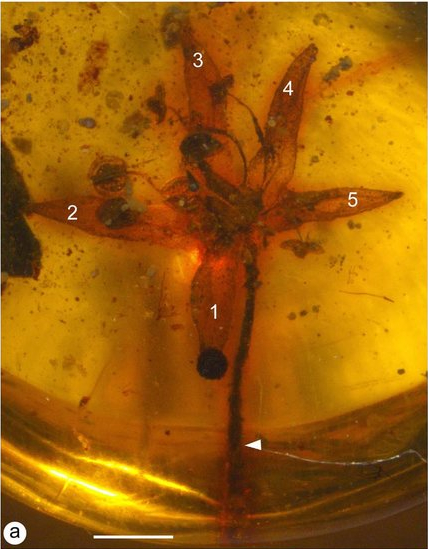
Flower of Lijinganthus revoluta , an extinct eudicot

A wide variety of plants have been reported from the deposit. Flowering plants are the most diverse, including basal angiosperms, eumagnoliids, monocots and eudicots. Other plants include conifers, bennettitaleans (as well as possibly other members of the Bennettitales-Erdtmanithecales-Gnetales group), ferns, lycophytes, bryophytes and possible pteridosperms.

=== Other ===
A number of fungi species have been reported, as well as various microorganisms.

== History ==
The amber is recorded as originating from Yunnan Province as early as the first century AD according to the Book of the Later Han. The trade of Burmese amber into China during the Han Dynasty has been confirmed by Fourier-transform infrared spectroscopy (FTIR) analysis of amber artifacts from the Eastern Han period (25 – 220 CE). It was first mentioned in European sources by the Jesuit Priest Álvaro Semedo who visited China in 1613, it was described as being "dug out of mines, and sometimes in great pieces, it is redder than our amber though not so clean". The locality itself has been known to European explorers since the 1800s with visitation to the Hukawng Valley by Simon Fraser Hannay in 1836–1837. At that time the principle products of the valley mines were salt, gold, and amber, with the majority of gold and amber being bought by Chinese traders. Hannay visited the amber mines themselves on March 21, 1836, and he noted that the last three miles to the mines were marked with numerous abandoned pits, up to 15 ft (4.6 m) in depth, where amber had been dug in the past. The mining had moved over the hill to a series of 10 pits but no visible amber was seen, suggesting that miners possibly hid the amber found that day before the party arrived. Mining was being performed manually at the time through the use of sharpened bamboo rods and small wooden shovels. Finer pieces of amber were recovered from the deeper pits, with clear yellow being recovered from depths of 40 ft (12 m) The recovered amber was bought with silver or often exchanged for jackets, hats, copper pots, or opium among other goods. Mixed and lower quality amber was sold from around 1/ ticals to 4 rupees per seer. Pieces that were considered high quality or fit for use as ornamentation were described as expensive, and price varied depending on the clarity and color of the amber. Women of the valley were noted to wear amber earrings as part of their jewelry. In 1885 the Konbaung dynasty was annexed to the British Raj and a survey of the area was conducted by Dr. Fritz Noetling on behalf of the Geological Survey of India. The final research before Burmese independence in 1947 was conducted by Dr. H.L. Chhibber in 1934, who provided the most detailed description of Burmite occurrences.

== History of research ==
While a 1892 study considered the amber likely to be Miocene in age, a study by Theodore Dru Alison Cockerell in 1916 noted the archaic nature of the insects, and concluded that the amber must be older, and possibly as old as the Late Cretaceous. Various later authors during the mid-late 20th century suggested either a Paleocene-Eocene or an Late Cretaceous age. A Cretaceous age was confirmed during the early 2000s. While during the 20th century and the first decade of the 21st century research on the deposit was low intensity, during the mid-2010s there was a great increase in the number of papers published on the deposit, numbering hundreds every year, with a plurality coming from Chinese researchers, rising from a few dozen species described per year prior to 2014 to over 350 in 2020, though this number had fallen to just over 250 by 2023. Both the great increase in the amber volume coming out of the mines, as well as a 2013 conference and a 2015 Burmese amber special issue in the journal Cretaceous Research have been cited as factors in the boom of publications.

== Modern exploitation and controversy ==
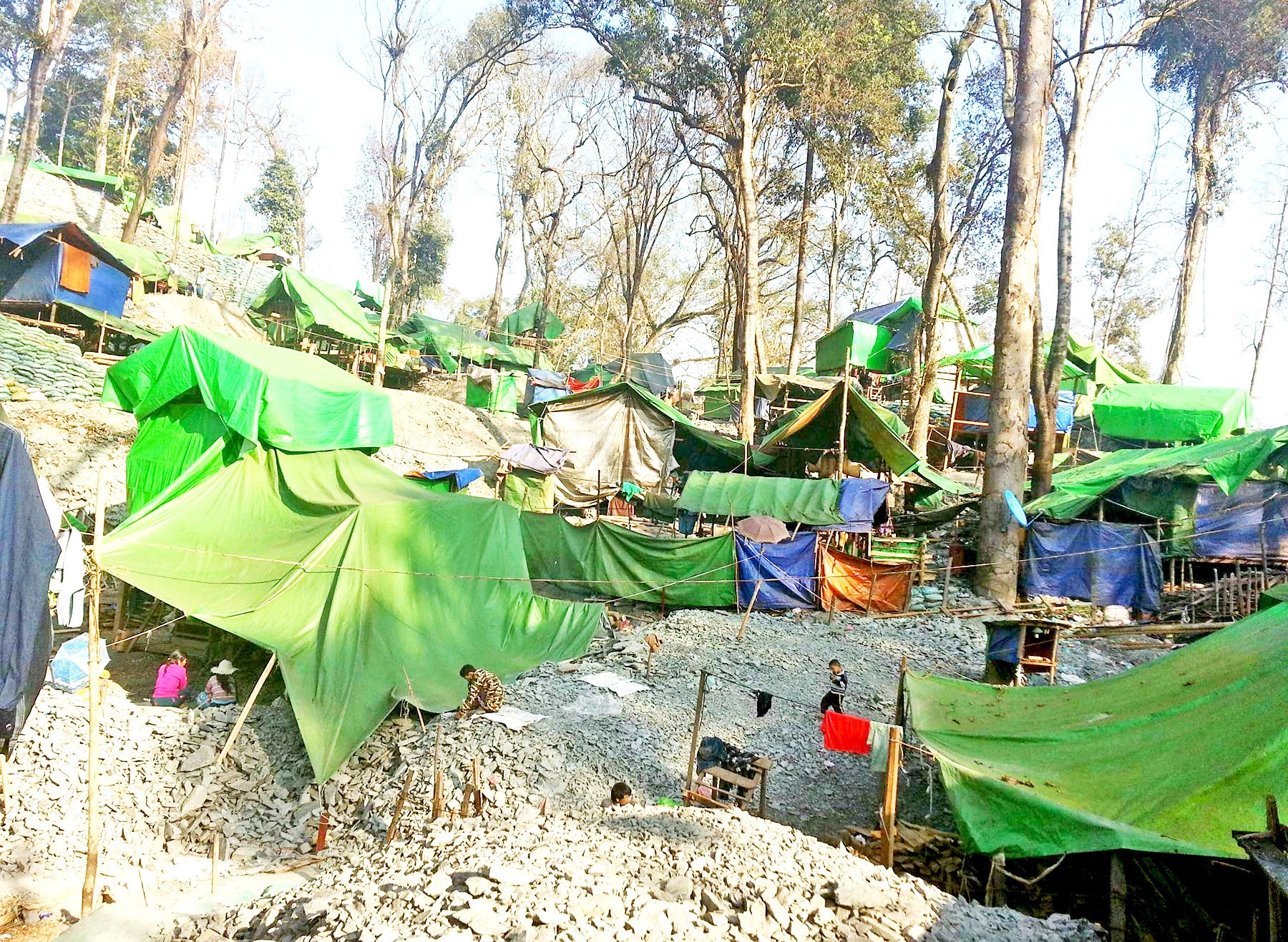
Miners digging and sorting Burmese amber at Noije Bum in the Hukawng Valley, before July 2020

Leeward Capital Corp, a small Canadian mining firm, began exporting amber from Myanmar during the 1990s, resulting in the description of a number of fossil species from the deposit. During the late 2000s, Burmese amber production began to increase as a result of the exhaustion of Chinese amber mines and greater trade between Myanmar and China in general, with the amber trade being initially unaffected by the outbreak of renewed conflict between the Kachin Independence Army (KIA), an armed rebel group seeking to secede from Myanmar, and the Burmese armed forces (Tatmadaw) in 2011. Despite the conflict between them, there was apparently a tacit agreement between the two groups to keep the amber trade flowing, with the KIA controlling the mines, while the Tatmadaw controlled their export to China, with both collecting taxes on the trade. Taxation by the KIA could be worth as much as 5-10% of the total value of the amber. In June 2017 the Tatmadaw seized control of the mines from the KIA.

The main amber market in Myanmar is Myitkyina, around 200 kilometres (120 mi) south of the amber mines, with much of this amber subsequently smuggled across the border into China. The primary Chinese market for Burmese amber is in Tengchong, Yunnan, with an estimated 100 tonnes of Burmese amber passing into the city in 2015, with a then estimated value between five and seven billion yuan, where it is primarily used for jewelry. Burmese amber was estimated to make up 30% of Tenchong's gemstone market (the rest being Myanmar Jade), and was declared one of the city's eight main industries by the local government. The presence of calcite veins are a major factor in determining the gem quality of pieces, with pieces with a large number of veins having significantly lower value.

Chinese demand for the amber began to slow during the late 2010s, likely either as a result of oversupply or bad economic conditions in China, resulting in the amber industry in Tengchong struggling, with many amber jewelry shops in the city closing. This was further exacerbated by the COVID pandemic during the early 2020s, resulting in the China-Myanmar border closing which forced traders to rely on the much smaller domestic Burmese market for the amber, as well renewed civil war following the 2021 Myanmar coup d'état resulting in increased conflict and insecurity in Kachin state making it more difficult to transport the amber and increased levels of fees extracted by armed groups from amber merchants.

The working conditions at the mines have been described as extremely unsafe, down 100 m (330 ft) deep pits barely wide enough to crawl through, with no accident compensation. Sales of amber were alleged to help fund the Kachin conflict by various news organisations in 2019. Interest in this discussion rose in March 2020 after the highly publicised description of Oculudentavis, which made the cover of Nature. On April 21, 2020, the Society of Vertebrate Paleontology (SVP) published a letter of recommendation to journal editors asking for "a moratorium on publication for any fossil specimens purchased from sources in Myanmar after June 2017 when the Myanmar military began its campaign to seize control of the amber mining". On April 23, 2020 Acta Palaeontologica Polonica stated that it would not accept papers on Burmese amber material collected from 2017 onwards, after the Burmese military took control of the deposit, requiring "certification or other demonstrable evidence, that they were acquired before the date both legally and ethically". On May 13, 2020, the Journal of Systematic Palaeontology published an editorial stating that it would no longer consider papers based whole or in part on Burmese amber material, regardless of whether in historic collections or not. On June 30, 2020, a statement from the International Palaeoentomological Society was published in response to the SVP, criticising the proposal to ban publishing on Burmese amber material. In August 2020, a comment from over 50 authors was published in PalZ responding to the SVP statement. The authors disagreed with the proposal of a moratorium, describing the focus on the Burmese amber as "arbitrary" and that "The SVP's recommendation for a moratorium on Burmese amber affects fossil non-vertebrate research much more than fossil vertebrate research and clearly does not represent this part of the palaeontological community."

The conclusion that Burmese amber funded the Tatmadaw was disputed by George Poinar and Sieghard Ellenberger in an April 2020 study, which found that the supply of amber collapsed after the 2017 takeover of the mines by the Tatmadaw, and that most of the current circulation of amber in Chinese markets was extracted prior to 2017. A story in Science in 2019 stated: "Two former mine owners, speaking through an interpreter in phone interviews, say taxes have been even steeper since government troops took control of the area. Both shut their mines when they became unprofitable after the government takeover, and almost all deep mines are now out of business, dealers here corroborate. Only shallow mines and perhaps a few secret operations are still running." There were around 200,000 miners working in the Hukawng valley mines prior to the takeover by the Tatmadaw, which shrunk to 20,000 or less after the military operations. Adolf Peretti, a gemologist who owns a museum with Burmese amber specimens, noted in 2021 that the 2017 cutoff suggested by the SVP does not take into account that the export of Burmese amber prior to 2017 was also funding internal conflict in Myanmar due to the control by the KIA. Much of the amber cutting since 2017 has been done in internally displaced person camps, under humanitarian and non-conflict conditions.

== Other amber deposits in Myanmar ==
Other deposits of amber are known from several regions in Myanmar, with noted deposits in the Shwebo District of the Sagaing Region, from the Pakokku and Thayet districts of Magway Region and the Bago District of the Bago Region.

=== Tilin amber ===
A 2018 study on an amber deposit from Tilin in central Myanmar indicated that deposit to be 27 million years younger than the Hukawng deposit, dating to approximately 72 million years old, placing it in the latest Campanian age. The deposit was associated with an overlying tuffaceous layer, and underlying nodules of brown sandstone yielded remains of the ammonite Sphenodiscus. Within a number of arthropod specimens were described though much more poorly preserved than specimens in the Hukawng amber. These include members of Hymenoptera (Braconidae, Diapriidae, Scelionidae), Diptera (Ceratopogonidae, Chironomidae), Dictyoptera (Blattaria, Mantodea), planthoppers, Berothidae and bark lice (Lepidopsocidae) as well as extant ant subfamilies Dolichoderinae and tentatively Ponerinae, as well as fragments of moss.

=== Hkamti amber ===
The Hkamti site is located ca. 90 km southwest of the Angbamo site and predominantly consists of limestone, interbedded with mudstone and tuff, the amber is found in the unconsolidated mudstone/tuff layers. A crinoid was found attached to one amber specimen, alongside marine plant remains in the surrounding sediment, indicating deposition in a shallow marine setting. The amber is generally red-brown, and yellow colouration is rare, the amber is generally found as angular clasts, indicating short transport distance and is more brittle than other northern Myanmar ambers. Zircon dating has constrained the age of the deposit to the early Albian, c. 110 Ma, significantly older than the dates obtained from other deposits. Fauna found in the amber include: Archaeognatha, Diplopoda, Coleoptera, Araneae, Trichoptera, Neuroptera, Psocodea, Isoptera, Diptera, Orthoptera, Pseudoscorpionida, Hymenoptera and Thysanoptera. A lizard, Retinosaurus, has also been described from the locality.
