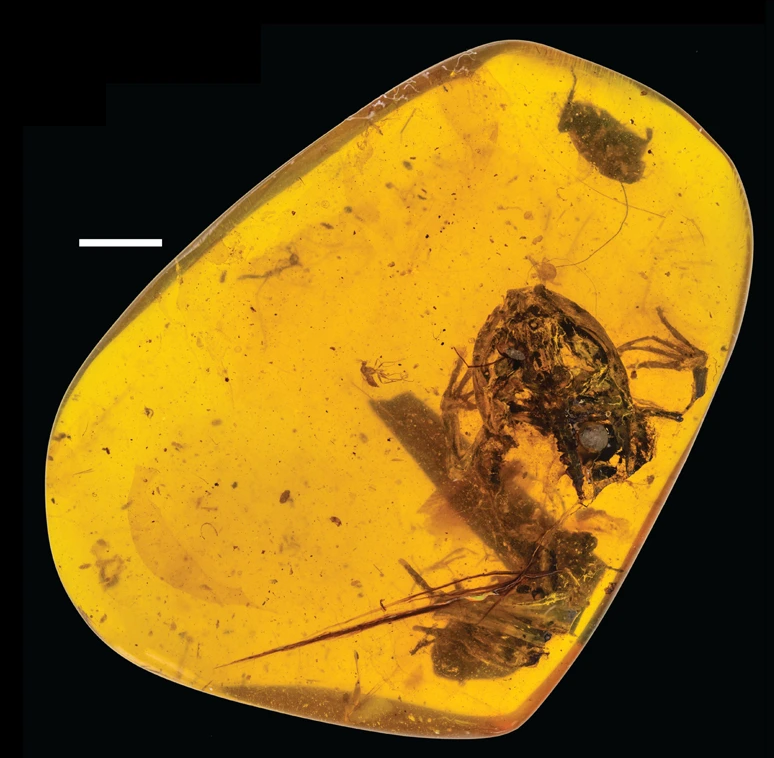
- Holotype in Burmese amber

Scientific classification
- Kingdom: Animalia
- Phylum: Chordata
- Class: Amphibia
- Order: Anura
- Genus: †Electrorana; Xing et al., 2018
- Species: †E. limoae

Binomial name
- †Electrorana limoae Xing et al., 2018

= Electrorana =

Electrorana Temporal range: Upper Cretaceous, Cenomanian

Extinct genus of amphibians

Electrorana is an extinct genus of frog that lived in what is now Myanmar during the mid-Cretaceous, around 99 million years ago. The type species and only species is Electrorana limoae. The generic name is derived from the Latin electrum (amber) and rana (frog), while the specific epithet is given in honour of Mrs. Mo Li, who purchased and provided the specimens for study.

== Description ==
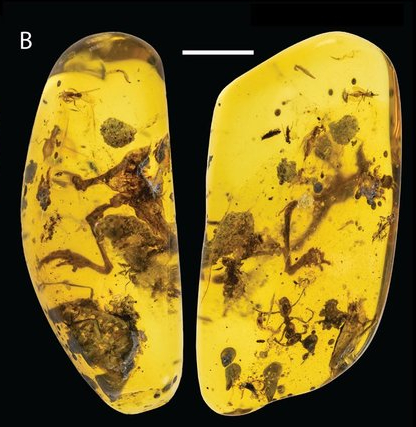
Paratype specimen

Electrorana was described on the basis of four different specimens found in Burmese amber, which show varying states of completeness. These specimens have a body length of 2 centimetres (0.79 in) though it has been suggested that they are likely to have been juveniles.

== Taxonomy ==
Phylogenetic analysis suggests that Electrorana is a relatively basal frog that lies outside of Neobatrachia, with unclear relationships to living basal frog clades. A close relationship with the extinct frog Aerugoamnis from the Eocene of North America has been found in some phylogenies.

== Ecology ==
Electrorana is thought to have lived in a tropical rainforest, making it one of the oldest known frogs to have inhabited such an environment.
