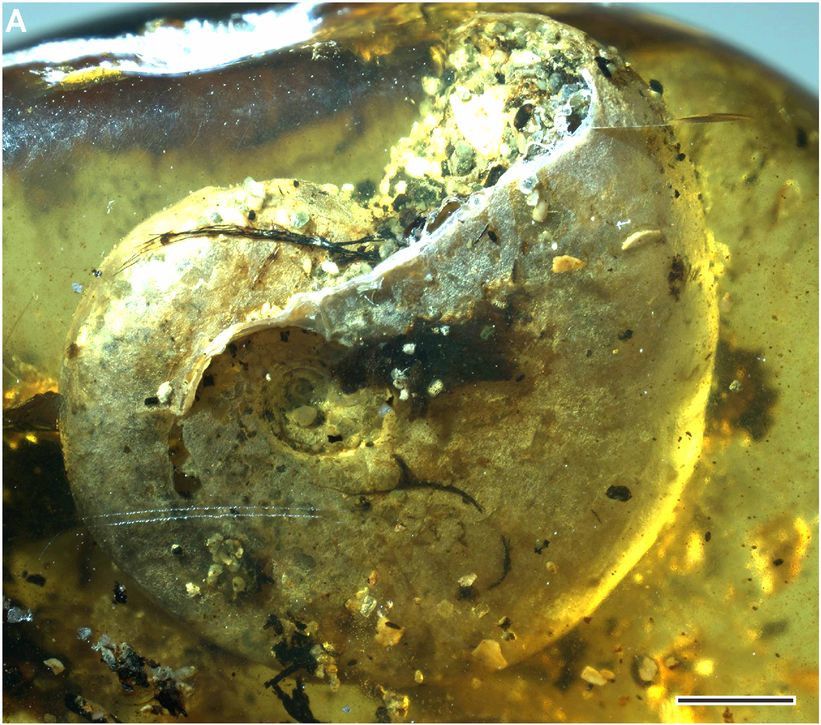
- Juvenile Puzosia (Bhimaites) shell in Burmese amber

Scientific classification
- Kingdom: Animalia
- Phylum: Mollusca
- Class: Cephalopoda
- Subclass: †Ammonoidea
- Order: †Ammonitida
- Family: †Desmoceratidae
- Genus: †Puzosia
- Subgenus: †Bhimaites; Matsumoto, 1954

Species
- Puzosia (Bhimaites) bhima; Puzosia (Bhimaites) stoliczkai

= Puzosia (Bhimaites) =

Puzosia (Bhimaites) Temporal range: Albian–Cenomanian

Subgenus of molluscs (fossil)

Puzosia (Bhimaites) is a subgenus of desmoceratid ammonites with a subinvolute, mostly smooth, high whorled shell with convex or flat sides and frequent constrictions on the venter. It is included in the subfamily Puzosiinae and has been found in Upper Albian and Cenomanian sediments in Angola, South Africa, and southern India.

In 2019, a Bhimaites shell was found fossilized in a 99 million-year-old chunk of Burmese amber from Myanmar, marking the first known discovery of an ammonite preserved in amber. The ammonite's shell was presumably picked up and preserved after the resin fell off a tree and tumbled across the seashore.
