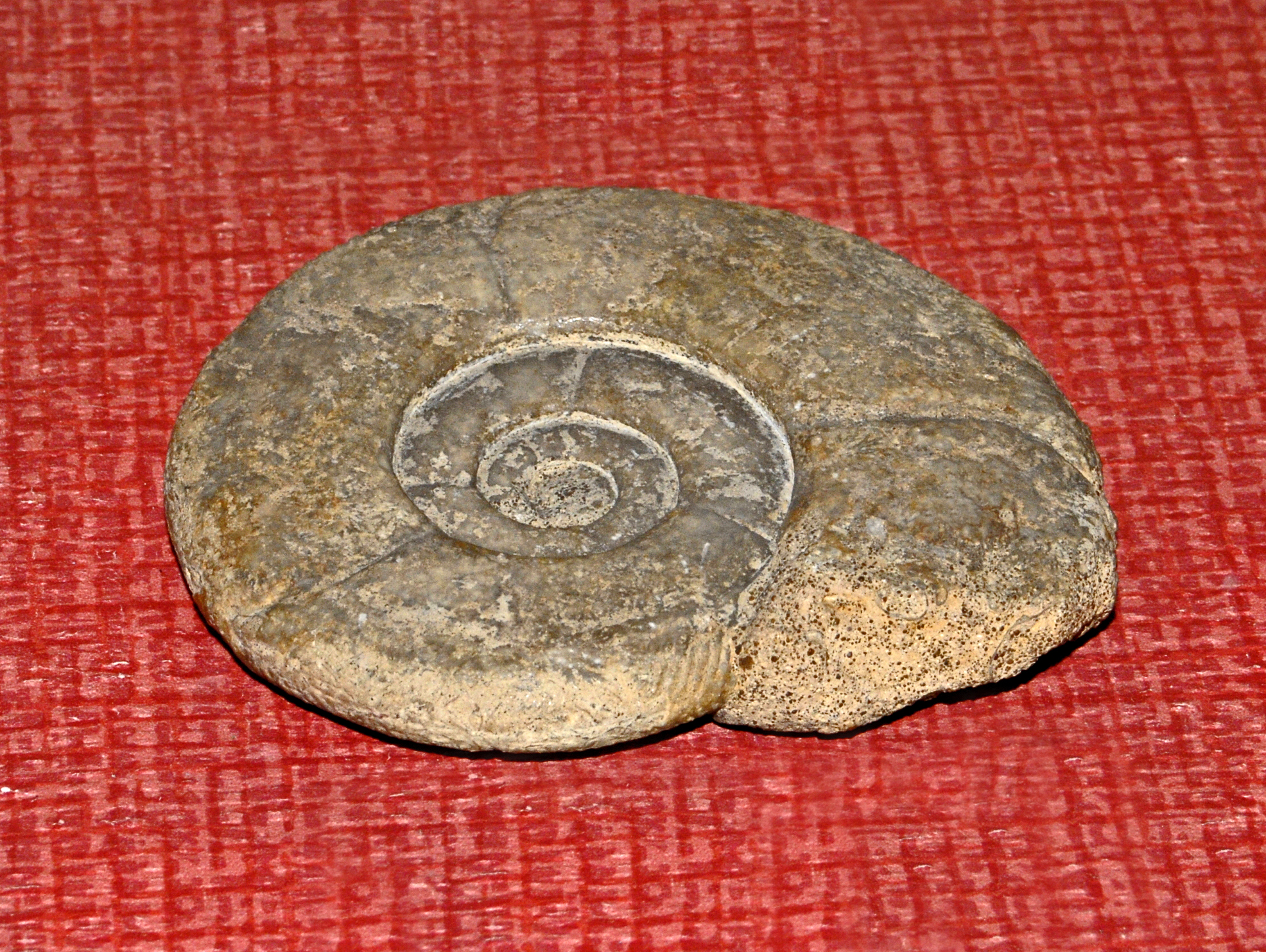
- Fossil shell of Puzosia compressa from Madagascar, on display at Galerie de paléontologie et d'anatomie comparée in Paris

Scientific classification
- Kingdom: Animalia
- Phylum: Mollusca
- Class: Cephalopoda
- Subclass: †Ammonoidea
- Order: †Ammonitida
- Family: †Desmoceratidae
- Subfamily: †Puzosiinae
- Genus: †Puzosia; Bayle, 1878

= Puzosia =

Puzosia Temporal range: Aptian–Maastrichtian

Genus of molluscs (fossil)

Puzosia is a genus of desmoceratid ammonites, and the type genus for the Puzosiinae, which lived during the middle part of the Cretaceous, from early Aptian to Maastrichtian (125.5 to 70.6 Ma). Sepkoski defines the range from Albian to Santonian. The generic name comes from the Serbian words "Puž" (snail) and "oce/ose" (axis), gaining its name from the shell's snail-like appearance.

== Children taxa ==
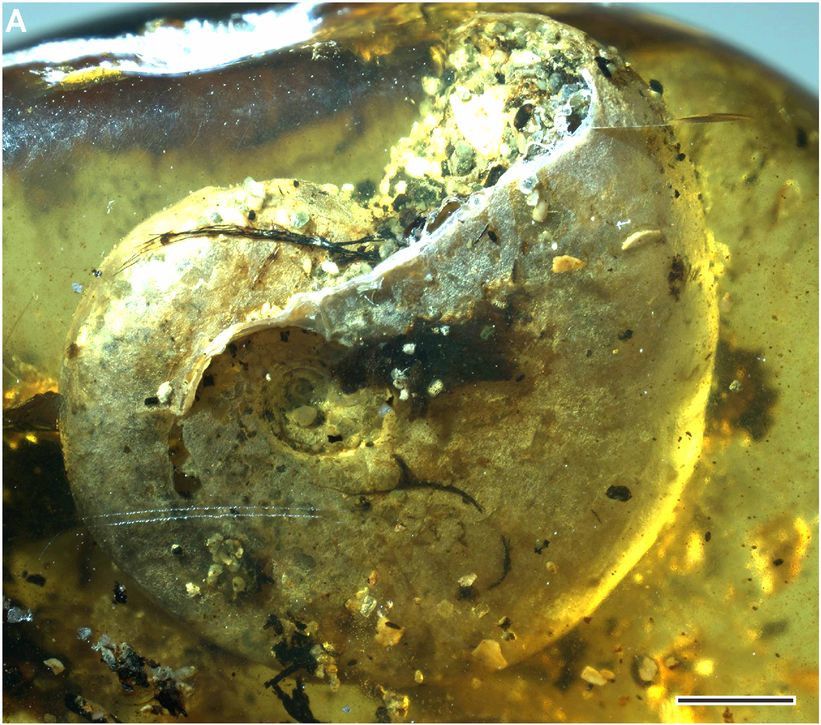
A Puzosia (Bhimaites) species juvenile shell in Burmese amber

Subgenera and species of Puzosia:

- Puzosia (Anapuzosia) Matsumoto 1954
- Puzosia (Bhimaites) Matsumoto 1954
  - Puzosia (Bhimaites) bhima Stoliczka 1865
  - Puzosia (Bhimaites) stoliczkai Kossmat 1898
- Puzosia (Eocanadoceras) Anderson 1958
  - Puzosia (Eocanadoceras) hannai Anderson 1958
- Puzosia (Latidorsella) Jacob 1907
- Puzosia (Puzosia) Bayle 1878
  - Puzosia (Puzosia) communis Spath 1923
  - Puzosia (Puzosia) compressa Kossmat 1898
  - Puzosia (Puzosia) mayoriana d'Orbigny 1841
  - Puzosia (Puzosia) paronae Kilian 1900
  - Puzosia (Puzosia) planulatus Sowerby 1827
  - Puzosia (Puzosia) sharpei Spath 1923
  - Puzosia alaskana Imlay 1960
  - Puzosia angladei Savn 1890
  - Puzosia bistricta White 1887
  - Puzosia brasiliana Maury 1936
  - Puzosia crebrisulcata Kossmat 1898
  - Puzosia cuvervillei Meunier 1888
  - Puzosia dilleri Anderson 1902
  - Puzosia lata Seitz 1931
  - Puzosia lata Seitz 1931
  - Puzosia longmani Whitehouse 1926
  - Puzosia media Seitz 1931
  - Puzosia puma Murphy & Rodda 1960
  - Puzosia quenstedti Parona and Bonarelli 1897
  - Puzosia skidegatensis McLearn 1972
  - Puzosia spathi Venzo 1936
  - Puzosia sullivanae Murphy & Rodda 1960
  - Puzosia tenuis Haas 1942

== Description ==
The shell of Puzosia is basically discoidal, evolute to subinvolute, with a wide umbiicaus. Sides bear close spaced sinuous ribs, periodically interrupted by narrow sinuous constrictions, about six per whorl. Whorl section is somewhat compressed, higher than wide, with slightly convex sides and rounded venter. The suture is complexly ammonitic.

== Distribution ==
Fossils of species within this genus have been found in the Cretaceous sediments of Angola, Argentina, Australia, Brazil, Canada, Colombia (Tolima), Egypt, France, Germany, India, Iran, Italy, Japan, Madagascar, Mexico, New Zealand, Nigeria, Peru, Russia, South Africa, Spain, Suriname, the United Kingdom, United States.

In 2019, a Puzosia (Bhimaites) shell was found fossilized in a 99 million-year-old chunk of Burmese amber from Myanmar, marking the first known discovery of an ammonite preserved in amber. The ammonite's shell was presumably picked up and preserved after the resin fell off a tree and tumbled across the seashore.
