= PalZ =

- Discipline: Palaeontology
- Language: predominantly English
- Edited by: Mike Reich

Publication details
- Former name: Paläontologische Zeitschrift
- History: 1914–present
- Publisher: Axel Springer AG (Germany)

Standard abbreviations
- ISO 4: PalZ

Indexing
- ISSN: 0031-0220 (print); 1867-6812 (web)

Links
- Journal homepage

PalZ (formerly Paläontologische Zeitschrift) is an international, peer-reviewed periodical focused on palaeontology and published by the palaeontological society of Germany (Paläontologische Gesellschaft). The first issue was released in 1914. Until 1998 the journal was issued semiannually. From there on 4 issues were published each year. From 2009 on the periodical is printed and distributed by the Axel Springer AG.

PalZ publishes articles in the field of vertebrate palaeontology, invertebrate palaeontology, micropalaeontology and ichnology to approximately the same extent. While the publication language was predominantly German in most of the 20th century, it successively shifted to English since the 1980s.
