= Haploceratoidea =

Haploceratoidea Temporal range: Bajocian–Albian

Scientific classification
- Kingdom: Animalia
- Phylum: Mollusca
- Class: Cephalopoda
- Subclass: †Ammonoidea
- Order: †Ammonitida
- Suborder: †Ammonitina
- Superfamily: †Haploceratoidea; Zittel, 1884

Families
- see text

Extinct superfamily of molluscs

Haploceratoidea, formerly Haplocerataceae, is an extinct superfamily of ammonoid cephalopods belonging to the Ammonitida that unites five families, Strigoceratidae, Oppeliidae, Haploceratidae, Binneyitidae, and Lissoceratidae, listed below.

Haploceratoidea begins in the Early Jurassic with Oppeliidae and Strigeroceratidae, followed by the appearance of Haploceratidae and Lissocertidae in the Middle Jurassic. Strigoceratidae is limited to the Bajocian but Oppeliidae, and Haploceratidae extend through the remaining Jurassic, well into the Cretaceous; the Oppeliidae into the middle Albian, the Haplocertidae only into the Valanginian. The Lissoceratidae survive to the Late Jurassic. Binneyitidae appear in the Late Cretaceous, lasting only from the Cenomanian until the Coniacian.

== Diagnosis ==
Haploceratoidea are typically compressed, discoidal Ammontida that may be keeled or unkeeled, tending to be oxyconic, with usually falcoid or falcate ribbing. The aptychi are paired and differ between families and have been found in situ in e.g. Oppelia subrudiata and in Pseudolissoceras.

== Taxonomy ==
The Origin of the Haploceratoidea is undetermined but it is likely all five component families have their beginnings in the Hammatoceratidae in the middle Bajocian. None of the Haploceratoidea is thought to have given rise to any subsequent group.

Superfamily Haploceratoidea Zittel, 1884

- Family Haploceratidae Zittel, 1884
  - Genus Glochiceras Hyatt, 1900
  - Genus Haploceras Zittel, 1870
  - Genus Neolissoceras Spath, 1923
- Family Oppeliidae Bonarelli, 1894
  - Subfamily Aconeceratinae (Spath, 1923)
    - Genus Aconeceras Hyatt, 1903
    - Genus Gyaloceras Whitehouse, 1927
    - Genus Koloceras Riccardi et al., 1987
    - Genus Sanmartinoceras
  - Subfamily Hecticoceratinae Spath, 1925
    - Genus Hecticoceras Bonarelli, 1893
    - Genus Pseudosonninia Parent, 2019
  - Subfamily Mazapilitinae Spath, 1928
  - Subfamily Oppeliinae Bonarelli, 1894
    - Genus Submazapilites Cantu-Chapa, 1962
  - Subfamily Streblitinae Spath, 1925
    - Genus Bornhardticeras Böhm & Riedel, 1933
    - Genus Cyrtosiceras Hyatt, 1900
    - Genus Substreblites Spath, 1925
    - Genus Uhligites Kilian, 1913
  - Subfamily incertae sedis
    - Genus Naramoceras McNamara, 1985
- Family Strigoceratidae Buckman, 1924
  - Genus Oecoptychius
  - Genus Phlycticeras Hyatt, 1900
  - Genus Strigoceras Quenstedt, 1886
- Family Lissoceratidae
  - Genus Lissoceras Bayle, 1879
  - Genus Lissoceratoides
- Family Binneyitidae
  - Genus Binneyites Reeside, 1927
  - Genus Borissiakoceras Archangelskil, 1916
  - Genus Johnsonites Cobban, 1961
