= Alcidellus =

Alcidellus Temporal range: Bathonian–Callovian

Scientific classification
- Kingdom: Animalia
- Phylum: Mollusca
- Class: Cephalopoda
- Subclass: †Ammonoidea
- Order: †Ammonitida
- Family: †Oppeliidae
- Subfamily: †Oppeliinae
- Genus: †Alcidellus; Westermann, 1958

Middle Jurassic haploceratacean ammonite

Alcidellus is an oxyconic (sharp ventered) haploceratacean ammonite from the Middle Jurassic.

Alcidellus was named as a genus buy Gerd Westermann in 1958. It is now generally seen as a subgenus of Oxycerites, differing from Oxyceratites (O) in having a broader venter with ventrolateral shoulders. The shell of Oxycerites, including O (Alcidellus) is generally smooth, essentially involute with a small umbilicus, highly compressed with flanks converging on a narrow, somewhat sharp venter. Sutures are ammonitic.
