= Campylites =

Campylites Temporal range: Oxfordian

Scientific classification
- Kingdom: Animalia
- Phylum: Mollusca
- Class: Cephalopoda
- Subclass: †Ammonoidea
- Order: †Ammonitida
- Family: †Oppeliidae
- Subfamily: †Ochetoceratinae
- Genus: †Campylites; Roller, 1922

Extinct genus of molluscs

Campylites is a genus within the oppeliida subfamily Ochetoceratinae, equivalent to Neoprionoceras Spath 1928, that lived during the Oxfordian state at the beginning of the Late Jurassic.

Campylites differs from Ochetoceras in its narrower and more definitely tricarinate venter and in having more distinct primary ribs. It also lacks the mid lateral groove characteristic of Ochetoceras.
