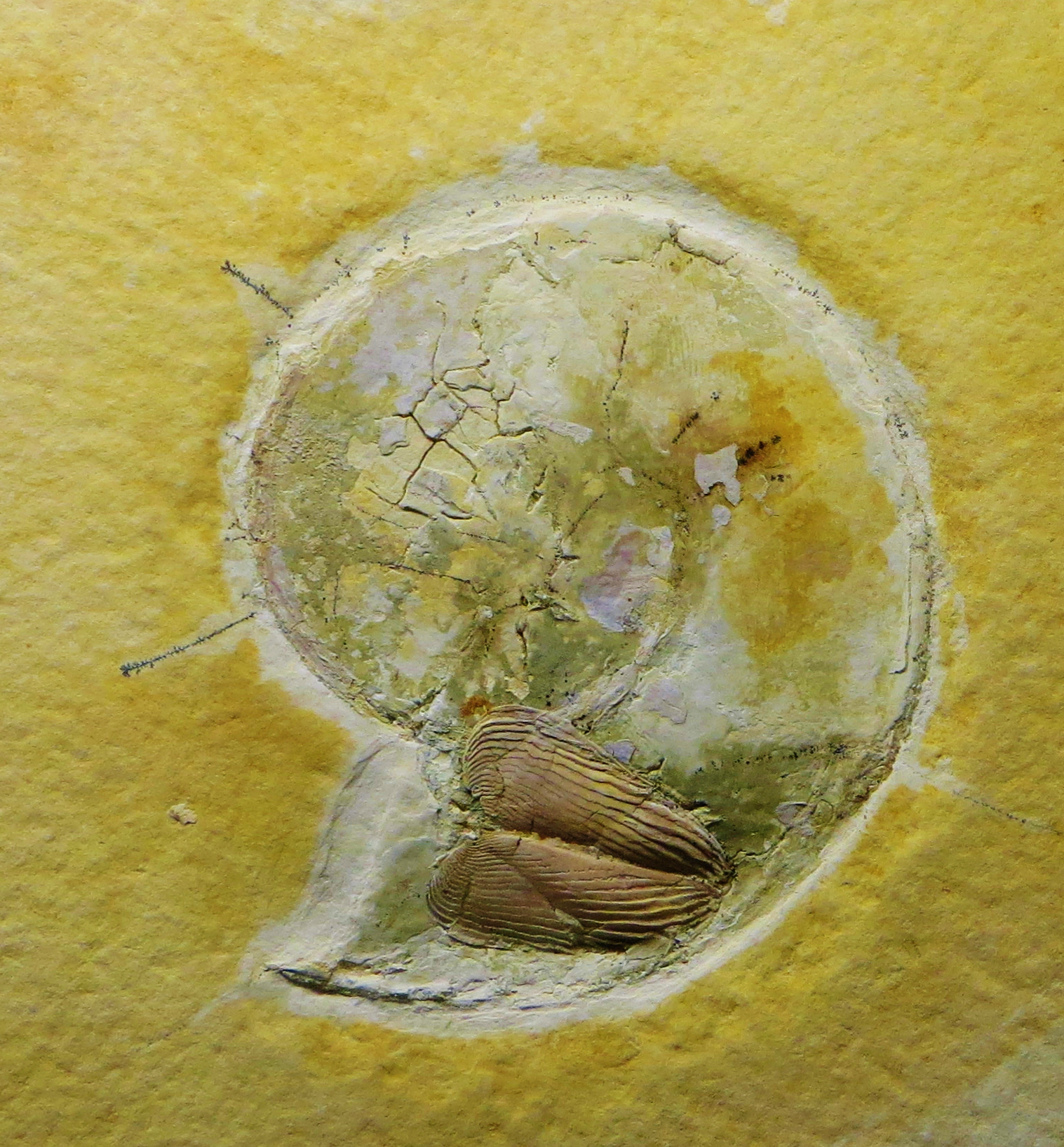
- Oppelia with paired aptychi in place

Scientific classification
- Kingdom: Animalia
- Phylum: Mollusca
- Class: Cephalopoda
- Subclass: †Ammonoidea
- Order: †Ammonitida
- Family: †Oppeliidae
- Subfamily: †Oppeliinae
- Genus: †Oppelia; Waagen, 1869

Species
- Oppelia mamertensis Waagen, 1869; Oppelia paronai Trauth, 1922; Oppelia plicatella Gemmellaro, 1877; Oppelia propefusca Gregorio, 1886; Oppelia subcostaria Oppel, 1862; Oppelia yeovilensis Rollier, 1911

= Oppelia =

Oppelia Temporal range: Aalenian–Bajocian

Genus of molluscs (fossil)

Oppelia is a haploceratoid ammonite and type genus for the Oppeliidae that lived during the Middle Jurassic. Shells of Oppelia are involute with a small to moderate size umbilicus, bluntly rounded to sharp venter, and deeply impressed dorsum. Sides are generally smooth but may be variously ribbed on the outer flanks. Similar and related genera include Oxycerites and Oecotraustes.

== Distribution ==
Jurassic of Germany, Greenland, India, Italy, Madagascar, Mexico, Poland, Spain and the United Kingdom
