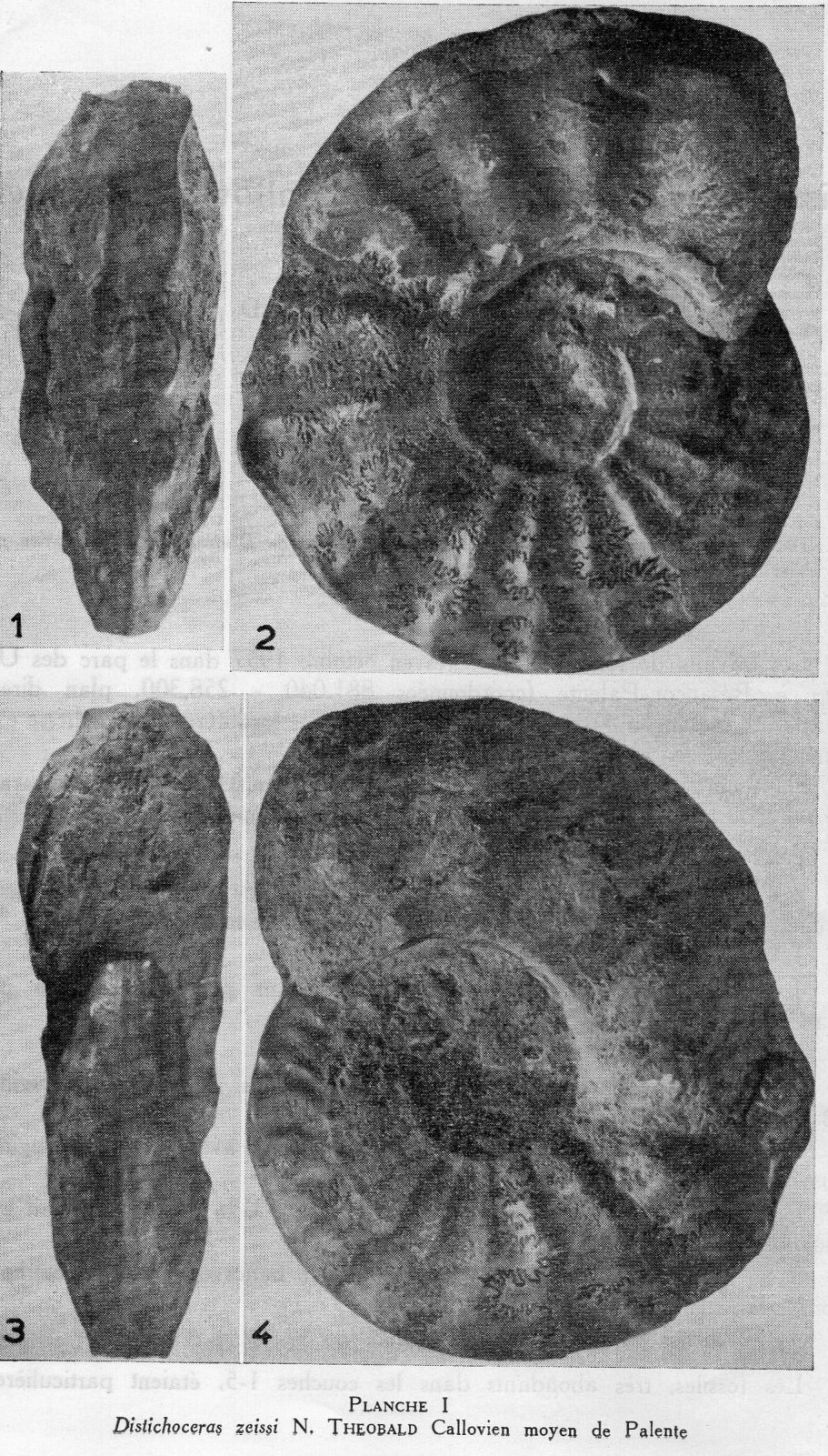
- Distichoceras zeissi, described by Nicolas Théobald, Scientific Annals of the University of Besançon, 2nd series, Géologie 8 (1958) p. 3-7

Scientific classification
- Domain: Eukaryota
- Kingdom: Animalia
- Phylum: Mollusca
- Class: Cephalopoda
- Subclass: †Ammonoidea
- Order: †Ammonitida
- Family: †Oppeliidae
- Subfamily: †Distichoceratinae
- Genus: †Distichoceras; Munier-Chalmas, 1892

Species
- see text

= Distichoceras =

Distichoceras Temporal range: Callovian–Oxfordian

Extinct family of molluscs

Distichoceras is a member of the Haploceratacean family, Oppeliidae, and type genus for the subfamily Distichoceratinae, found in upper Middle and lower Upper Jurassic sediments in Europe, Algeria, India, and Madagascar. The shell is essentially evolute and compressed with the outer flanks converging on a narrow, keeled venter; inner flanks which may be feebly ribbed, are separated from outer by a shallow spiral groove or band. Ribs on outer flanks end on or are looped to tall clavi (elongate tubercles or nodes) that line the venter, standing above the keel.
