= Petitclercia =

Petitclercia Temporal range: Callovian

Scientific classification
- Kingdom: Animalia
- Phylum: Mollusca
- Class: Cephalopoda
- Subclass: †Ammonoidea
- Order: †Ammonitida
- Family: †Strigoceratidae
- Genus: †Petitclercia

Genus of molluscs (fossil)

Petitclercia is a genus of molluscs from the strigoceratid subfamily Disticocratinae which are included in the ammonitid superfamily Haplocerataceae. Petitclercia, named by Rollier, 1909.

The shell of Petitclercia is involute, very compressed, with a sharp umbilical angle and sharp fastigate venter. Spath (1928)speculated that Petitclercia is perhaps "an involute development of Chanasia", another of the Distichoceratinae.

== Distribution ==
Only found in the upper Middle Jurassic (Callovian) of Vendée, France.
