= Ochetoceras =

Ochetoceras Temporal range: Oxfordian–Kimmeridgian

Scientific classification
- Kingdom: Animalia
- Phylum: Mollusca
- Class: Cephalopoda
- Subclass: †Ammonoidea
- Order: †Ammonitida
- Family: †Oppeliidae
- Subfamily: †Ochetoceratinae
- Genus: †Ochetoceras; Haug, 1855

Genus of molluscs (fossil)

Ochetoceras is a genus of ammonites, belonging to the Oppeliidae, that lived during the Late Jurassic from the early Oxfordian to the early Tithonian, and type for the subfamily Ochetoceratinae.

The shell of Ochetoceras is rather involute and strongly ribbed. The whorl section is compressed, higher than wide, and deeply impressed by the previous whorl. Flanks are broadly convex and converge to a narrowly rounded venter. Flanks are in two parts, inner and outer, separated by a lateral groove found also in Glochiceras and less pronounced in (Chanasia). Inner ribs slant strongly forward going radially outward and a fairly wide spaced. Outer ribs are fairly radial but curve slightly forward at the ventro-lateral shoulder; are more numerous and closer spaced. The narrow venter is smooth with a pronounced median keel.

Ochetoceras has been found in Europe, North Africa, Russia, Iran, Mexico, Cuba, and Chili. The type, O. canaliculatum (Buch) is from the Oxfordian of Germany.
