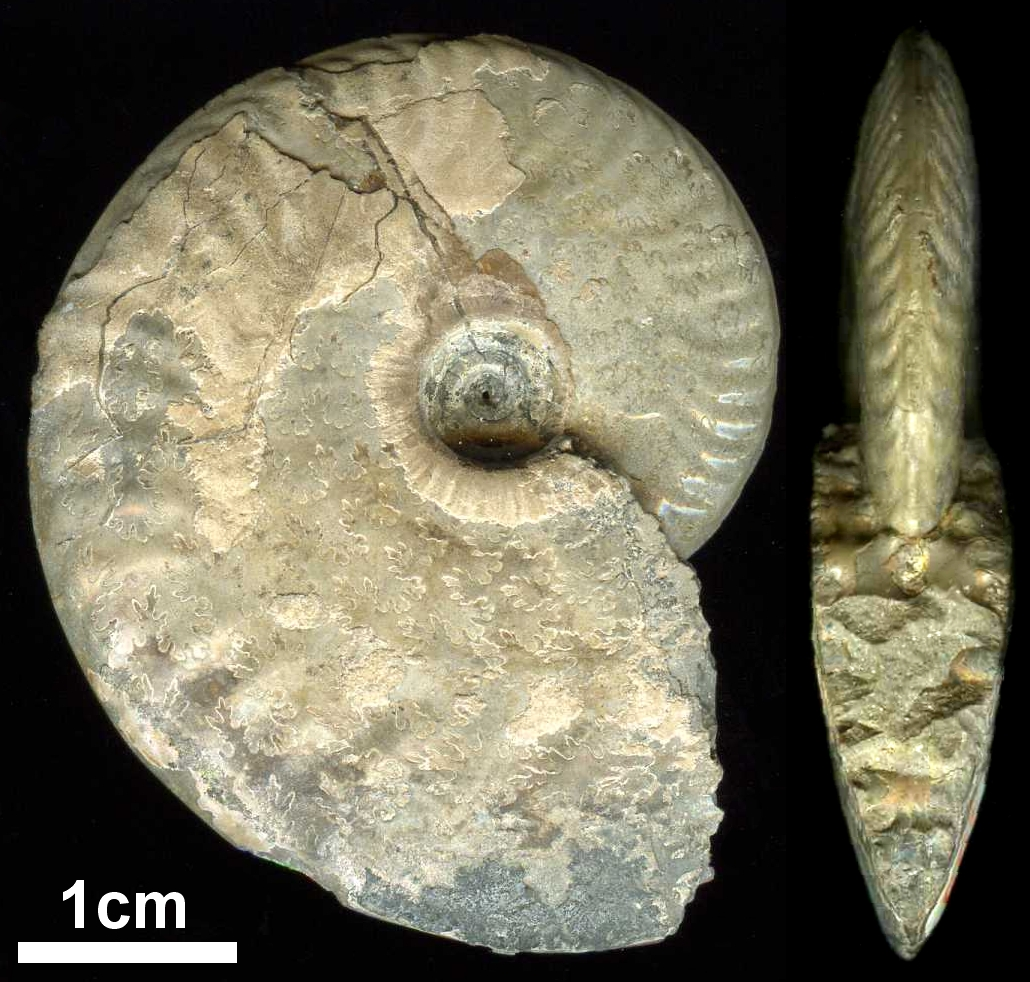
- Specimen from Poland

Scientific classification
- Kingdom: Animalia
- Phylum: Mollusca
- Class: Cephalopoda
- Subclass: †Ammonoidea
- Order: †Ammonitida
- Family: †Oppeliidae
- Subfamily: †Oppeliinae
- Genus: †Oxycerites

Species
- see text

= Oxycerites =

Oxycerites Temporal range: Bajocian–Callovian

Genus of molluscs (fossil)

Oxycerites is an extinct ammonoid cephalopod belonging to the haploceratoid family, Oppeliidae, that lived during the Middle Jurassic.

Shells of Oxycerites are involute, compressed and generally smooth with a sharply rounded venter on the outer rim, deeply impressed dorsum on the inner rim, and a small umbilicus. The living chamber takes up slightly more than half a whorl. Oxycerites grew to a diameter of at least 17.5 cm, about 7 inches.

Oppelia and Oecotraustes are similar and closely related forms. Oppelia is smoother, Oecotraustes more strongly ribbed

== Distribution ==
Jurassic of Argentina, France, Germany, Iran, Madagascar, Russia, Saudi Arabia and the United Kingdom
