= Berniceras =

Berniceras Temporal range: Oxfordian

Scientific classification
- Kingdom: Animalia
- Phylum: Mollusca
- Class: Cephalopoda
- Subclass: †Ammonoidea
- Order: †Ammonitida
- Family: †Oppeliidae
- Genus: †Berniceras

Species
- See text

Extinct ammonite genus

Berniceras is an extinct ammonite genus from the order Ammonitida that lived during the early Oxfordian stage of the Late Jurassic. Berniceras is included in the ammonite (sensu stricto) family, Oppeliidae.

Bernceras, which has been found in Europe, has a moderately enlarging, ribbed, involute shell with a keel along the venter, which forms the outer rim. The ribs are formed on the outer flanks and curve forward ventrally.

== Distribution ==
Jurassic of France
