= Cymaceras =

Cymaceras Temporal range: Kimmeridgian

Scientific classification
- Kingdom: Animalia
- Phylum: Mollusca
- Class: Cephalopoda
- Subclass: †Ammonoidea
- Order: †Ammonitida
- Family: †Oppeliidae
- Subfamily: †Ochetoceratinae
- Genus: †Cymaceras; Quenstedt, 1887

Extinct genus of molluscs

Cymaceras is a genus within the oppeliid subfamily Ochetoceratinae from the Kimmeridgian stage, around the middle of the Upper Jurassic.

Cymaceras is rather unusual in its wavy keel that leans alternatingly to one side then the other. Shells are involute, compressed, with a narrow venter and distinct inner and outer ribs, both sets of which are curved in a concave forward fashion.
