= Bradfordia =

Bradfordia Temporal range: Aalenian–Bajocian

Scientific classification
- Kingdom: Animalia
- Phylum: Mollusca
- Class: Cephalopoda
- Subclass: †Ammonoidea
- Order: †Ammonitida
- Family: †Oppeliidae
- Subfamily: †Oppeliinae
- Genus: †Bradfordia; Buckman, 1910

Genus of molluscs (fossil)

Bradfordia is a moderately involute to involute genus included in the ammonoid cephalopod family Oppeliidae, coiled so that the outer whorl encloses most, or much, of the previous, but with a small umbilicus exposing inner whorls. The shell is compressed, whorl height much greater than width, extending well out from the contact with the adjacent inner whorl. Outer flanks are finely ribbed and the rounded venter is smooth.

Bradfordia lived during the Middle Jurassic.
