= Acanthaecites =

Acanthaecites Temporal range: Callovian

Scientific classification
- Domain: Eukaryota
- Kingdom: Animalia
- Phylum: Mollusca
- Class: Cephalopoda
- Subclass: †Ammonoidea
- Order: †Ammonitida
- Family: †Oppeliidae
- Genus: †Acanthaecites; Rollier 1909

Genus of molluscs (fossil)

Acanthaecites is an extinct cephalopod genus belonging to the ammonoid family Oppeliidae first described by Rollier in 1909. Acanthaecites both appears and disappears from the fossil record during the Callovian stage of the Jurassic Period.

The shell of Acanthaecites is small, globose and smooth except for a median ventral row of distinct sharp serrations.
