= Praestrigites =

Praestrigites Temporal range: Aalenian–Bajocian

Scientific classification
- Kingdom: Animalia
- Phylum: Mollusca
- Class: Cephalopoda
- Subclass: †Ammonoidea
- Order: †Ammonitida
- Family: †Strigoceratidae
- Genus: †Praestrigites; Buckman, 1924

Extinct genus of molluscs

Praestrigites is a genus from the family Strigoceratidae which is included in the ammonitid superfamily Haploceratoidea.

Praestrigites was named by Buckman in 1924, who also that year named the family Strigoceratidae. The genotype is P. praenuntius

== Distribution ==
Praestrigites comes from the Middle Jurassic (Bajocian) and has been found in Morocco.
