= Oxydiscites =

Oxydiscites Temporal range: Kimmeridgian

Scientific classification
- Kingdom: Animalia
- Phylum: Mollusca
- Class: Cephalopoda
- Subclass: †Ammonoidea
- Order: †Ammonitida
- Family: †Oppeliidae
- Subfamily: †Ochetoceratinae
- Genus: †Oxydiscites; Daque' 1933

Genus of molluscs (fossil)

Oxydiscites is a genus of ammonites from the Upper Jurassic Kimmeridgian included in the Ochetoceratinae, Oppeliidae. The shell is involute, compressed, with a minute umbilicus, sharp venter with a tall finely toothed keel, and faloid ribbing.
