= Creniceras =

Creniceras Temporal range: Oxfordian

Scientific classification
- Domain: Eukaryota
- Kingdom: Animalia
- Phylum: Mollusca
- Class: Cephalopoda
- Subclass: †Ammonoidea
- Order: †Ammonitida
- Family: †Oppeliidae
- Subfamily: †Streblitinae
- Genus: †Creniceras; Munier-Chalmas,1892

Species
- Creniceras crenatum; Creniceras lophotum; Creniceras renggeri

Extinct genus of ammonites

Creniceras is a rather small Upper Jurassic ammonite with a shell in the range of about 1.6 cm in diameter,(about 1/2 in). The shell of Creniceras is eccentrically coiled, compressed, and generally smooth, except for a median row of cockscomb serrations on the body chamber and the possibility of blunt ribbing on the sides.

Creniceras, named by Munier-Chalmas in 1892, is included in the oppeliid subfamily Teramelliceratinae, and has been found in Upper Jurassic (Oxfordian age) sediments in Europe and Syria.
