= Phlycticeratinae =

Phlycticeratinae Temporal range: M Jurassic (Callovian)

Scientific classification
- Kingdom: Animalia
- Phylum: Mollusca
- Class: Cephalopoda
- Subclass: †Ammonoidea
- Order: †Ammonitida
- Family: †Oppeliidae
- Subfamily: †Phlycticeratinae; Spath, 1928

Subfamily of molluscs (fossil)

Phlycticeratinae is an ammonite subfamily included in the Oppeliidae established for the genus Phlycticeras. Although there seems to be some affinity with Stephanoceratoidea it is most likely descended from some bathonian member of the Oppeliinae.

The genus Phlycticeras is involute, feebly but coarsely ribbed, tuberculate, strongly strigate, with serrated keel and moderately complex sutures.
