= Ochetoceratinae =

Ochetoceratinae Temporal range: 161.2–145.5 Ma

Scientific classification
- Kingdom: Animalia
- Phylum: Mollusca
- Class: Cephalopoda
- Subclass: †Ammonoidea
- Order: †Ammonitida
- Family: †Oppeliidae
- Subfamily: †Ochetoceratinae; Spath, 1928.

Genera
- Ochetoceras, type; Canaliculites, Jeannet 1951; Cubaochetoceras; Cymaceras; Fehlmanites, Jeannet 1951; Oxydiscites

Extinct subfamily of molluscs

The Ochetoceratinae is a subfamily within the Oppeliidae from the Upper Jurassic, shells of which are typically oxycones with a tricarinate venter and falcoid ribbing, commonly divided by a median lateral groove or fillet. The median (middle) keel is the tallest.

The Ochetoceratinae may be polyphyletic, derived from both the Oppeliidae and Hecticoceratinae as suggested by differences in the included genera.

== Description ==
The median lateral groove is well developed in Ochetoceras and Fehlmanites, less discernible in Cymaceras, but missing or difficult to make out in the other four.
