= Magharina =

Magharina Temporal range: Bajocian

Scientific classification
- Kingdom: Animalia
- Phylum: Mollusca
- Class: Cephalopoda
- Subclass: †Ammonoidea
- Order: †Ammonitida
- Family: †Oppeliidae
- Subfamily: †Oppeliinae
- Genus: †Magharina; Arkell, 1952

Species
- Magharina magharensis Arkell, 1952

Genus of molluscs (fossil)

Magharina small upper Bajocian genus of ammonite (order Ammonitida) with a small smooth involute shell having a single keel along the venter and extremely simple sutures. Found in Egypt. The type species is M. magharensis.
