= Protaconeceras =

Protaconeceras Temporal range: Lower Cretaceous

Scientific classification
- Kingdom: Animalia
- Phylum: Mollusca
- Class: Cephalopoda
- Subclass: †Ammonoidea
- Order: †Ammonitida
- Family: †Oppeliidae
- Subfamily: †Aconeceratinae
- Genus: †Protaconeceras

Protaconeceras is a deeply umbliciate, involute haploceratacean ammonite from the Lower Cretaceous included in the oppeliid subfamily Aconeceratinae. The shell of Protaconeceras has a crunulate keel, especially in the youth. Sides are slightly convex and are covered with flexious striae or flattened ribs that extend onto the ventral surface. Sutural elements are wider and shallower than in Aconeceras. The stratigraphic range is confined to the Hauterivian.
