= Haploceras =

Haploceras Temporal range: Kimmeridgian–Tithonian

Scientific classification
- Kingdom: Animalia
- Phylum: Mollusca
- Class: Cephalopoda
- Subclass: †Ammonoidea
- Order: †Ammonitida
- Family: †Haploceratidae
- Genus: †Haploceras; Zittel, 1870

Species
- See text

Genus of molluscs (fossil)

Haploceras is a genus of late Upper Jurassic (Kimmeridgian and Tithonian) ammonoid cephalopods and the type for the Haploceratidae, similar to Lissoceras but with a broader whorl section and small blunt lappets and a blunt rostrum; some species with feeble ventral folds on body chamber.

== Distribution ==
Jurassic deposites in North America, Africa, Europe and the mid east.
