= Binneyitidae =

Binneyitidae Temporal range: Late Cenomanian to early Santonian

Scientific classification
- Kingdom: Animalia
- Phylum: Mollusca
- Class: Cephalopoda
- Subclass: †Ammonoidea
- Order: †Ammonitida
- Superfamily: †Haploceratoidea
- Family: †Binneyitidae; Reeside, 1927

Genera
- see text

Family of molluscs (fossil)

Binneyitidae is a family of Upper Cretaceous ammonoid cephalopods characterized by rather small, compressed, flat sided shells and sutures that tend to have deep, narrow, simple elements with parallel sides, that range from the upper Cenomanian into the lower Santonian.

Three genera are included, as follows.

Borrisjakoceras Arkangelski 1916 - Shells moderately evolute to rather involute, venter bluntly trapezoidal to rounded. Stratigraphic range: U Cenomanian - L Turonian. Found in Kansas, Montana, and Turkmenistan.
Binneyites Reeside, 1917 - Shells very involute, venter flat. Ventrolateral ornament stronger than on Borrisjakoceras. First found in the Coniacean of Wyoming. Range known from middle Turronian to the lower Santonian.
Johnsonites Cobban 1961 - Type and only known species is Johsonites sulcatus.

Binneyitidae, according to C.W. Wright et al., 1996, is now regarded as belonging to the Haploceratoidea. Originally the Binneyitidae was included in the Acanthoceratoidea based on the possibility of descent from a compressed acanthoceratid such as Protacanthoceras.
