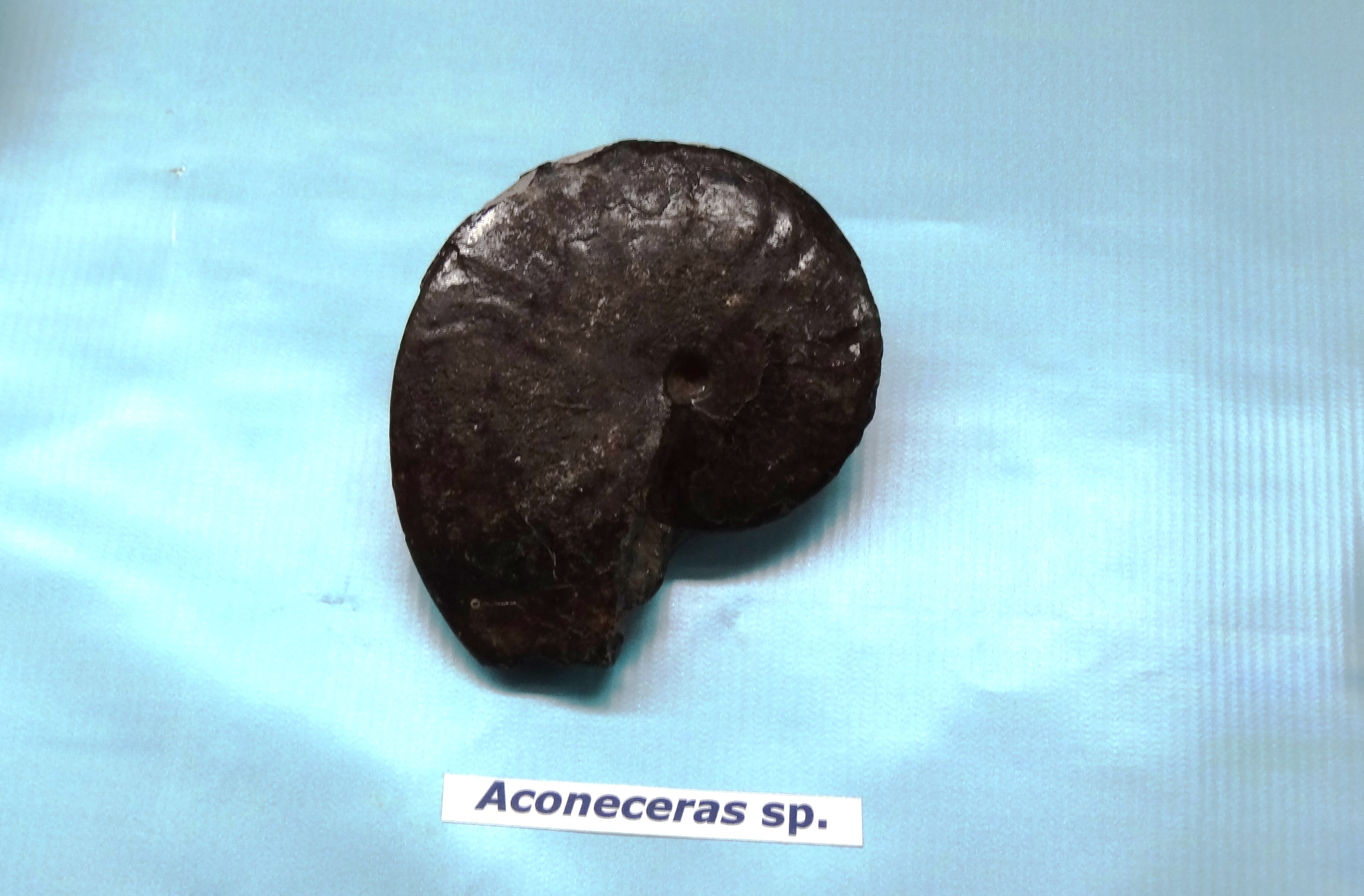

Scientific classification
- Kingdom: Animalia
- Phylum: Mollusca
- Class: Cephalopoda
- Subclass: †Ammonoidea
- Order: †Ammonitida
- Family: †Oppeliidae
- Subfamily: †Aconeceratinae
- Genus: †Aconeceras

= Aconeceras =

Aconeceras Temporal range: Lower Cretaceous

Genus of molluscs (fossil)

Aconeceras is an early Cretaceous ammonite included in the oppeliid subfamily Aconeceratidae, characterized by an involute, high-whorled, flat-sided shell that bears a finely serrate keel along the venter. Sutures have narrower and deeper elements than in Protaconeceras. Aconeceras has been found in western Europe, South Africa, and eastern Australia. Its stratigraphic range is from the Upper Barramian to the Lower Albian.
