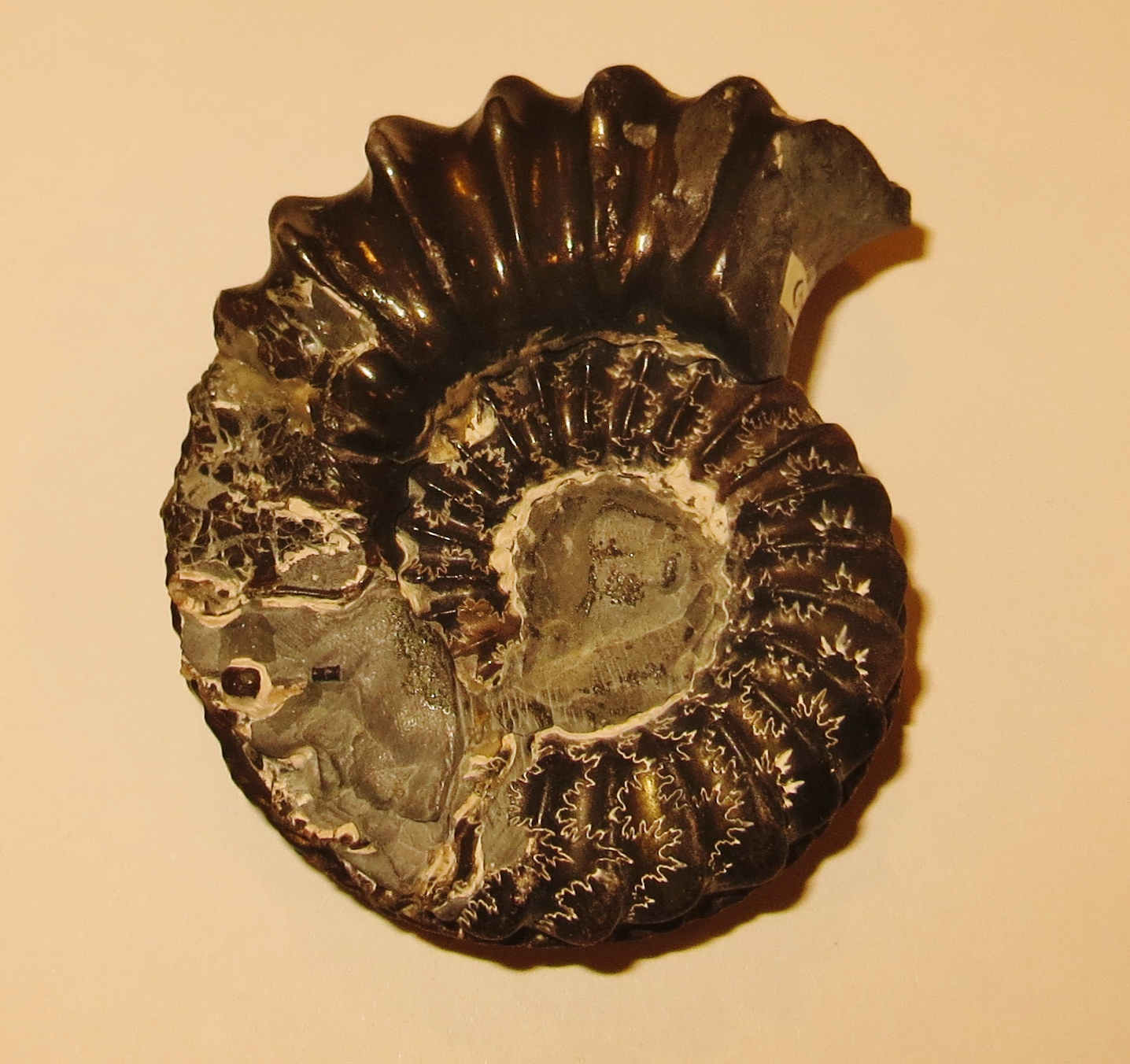
- H. hecticum

Scientific classification
- Kingdom: Animalia
- Phylum: Mollusca
- Class: Cephalopoda
- Subclass: †Ammonoidea
- Order: †Ammonitida
- Family: †Oppeliidae
- Subfamily: †Hecticoceratinae
- Genus: †Hecticoceras; Bonarelli, 1893

Subgenera
- See text

= Hecticoceras =

Hecticoceras Temporal range: Callovian

Genus of molluscs (fossil)

Hecticoceras is an ammonite genus belonging to the haploceratoid family Oppeliidae, that lived during the Middle and Late Jurassic, from the Callovian. Hecticoceras may be seen as a series of some nine subgenera, beginning with the lower Callovian H. (Hecticoceras) and H. (Hecticoceratoides) and ending with the lower Oxfordian H. (Pseudobrightia) and H. (Eochetoceras). Hecticoceras sensu lato and Prohecticoceras from the underlying Bathonian form the oppeliid subfamily, Hecticoceratinae.

Hecticoceras, including its various subgenera, have a widespread distribution and have been found in the late Middle and early Upper Jurassic of Europe, North Africa, Somalia, India, Madagascar, and possibly Japan.

== Subgenera ==
- Hecticoceras (Hecticoceras)
- Hecticoceras (Hecticoceratoides)
- Hecticoceras (Lunuloceras)
- Hecticoceras (Sublunuloceras)
- Hecticoceras (Kheraites)
- Hecticoceras (Putealiceras)
- Hecticoceras (Brightia)
- Hecticoceras (Pseudobrightia)
- Hecticoceras (Eochetoceras)

Hecticoceras (Orbignyiceras) is sometimes distinguished from H. (Sublunuloceras) although the two are generally considered equivalent. H. (Chanasia) may be a fourth subgenus from the lower Callovian.

== Descriptions ==
Hecticoceras (Hecticoceras) which lived toward the end of the Middle Jurassic, during the early Callovian, is characterized by an evolute shell with a single keel and strong, paired ribbing that arises at the edge of the umbilicus and ends in a row of ventrolateral submarginal tubercles. (Chanasia), considered another subgenus, is characterized by a rapidly expanding, compressed, evolute shell with low broad ribbing on the outer flanks.

Hecticoceras (Hecticoceroides), also from the lower Callovian, is like H. (Hecticoceras) except that it lacks a keel. H. (Lunuloceras), a third subgenus from the lower Callovian, has smooth inner whorls and sinuous ribbing on the outer whorls, but no tubercles.

Hecticoceras (Kheraites) and H. (Sublunuloceras) are both known from the middle Callovian; H. (Kheraites) just from that interval, H. (Sublunuloceras) into the lower Oxfordian (Upper Jurassic). (Kheraites) is strongly ribbed. (Sublunuloceras) has gentle sinuous ribbing and a single keel.

Hecticoceras (Putealiceras) and H. (Brightia) from the upper Callovian differ in the detail of their ribbing. Ribbing in (Putealiceras) is generally straight and radial, bifurcating about mid flank and meeting at a distinct median keel on the venter. (Brightia) has large nodes on the inner half the whorl sides, and concavely curved ribs on the outer half.

Hecticoceras (Pseudobrightia) from the lower Oxfordian is much like (Putealiceras) but tricarinate (three keeled). H. (Eochetoceras) from the same interval is stout whorled and unicarinate (single keeled), doubtfully distinct from (Putealiceras).
