= Uhligites =

Uhligites Temporal range: U Jura (Tith) - L Cret (Berr)

Scientific classification
- Kingdom: Animalia
- Phylum: Mollusca
- Class: Cephalopoda
- Subclass: †Ammonoidea
- Order: †Ammonitida
- Family: †Oppeliidae
- Subfamily: †Streblitinae
- Genus: †Uhligites; Kilian, 1913

Genus of molluscs (fossil)

Uhligites is an oppeliid ammonite included in the subfamily Streblitinae that lived during the latest part of the Jurassic and earliest Cretaceous; from about 150 to 140 m.y.a.

Uhligites has been found in uppermost Jurassic (Tithonian) sediments in China, India, New Zealand, and Yemen, and the Lower Cretaceous (Berriasian) sediments, also in Yemen, and in Antarctica.

Related genera include Streblites, Substreblites, and Cyrtosiceras.
