= Oecoptychius =

Oecoptychius Temporal range: Bajocian–Callovian

Scientific classification
- Kingdom: Animalia
- Phylum: Mollusca
- Class: Cephalopoda
- Subclass: †Ammonoidea
- Order: †Ammonitida
- Family: †Strigoceratidae
- Genus: †Oecoptychius

Genus of molluscs (fossil)

Oecoptychius is an extinct genus of fossil ammonite cephalopods. The species lived during the Middle Jurassic.

== Taxonomic position ==
Oecophtychius was named by Neumayr in 1878. It is placed into Oecoptychitidae, a family of dwarf ammonites established by Arkell, 1957, that is a part of the superfamily Stephanoceratoidea.

== Diagnosis ==
Oecoptychius is an eccentrically coiled, dwarf ammonite. Inner whorls smooth, spheroidal; outer whorls with fine biplicate ribbing, ventral groove, and an acute elbow at half a whorl before the aperture; peristome contracted, with outwardly directed lappets.

== Distribution ==
Fossils of the Oecophtychius species have been found in Jurassic sediments of France, Germany and Madagascar.
