= Hebetoxyites =

Hebetoxyites Temporal range: Bajocian

Scientific classification
- Kingdom: Animalia
- Phylum: Mollusca
- Class: Cephalopoda
- Subclass: †Ammonoidea
- Order: †Ammonitida
- Family: †Strigoceratidae
- Genus: †Hebetoxyites; Buckman, 1924

Extinct genus of molluscs

Hebetoxyites is a genus of ammonoid cephalopod from the middle part of the Bajocian stage, middle Jurassic, included in the Strigoceratidae, Haploceratoidea. The shell is oxyconic, with a sharp rim but no keel, and involute, with the inner whorls hidden. The umbilicus is very small. Sides have a spiral ridge but are not striate.
