= Glochiceras =

Glochiceras Temporal range: Oxfordian–Kimmeridgian

Scientific classification
- Kingdom: Animalia
- Phylum: Mollusca
- Class: Cephalopoda
- Subclass: †Ammonoidea
- Order: †Ammonitida
- Family: †Haploceratidae
- Genus: †Glochiceras; Hyatt, 1900

Species
- See text

Genus of molluscs (fossil)

Glochiceras is a haploceratid ammonite characterized by a small, smooth, compressed, evolute shells with large lappets and a median lateral groove. Its geographic distribution is fairly cosmopolitan, but it is limited stratigraphically to the Oxfordian and Kimmeridgian stages in the Upper Jurassic.

The earlier, Bajocian, Cadomoceras is similar overall, except for having a large ventral rostrum and spatulate lappets at the aperture, and coarse ventral plications.
