= Mazapilitinae =

Mazapilitinae Temporal range: Kimmeridgian

Scientific classification
- Kingdom: Animalia
- Phylum: Mollusca
- Class: Cephalopoda
- Subclass: †Ammonoidea
- Order: †Ammonitida
- Family: †Oppeliidae
- Subfamily: †Mazapilitinae; Spath, 1928

Genera
- See text

Extinct subfamily of ammonites

Mazapilitinae is a subfamily of Upper Jurassic ammonites included in the Oppeliidae. Shells are involute; venter rounded or gently tabulate; ribbing coarse, fold-like, branching.

Genera include Mazapilites, Submazapilites, and Eurynoticeras, which have been found in Kimmeridgian age marine sediments in southern Europe and Mexico.
