= Haploceratidae =

Haploceratidae Temporal range: U Jurassic - L Cretaceous

Scientific classification
- Kingdom: Animalia
- Phylum: Mollusca
- Class: Cephalopoda
- Subclass: †Ammonoidea
- Order: †Ammonitida
- Superfamily: †Haploceratoidea
- Family: †Haploceratidae; Zittel, 1884

Genera
- Cadomoceras Munier-Chalmas, 1892; Haploceras Zittel, 1870; Hildoglochiceras Spath, 1924; Lissoceras Bayle, 1879; Neolissoceras Spath, 1923; Pseudolissoceras Spath, 1925

Extinct family of molluscs

Haploceras (Neolissoceras) desmaceratoides

The Haploceratidae is the type family of the Haploceratoidea, a superfamily in the ammonitina; which according to Donovan et al. (1981) can be derived from the Taramelliceratinae, a subfamily of the Oppeliidae.

Haploceratids, (Haploceratidae) are typically small, smooth and somewhat featureless ammonites, as described by Arkell et al, without ribbing or ventral keels and moderately undifferentiated sutures; that range from the Late Kimmeridgian to the Hauterivian, crossing from the Jurassic into the Cretaceous.
