= Neolissoceras =

Neolissoceras Temporal range: Tithonian–Hauterivian

Scientific classification
- Kingdom: Animalia
- Phylum: Mollusca
- Class: Cephalopoda
- Subclass: †Ammonoidea
- Order: †Ammonitida
- Family: †Haploceratidae
- Genus: †Neolissoceras

Species
- Neolissoceras desmoceratoides Wiedmann, 1966; Neolissoceras grasianus d'Orbigny, 1841

Genus of molluscs (fossil)

Neolissoceras is a genus of haploceratid ammonites with a smooth, compressed, flat-sided shell with a flatly rounded venter and distinct umbilical margin, from the Upper Jurassic (Tithonian) - Lower Cretaceous (Hauterivian) of southern Europe, Madagascar, and India.
