= Oppeliinae =

Oppeliinae Temporal range:

Scientific classification
- Kingdom: Animalia
- Phylum: Mollusca
- Class: Cephalopoda
- Subclass: †Ammonoidea
- Order: †Ammonitida
- Family: †Oppeliidae
- Subfamily: †Oppeliinae; Bonarelli, 1894

Genera
- See text

Extinct subfamily of ammonites

Oppeliinae is a subfamily within the Oppeliidae family of Jurassic ammonites. These ammonites are characterized by their predominantly oxyconic forms, compressed with sharp venters in adults and keeled inner whorls. The sutures are complex, consisting of a long series of evenly graded lobes and saddles with finely frilled endings.

Oppeliinae gave rise to the Hecticoceratinae during the early Bathonian stage, near the middle of their range, and to the Taramelliceratinae during the late Callovian. The Taramelliceratinae, in turn, gave rise to the Streblitinae in the early Kimmeridgian and to the Haploceratidae in the late Kimmeridgian.

Oppeliinae has a worldwide distribution dating back to the Middle Jurassic, with the exception of Boreal regions.

== List of genera ==
The Oppeliinae includes the following genera, listed in order of appearance.

Bradfordia
Oppelia
Oxycerites
Paralcidia
Strugia
Trimargina
Magharina
Oecostraustes
Stregoxites
