= Oecotraustes =

Oecotraustes Temporal range: Bajocian–Callovian

Scientific classification
- Kingdom: Animalia
- Phylum: Mollusca
- Class: Cephalopoda
- Subclass: †Ammonoidea
- Order: †Ammonitida
- Family: †Oppeliidae
- Genus: †Oecotraustes; Waagen, 1869

Oecotraustes is an extinct cephalopod genus included in the ammonid family Oppeliidae and named by Wilhelm Waagen in 1869. Species in the genus lived during the Middle Jurassic.

== Description ==
The shell of Oecotraustes is evolute, the outer whorl only moderately embracing the inner whorls, laterally compressed whorl height greater than width. Outer flanks and venter ribbed, ribs sinuous.

== Distribution ==
Fossils of Oecotraustes species have been found in Jurassic sediments of Germany, India, Madagascar, Spain, and the United States.

== Other sources ==
- W.J. Arkell et al., 1957. Mesozoic Ammonoidea; Treatise on Invertebrate Paleontology, Part L, Ammonoidea. Geological Society of America.
