= Cadomoceras =

Cadomoceras Temporal range: Bajocian

Scientific classification
- Kingdom: Animalia
- Phylum: Mollusca
- Class: Cephalopoda
- Subclass: †Ammonoidea
- Order: †Ammonitida
- Family: †Haploceratidae
- Genus: †Cadomoceras; Munier-Chalmas, 1892

Extinct genus of cephalopods

Cadomoceras is an extinct cephalopod genus from the order Ammonitida that lived during the Bajocian Stage of the Middle Jurassic, approximately 178 to 175 million years ago.

Cadamoceras has smooth inner whorls but the outer has course plications on the outer (ventral) flanks and across the venter. The aperture has a large scoop-like rostrum and spatulate lappets flanking either side. The suture is straight with small, widely separated lobes.

Cadamoceras, named by Munier-Chalmas in 1892, is a member of the ammonitid family Haploceratidae which is part of the superfamily Haplocerataceae.
