= Hecticoceratinae =

Hecticoceratinae Temporal range: Bathonain - Oxfordian

Scientific classification
- Kingdom: Animalia
- Phylum: Mollusca
- Class: Cephalopoda
- Subclass: †Ammonoidea
- Order: †Ammonitida
- Family: †Oppeliidae
- Subfamily: †Hecticoceratinae; Spath. 1925

Genera
- See text

Extinct subfamily of molluscs

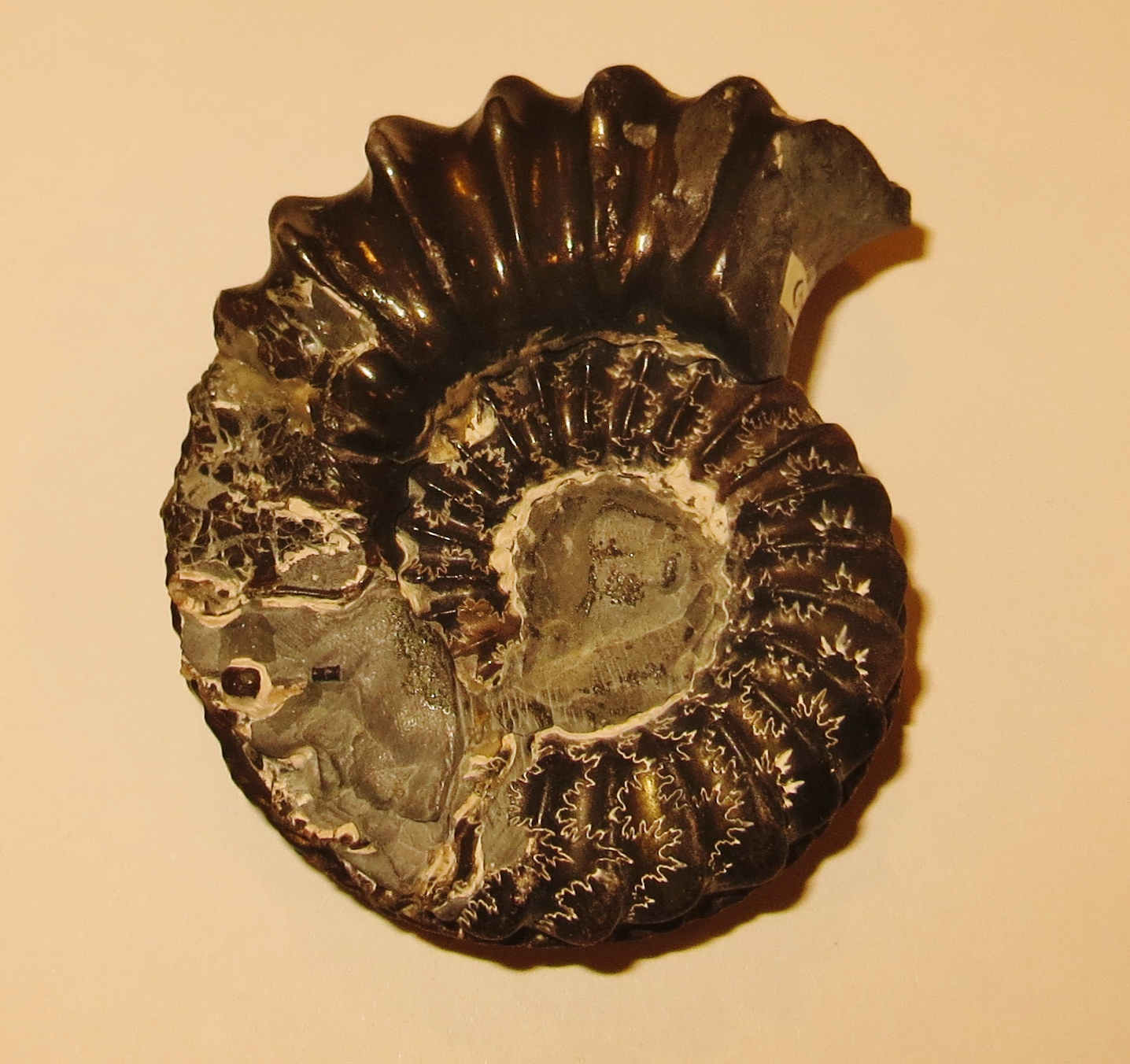
Hecticoceras hecticum fossil

Hecticoceratinae is a subfamily of oppeliids from the Middle and Upper Jurassic typically with strong falcoid or falcate ribbing that covers whorl sides completely. Venters are usually keeled and may be tricarinate.

The Hecticocerainae, which has its origin in the Oppeliinae, give rise to the Distichoceratinae near the beginning of the Middle Jurassic Callovian, and to the Glochiceratinae early in the Upper Jurassic Oxfordian. Neither apparently gave rise to any subsequent groups.

== Genera ==
Hecticoceras, Brightia, Eochetoceras, Hecticoceratoides, Lunuloceras, Kheraites, Proheticoceras, Pseudobrightia, and Pseudobrightia, listed as separate genera in the Treatise are regarded as subgenera of Hecticoceras
