= Lissoceras =

Lissoceras Temporal range: Bajocian–Bathonian

Scientific classification
- Kingdom: Animalia
- Phylum: Mollusca
- Class: Cephalopoda
- Subclass: †Ammonoidea
- Order: †Ammonitida
- Family: †Haploceratidae
- Genus: †Lissoceras

Species
- See text

Genus of molluscs (fossil)

Lissoceras is an involute, smoothly or finely vetrolaterally ribbed ammonite with a blunt, un-keeled venter included in the Haploceratidaefamily that lived from the Lower Bajocian to Middle Oxfordian (Middle to Upper Jurassic) ages in what is now Europe, south Asia, and southern Alaska.

Lissoceratoides, once considered to be a subgenus of Lissoceras, is indistinguishable morphologically from it.
