= Streblitinae =

Streblitinae Temporal range: Late Jurassic- Early Cretaceous

Scientific classification
- Kingdom: Animalia
- Phylum: Mollusca
- Class: Cephalopoda
- Subclass: †Ammonoidea
- Order: †Ammonitida
- Family: †Oppeliidae
- Subfamily: †Streblitinae; Spath, 1925

Genera
- Bornhardticeras; Creniceras; Cyrtosiceras; Gymnodiscoceras; Neochetoceras; Oxylenticeras; Semiformiceras; Streblites; Substreblites; Uhligites

Extinct subfamily of ammonites

Streblitinae is a subfamily of Upper Jurassic and Lower Cretaceous ammonites within the family Oppeliidae characterized by compressed, involute shells; typically oxycones with complex sutures. Includes Streblites, Pseudoppelia, and Substreblites. Derivation is from the Taramelliceratinae. May have given rise to the Aconiceratinade.
