= Strigoceratidae =

Strigoceratidae Temporal range: Aalenian-Oxfordian

Scientific classification
- Kingdom: Animalia
- Phylum: Mollusca
- Class: Cephalopoda
- Subclass: †Ammonoidea
- Order: †Ammonitida
- Superfamily: †Haploceratoidea
- Family: †Strigoceratidae; Buckman, 1924

Genera
- Hebetoxyites; Phlycticeras; Praestrigites; Strigoceras

Extinct family of molluscs

The Strigoceratidae is a family in the ammonitid superfamily Haploceratoidea, restricted to the lower Middle Jurassic, Bajocian stage, possibly derived from the Hammitoceratidae. The family was established and named by Buckman in 1924.

== Description ==
The shells of the Strigoceratidae are compressed to oxyconic, with a narrow or minute umbilicus and simple or irregularly branched ribbing almost confined to the outer (ventral) half of the whorl sides. The sutures are moderately simple to complex, with a long umbilical lobe bearing a graded series of Auxiliaries.
