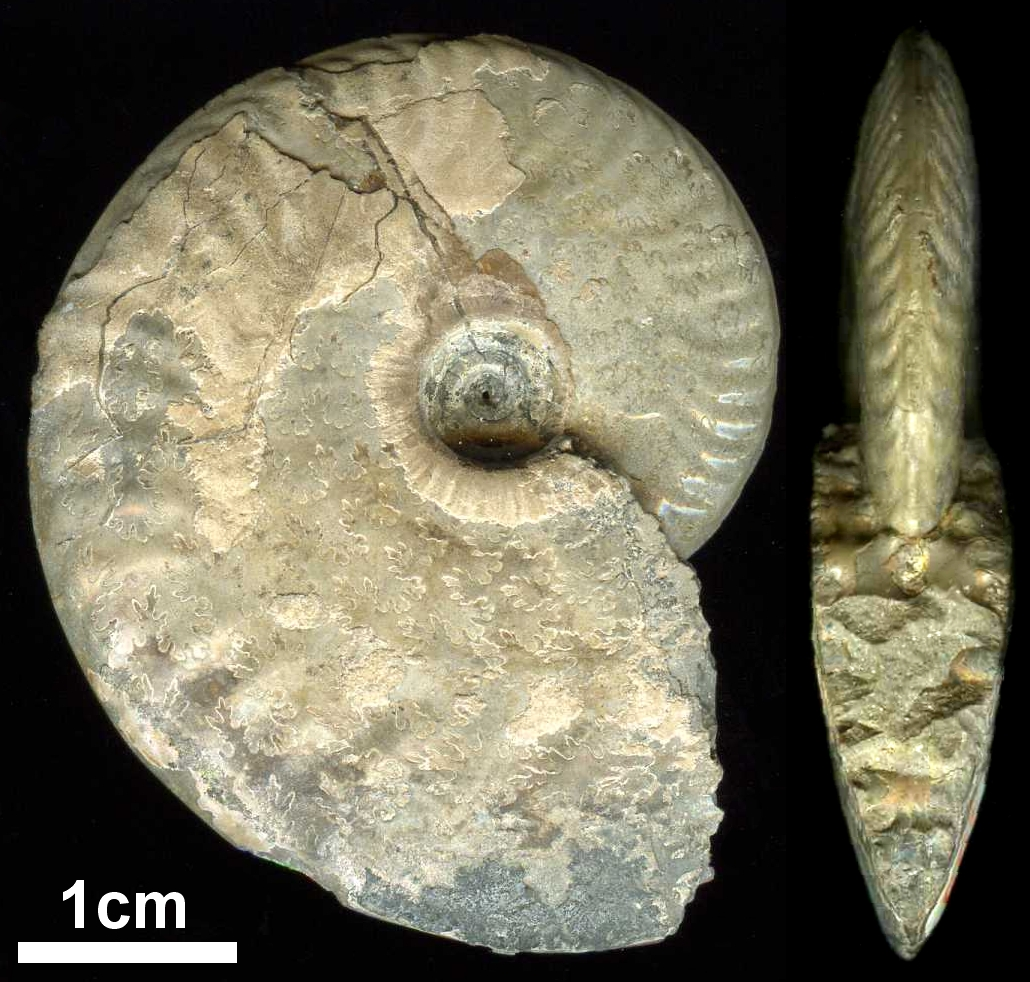
- Oxycerites sp.

Scientific classification
- Kingdom: Animalia
- Phylum: Mollusca
- Class: Cephalopoda
- Subclass: †Ammonoidea
- Order: †Ammonitida
- Superfamily: †Haploceratoidea
- Family: †Oppeliidae; Bonarelli, 1894

Subfamilies
- See text

= Oppeliidae =

Oppeliidae Temporal range: Bajocian - Cenomanian

Extinct family of molluscs

Oppeliidae are compressed to oxyconic, sculptured Haploceratoidea, either unkeeled, unicarinate, bicarinate, or tricarinate; with sutures in great variety, but ribbing usually more or less falcoid or falcate. The Oppeliidae is the principal family of the Haploceratoidea, with the longest duration, extending from the Middle Jurassic (Bajocian) to the Upper Cretaceous (Cenomanian) Their derivation is from the Hildoceratoidea.

== Subfamilies ==
Nine subfamilies are recognized, the first eight of which are included in the earlier Treatise, Part L. They are the:

Oppeliinae
Hecticoceratinae
Distchoceratinae
Teramelliceratinae
Phlycticeratinae
Streblitinae
Mazapilitinae
Aconeceratinae
Binneyitinae

The Binneyitinae was added by Donovan et al, 1981, transferred from the Stephanoceratoidea.
