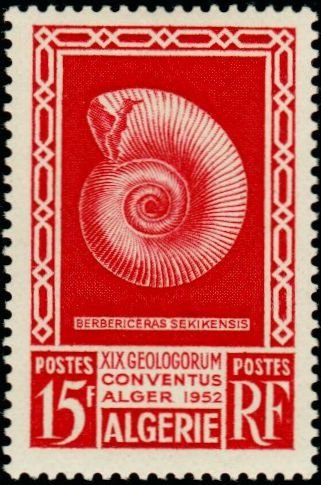

Scientific classification
- Kingdom: Animalia
- Phylum: Mollusca
- Class: Cephalopoda
- Subclass: †Ammonoidea
- Genus: †Berbericeras

Species
- None cataloged

= Berbericeras =

Berbericeras Temporal range: Bathonian

Genus of molluscs (fossil)

Berbericeras is an extinct genus of cephalopod in the subclass Ammonoidea.
