= Binatisphinctes =

Binatisphinctes Temporal range: Callovian

Scientific classification
- Kingdom: Animalia
- Phylum: Mollusca
- Class: Cephalopoda
- Subclass: †Ammonoidea
- Genus: †Binatisphinctes; Buckmann 1921

Subgenera
- B. (Binatisphinctes); B. (Okaites)

Extinct genus of ammonites

Binatisphinctes is an extinct genus of cephalopod belonging to the Ammonite subclass.

== Distribution ==
Jurassic of France, Germany, India, Madagascar and Russia.
