= Zugokosmoceras =

Scientific classification
- Kingdom: Animalia
- Phylum: Mollusca
- Class: Cephalopoda
- Subclass: †Ammonoidea
- Genus: †Zugokosmoceras

Genus of molluscs (fossil)

Zugokosmoceras is an extinct genus of cephalopods belonging to the Ammonite subclass.

There are two known species of Zugokosmoceras, these are Zugokosmoceras obductum and Zugokosmoceras jason Specimens found were in Switzerland and France. Zugokosmoceras was from the Jurassic Period.
