= Rasenoides =

Rasenoides Temporal range: Kimmeridgian–Kimmeridgian

Scientific classification
- Kingdom: Animalia
- Phylum: Mollusca
- Class: Cephalopoda
- Subclass: Ammonoidea
- Order: Ammonitida
- Genus: Rasenoides

Lower Jurassic ammonite

Rasenoides is a flat sided, evolute, radially ribbed Lower Jurassic ammonite belonging to the ammonitida.

== Distribution ==
Russian and Switzerland
