= Praeparkinsonia =

Praeparkinsonia Temporal range: Aalenian–Bajocian

Scientific classification
- Kingdom: Animalia
- Phylum: Mollusca
- Class: Cephalopoda
- Subclass: †Ammonoidea
- Genus: †Praeparkinsonia

Praeparkinsonia is an extinct genus from a well-known class of fossil cephalopods, the ammonites. It lived during the Jurassic Period.

== Distribution ==
None cataloged.
