= Berrosiceras =

Berrosiceras Temporal range: Turonian

Scientific classification
- Kingdom: Animalia
- Phylum: Mollusca
- Class: Cephalopoda
- Subclass: †Ammonoidea
- Genus: †Berrosiceras

Species
- None cataloged

Berrosiceras is an extinct genus of ammonite belonging to the subclass Ammonoidea. It is known from the Turonian, specifically the Upper Turonian, of the Late Cretaceous.
