= Anavirgatites =

Anavirgatites Temporal range: Kimmeridgian–Tithonian

Scientific classification
- Domain: Eukaryota
- Kingdom: Animalia
- Phylum: Mollusca
- Class: Cephalopoda
- Subclass: †Ammonoidea
- Genus: †Anavirgatites; Spath, 1925

Extinct genus of cephalopods

Anavirgatites is an extinct genus of cephalopod belonging to the Ammonite subclass.
