= Almohadites =

Almohadites Temporal range: Barremian

Scientific classification
- Domain: Eukaryota
- Kingdom: Animalia
- Phylum: Mollusca
- Class: Cephalopoda
- Subclass: †Ammonoidea
- Order: †Ammonitida
- Genus: †Almohadites; Wiedmann, 1966

Extinct genus of cephalopod

Almohadites is an extinct genus of cephalopod belonging to the ammonite subclass.
