= Riasanites =

Riasanites Temporal range: Tithonian–Berriasian

Scientific classification
- Kingdom: Animalia
- Phylum: Mollusca
- Class: Cephalopoda
- Subclass: †Ammonoidea
- Order: †Ammonitida
- Genus: †Riasanites

Genus of ammonite

Riasanites is an Upper Jurassic ammonite belonging to the ammonitid.

== Distribution ==
Poland, USSR and Yemen
