= Padragosiceras =

Padragosiceras Temporal range: Aalenian–Bajocian

Scientific classification
- Kingdom: Animalia
- Phylum: Mollusca
- Class: Cephalopoda
- Subclass: †Ammonoidea
- Genus: †Padragosiceras

Padragosiceras is an extinct genus from a well-known class of fossil cephalopods, the ammonites. It lived during the Middle Jurassic.

== Distribution ==
None Cataloged
