= Asphinctites =

Asphinctites Temporal range: Bajocian–Bathonian

Scientific classification
- Kingdom: Animalia
- Phylum: Mollusca
- Class: Cephalopoda
- Subclass: †Ammonoidea
- Order: †Ammonitida
- Family: †Morphoceratidae
- Genus: †Asphinctites; Buckman, 1924

Asphinctites is an extinct genus of cephalopod belonging to the ammonite subclass.
