= Zealandites =

Zealandites Temporal range: Cretaceous

Scientific classification
- Kingdom: Animalia
- Phylum: Mollusca
- Class: Cephalopoda
- Subclass: †Ammonoidea
- Genus: †Zealandites

Zealandites is an extinct genus of ammonite cephalopod that lived during the Cretaceous. Various fossils are found in Cretaceous marine strata in North America, New Zealand, East Asia, and Antarctica
