= Bauchioceras =

Bauchioceras Temporal range: Turonian

Scientific classification
- Kingdom: Animalia
- Phylum: Mollusca
- Class: Cephalopoda
- Subclass: †Ammonoidea
- Genus: †Bauchioceras

Species
- B. tricarinatum

Bauchioceras is an extinct genus of cephalopod belonging to the Ammonite subclass.

== Distribution ==
Cretaceous of Nigeria
