= Bayleites =

Bayleites Temporal range: Santonian–Campanian

Scientific classification
- Domain: Eukaryota
- Kingdom: Animalia
- Phylum: Mollusca
- Class: Cephalopoda
- Subclass: †Ammonoidea
- Genus: †Bayleites

Species
- None cataloged

Extinct genus of ammonites

Bayleites is an extinct genus of cephalopod belonging to the Ammonite subclass.
