= Baskaniiceras =

Baskaniiceras Temporal range: Cenomanian

Scientific classification
- Kingdom: Animalia
- Phylum: Mollusca
- Class: Cephalopoda
- Subclass: †Ammonoidea
- Genus: †Baskaniiceras

Species
- B. deshayesitoides; B. smithi

Baskaniiceras is an extinct genus of cephalopod belonging to the Ammonite subclass.
