= Yokoyamaceras =

Conservation status
- Extinct

Scientific classification
- Domain: Eukaryota
- Kingdom: Animalia
- Phylum: Mollusca
- Class: Cephalopoda
- Subclass: †Ammonoidea
- Genus: †Yokoyamaceras

Genus of molluscs (fossil)

Yokoyamaceras is an extinct genus of cephalopod belonging to the Ammonite subclass.
