= Billcobbanoceras =

Billcobbanoceras Temporal range: Santonian

Scientific classification
- Kingdom: Animalia
- Phylum: Mollusca
- Class: Cephalopoda
- Subclass: †Ammonoidea
- Genus: †Billcobbanoceras

Species
- None cataloged

Billcobbanoceras is an extinct genus of cephalopod belonging to the Ammonite subclass.
