= Arisphinctes =

Arisphinctes Temporal range: Oxfordian

Scientific classification
- Kingdom: Animalia
- Phylum: Mollusca
- Class: Cephalopoda
- Subclass: †Ammonoidea
- Genus: †Arisphinctes; Buckman, 1924

Arisphinctes is an extinct genus of cephalopod belonging to the Ammonite subclass.
