= Rakusites =

Rakusites Temporal range: Toarcian–Toarcian

Scientific classification
- Kingdom: Animalia
- Phylum: Mollusca
- Class: Cephalopoda
- Subclass: †Ammonoidea
- Order: †Ammonitida
- Genus: †Rakusites

Rakusites Upper Jurassic ammonite belonging to the ammonitida family.
