= Alfeldites =

Alfeldites Temporal range: Bajocian

Scientific classification
- Kingdom: Animalia
- Phylum: Mollusca
- Class: Cephalopoda
- Subclass: †Ammonoidea
- Genus: †Alfeldites; Westermann, 1975

Alfeldites is an extinct genus of cephalopod belonging to the Ammonite subclass.
