= Zuluiceras =

Scientific classification
- Kingdom: Animalia
- Phylum: Mollusca
- Class: Cephalopoda
- Subclass: †Ammonoidea
- Genus: †Zuluiceras van Hoepen, 1965

Genus of molluscs (fossil)

Zuluiceras is an extinct genus of cephalopods belonging to the Ammonite subclass.
