= Andersonites =

Andersonites Temporal range: Coniacian

Scientific classification
- Kingdom: Animalia
- Phylum: Mollusca
- Class: Cephalopoda
- Subclass: †Ammonoidea
- Genus: †Andersonites; Van Hoepen, 1965

Andersonites is an extinct genus of cephalopod belonging to the Ammonite subclass.
