= Amphipoanoceras =

Scientific classification
- Kingdom: Animalia
- Phylum: Mollusca
- Class: Cephalopoda
- Subclass: †Ammonoidea
- Genus: †Amphipoanoceras

Genus of molluscs (fossil)

Amphipoanoceras is an extinct genus of cephalopod belonging to the Ammonite subclass.
