= Betyokites =

Betyokites Temporal range: Turonian

Scientific classification
- Kingdom: Animalia
- Phylum: Mollusca
- Class: Cephalopoda
- Subclass: †Ammonoidea
- Genus: †Betyokites

Species
- None ataloged

Betyokites is an extinct genus of cephalopod belonging to the Ammonite subclass.
