= Argosirenites =

Scientific classification
- Kingdom: Animalia
- Phylum: Mollusca
- Class: Cephalopoda
- Subclass: †Ammonoidea
- Genus: †Argosirenites

Genus of molluscs (fossil)

Argosirenites is an extinct genus of cephalopods belonging to the Ammonite subclass.
