= Zuercherella =

Scientific classification
- Kingdom: Animalia
- Phylum: Mollusca
- Class: Cephalopoda
- Subclass: †Ammonoidea
- Genus: †Zuercherella

Genus of molluscs (fossil)

Zuercherella is an extinct genus of cephalopods belonging to the Ammonite subclass.
