= Zenoites =

Scientific classification
- Kingdom: Animalia
- Phylum: Mollusca
- Class: Cephalopoda
- Subclass: †Ammonoidea
- Genus: †Zenoites

Genus of molluscs (fossil)

Zenoites is an extinct genus of cephalopods belonging to the Ammonite subclass.
