= Teleoconch =

Adult shell of molluscs

In malacology, the teleoconch is the portion of a gastropod shell that is formed after the larval stage.

It represents the "adult" shell, as opposed to the protoconch, which is the embryonic or larval shell.

== The transition: The varix or discontinuity ==
The point where the protoconch ends and the teleoconch begins is often marked by a distinct line or a change in sculpture. This is known as the nepionic line.

In some species, this transition is abrupt, showing a sudden change from a smooth larval shell to a heavily ribbed adult shell. In others, the transition is gradual, making it harder to define the exact boundary without a microscope.

This abrupt transition is typical for many marine gastropods, particularly those with a planktotrophic (plankton-feeding) larval stage. These larvae spend a long time in the open ocean before settling on the sea floor, leading to a dramatic shift in environmental needs that is reflected in the shell's architecture.

The "abruptness" is usually a biological marker of metamorphosis. It represents the exact day (or even hour) the snail settled out of the plankton and began its life as a bottom-dweller. In malacology, we call this the nepionic transition.

Here are a few notable groups and species where this "sudden change" is particularly striking:

- The family Muricidae (rock snails and Murex)

Many species in this family exhibit a glassy, smooth protoconch that ends abruptly at a thickened ridge (varix). Immediately after this line, the teleoconch begins with heavy axial ribs or spines. The larva needs a smooth, light shell to stay buoyant and escape predators in the water column; the adult needs a heavy, armored shell to survive on the rocky seabed.

  - Example: Murex trapa or Bolinus brandaris.

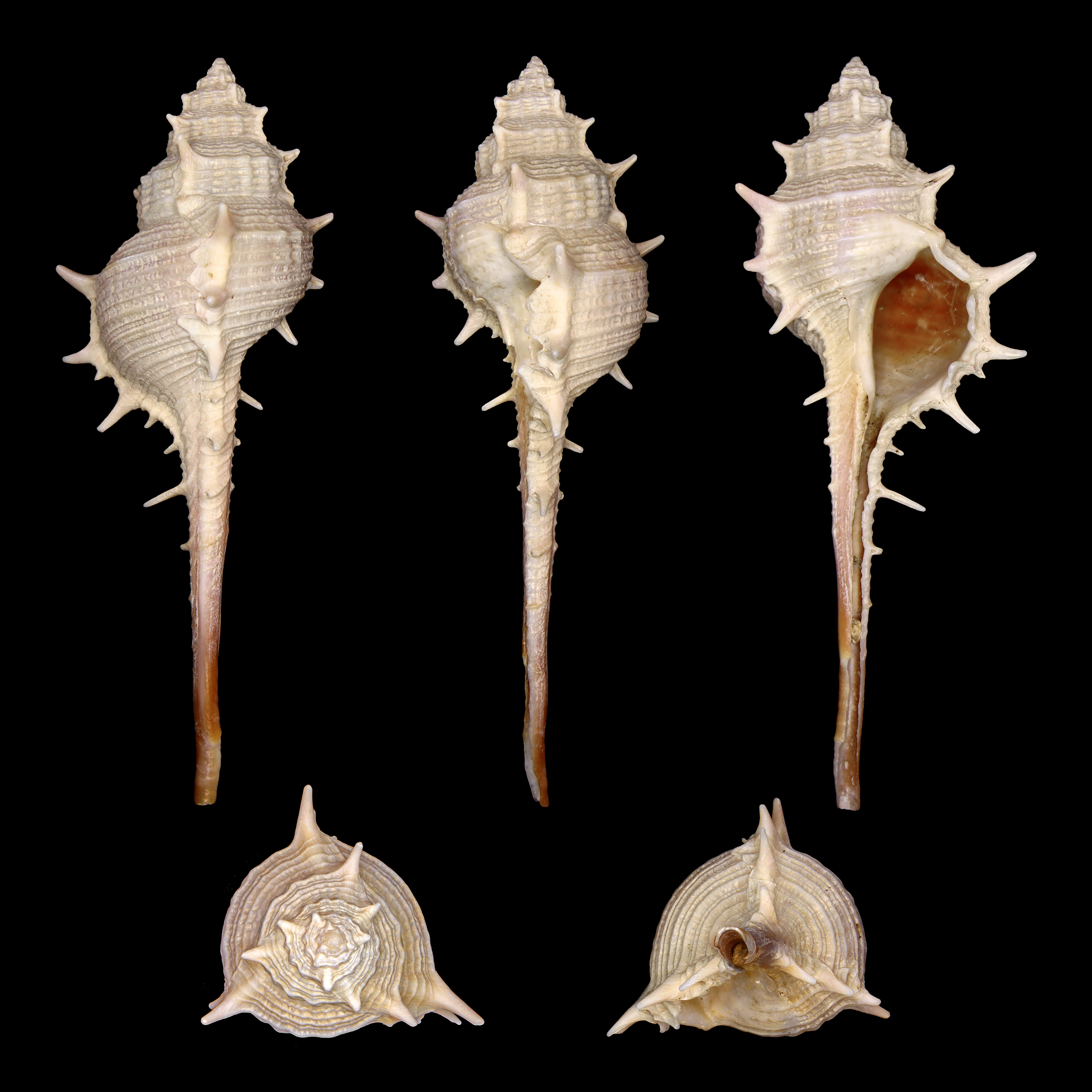
Shell of Murex trapa

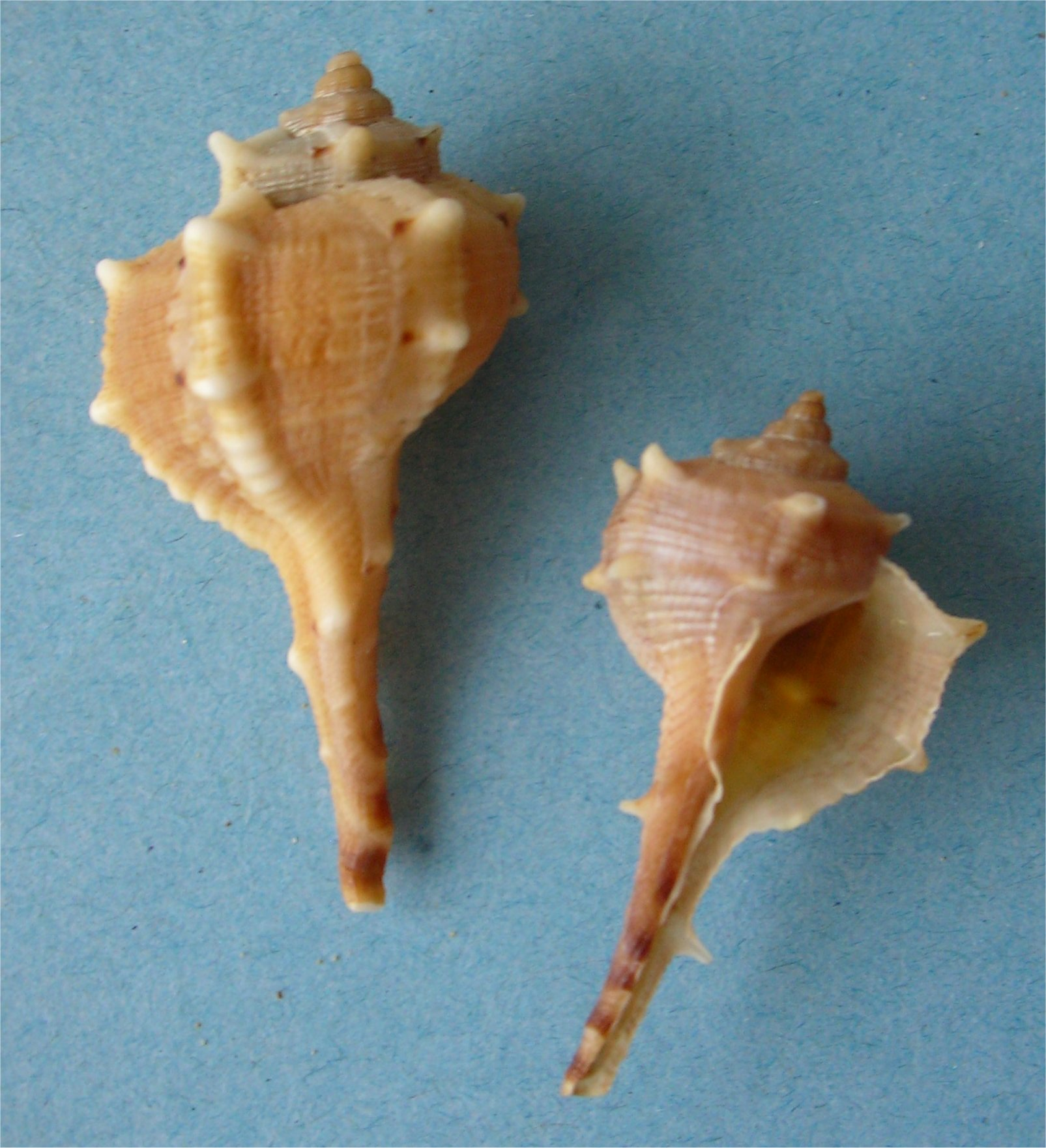
Shell of Bolinus brandaris

- The family Turridae and Conidae (turrids and cone snails)

These predatory snails often have very distinct "boundary lines." The shift marks the moment the snail transitions from a swimming larva to a venomous, sand-dwelling hunter.

  - Example: Conus species often show a tiny, multi-whorled, smooth protoconch that sits like a small button on top of a wide, flat-topped, or coronated (crowned) teleoconch.

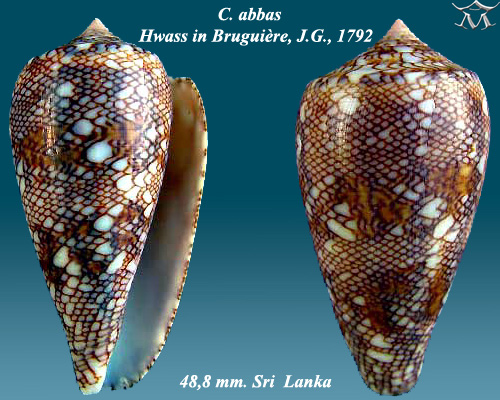
Shell of Conus abbas

- The family Epitoniidae (wentletraps)

Wentletraps are famous for their "costae" (prominent, blade-like ribs). The protoconch is typically small, smooth, and dark-colored. The moment the teleoconch begins, the shell turns snow-white and begins producing its signature high-standing, circular ribs.

  - Example: Epitonium scalare (The Precious Wentletrap).

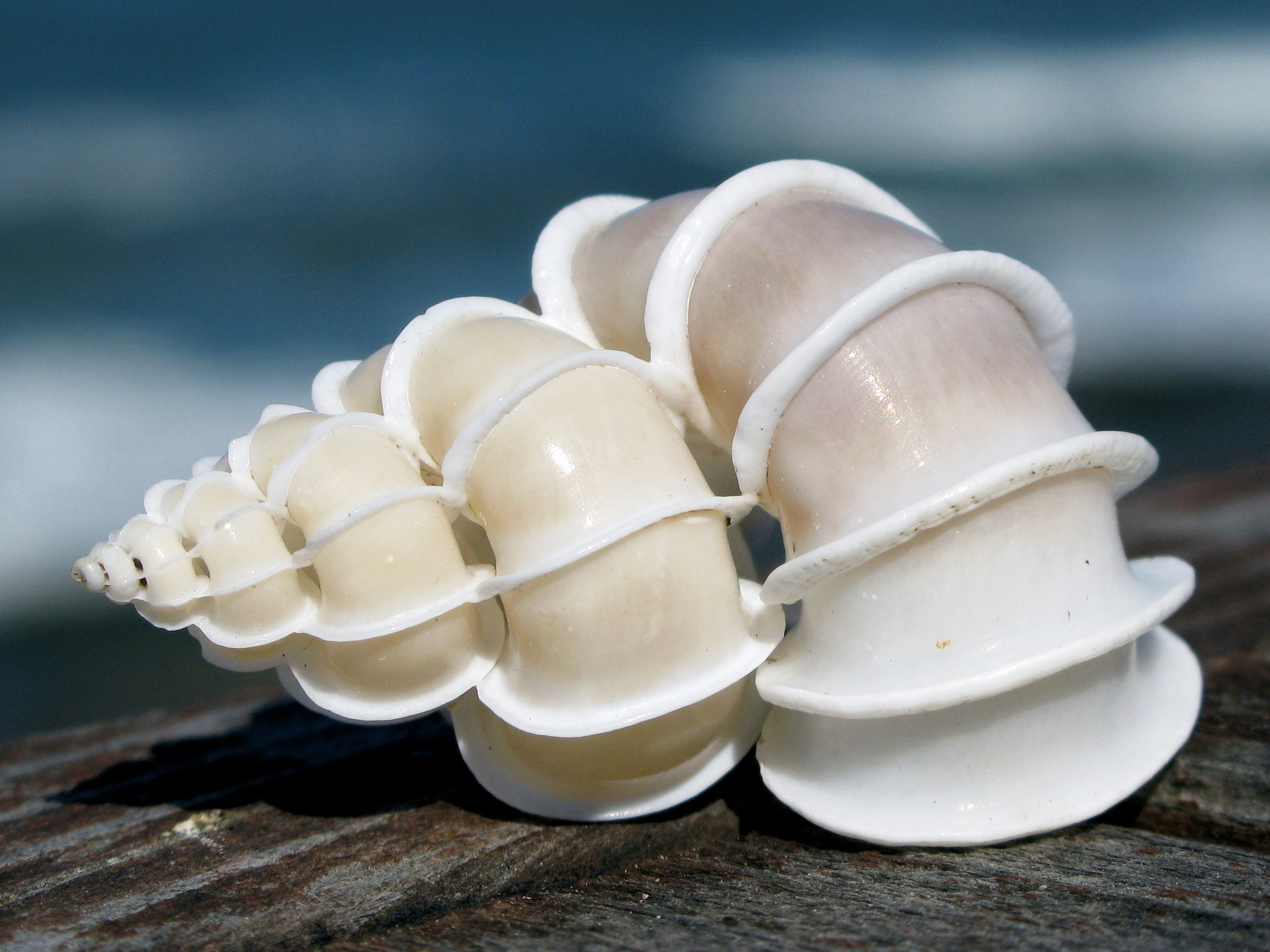
Shell of Epitonium scalare

- The family Architectonicidae (sundial shells)

These shells show a bizarre transition called heterostrophy. This describes the condition where the shell whorls coil in one direction during one portion of a gastropod’s life, and in the other direction for another portion. The larval shell in this family is actually coiled in the opposite direction or at a different angle than the adult shell. When the teleoconch starts, the snail effectively "flips" its growth axis, leaving a tiny, inverted nub at the center of the umbilical side or apex.

  - Example: Architectonica perspectiva.

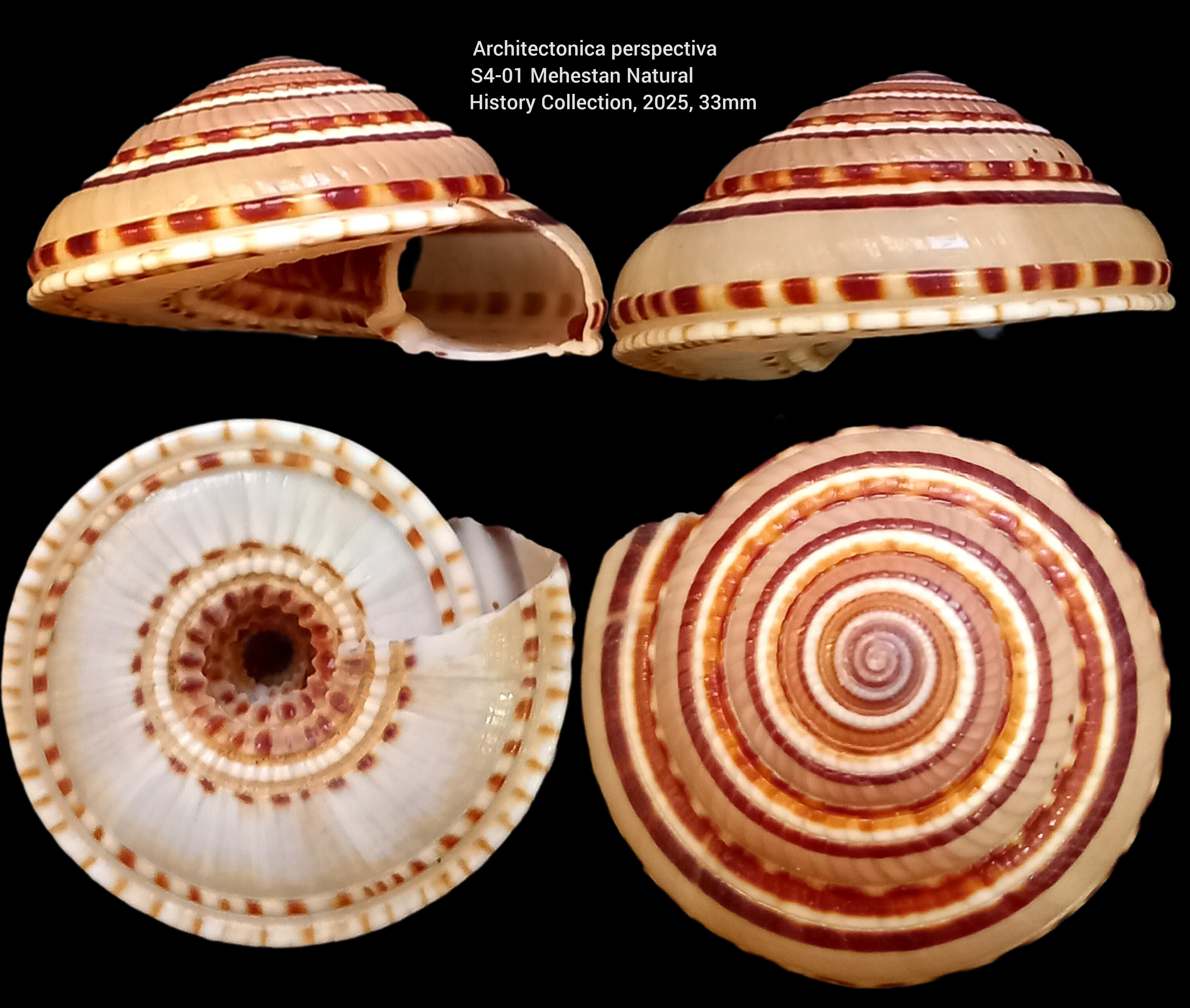
Shell of Architectonica perspectiva

== Characteristics of the teleoconch ==
While the protoconch is usually simple and conservative (often used by scientists to identify families), the teleoconch is where the species' unique personality comes out.

Teleoconch coiling is solely the result of differential growth. The offset of the protoconch on the teleoconch is variable.

Its features include:

- Sculpture: This is where you find the primary cords, ribs, spines, and granules. These patterns often change as the snail grows (ontogeny).
- Whorl expansion: The teleoconch defines the rate at which the shell coils and expands. A "high-spired" shell has a teleoconch that grows more vertically than horizontally.
- Coloration: unlike the often translucent or plain protoconch, the teleoconch contains the pigments and patterns (streaks, bands, spots) used for camouflage or signaling.
- Aperture development: the final shape of the "mouth" (aperture), including the outer lip (peristome) and any teeth (denticles) or folds (plicae), is a feature of the teleoconch.

== Biological significance ==
The teleoconch records the life history of the individual, because snails secrete their shells sequentially

- Growth Lines: these are microscopic "tree rings" on the teleoconch that indicate periods of fast growth or environmental stress.
- Repair Marks: if a crab tried to break the shell and failed, the teleoconch will show a "scar" where the mantle repaired the damage.

== Identification and taxonomy ==
For collectors and scientists, the number of teleoconch whorls is a vital measurement. For example, the count usually includes both the protoconch and the teleoconch. Distinguishing between the two is crucial for identifying cryptic species that might look identical as adults but have completely different larval shells.

When reading a formal description, one often sees phrases like: "Teleoconch consisting of 3.5 whorls with prominent radial ribs..." This tells the researcher to ignore the very tip of the shell (the protoconch) when counting whorls or measuring the strength of the sculpture.

== See also ==
- Taxonomy of the Gastropoda (Bouchet & Rocroi, 2005)
