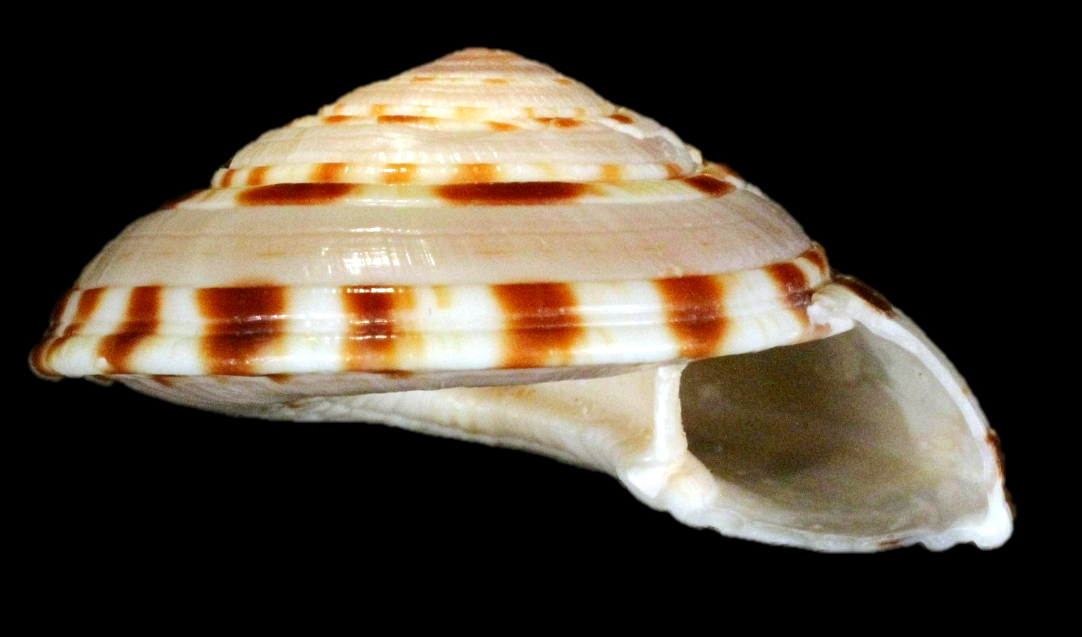
- Shell of Architectonica stellata (specimen at Naturalis Biodiversity Center)

Scientific classification
- Kingdom: Animalia
- Phylum: Mollusca
- Class: Gastropoda
- Family: Architectonicidae
- Genus: Architectonica
- Species: A. stellata

Binomial name
- Architectonica stellata (R. A. Philippi, 1849)

Synonyms
- Solarium abyssorum Melvill & Standen, 1903 junior subjective synonym; Solarium stellatum R. A. Philippi, 1849 superseded combination

= Architectonica stellata =

Species of gastropod

Architectonica stellata is a species of sea snail, a marine gastropod mollusk in the family Architectonicidae, which are known as the staircase shells or sundials.

== Description ==
The height of the shell attains 3 mm, its diameter 6 mm.

(Original description in Latin) The shell is depressed-conical. It is entirely, even on the base, radiately grooved (sulcate). It is whitish with a few rusty spots at the suture and at the margin (each spot bridges two adjacent girdles). The sutures are narrowly channeled. The whorls are two-grooved (bisulcate). The two lowest girdles are broad and nearly equal, divided by a narrow, smooth groove. The umbilicus equals two-thirds of the body whorl and is encircled by medium rusty crenations.

(Described as Solarium abyssorum in Latin) The shell is small, very depressed, and most acutely keeled. It is deeply umbilicated, thin, and whitish. There are four whorls; the apical 1½ whorls are swollen, very smooth, and glassy (hyaline). The remaining whorls are narrowly channeled at the sutures. Above, they are spirally ridged (lirate) near the sutures as well as below, with the interstices on both sides closely beaded (gemmulate). The middle surface is then shining and irregularly, longitudinally, and obliquely striated.The last whorl is acutely keeled around the periphery, and the keel is flat-margined on both sides. Below, towards the base, it is spirally single-ridged, after which the intermediate surface is longitudinally rudely-crenated. Around the umbilicus itself, it is furnished with two rows of beads. The umbilicus is beautifully scalar. The aperture is trigonal, and the lip is thin, not covering the umbilicus at all.

== Distribution ==
This marinespecies can be found off Oman, Malaysia and Vietnam.
