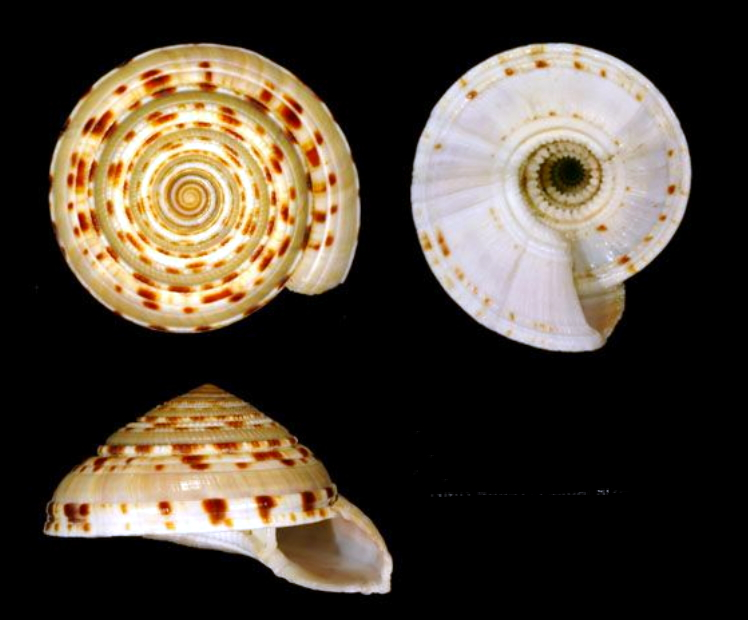
- Shell of Architectonica taylori (specimen at the Natural History Museum, Rotterdam)

Scientific classification
- Kingdom: Animalia
- Phylum: Mollusca
- Class: Gastropoda
- Family: Architectonicidae
- Genus: Architectonica
- Species: A. taylori

Binomial name
- Architectonica taylori (Hanley, 1862)

Synonyms
- Solarium taylori Hanley, 1862

= Architectonica taylori =

Species of gastropod

Architectonica taylori is a species of sea snail, a marine gastropod mollusk in the family Architectonicidae, which are known as the staircase shells or sundials.

== Description ==
The diameter of the shell attains 43 mm.

(Original description in Latin) The shell is depressed-conical, solid, and tawny. The suture is broadly channeled. The whorls are articulately painted in 4 brownish-red girdles (except for the third, which nearly equals the preceding two). They are broken up into rhombuses, which are much broader than high, by radiating grooves (which are rough and somewhat remote on the body whorl). The whorls are excellently divided by rather broad grooves (especially the third one).

The double girdles of the periphery are nearly equal and similarly painted, with an unsculptured interval between them that is equally broad and slightly exceeds the width of the preceding groove. The middle part of the basal area is ornamented only by very small brown spots near the inner margin, being more or less smooth elsewhere. The groove nearest the obtuse keel is rather broad and not thread-like. The girdle between the broad grooves neighboring the umbilicus is conspicuously narrow. The crenations of the rather narrow umbilicus are quite large and flesh-reddish.

== Distribution ==
This marine species can be found off East Asia and Southeast Asia (Japan, China, Vietnam, Indonesia, Brunei, Sri Lanka)
