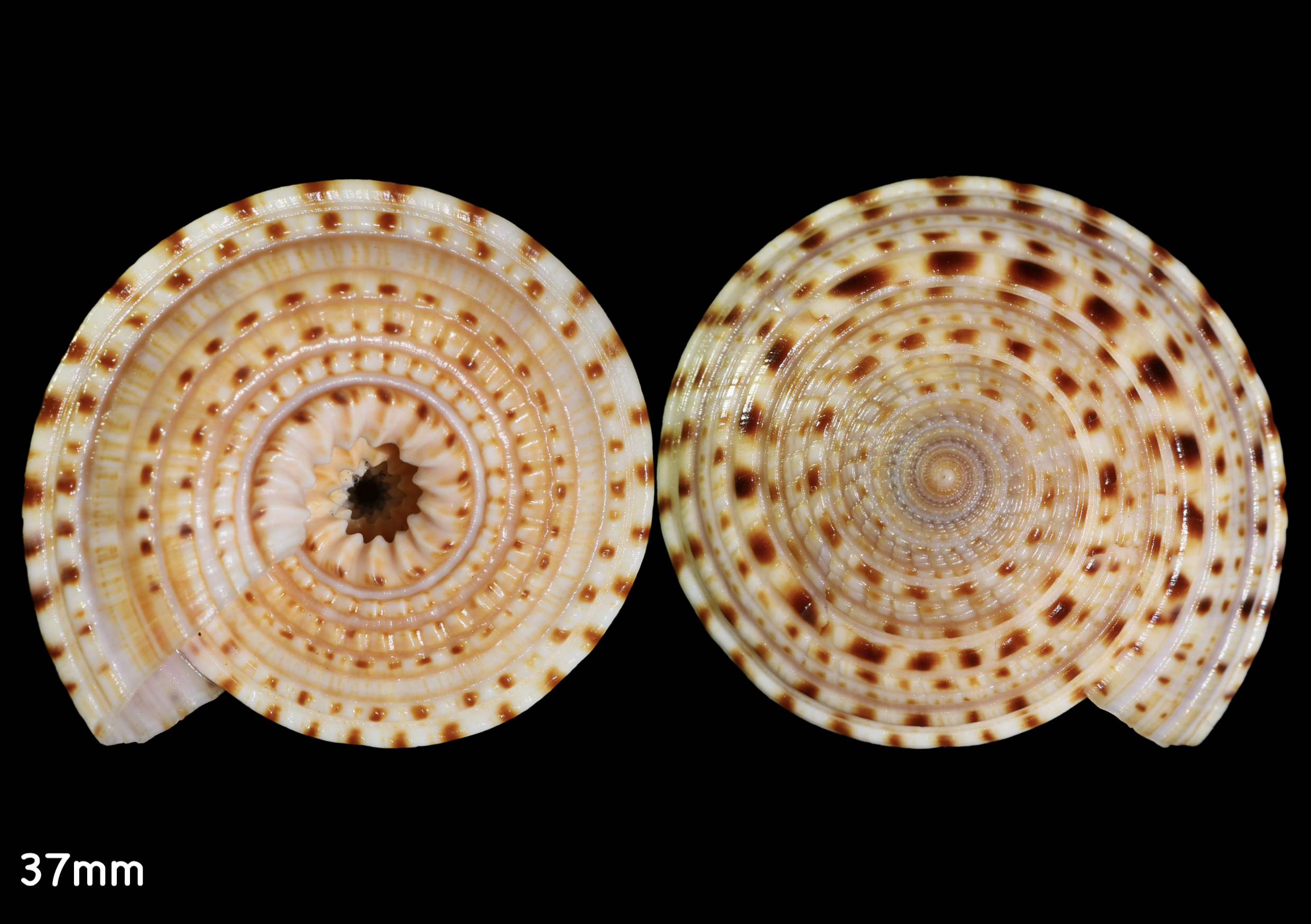
- Shell of Architectonica nobilis

Scientific classification
- Kingdom: Animalia
- Phylum: Mollusca
- Class: Gastropoda
- Family: Architectonicidae
- Genus: Architectonica
- Species: A. nobilis

Binomial name
- Architectonica nobilis Röding, 1798

Synonyms
- Architectonica granulata (Lamarck, 1816) junior subjective synonym; † Architectonica sexlinearis (E. T. Nelson, 1870) junior subjective synonym; Architectonica valenciennesii Mörch, 1859 junior subjective synonym; Architectonica wroblewskyi Mörch, 1875; Solarium granosum Valenciennes, 1832 junior subjective synonym; Solarium granulatum Lamarck, 1816; Solarium ordinarium E. A. Smith, 1890; Solarium quadriceps Hinds, 1844 junior subjective synonym; † Solarium sexlineare E. T. Nelson, 1870 junior subjective synonym; Solarium verrucosum R. A. Philippi, 1849 junior subjective synonym

= Architectonica nobilis =

Species of gastropod

Architectonica nobilis, common name the American sundial, is a species of sea snail, a marine gastropod mollusk in the family Architectonicidae, which are known as the staircase shells or sundials.

The subspecies Architectonica nobilis karsteni Rutsch, 1934: is a synonym of Architectonica karsteni Rutsch, 1934 (original rank).

== Description ==
Shell around 35-50 mm; spire convex-conical; approx. 8 flattened whorls, peripherally sharply to bluntly-padded keeled, suture shallow; aperture trapezoid; umbilicus wide, perspectival, margins of the whorls inside the umbilicus serrated; sculpture: upper part of the spire beaded, approx. 4 spiral rows of beads per whorl; shell creme colored, with numerous spiral bands of brown spots; operculum horny, brown.

(Original description of Solarium quadriceps in Latin) The shell is orbicular-discoidal. The numerous flattened whorls are girdled in four rows with various width. The cords are furnished with quadrate, flattened, and approximate tubercles. The lower cord is larger and is painted red along with the upper one. The shell is swollen at the base, and the median area is radiately folded. The umbilicus is wide-open and is encircled by large brown crenations. The narrow umbilical area is smooth.

(Original description of Solarium ordinarium in Latin) The shell is orbicular-conoidal, depressed, and moderately umbilicated. It is whitish or tinted with lilac, and punctated with red. There are 5 whorls, which are scarcely somewhat convex. They are girdled with five obliquely granose ridges. The body whorl is acutely angled at the periphery. It is generally lilaceous, concentrically grooved and girdled. The girdle around the umbilicus is the largest and strongly crenated, while the remaining girdles are also more or less crenulated or sub-quadrately granulated. The aperture is trapeziform and is bi-channeled at the columella.

== Distribution ==
This marine species has a wide distribution and can be found in sand and shallow waters off the coast of North, Central and South America and also off the coast of St. Helena, Cape Verdean Islands and Canary Islands.
