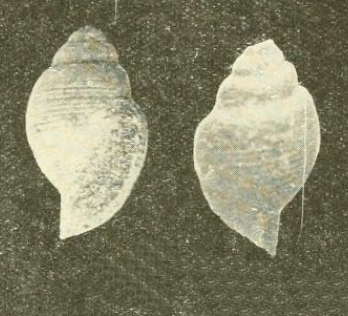
- Shell of † Acteon semispiralis (holotype)

Scientific classification
- Kingdom: Animalia
- Phylum: Mollusca
- Class: Gastropoda
- Superfamily: Acteonoidea
- Family: Acteonidae
- Genus: Acteon
- Species: †A. semispiralis

Binomial name
- †Acteon semispiralis P. Marshall, 1917

= Acteon semispiralis =

Extinct species of gastropods

Acteon semispiralis is an extinct species of sea snail, a marine gastropod mollusc in the family Acteonidae.

== Description ==
The length of the shell attains 10 mm, its diameter 5 mm.

(Original description) The shell is oval and small, The sculpture consists of well-formed spiral bands, 3 in number on the lower part of each whorl; on the body whorl these are 17 in number, but they are absent from the portion between the suture and the rounded shoulder of the whorl. The interstices are about the same width as the bands. No axial threads can be distinguished in the interstices. The spire is conical, less than half the height of the shell. The shell contains five whorls, each whorl distinctly angled above. The suture is deep and canaliculate. The aperture is narrowly oval. The columella shows a large fold near the top.

== Distribution ==
Fossils of this marine species have been found in Cretaceous strata near Wangaloa, New Zealand
