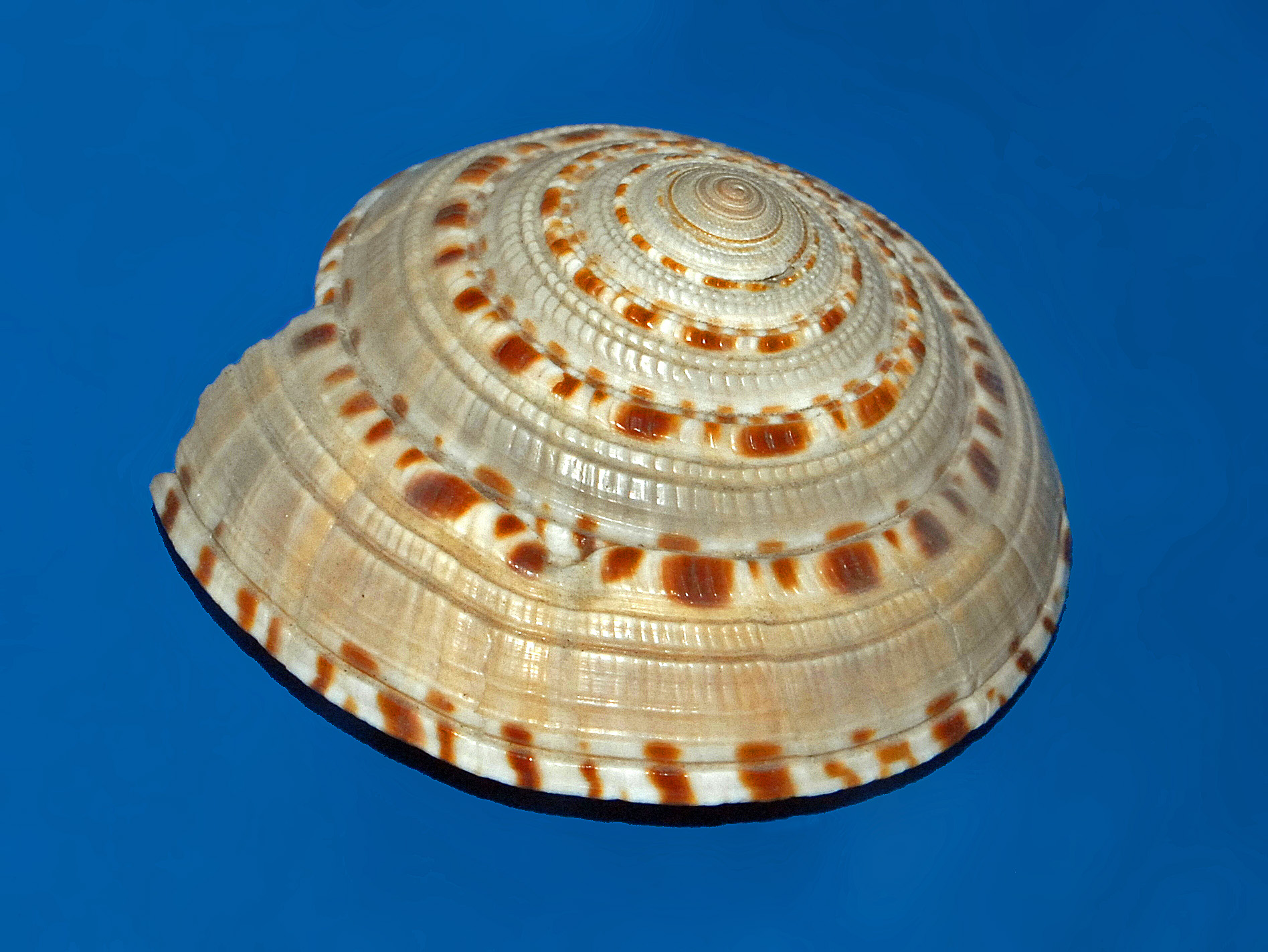
- Shell of Architectonica maxima from Japan at the Museo Civico di Storia Naturale di Milano

Scientific classification
- Kingdom: Animalia
- Phylum: Mollusca
- Class: Gastropoda
- Family: Architectonicidae
- Genus: Architectonica
- Species: A. maxima

Binomial name
- Architectonica maxima (Philippi, 1849)

Synonyms
- Solarium maximum Philippi, 1849

= Architectonica maxima =

Species of gastropod

Architectonica maxima, the giant sundial, is a species of sea snail, a marine gastropod mollusk in the family Architectonicidae, which are known as the staircase shells or sundials.

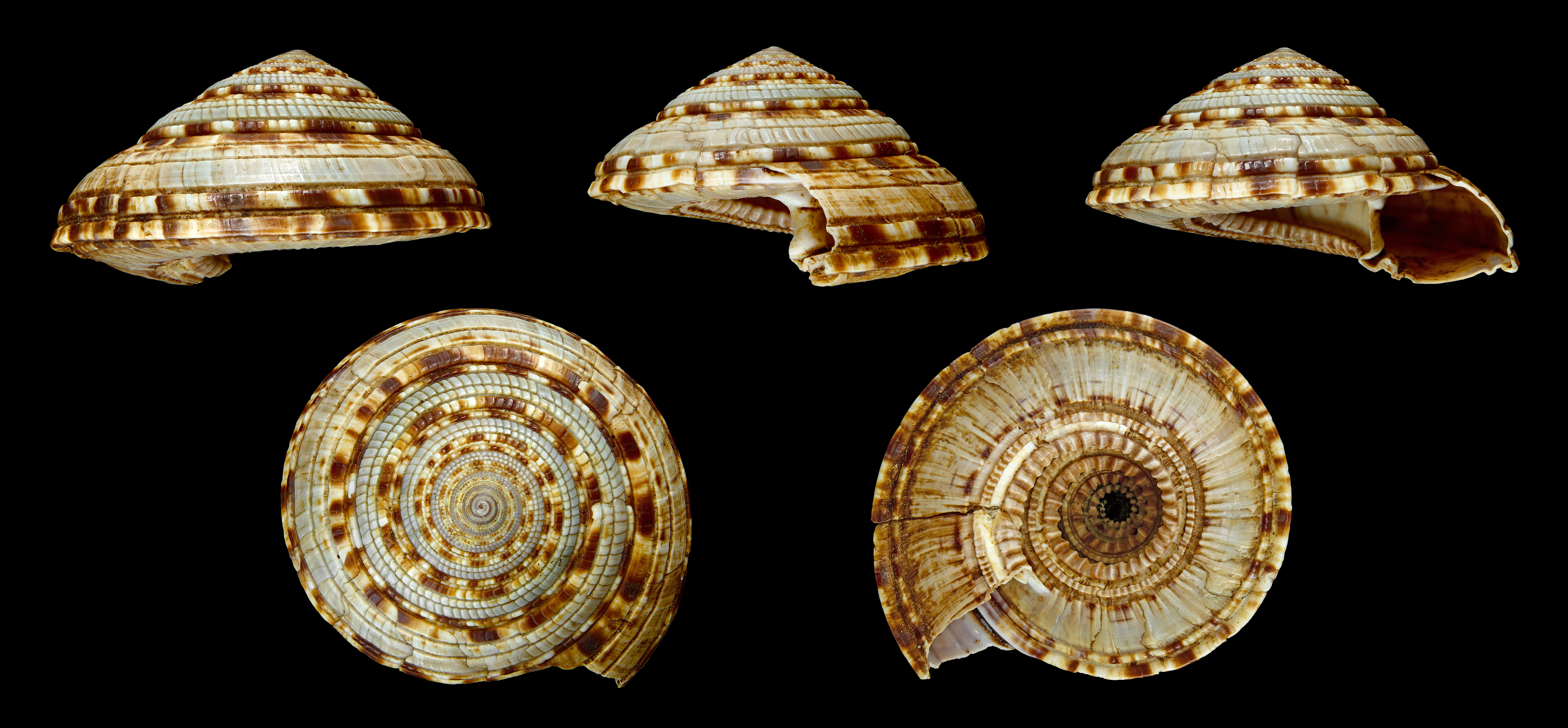
Shells of Architectonica maxima

== Description ==
Architectonica maxima has a shell that reaches 19–82 mm and it is the largest member of the sundial family. This shell is low-spired and quite flattened, with a beaded surface. The shoulder slope is divided into two ribs by a spiral groove. The basic color is cream, with brown spots.

(Original description in Latin) The low-conical shell is radiately grooved, at first slightly granular. It is grayish-tawny in color. The whorls show three grooves. The sutures are broadly channeled and bordered by a sutural band that is articulated with white and chestnut-brown markings. The band below the suture is unspotted and of the same color as the rest of the shell. The lowest band of the body whorl, and the broad band of the penultimate whorl are articulated with chestnut markings that equal in breadth the single-threaded space between them. The umbilicus occupies three-fourths of the diameter exceeding the body whorl, and is encircled by small whitish crenulations.

== Distribution ==
This species can be found in the Indo-Pacific, from East Africa and the Persian Gulf to western Pacific, Japan, eastern Australia, New Zealand, New Caledonia and Hawaii.

== Habitat ==
Giant sundial is a carnivore deeper water sea snail living on sandy patches and muddy sublittoral bottoms, close to soft corals, at a depth of 10 – 280 m.
