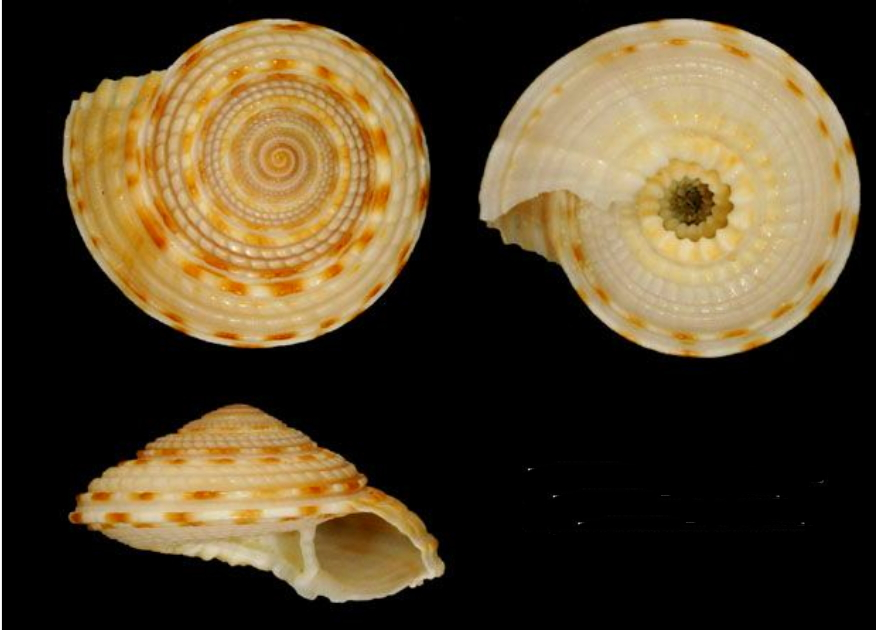
- Shell of Architectonica consobrina (specimen at the Natural History Museum Rotterdam)

Scientific classification
- Kingdom: Animalia
- Phylum: Mollusca
- Class: Gastropoda
- Family: Architectonicidae
- Genus: Architectonica
- Species: A. consobrina

Binomial name
- Architectonica consobrina Bieler, 1993

= Architectonica consobrina =

Species of gastropod

Architectonica consobrina is a species of sea snail, a marine gastropod mollusk in the family Architectonicidae, which are known as the staircase shells or sundials.

== Description ==
The diameter of the shell attains 25 mm.

== Distribution ==
This species can be found in the Philippines
