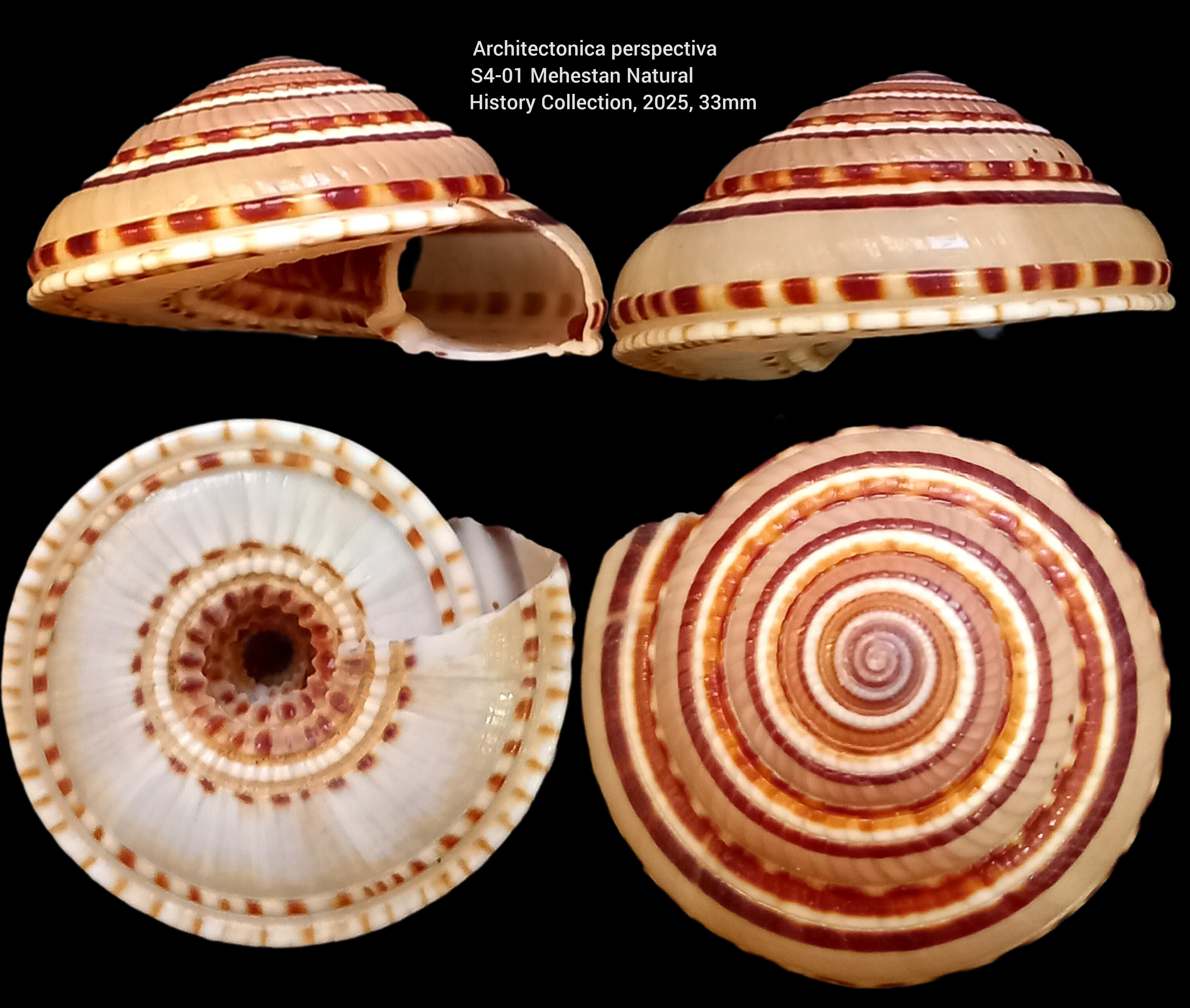
- shell Architectonica perspectiva

Scientific classification
- Kingdom: Animalia
- Phylum: Mollusca
- Class: Gastropoda
- Infraclass: "Lower Heterobranchia"
- Superfamily: Architectonicoidea
- Family: Architectonicidae
- Genus: Architectonica; Röding, 1798

Synonyms
- Solarium Lamarck, 1799 junior subjective synonym; Solarium (Architectonica) Röding, 1798 (Solarium is an objective synonym of Architectonica); Solarium (Solarium) Lamarck, 1799; Trochus (Solarium) Lamarck, 1799; Verticillus Jousseaume, 1888 (invalid; non Verticillus Moquin-Tandon, 1848)

= Architectonica =

Genus of gastropods

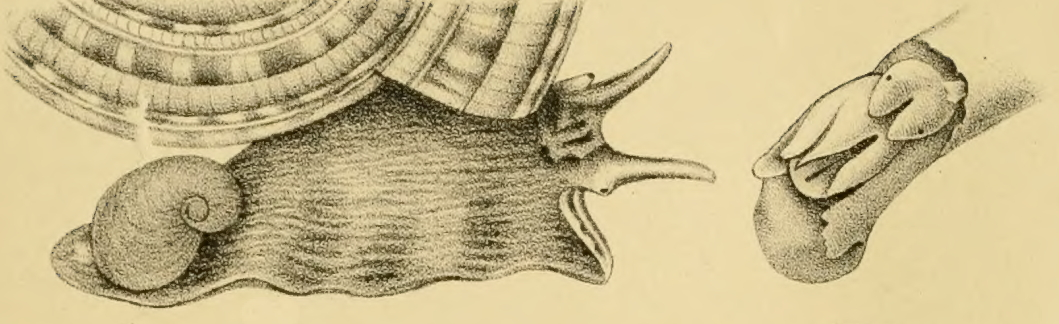
Drawing of the animal in Architectonida

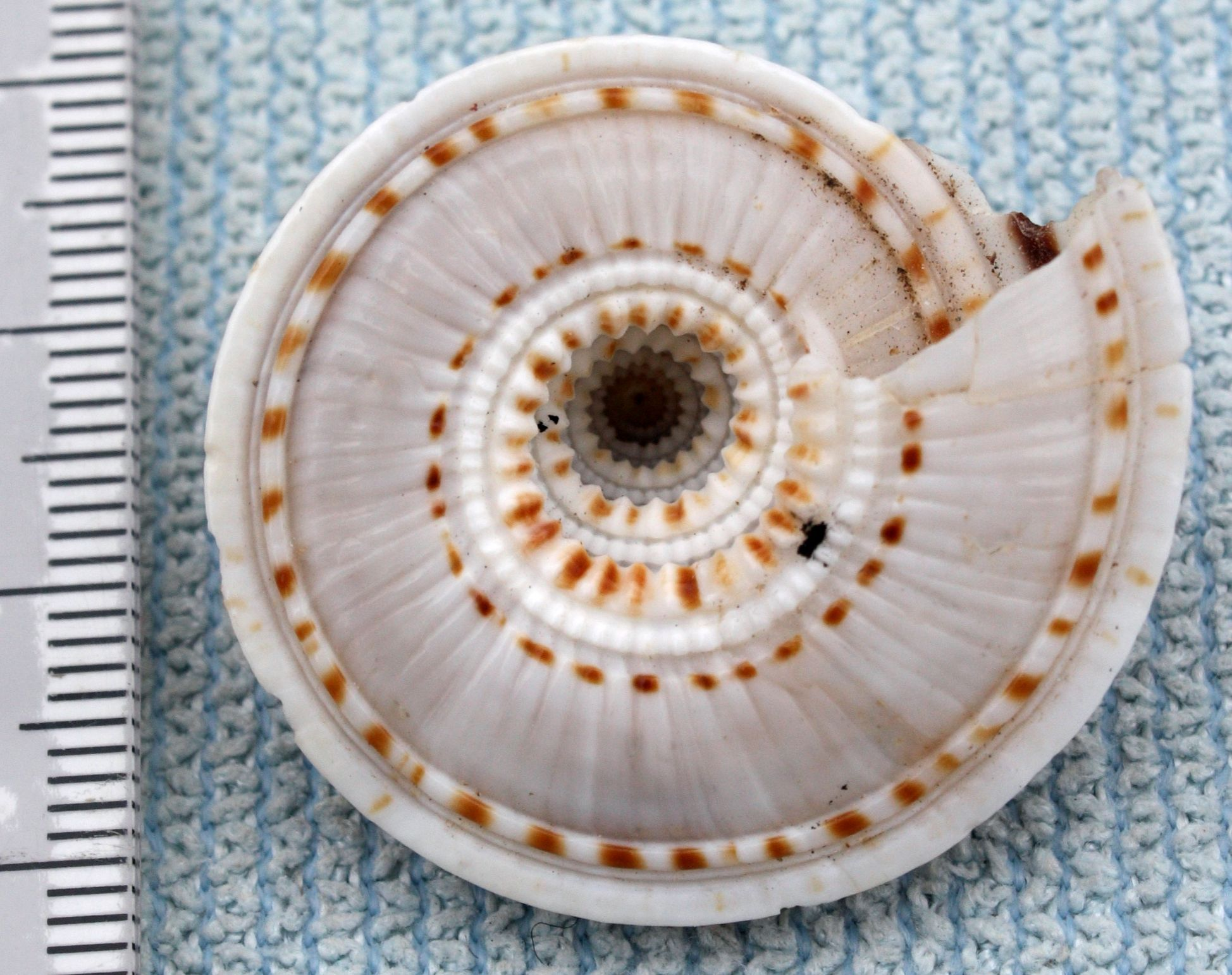
Architectonica perspectiva

Architectonica is a genus of sea snails in the family Architectonicidae.

== Characteristics ==
(Described as Solarium) The shell is depressed-conic and is angular at the periphery. The aperture is subquadrangular, and the lip is simple. The umbilicus has crenulated margins.It is spiral, wide, and perspective. The shells are beautifully sculptured.

The animal has a large foot, which is notched in front and has a very pronounced marginal fold. The head is large, and is furnished with two tentacles which are short, thick, cylindrical, and folded, with the suture below. The eyes are located on swellings near the outer bases of the tentacles. The gill-cavity is divided by a longitudinal fold.

== Species ==
According to the World Register of Marine Species, the following species are included in the genus Architectonica:

- † Architectonica affinis (J. De C. Sowerby, 1840)
- † Architectonica angsanana (K. Martin, 1922)
- Architectonica arcana Bieler, 1993
- Architectonica axelalfi Thach, 2023
- † Architectonica beetsi Harzhauser, Raven & Landau, 2018
- † Architectonica catanesei Petuch, 1994
- Architectonica consobrina Bieler, 1993
- † Architectonica corwini Ladd, 1972
- † Architectonica euomphaloides (d'Archiac & Haime, 1854)
- Architectonica grandiosa Iredale, 1931
- Architectonica gualtierii Bieler, 1993
- † Architectonica javana (K. Martin, 1879)
- † Architectonica karikalensis (Cossmann, 1910)
- Architectonica karsteni Rutsch, 1934
- † Architectonica koeneni (Ravn, 1939)
- Architectonica laevigata (Lamarck, 1816)
- † Architectonica lenticulata (Yokoyama, 1920)
- † Architectonica llajasensis Sutherland, 1966
- Architectonica maculata (Link, 1807)
- † Architectonica mariae (Báldi, 1961)
- † Architectonica martini (Haanstra & Spiker, 1932)
- Architectonica maxima (Philippi, 1849)
- Architectonica modesta (Philippi, 1849)
- † Architectonica microdiscus (O. Boettger, 1883)
- Architectonica nobilis Röding, 1798 - common sundial
- † Architectonica palembangensis (Haanstra & Spiker, 1932)
- Architectonica perdix (Hinds, 1844)
- Architectonica perspectiva (Linnaeus, 1758)
- † Architectonica plana (Wanner & Hahn, 1935)
- Architectonica proestleri Alf & Kreipl, 2001
- Architectonica purpurata (Hinds, 1844)
- † Architectonica puruensis (K. Martin, 1914)
- † Architectonica rivulensis Lozouet, 1999
- † Architectonica sedanensis (K. Martin, 1905)
- † Architectonica sigillaria Lozouet, 1999
- † Architectonica sokkohensis (K. Martin, 1916)
- † Architectonica songoensis (K. Martin, 1914)
- † Architectonica spinogula Laws, 1941
- Architectonica stellata (Philippi, 1849)
- † Architectonica taramellii (Dainelli, 1915)
- Architectonica taylori (Hanley, 1862)
- Architectonica trochlearis (Hinds, 1844)

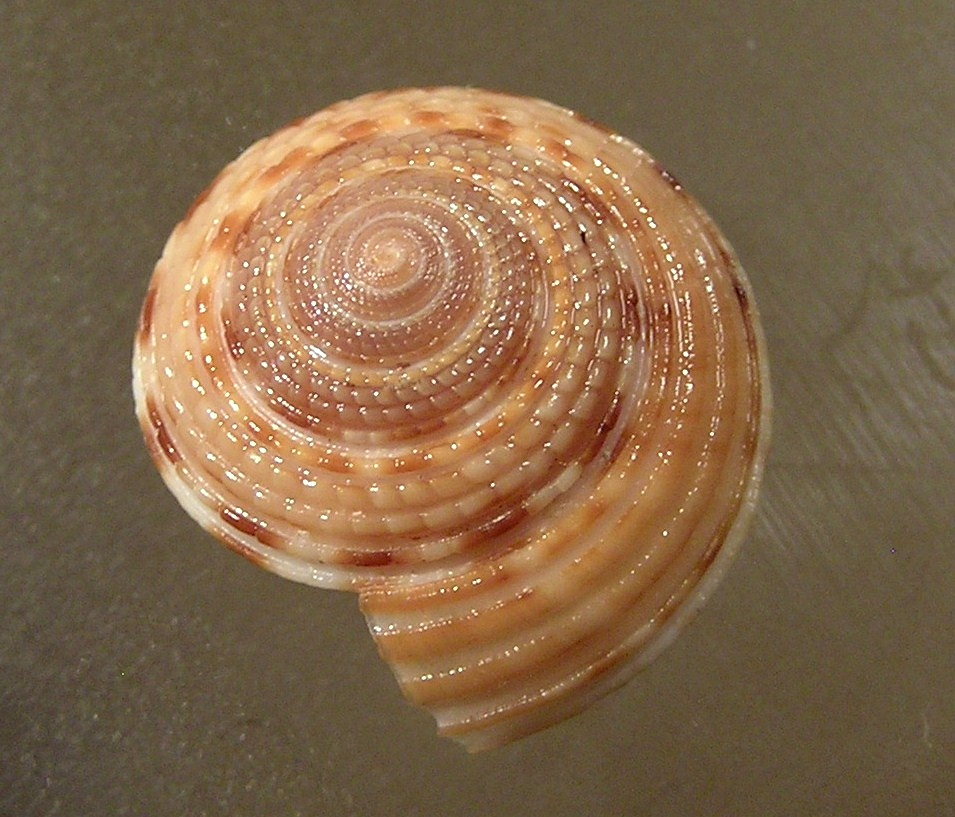
Architectonica (Maxima-group) consobrina

Architectonica plicata, a fossil species from the London Clay, Eocene; Barton cliff, Hampshire, England

The Indo-Pacific Molluscan Database also includes the following names in current use

- Architectonica bairdii (Sowerby, 1866)
- Architectonica (maxima-group) Bieler, 1993
- Architectonica (perspectiva-group) Bieler, 1993

Species in the genus Architectonica may include:

- Architectonica acuta
- Architectonica acutissima
- Architectonica amoena
- Architectonica bellistriata
- Architectonica briarti
- Architectonica cingulatum
- † Architectonica cognata Gabb, 1864 (uncertain > unassessed)
- Architectonica cyclostomum
- Architectonica euprepes
- Architectonica fimbiaea
- Architectonica fuliginosum
- Architectonica geminicostata
- Architectonica guppyi
- Architectonica kurodae
- Architectonica lutea
- Architectonica mediterraneum
- † Architectonica meekana Gabb, 1860 (uncertain > unassessed)
- Architectonica melajoensis
- Architectonica neerlandica
- Architectonica planorbis
- Architectonica planulata
- † Architectonica quadriseriata (G. B. Sowerby I, 1850) (uncertain > unassessed)
- Architectonica quinquesulcata
- Architectonica regia (Hanley, 1862) (uncertain > taxon inquirendum, based on single aberrant shell; specific allocation within Architectonica uncertain)
- Architectonica scrobiculata
- † Architectonica voragiformis Stephenson, 1941 (uncertain > unassessed)

== Synonyms ==
- Architectonica biangulatum (Gray, 1826): synonym of Solarium biangulatum J. E. Gray, 1826 (nomen dubium)
- † Architectonica carocollata (Lamarck, 1822): synonym of † Simplexollata carocollata (Lamarck, 1822) (superseded combination)
- Architectonica gothica Röding, 1798: synonym of Heliacus (Grandeliacus) stramineus (Gmelin, 1791)
- Architectonica granulata (Lamarck, 1816): synonym of Architectonica nobilis Röding, 1798
- Architectonica impressum (Nevill, 1869): synonym of Ethminolia impressa (G. Nevill & H. Nevill, 1869)
- Architectonica krebsii Mörch, 1875: synonym of Psilaxis krebsii (Mörch, 1875) (basionym)
- Architectonica kuroharai Kuroda & Habe in Habe, 1961: synonym of Adelphotectonica kuroharai (Kuroda & Habe in Habe, 1961)
- † Architectonica marwicki R. S. Allan, 1926: synonym of † Granosolarium marwicki (R. S. Allan, 1926) (superseded combination)
- † Architectonica millegranum (Lamarck, 1822): synonym of Granosolarium millegranum (Lamarck, 1822)
- † Architectonica millegranum subcanaliculatum (Lamarck, 1822): synonym of Granosolarium millegranum (Lamarck, 1822)
- Architectonica nomotoi Kosuge, 1979: synonym of Adelphotectonica nomotoi (Kosuge, 1979)
- Architectonica offlexa Iredale, 1931: synonym of Adelphotectonica reevei (Hanley, 1862)
- Architectonica pentacyclota Azuma, 1973: synonym of Adelphotectonica kuroharai (Kuroda & Habe in Habe, 1961)
- Architectonica peracuta (Dall, 1889): synonym of Discotectonica discus (R. A. Philippi, 1844)
- Architectonica picta (Philippi, 1849): synonym of Architectonica maculata (Link, 1807)
- Architectonica placentalis (Hinds, 1844): synonym of Discotectonica placentalis (Hinds, 1844)
- † Architectonica pseudoperspectiva (Brocchi, 1814): synonym of † Discotectonica pseudoperspective (Brocchi, 1814)
- Architectonica radialis Dall, 1908: synonym of Solatisonax radialis (Dall, 1908)
- Architectonica radiata Röding, 1798: synonym of Psilaxis radiatus (Röding, 1798)
- Architectonica reevei (Hanley, 1862): synonym of Adelphotectonica reevei (Hanley, 1862)
- Architectonica relata Iredale, 1936: synonym of Adelphotectonica reevei (Hanley, 1862)
- † Architectonica simplex (Bronn, 1831): synonym of † Simplexollata simplex (Bronn, 1831) (superseded combination)
- Architectonica sindermanni Merrill & Boss, 1984: synonym of Adelphotectonica uruguaya (Carcelles, 1953)
- Architectonica sunderlandi Petuch, 1987: synonym of Adelphotectonica uruguaya (Carcelles, 1953)
- Architectonica uruguaya: synonym of Adelphotectonica uruguaya (Carcelles, 1953)
- Architectonica valenciennesii Mörch, 1859: synonym of Architectonica nobilis Röding, 1798
- Architectonica wroblewskyi Mörch, 1875: synonym of Architectonica nobilis Röding, 1798
