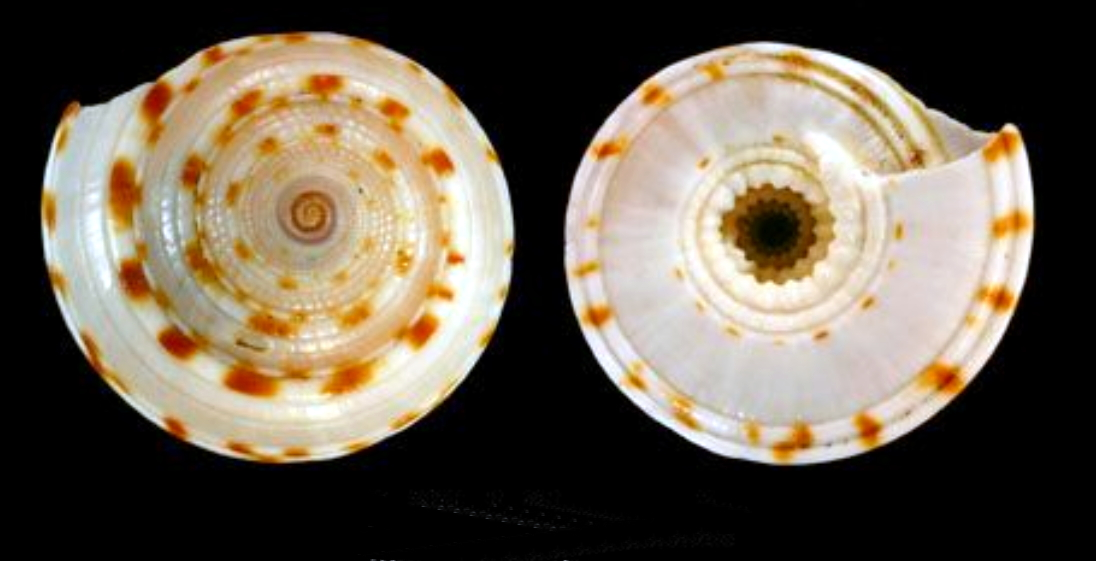
- A shell of Architectonica purpurata (specimen at the Natural History Museum Rotterdam)

Scientific classification
- Kingdom: Animalia
- Phylum: Mollusca
- Class: Gastropoda
- Family: Architectonicidae
- Genus: Architectonica
- Species: A. purpurata

Binomial name
- Architectonica purpurata (Hinds, 1844)

Synonyms
- Solarium purpurata Hinds, 1844

= Architectonica purpurata =

Species of gastropod

Architectonica purpurata, common name the partridge sundial, is a species of sea snail, a marine gastropod mollusc in the family Architectonicidae, the sundials.

== Description ==
(Original description in Latin) The shell is conico-orbicular, in other words it has essentially a low, depressed cone with a rounded base. The whorls are somewhat swollen. The whorls of the spire are longitudinally and obliquely folded (plicate), and they are girdled superiorly by two grooves (sulci). They are adorned with sub-paired, rufous-brown spots. The median area is pale ashy. The shell is keeled at the periphery and articulately spotted. The base has rufous-brown stripes that are radiately arranged. The umbilicus is somewhat wide-open and possesses small whitish crenations.

== Distribution ==
This marine species can be found in the coastal waters of India, Sri Lanka, Borneo, the Philippines and Indonesia.

== Habitat ==
Architectonica perdix lives on sandy bottoms, at depths of 10–60 m.
