= Architectonica grandiosa =

Scientific classification
- Kingdom: Animalia
- Phylum: Mollusca
- Class: Gastropoda
- Family: Architectonicidae
- Genus: Architectonica
- Species: A. grandiosa

Binomial name
- Architectonica grandiosa Iredale, 1931

Synonyms
- Solarium grandiosum (Iredale, 1931).

Species of gastropod

Architectonica grandiosa is a species of sea snail, a marine gastropod mollusk in the family Architectonicidae, which are known as the staircase shells or sundials.

== Description ==
The diameter of the shell attains 45 mm, its height is 20 mm. The shell is large for this family and the adult shell has whorls with nodulose spiral cords at top and bottom, the nodules of only the lower cord becoming weaker with growth; cords are white or alternating white and brown.

(original description) The shell is large and conical, with eight slightly convex whorls and a sharply angulate periphery; the umbilicus is large and deeply perspective. Each whorl is bordered by a raised cream cingulum that is regularly blotched with reddish brown, while the intervening band varies in colour from deep pink to deep cream.

On the base, an unspotted, wrinkled rib surrounds the umbilicus, followed by a spotted rib, then a spotted intervening zone, and finally two spotted ribs at the outer edge. The sculpture consists of oblique, evenly spaced cuts that override the earlier whorls, where a couple of concentric grooves are still visible; with growth, both cuts and grooves weaken and become obsolete on the body whorl, which shows only a fine striation. The base is similarly finely striate.

The columella is straight and perpendicular, ending basally in a notched projection. The aperture is subquadrate.

== Distribution ==
This marine species is endemic to Australia and can be found off New South Wales, Northern Territory, Queensland, and Western Australia.
