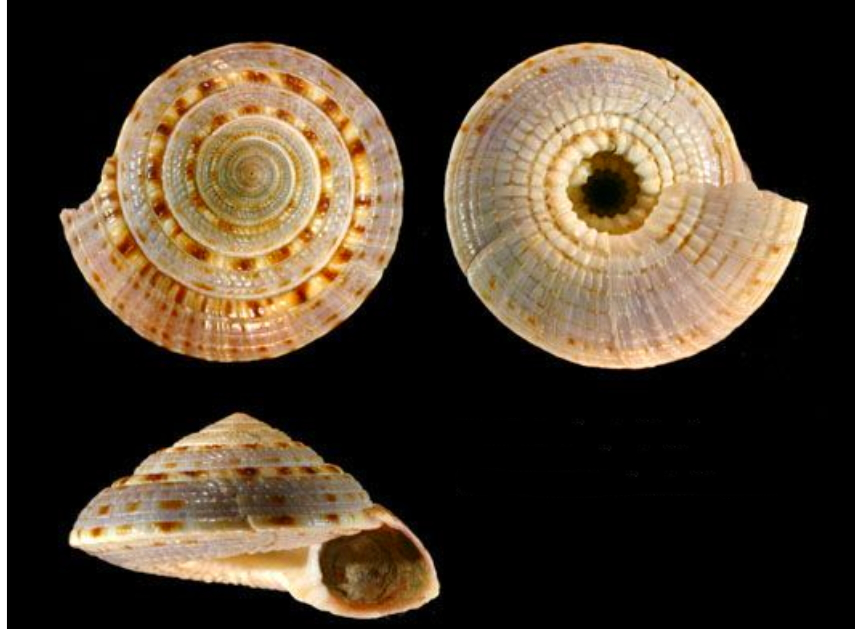
- Shell of Architectonica trochlearis (specimen at the Natural History Museum, Rotterdam)

Scientific classification
- Kingdom: Animalia
- Phylum: Mollusca
- Class: Gastropoda
- Family: Architectonicidae
- Genus: Architectonica
- Species: A. trochlearis

Binomial name
- Architectonica trochlearis (Hinds, 1844)

Synonyms
- Solarium trochleare Hinds, 1844

= Architectonica trochlearis =

Species of gastropod

Architectonica trochlearis is a species of sea snail, a marine gastropod mollusk in the family Architectonicidae, which are known as the staircase shells or sundials.

== Description ==
The diameter of the shell attains 40 mm.

(Original description in Latin) The shell is orbiculato-conoidal (with a conical spire but a rounded, almost disc-like base) and is somewhat depressed. The whorls are somewhat swollen. The whorls of the spire are longitudinally folded (plicate), while the body whorl is smooth. They are divided superiorly by a single groove. The uppermost area is banded with dark-brown, and it is encircled below with quadrate dark-brown spots. It is keeled at the periphery and articulately ornamented with white and dark-brown spots. The base is a little swollen. The umbilicus is large and wide-open, possessing somewhat acute brown crenations.

== Distribution ==
This marine species can be found off East Asia and Southeast Asia (Japan, China, the Philippines); East Africa, the Red Sea and Australia (Northern Territory, Queensland)
