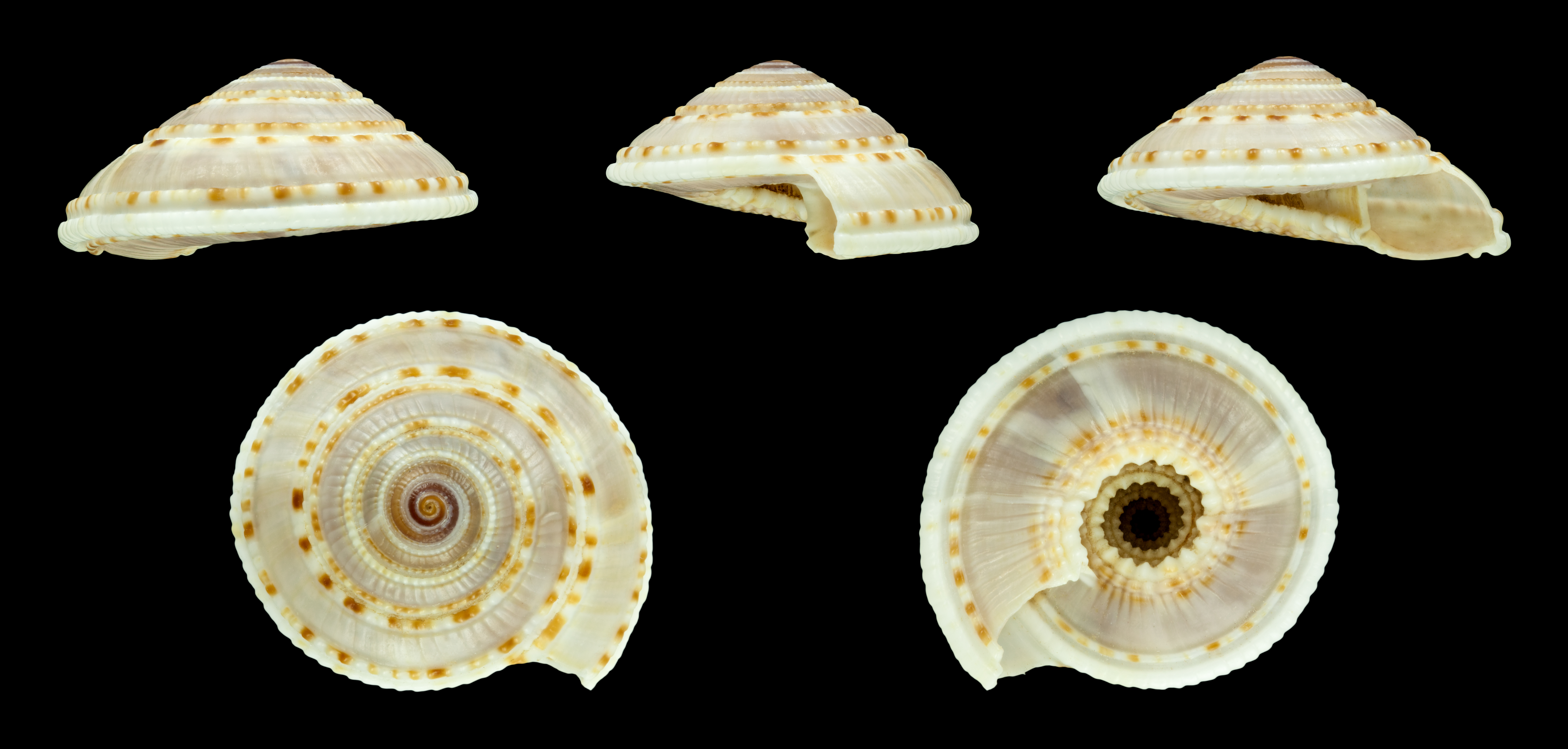
- A shell of Architectonica perdix

Scientific classification
- Kingdom: Animalia
- Phylum: Mollusca
- Class: Gastropoda
- Family: Architectonicidae
- Genus: Architectonica
- Species: A. perdix

Binomial name
- Architectonica perdix (Hinds, 1844)

Synonyms
- Solarium dunkeri Hanley, 1862; Solarium perdix Hinds, 1844

= Architectonica perdix =

Partridge sundial

Species of gastropod

Architectonica perdix, common name the partridge sundial, is a species of sea snail, a marine gastropod mollusc in the family Architectonicidae, the sundials.

== Description ==
(Original description in Latin) The thin shell is conoidal, smooth, and pale. The whorls are somewhat swollen and are divided superiorly by a single girdle. The whorls of the spire are minutely fold-striated. The shell is angled and three-keeled (tricarinate) at the periphery, where the middle keel is prominent, larger, and crenate-bearing. The girdle and the keels are adorned with reddish-brown, sub-quadrate spots. The umbilicus is wide-open and is encircled by small white crenules.

Architectonica perdix has a shell that reaches 65–83 mm in maximum dimension. This shell is low-spired and quite flattened, with a beaded surface. It has seven flatly convex whorls and the base of shell is slight convex in the centre. The sutures are finely incised. The basic shell color is cream, with brown spots.

== Distribution ==
This species can be found in the Eastern Indian Ocean and the tropical Indo-West Pacific: Madagascar, Tanzania, southeastern India, Sri Lanka, northern China, Australia] (Northern Territory, Queensland, Western Australia).

== Habitat ==
Architectonica perdix lives on sandy bottoms, at depths of 10–60 m.
