= Architectonica arcana =

Scientific classification
- Kingdom: Animalia
- Phylum: Mollusca
- Class: Gastropoda
- Family: Architectonicidae
- Genus: Architectonica
- Species: A. arcana

Binomial name
- Architectonica arcana Bieler, 1993

Species of gastropod

Architectonica arcana is a species of sea snail, a marine type of gastropod in the family Architectonicidae, which are known as the staircase shells or sundials.

== Description ==
Architectonica arcana is a marine gastropod of the Indo-Pacific

== Distribution ==
This species can be found in the Indo-Pacific
