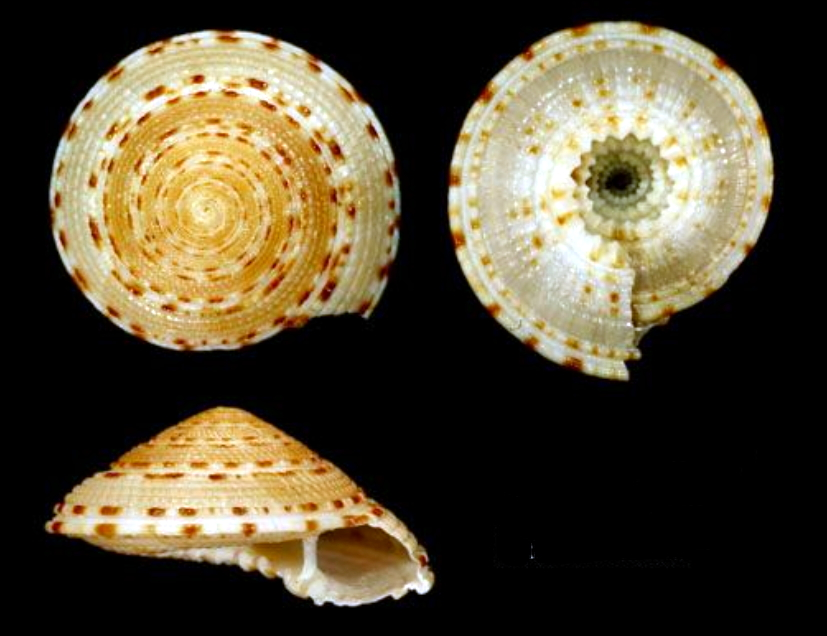
- Shell of Architectonica proestleri (specimen at the Natural History Museum Rotterdam)

Scientific classification
- Kingdom: Animalia
- Phylum: Mollusca
- Class: Gastropoda
- Family: Architectonicidae
- Genus: Architectonica
- Species: A. proestleri

Binomial name
- Architectonica proestleri Alf & Kreipl, 2001

= Architectonica proestleri =

Species of gastropod

Architectonica proestleri is a species of sea snail, a marine gastropod mollusk in the family Architectonicidae, which are known as the staircase shells or sundials.

== Description ==
The diameter of the shell 12-26 mm, its height is 10.3 mm. The shell is thin and lightweight, medium sized with 5-6.25 whorls.

== Distribution ==
This species can be found in the Philippines.
