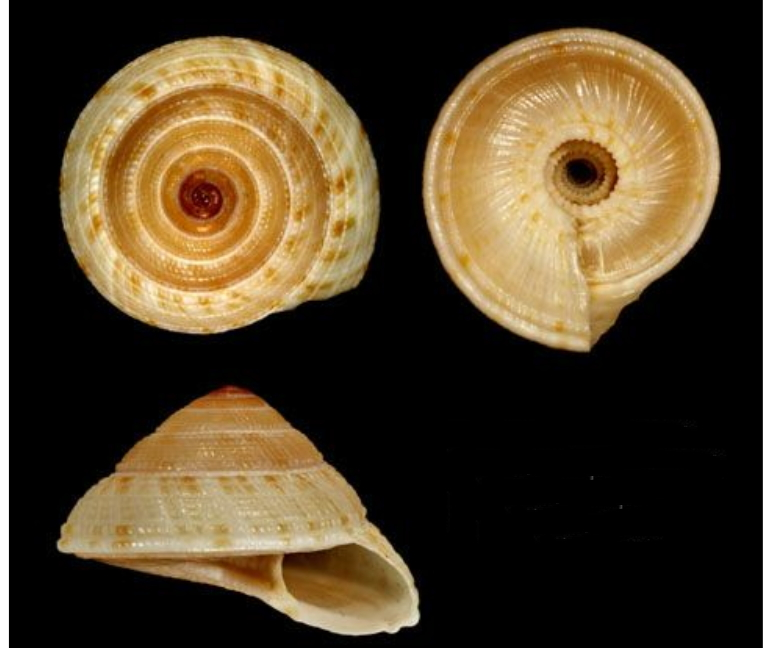
- Shell of Adelphotectonica reevei (specimen at the Natural History Museum Rotterdam)

Scientific classification
- Kingdom: Animalia
- Phylum: Mollusca
- Class: Gastropoda
- Family: Architectonicidae
- Genus: Adelphotectonica
- Species: A. reevei

Binomial name
- Adelphotectonica reevei (Hanley, 1862)

Synonyms
- Architectonica offlexa Iredale, 1931; Architectonica reevei (Hanley, 1862); Architectonica reevei venusta Kuroda in Kuroda, Habe & Oyama, 1971; Architectonica relata Iredale, 1936; Solarium reevei Hanley, 1862

= Adelphotectonica reevei =

Species of gastropod

Adelphotectonica reevei is a species of sea snail, a marine gastropod mollusk in the family Architectonicidae, known as the staircase shells or sundials.

== Description ==
The diameter of the shell attains 28 mm, its height 20 mm.

(Original description in Latin) The shell is tawny-flesh or livid-flesh-colored. It is encircled on each whorl by small, intensely tawny spots arranged in 5-6 series. It is radiated with contiguous, thin, transversely oblique striae that eventually become obsolete. The suture is not channeled. The whorls are not rapidly expanded.

They are ornamented below a broad, minimally deep spiral groove by a supra-sutural girdle (sometimes two), which is often whitish and remotely articulated with tawny brown. Elsewhere, they are inconspicuously spirally sculptured (except for the groove below the first zone). The base and periphery are almost as in S. laevigato. However, the near-umbilical girdle (which includes the very many small crenations of the constricted umbilicus) is closely spotted.

== Distribution ==
This marine species has a wide distribution and can be found from Eastern Indian Ocean to the western Pacific; also off Australia and New Zealand (North Island).
