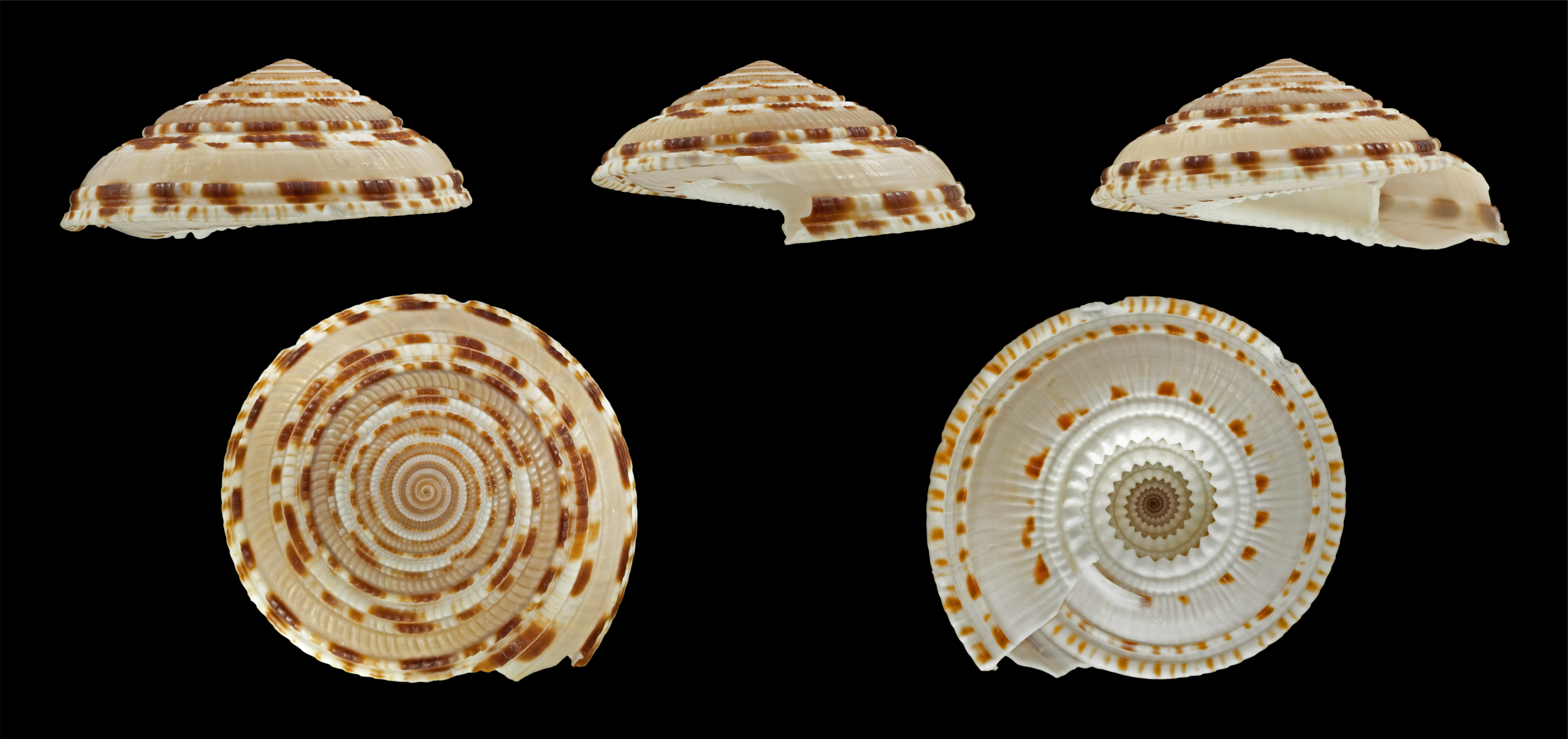
- Shell of Architectonica maculata

Scientific classification
- Kingdom: Animalia
- Phylum: Mollusca
- Class: Gastropoda
- Family: Architectonicidae
- Genus: Architectonica
- Species: A. maculata

Binomial name
- Architectonica maculata (Link, 1807)

Synonyms
- Architectonica picta (R. A. Philippi, 1849) junior subjective synonym; Solarium (Solarium) tryoni J. T. Marshall, 1887; Solarium fragile Hinds, 1844; Solarium maculatum Link, 1807; Solarium pictum R. A. Philippi, 1849 junior subjective synonym; Solarium tryoni J. T. Marshall, 1887

= Architectonica maculata =

Species of gastropod

Architectonica maculata is a species of sea snail, a marine gastropod mollusk in the family Architectonicidae, which are known as the staircase shells or sundials.

== Description ==
(Original description of Solarium fragile in Latin) The shell is round and disk-shaped; the whorls are encircled by four rows of tubercles (small knobs); the uppermost and the lowermost are painted brown, while the middle ones are pearly. At the periphery it is angular and finely notched. The base is swollen. The umbilicus is open, surrounded by a ring of small, sharp white crenulations; the umbilical area is smooth; and the aperture is triangular.

== Distribution ==
This marine species has a wide distribution and can be found in Southeast Asia, the Philippines, Indonesia; also off Australia, the Solomon Islands and Hong Kong.
