= Architectonica axelalfi =

Scientific classification
- Kingdom: Animalia
- Phylum: Mollusca
- Class: Gastropoda
- Family: Architectonicidae
- Genus: Architectonica
- Species: A. axelalfi

Binomial name
- Architectonica axelalfi Thach, 2023

Species of gastropod

Architectonica axelalfi is a species of sea snail, a marine gastropod mollusk in the family Architectonicidae, which are known as the staircase shells or sundials.

== Distribution ==
This marine species can be found off Vietnam.
