= Melanella lautoides =

Scientific classification
- Kingdom: Animalia
- Phylum: Mollusca
- Class: Gastropoda
- Subclass: Caenogastropoda
- Order: Littorinimorpha
- Family: Eulimidae
- Genus: Melanella
- Species: †M. lautoides

Binomial name
- †Melanella lautoides H. J. Finlay & Marwick, 1937

Species of gastropod

Melanella lautoides is an extinct species of sea snail, a marine gastropod mollusk in the family Eulimidae. The species is one of a number within the genus Melanella.

== Distribution ==
Fossils of this marine species were found near Wangaloa, New Zealand.
