= Architectonica gualtierii =

Scientific classification
- Kingdom: Animalia
- Phylum: Mollusca
- Class: Gastropoda
- Family: Architectonicidae
- Genus: Architectonica
- Species: A. gualtierii

Binomial name
- Architectonica gualtierii Bieler, 1993

Species of gastropod

Architectonica gualtierii is a species of sea snail, a marine gastropod mollusk in the family Architectonicidae, which are known as the staircase shells or sundials.

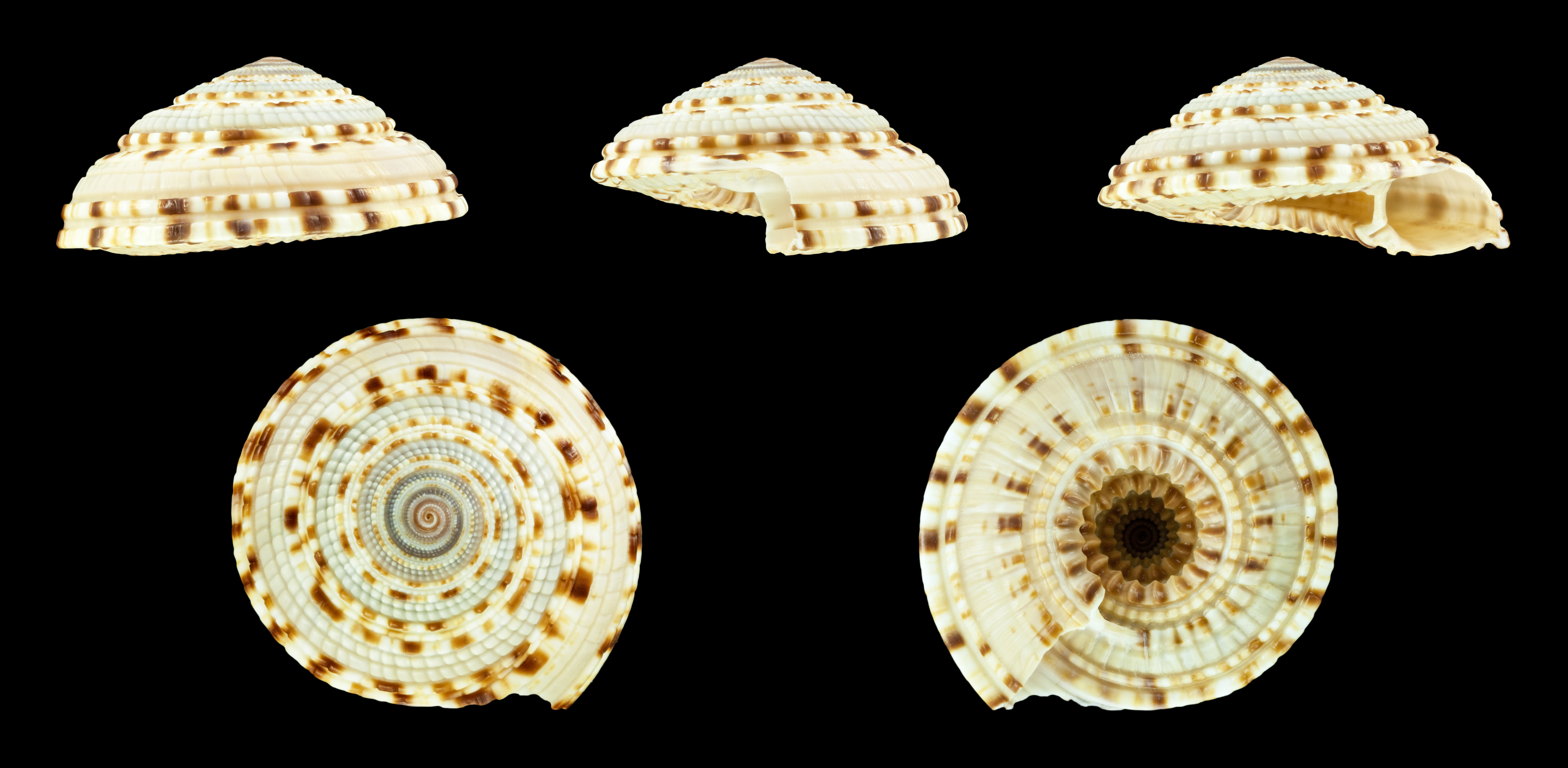
Shells of Architectonica gualtierii

== Description ==
Architectonica gualtierii has a shell that reaches 61 mm.

== Distribution ==
This species can be found in the Indo-Pacific, from East Africa via Japan, the Philippines and Vietnam to eastern Australia.
