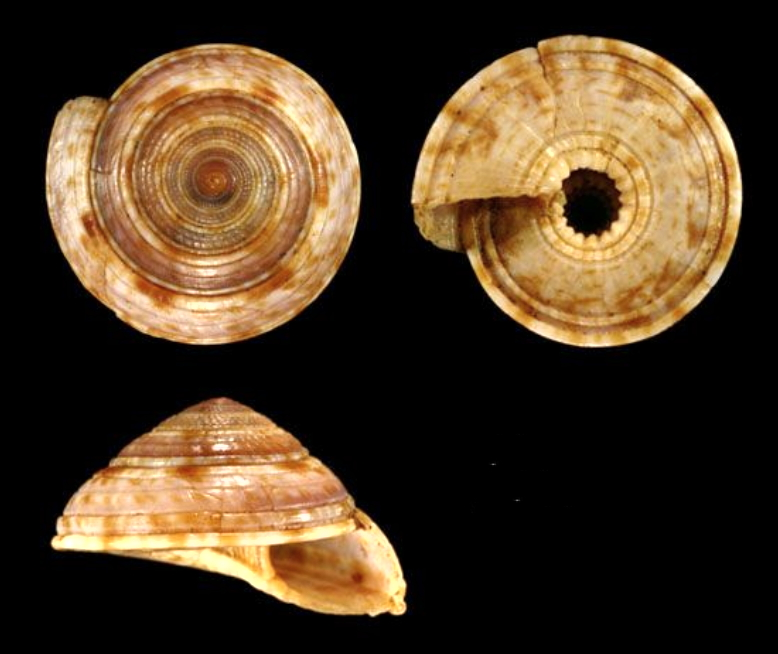
- Shell of Architectonica laevigata (specimen at the Natural History Museum, Rotterdam)

Scientific classification
- Kingdom: Animalia
- Phylum: Mollusca
- Class: Gastropoda
- Family: Architectonicidae
- Genus: Architectonica
- Species: A. laevigata

Binomial name
- Architectonica laevigata (Lamarck, 1816)

Synonyms
- Solarium laevigatum Lamarck, 1816

= Architectonica laevigata =

Species of gastropod

Architectonica laevigata is a species of sea snail, a marine gastropod mollusk in the family Architectonicidae, which are known as the staircase shells or sundials.

== Description ==
The diameter of the shell attains 30 mm.

== Distribution ==
This marine species can be found in tropical and warm-temperate regions in the Central and Eastern Indian Ocean, in the Red Sea, off the Philippines; also off Queensland, Australia.
