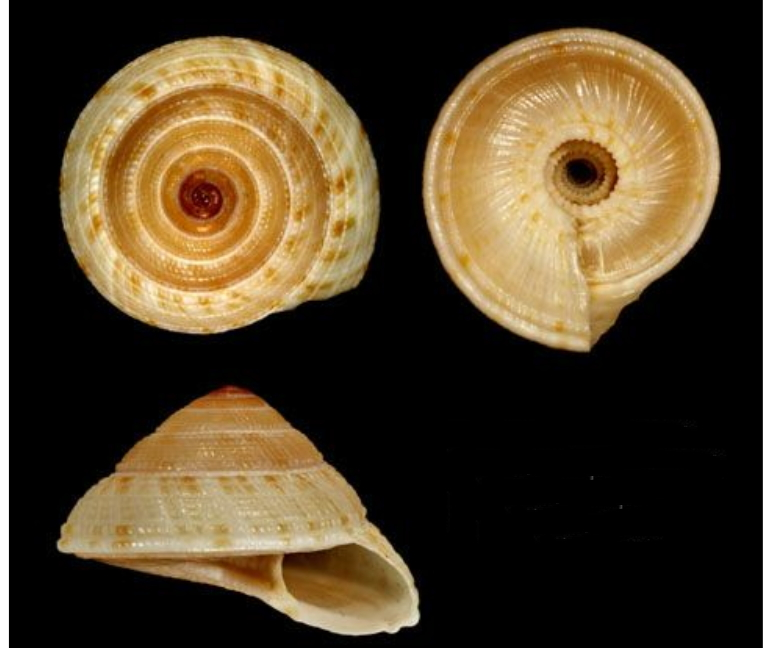
- Shell of Adelphotectonica reevei

Scientific classification
- Kingdom: Animalia
- Phylum: Mollusca
- Class: Gastropoda
- Family: Architectonicidae
- Genus: Adelphotectonica; Bieler, 1987

Type species
- Solarium reevei Hanley, 1862

Synonyms
- Architectonica (Adelphotectonica) Bieler, 1987 (original rank)

= Adelphotectonica =

Genus of gastropods

Adelphotectonica is a genus of sea snails in the family Architectonicidae.

== Genera ==
- † Adelphotectonica bieleri Ceulemans, Van Dingenen & Landau, 2018
- Adelphotectonica kuroharai (Kuroda & T. Habe, 1961)
- Adelphotectonica nomotoi (Kosuge, 1979)
- Adelphotectonica reevei (Hanley, 1862)
- Adelphotectonica uruguaya (Carcelles, 1953)
