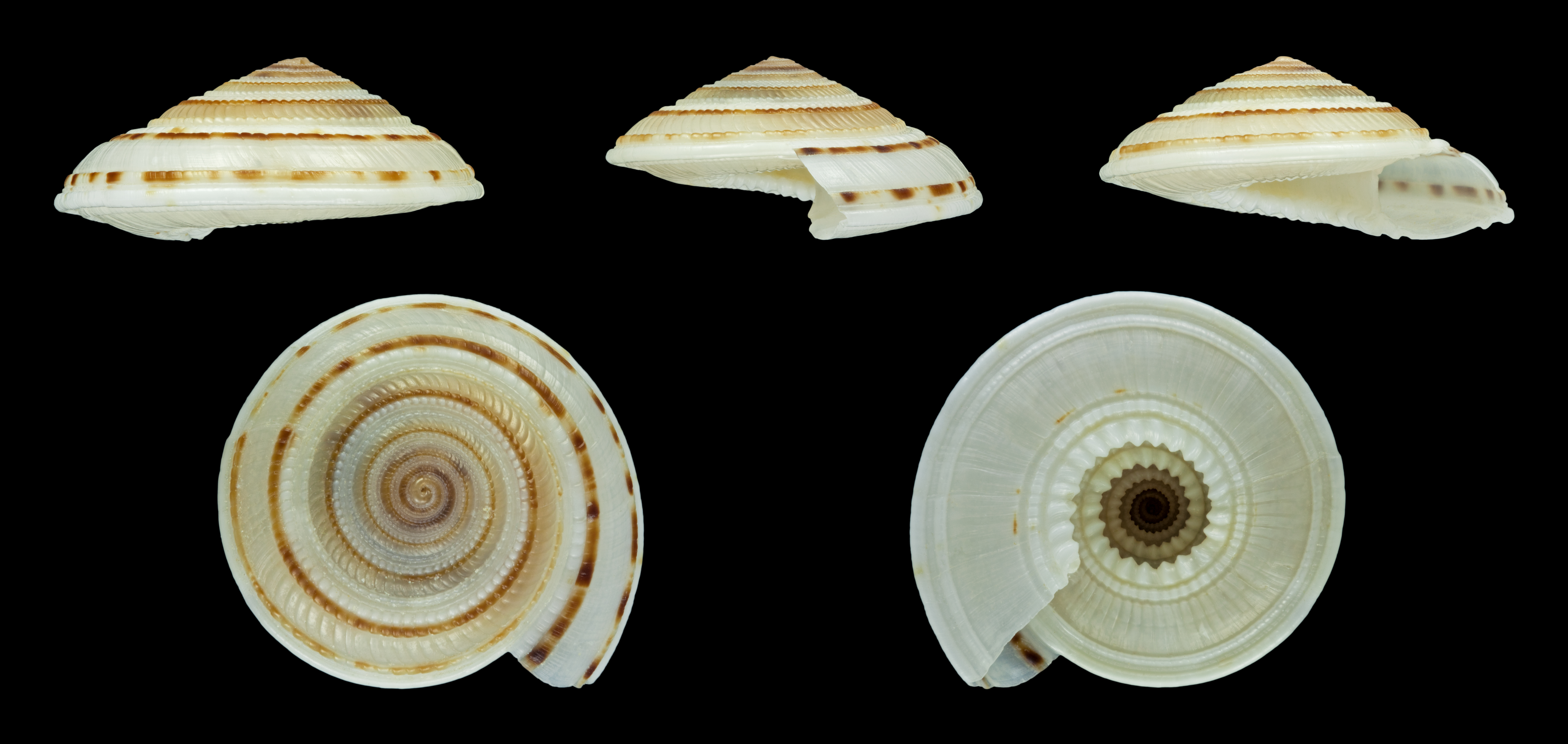
- Shell of Architectonica modesta

Scientific classification
- Kingdom: Animalia
- Phylum: Mollusca
- Class: Gastropoda
- Family: Architectonicidae
- Genus: Architectonica
- Species: A. modesta

Binomial name
- Architectonica modesta (Philippi, 1849)

Synonyms
- Architectonica perspectiva var. modesta (R. A. Philippi, 1849) superseded rank; Solarium modestum R. A. Philippi, 1849 superseded combination

= Architectonica modesta =

Species of gastropod

Architectonica modesta, the giant sundial, is a species of sea snail, a marine gastropod mollusk in the family Architectonicidae, which are known as the staircase shells or sundials.

== Description ==
(Original description in Latin) The shell is conical, ashy-tawny, and marked with brown zones. The whorls are somewhat convex and are bisulcate (two-grooved) superiorly. The uppermost girdle is white and crenulated, while the second one is brown. The two lowest girdles are divided by an elevated ridge (lira); the upper of these is brown, and the lowest is white. The shell is painted with crowded, yellow, and somewhat obsolete radiating lines. The base is flat and ashy. The umbilicus is equal to two-thirds of the body whorl and is encircled by large white crenations.

The shell contains 7 whorls. The upper whorls are radiately incised, as is usual. A crenulated zone is also apparent on the body whorl. This uppermost zone is milky (or milk-white), and it appears crenulated, being sprinkled here and there with obsolete rusty spots. There is an elevated ridge (lira) between the marginal girdle and the penultimate girdle of the base. The crenations of the umbilicus number about 20.

== Distribution ==
This species can be found in the tropical Indo-Pacific, from East Africa and the Persian Gulf to western Pacific, Japan, Australia (Northern Territory, Queensland, Western Australia).
