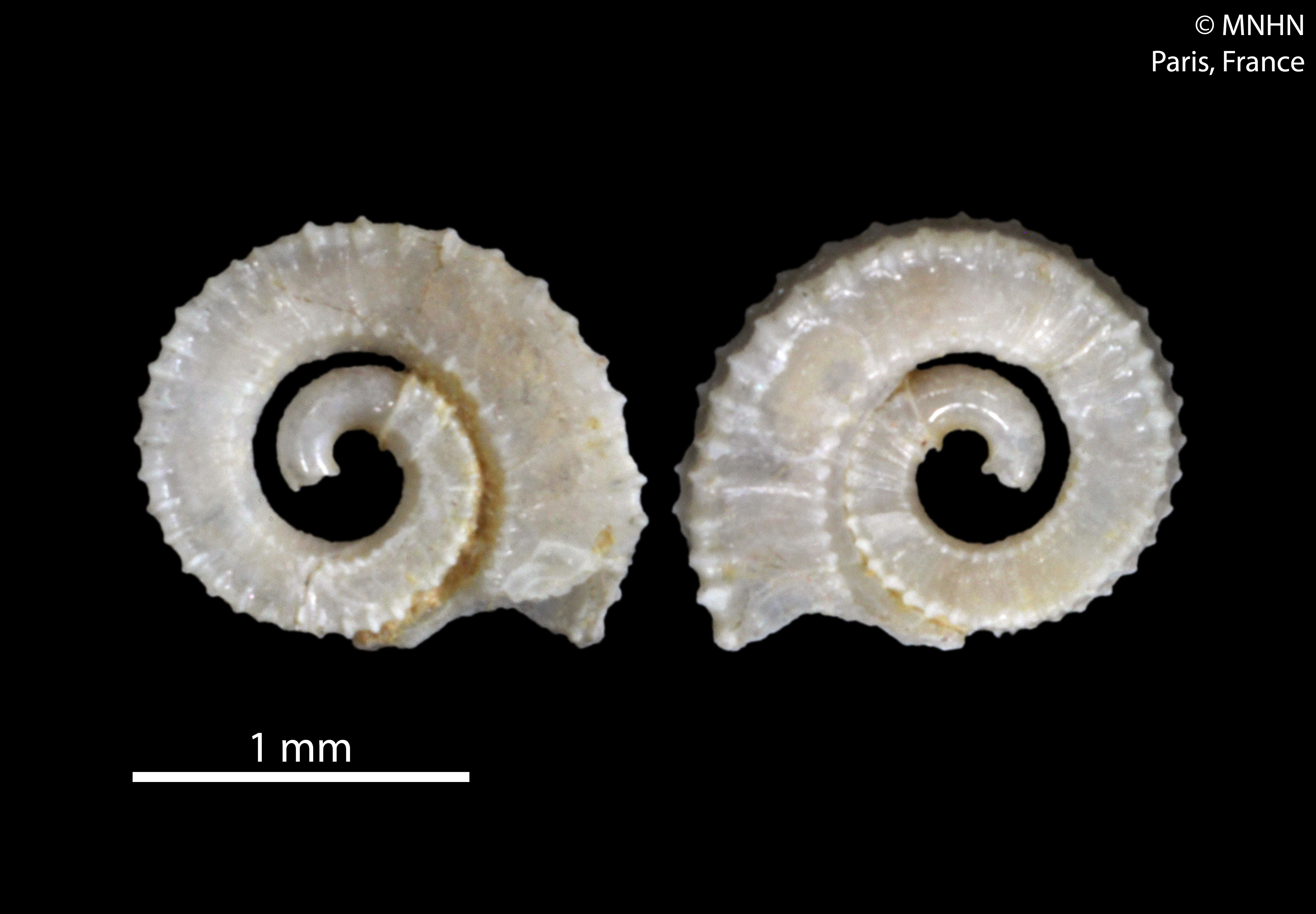
- Shell of Spirolaxis centrifuga (specimen at MNHN, Paris)

Scientific classification
- Kingdom: Animalia
- Phylum: Mollusca
- Class: Gastropoda
- Infraclass: "Lower Heterobranchia"
- Superfamily: Architectonicoidea
- Family: Architectonicidae
- Genus: Spirolaxis; Monterosato, 1913

Type species
- Spirolaxis centrifuga (Monterosato, 1890)

Synonyms
- Aguayodiscus Jaume & Borro, 1946; Paurodiscus Rehder, 1935; Pseudomalaxis (Paurodiscus) Rehder, 1935; Pseudomalaxis (Spirolaxis) Monterosato, 1913 (original rank as subgenus); Spirolaxis (Aguayodiscus) Jaume & Borro, 1946

= Spirolaxis =

Genus of gastropods

Spirolaxis is a genus of sea snails, marine gastropod mollusks in the family Architectonicidae, the staircase shells or sundials.

== Description ==
(Original description) The shell is discoidal; its whorls are quadrangular, detached, and solute.

== Species ==
- Spirolaxis argonauta Bieler, 1993
- Spirolaxis centrifuga (Monterosato, 1890)
- Spirolaxis clenchi Jaume & Borro, 1946
- † Spirolaxis cohaerentia Laws, 1944
- Spirolaxis cornuammonis (Melvill & Standen, 1903)
- Spirolaxis cornuarietis Bieler, 1993
- Spirolaxis exornatus Bieler, 1993
- Spirolaxis lamellifer (Rehder, 1935)
- Spirolaxis rotulacatharinea (Melvill & Standen, 1903)

Synonyms

- Spirolaxis macandrewi (Iredale, 1911): synonym of Spirolaxis centrifuga (Monterosato, 1890)
