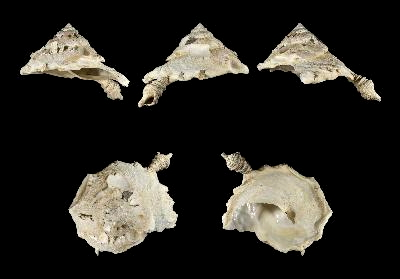
- Shells of Discotectonica alfi (holotype in MNHN, Paris)

Scientific classification
- Kingdom: Animalia
- Phylum: Mollusca
- Class: Gastropoda
- Family: Architectonicidae
- Genus: Discotectonica; Marwick, 1931

Species
- See text

Synonyms
- Acutitectonica Habe, 1961; † Architectonica (Discotectonica) Marwick, 1931 superseded rank; Russetia Garrard, 1961

= Discotectonica =

Genus of gastropods

Discotectonica is a genus of sea snails, marine gastropod mollusks in the family Architectonicidae, the staircase shells or sundials.

== Distribution ==
This genus occurs in the Atlantic Ocean off the Canaries and West African, in European waters (the Bay of Biscay) and the Mediterranean Sea.

== Species ==
Species within the genus Discotectonica include:

- Discotectonica acutissima (Sowerby, 1914)
- Discotectonica alfi Thach, 2017
- † Discotectonica balcombensis (H. J. Finlay, 1927)
- Discotectonica discus (Philippi, 1844)
- † Discotectonica hokianga (Vella, 1954)
- † Discotectonica navidadensis Frassinetti & Covacevich, 1982
- Discotectonica nipponica (Kuroda & Habe in Kuroda, Habe & Oyama, 1971)
- Discotectonica petasus (Tomlin, 1928)
- Discotectonica placentalis (Hinds, 1844)
- † Discotectonica platyplagia (Dell, 1952)
- † Discotectonica plicatula (De Cristofori & Jan, 1832)
- † Discotectonica pseudoperspective (Brocchi, 1814)
- † Discotectonica semisquamosa (Bronn, 1831)
- † Discotectonica seniscula (Marwick, 1931)
- † Discotectonica squamogranosa (Chapple, 1941)
- † Discotectonica wangaloiformis Lozouet, 1999
