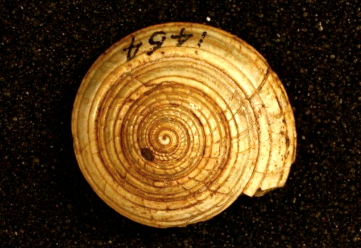
- Shell of Architectonica karsteni

Scientific classification
- Kingdom: Animalia
- Phylum: Mollusca
- Class: Gastropoda
- Family: Architectonicidae
- Genus: Architectonica
- Species: A. karsteni

Binomial name
- Architectonica karsteni Rutsch, 1934

Synonyms
- Architectonica nobilis karsteni Rutsch, 1934 (original rank)

= Architectonica karsteni =

Species of gastropod

Architectonica karsteni is a species of sea snail, a marine gastropod mollusk in the family Architectonicidae, which are known as the staircase shells or sundials.

== Description ==
The diameter of the shell attains 35.2 mm, its height 23.7 mm.

== Distribution ==
This marine species can be found off Venezuela.
