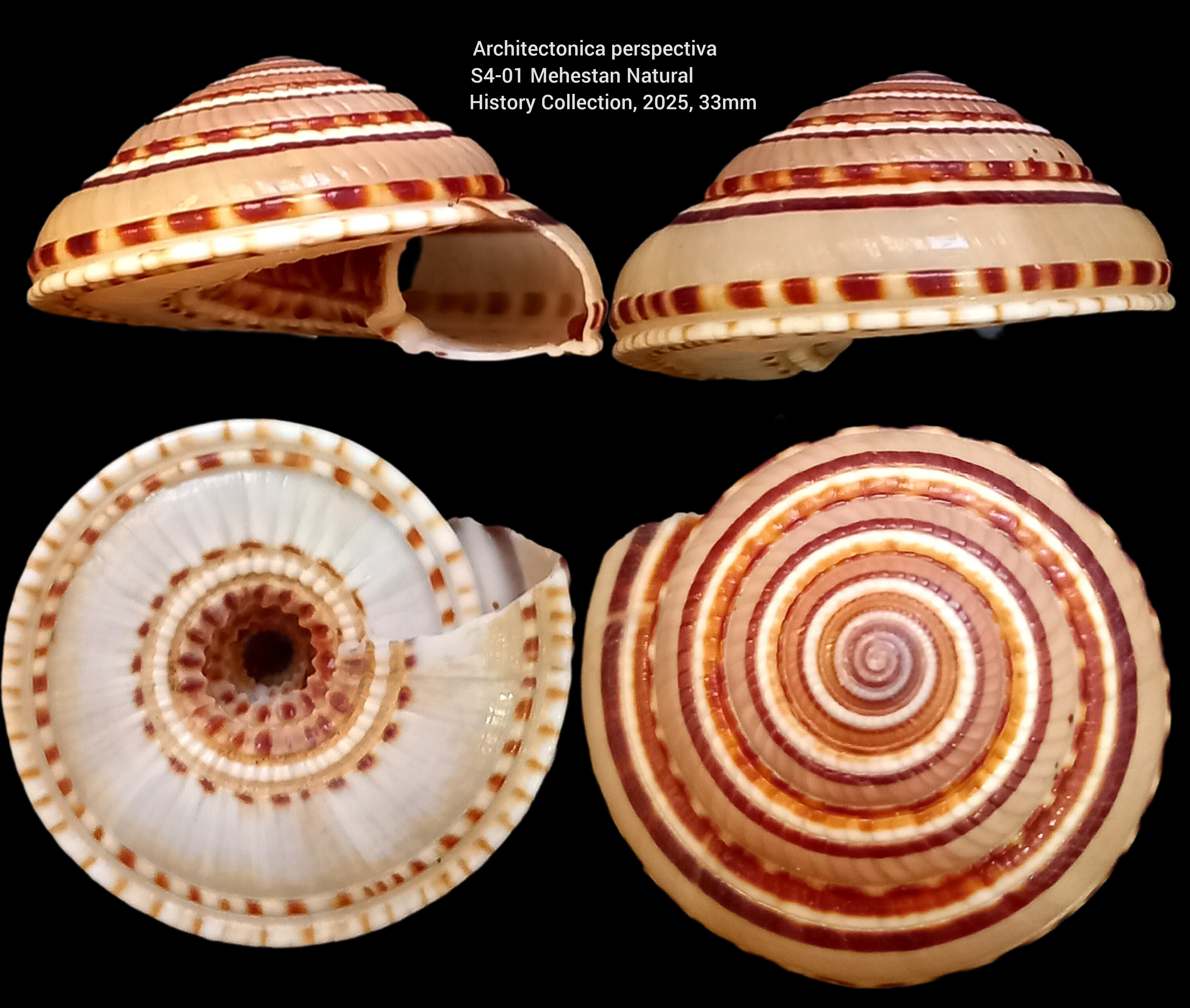
- Architectonica perspectiva

Scientific classification
- Kingdom: Animalia
- Phylum: Mollusca
- Class: Gastropoda
- Family: Architectonicidae
- Genus: Architectonica
- Species: A. perspectiva

Binomial name
- Architectonica perspectiva (Linnaeus, 1758)

Synonyms
- Architectonica perspectiva fressa Iredale, 1936 junior subjective synonym; Solarium (Architectonica) hanleyi G. B. Sowerby II, 1863; Solarium (Architectonica) trisulcatum Jousseaume, 1877; Solarium australe R. A. Philippi, 1849; Solarium cumingii Hanley, 1862; Solarium formosum Hinds, 1844; Solarium fuliginosum Hinds, 1845; Solarium hanleyi G. B. Sowerby II, 1863; Solarium incisum R. A. Philippi, 1849 junior subjective synonym; Solarium maculatum Reeve, 1848; Solarium perspectivum (Linnaeus, 1758); Solarium perspectivum var. heurni C. Bayer, 1940 junior subjective synonym; Solarium striatum J. E. Gray, 1850 junior subjective synonym; Solarium trisulcatum Jousseaume, 1877; Solarium zonatum R. A. Philippi, 1849 junior subjective synonym; Trochus perspectivus Linnaeus, 1758 (original combination)

= Architectonica perspectiva =

Species of gastropod

Architectonica perspectiva, whose common name is the clear or perspective sundial shell, is a species of sea snail, a marine gastropod mollusk in the family Architectonicidae, which are known as the staircase shells or sundials.

Subspecies and variety

- Architectonica perspectiva fressa Iredale, 1936: synonym of Architectonica perspectiva (Linnaeus, 1758) (junior subjective synonym)
- Architectonica perspectiva var. modesta (R. A. Philippi, 1849): synonym of Architectonica modesta (R. A. Philippi, 1849) (superseded rank)

== Description ==
(Original description of Solarium fuliginosum in Latin) The shell is orbiculato-conical, in other words it is essentially a low, depressed cone with a rounded base. The shell is smooth, and adorned with soot-brown coloration. The lower whorls are smooth and somewhat swollen, while the upper whorls are longitudinally folded (plicate). The median area is pale and is painted with broad, oblique brown stripes. It is keeled at the periphery. Above the keel, there is a narrow, flattened area articulated with quadrate brown spots. The base is slightly swollen, pale, and smooth. The aperture is quadrate. The umbilicus is wide-open and is furnished with straight brown crenations.

The snails have a shell 5 to 7 centimeters in diameter. The cone-like shell coils up from a flat base. The spirals are composed of vibrant shades of black, white, and brown. The body and its tentacles are striped as well to match the shell. Its operculum is made of a horn-like material.

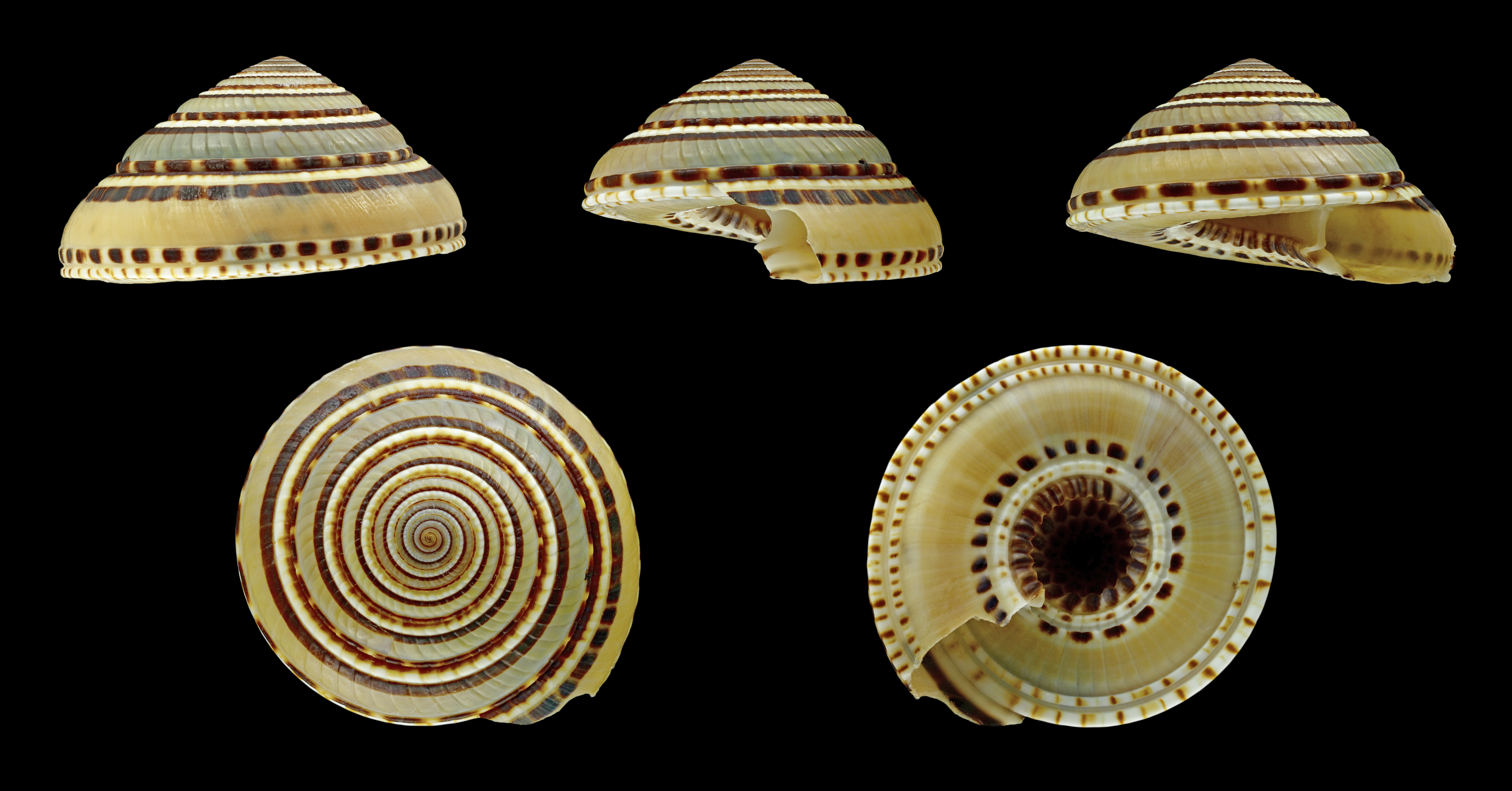
A shell of Architectonica perspectiva.

== Distribution ==
The snail is common in Indo-Pacific Asia and around India. The snail often lives among coral reefs, and enjoys sandy seafloors.

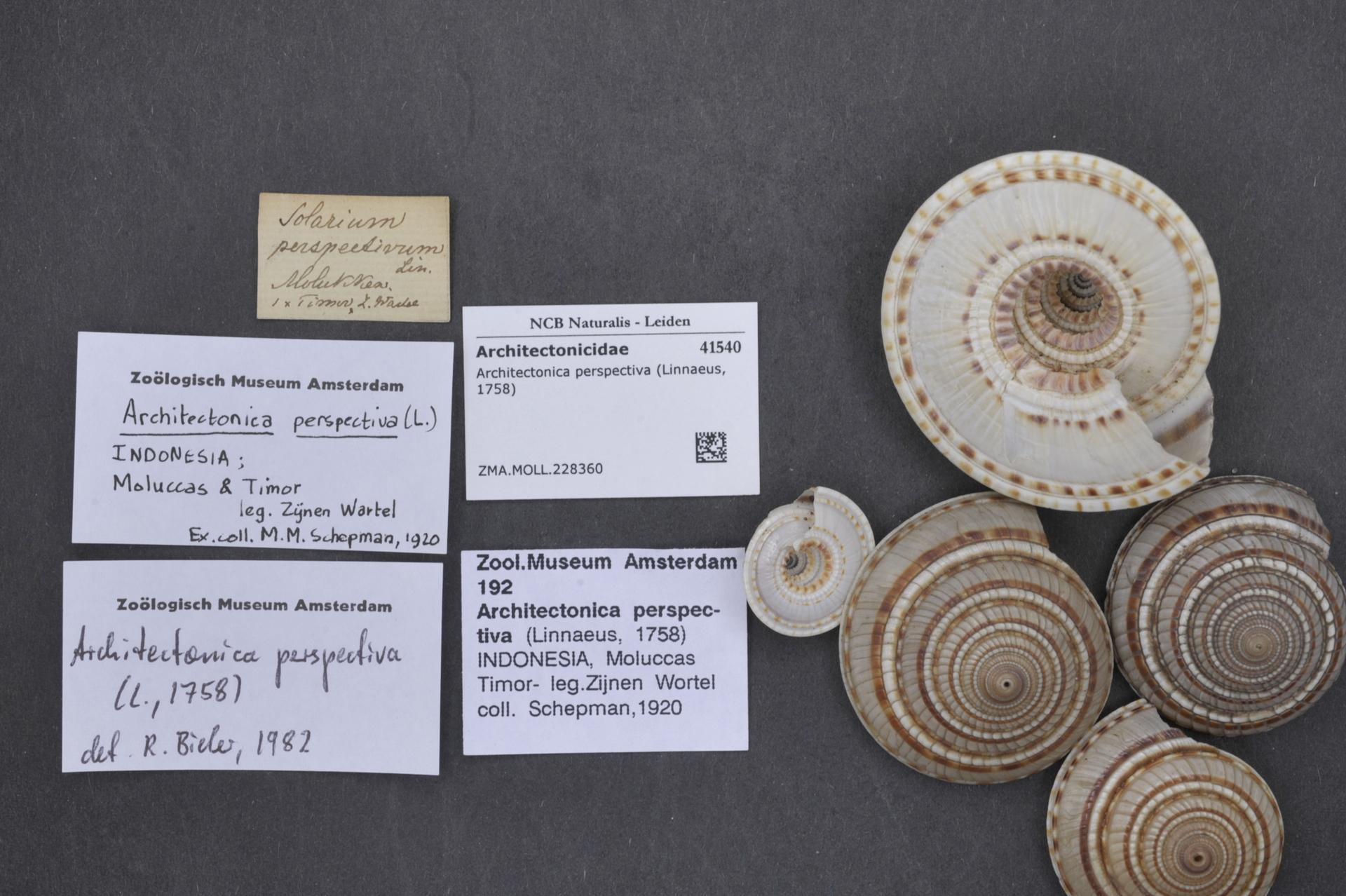
Museum specimens. Naturalis

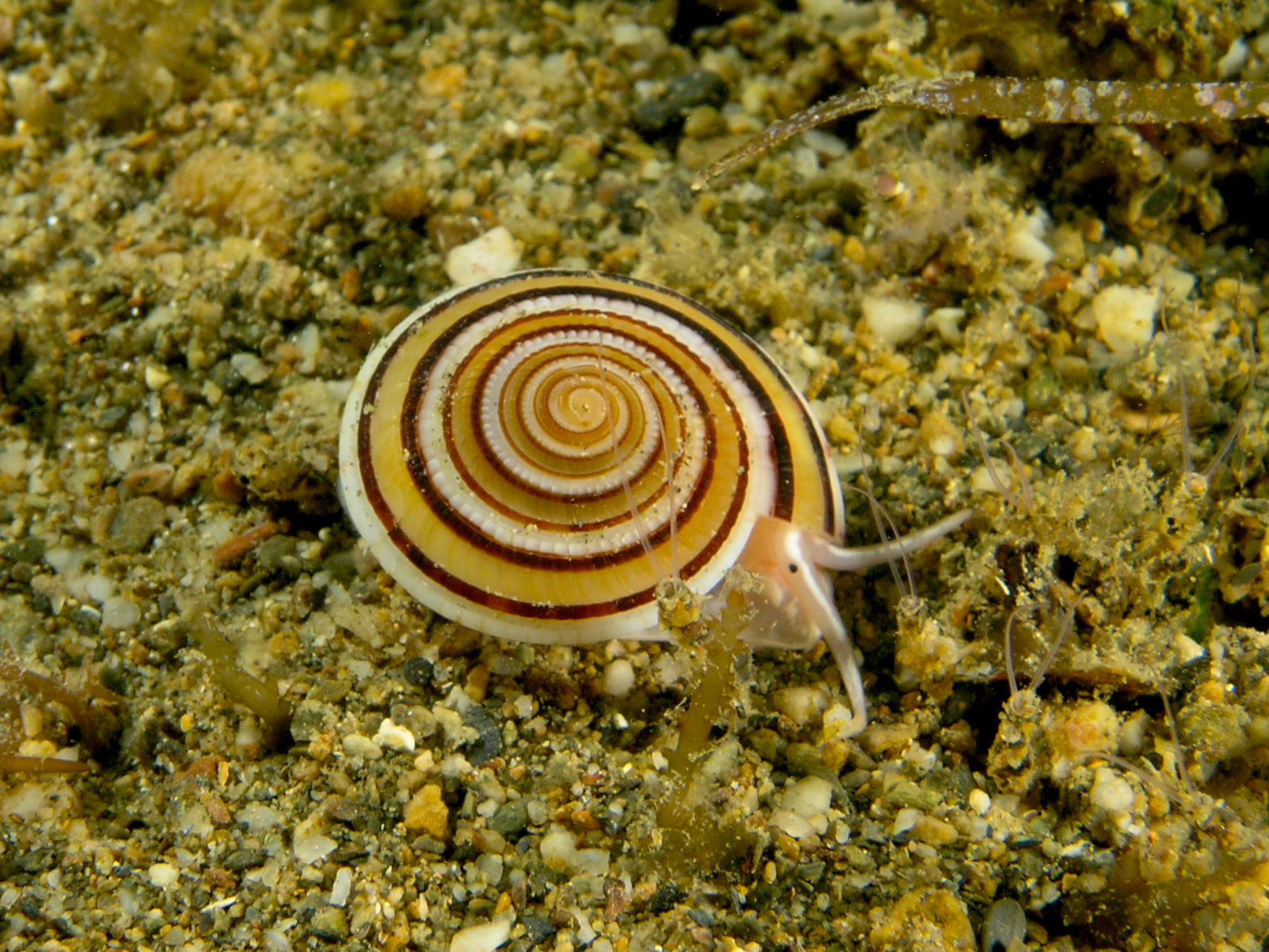
Live individual
