= Girdle (gastropod) =

The term "girdle" (in Latin descriptions: cingulum or cingulus) in the context of a snail shell is a standard malacological term that refers to a raised spiral line or band on the shell's surface. It is a feature of the shell's sculpture and ornamentation. It is used precisely to differentiate and locate the fine details of the shell's texture and color pattern.

In technical malacology, these spiral features are more generally categorized as lirae (fine lines or threads) or carinae (keels or strong ridges), and the term cingulum is used when the feature is broad, belt-like, or serves to divide a section of the whorl

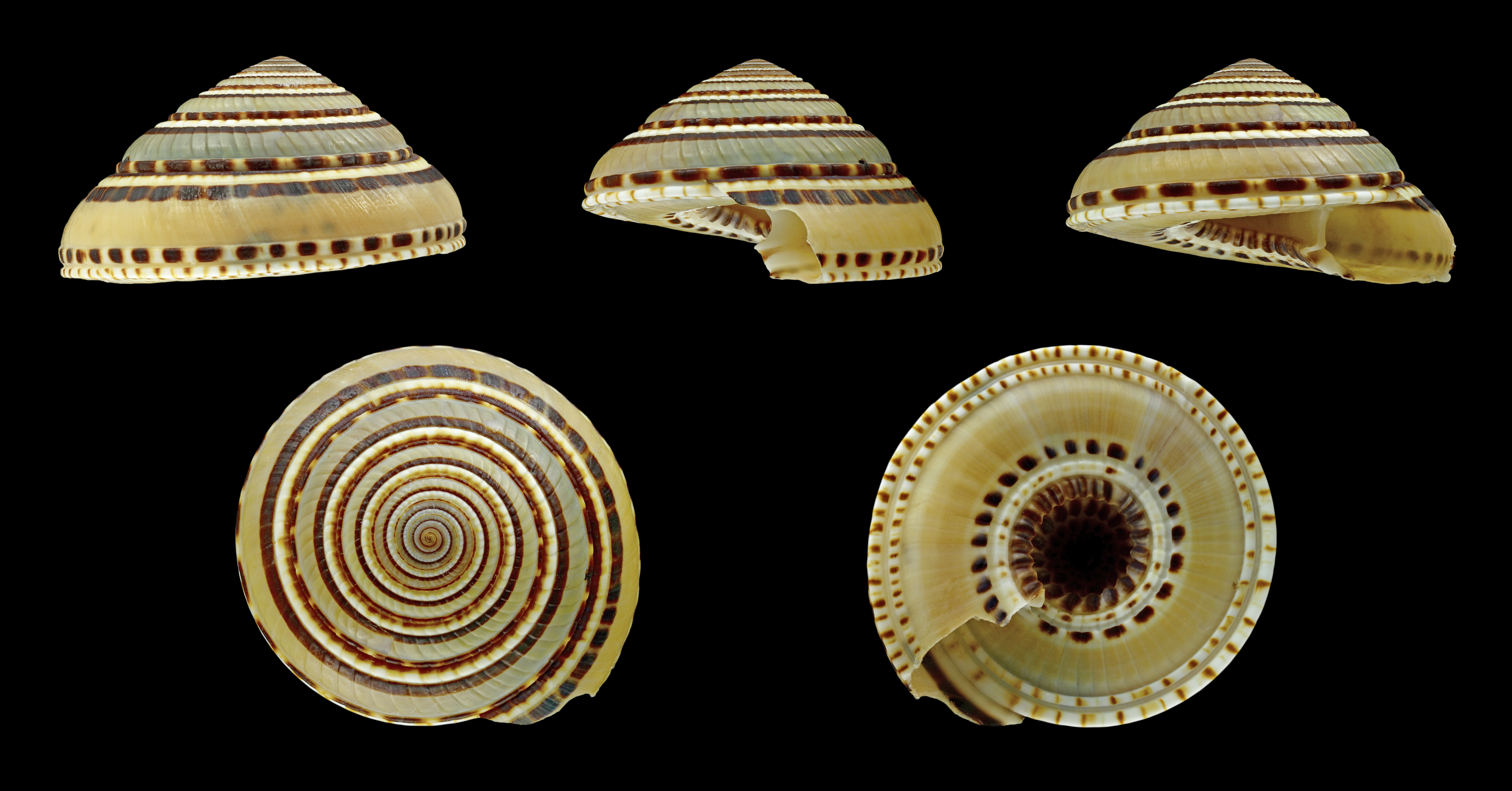
Shell of the perspective sundial shell (Architectonica perspectiva (Linnaeus, 1758) showing the girdles

== Characteristics ==
- Spiral ornamentation: A cingulum is one type of spiral ridge, line, or band that circles the shell's whorls (the coils of the shell).
- Distinct feature: the cingulum is often used to divide or mark specific areas of the whorl and frequently bears its own ornamentation, such as tubercles or crenulations.
- Color band: It can also refer to a distinct band of color circling the shell, even if it isn't noticeably raised as a physical ridge.

== Appearance ==
- Simple girdle: A plain, unornamented spiral line or ridge (lira).
- Zoned girdle: A color band or zone, which may or may not be physically raised.

== Types based on position ==
- Supreme girdle (Latin description: cingulum supremum): refers to the uppermost, or highest, spiral band on a whorl.
- Marginal girdle (Latin description: cingulum marginale): a spiral feature located near the periphery or margin of the whorl.
- Lowest girdles (Latin description: cingulis infimis): refers to the bands near the base of the shell.
- Girdle around the umbilicus (Latin description: cingulo circa umbilicum): a specific, often prominent, band circling the central depression of the shell's base

== Types based on ornamentation and texture ==
- Crenulated girdle (Latin description: cingulo crenulato): a girdle marked by small, rounded projections (crenules) along its edge.
- Granulated girdle (Latin description: cingulis granulatis): a girdle covered in small, grain-like bumps (granules).
- Plicated girdle (Latin description: plico-striatis): while often called striae or plicae (folds), a prominent girdle may be described by this texture, having fine, fold-like striations.
