= Wangaloa =

Coordinates: 46°16′45″S 169°55′45″E

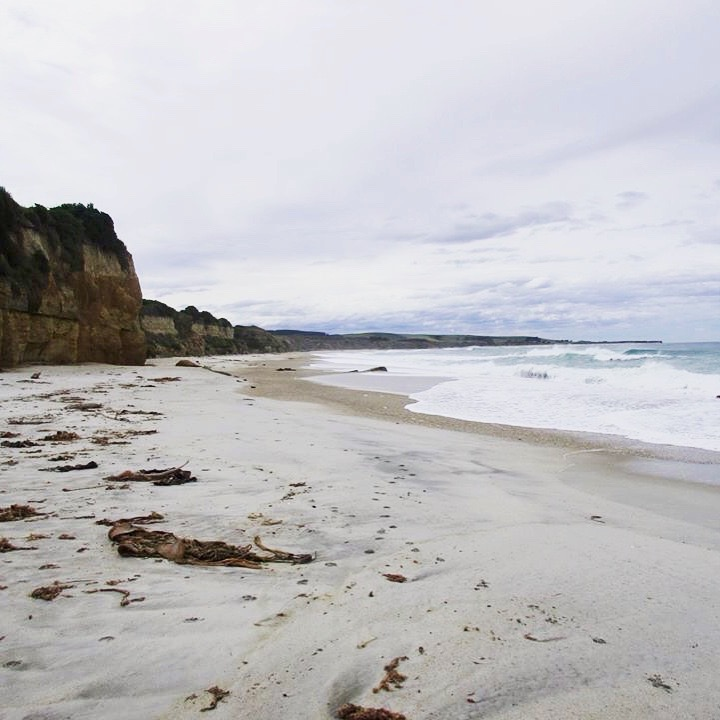
Wangaloa Beach, looking north

Wangaloa is a small coastal settlement in South Otago, New Zealand. It is located to the north of the mouths of the Clutha River the beach area, close to the town of Kaitangata. There is access to Wangaloa Beach from the Kaitangata Golf course. Wangaloa is connected to Toko Mouth, 10 kilometres (6.2 mi) to the north, by a coastal road, and to Kaitangata, 5 kilometres (3.1 mi) to the west, by a road which crests a low range of coastal hills.

The name of Wangaloa is from the southern dialect of Māori, and means long bay (equivalent to Whangaroa in standard Māori).

Wangaloa was home to an open cast coal mine which operated as part of the Kaitangata coal field from 1945 to 1989. The area surrounding the former mine is being extensively re-landscaped as a recreational reserve.
