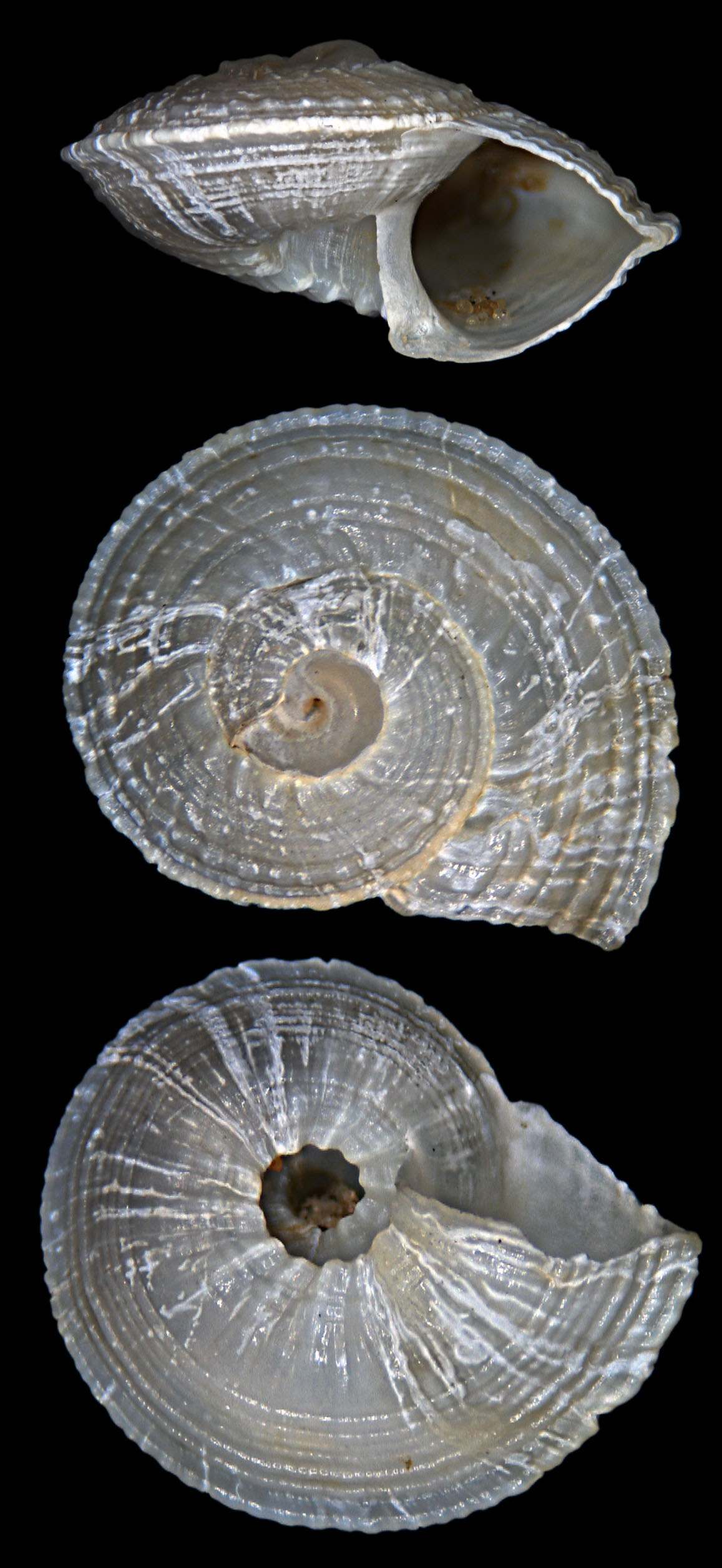
- Solatisonax rudigerbieleri

Scientific classification
- Kingdom: Animalia
- Phylum: Mollusca
- Class: Gastropoda
- Superfamily: Architectonicoidea
- Family: Architectonicidae; Gray, 1850

Genera
- See text

= Architectonicidae =

Family of gastropods

Architectonicidae, common name the staircase shells or sundials, are a family of sea snails, marine gastropod mollusks in the informal group Lower Heterobranchia (= Allogastropoda) of the clade Heterobranchia.

The extinct families † Amphitomariidae Bandel, 1994 and † Cassianaxidae Bandel, 1996 belong to the same superfamily.

== Genera ==
Genera within the family Architectonicidae include:

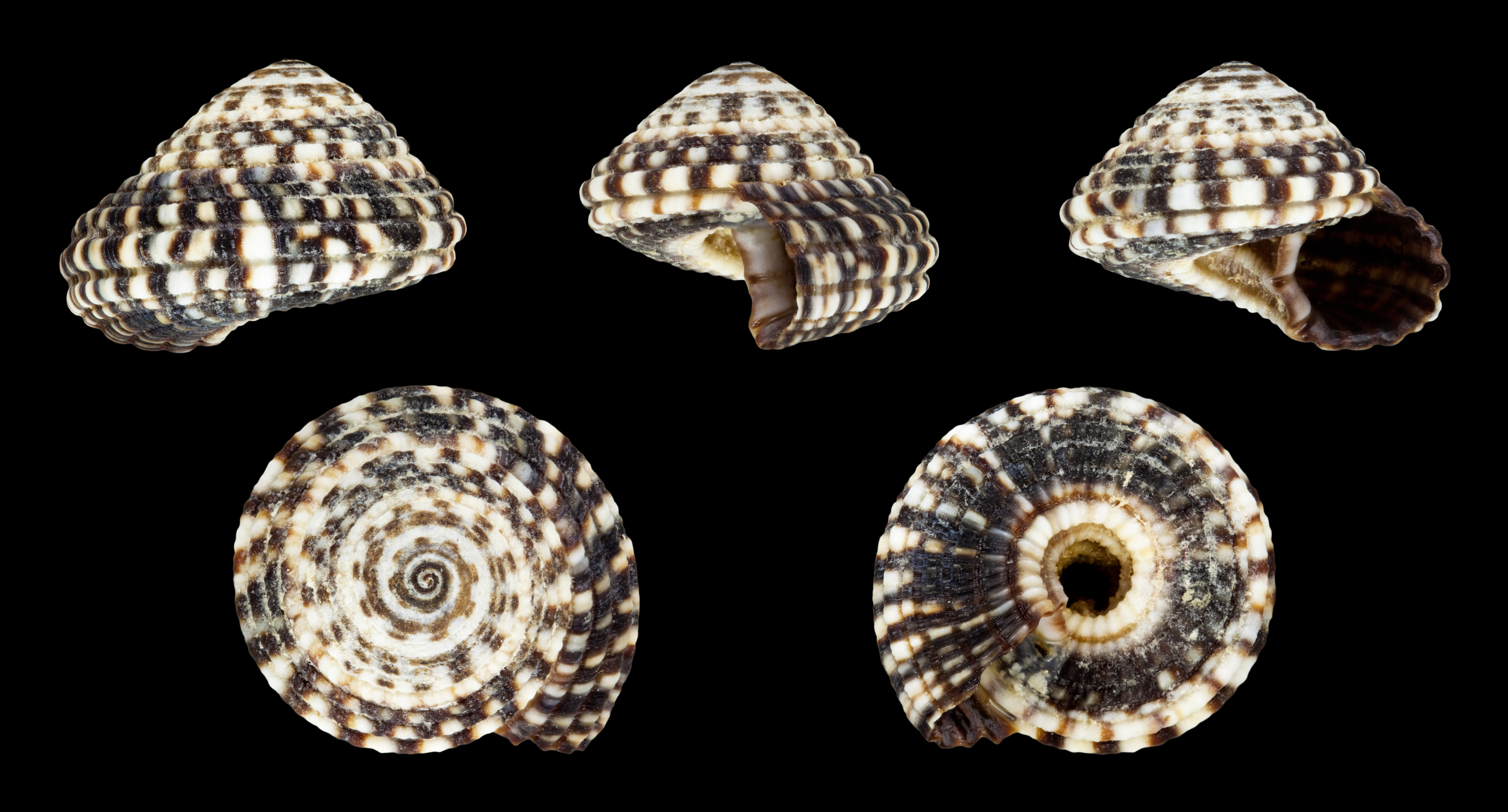
A shell of Heliacus variegatus

- Adelphotectonica Bieler, 1987
- † Ammotectonica Harzhauser & Landau, 2023
- Architectonica Röding, 1798 – type genus
- Basisulcata Melone & Taviani, 1985
- †Calodisculus Rehder, 1935
- †Climacopoma Fischer, 1885
- †Dinaxis Dall in Aldrich, 1895
- †Discotectonica Marwick, 1931
- †Disculus Deshayes, 1863
- †Eosolarium Chavan, 1947
- †Ewekorolaxis Adegoke, 1977
- †Granosolarium Sacco, 1892
- Heliacus d'Orbigny, 1842
- †Intitectonica Frassinetti & Covacevich, 1984
- † Margaritella Meek & Hayden, 1860
- †Nigerialaxis Adegoke, 1977
- †Nipteraxis Cossmann, 1916
- †Nodosolarium Sacco, 1892 as † Solarium (Nodosolarium) Sacco, 1892 (uncertain > unassessed)
- Philippia J. E. Gray, 1847
- †Platylaxis Adegoke, 1977
- Pseudomalaxis P. Fischer, 1885
- †Pseudotorinia Sacco, 1892
- Psilaxis Woodring, 1928
- † Punjabia Eames, 1952
- †Rinaldoconchus Bandel, 1988
- † Simplexollata Harzhauser & Landau, 2023
- Solatisonax Iredale, 1931
- Spirolaxis di Monterosato, 1913
- †Stellaxis Dall, 1892
- †Trimalaxis Garvie, 1996
- †Wangaloa Finlay, 1927

== Synonyms ==
- Acutitectonica Habe, 1961: synonym of Discotectonica Marwick, 1931
- Aguayodiscus Jaume & Borro, 1946: synonym of Spirolaxis Monterosato, 1913
- Astronacus Woodring, 1959: synonym of Heliacus (Torinista) Iredale, 1936
- Awarua Mestayer, 1930: synonym of Pseudotorinia Sacco, 1892 (junior subjective synonym)
- Claraxis Iredale, 1936: synonym of Granosolarium Sacco, 1892
- Discosolis Dall, 1892: synonym of Pseudomalaxis P. Fischer, 1885
- Grandeliacus Iredale, 1957: synonym of Heliacus Iredale, 1957 (alternate representation)
- †Granoheliacus Melone & Taviani, 1985; synonym of Solatisonax Iredale, 1931
- Gyriscus Tiberi, 1867: synonym of Heliacus (Gyriscus) Tiberi, 1867 represented as Heliacus A. d'Orbigny, 1842
- Mangonuia Mestayer, 1930: synonym of Pseudomalaxis P. Fischer, 1885
- †Patulaxis Dall, 1892: synonym of † Climacopoma Fischer, 1885
- Paurodiscus Rehder, 1935: synonym of Spirolaxis Monterosato, 1913
- Pyrgoheliacus Bieler, 1987: synonym of Heliacus A. d'Orbigny, 1842
- Redivivus Melone & Taviani, 1985: synonym of Solatisonax Iredale, 1931
- Russetia Garrard, 1961: synonym of Discotectonica Marwick, 1931
- †Solariaxis Dall, 1892: synonym of Granosolarium Sacco, 1892
- Solarium Lamarck, 1799: synonym of Architectonica Röding, 1798
- Teretropoma Rochebrune, 1881: synonym of Heliacus (Teretropoma) Rochebrune, 1881 (alternate representation) represented as Heliacus A. d'Orbigny, 1842
- Torinia Gray, 1842: synonym of Heliacus d'Orbigny, 1842
- Torinista Iredale, 1936: synonym of Heliacus (Torinista) Iredale, 1936 (alternate representation) represented as Heliacus A. d'Orbigny, 1842 (misspelling - incorrect subsequent spelling, Error for Torinista)
- Tornista [sic] : synonym of Torinia J. E. Gray, 1842: synonym of Heliacus A. d'Orbigny, 1842 (Error for Torinia Gray, 1842)
