= Tuba (gastropod) =

Scientific classification
- Kingdom: Animalia
- Phylum: Mollusca
- Class: Gastropoda
- Infraclass: "Lower Heterobranchia"
- Superfamily: Mathildoidea
- Family: Mathildidae
- Genus: Tuba; I. Lea, 1833

Type species
- † Tuba alternata I. Lea, 1833

Synonyms
- Gegania Jeffreys, 1884 junior subjective synonym; Gegania (Tubena) Marwick, 1943 junior subjective synonym; † Kaitangata H. J. Finlay & Marwick, 1937 junior subjective synonym; Mathilda (Gegania) Jeffreys, 1884 junior subjective synonym; † Mathildella Krjachkova, 1969 junior objective synonym; Tubena Marwick, 1943 junior subjective synonym

Genus of gastropods

Tuba is a genus of sea snails, marine gastropod mollusks in the family Mathildidae.

== Species ==
- † Tuba antarctodema (Stilwell & Zinsmeister, 1992)
- † Tuba antiquata (Conrad, 1833)
- † Tuba austroconvexa (Stilwell & Zinsmeister, 1992)
- Tuba fuscocincta Bieler, 1995
- † Tuba hendersoni (H. J. Finlay & Marwick, 1937)
- Tuba jeffreysi (Dall, 1889)
- Tuba kiiensis (T. Nakayama, 2000)
- † Tuba kuteiana (Beets, 1942)
- † Tuba manzaneti Stephenson, 1941
- † Tuba marylandica W. B. Clark & G. C. Martin, 1901
- † Tuba mississippiensis (Dockery, 1993)
- † Tuba olsoni (P. A. Maxwell, 1969)
- † Tuba parabella Wade, 1926
- Tuba pinguis (Jeffreys, 1884)
- † Tuba rosenkrantzi (Ravn, 1933)
- † Tuba sculpta (J. De C. Sowerby, 1823)
- † Tuba sulcata (Pilkington, 1804)
- Tuba valkyrie (A. W. B. Powell, 1971)
- † Tuba vibrayeana (A. d'Orbigny, 1843)
- † Tuba viola (Marwick, 1943) †

Synonyms

- Tuba (Mathilda) O. Semper, 1865: synonym of Mathilda O. Semper, 1865 (superseded rank)
- † Tuba alternata I. Lea, 1833: synonym of Tuba antiquata (Conrad, 1833) (junior subjective synonym)
- † Tuba cancellata (Grateloup, 1828): synonym of † Pseudotuba cancellata (Grateloup, 1828)
- † Tuba cyclostomoides (Deshayes, 1861): synonym of † Pseudotuba cyclostomoides (Deshayes, 1861)
- † Tuba elatospira Cossmann, 1907: synonym o f† Pseudotuba elatospira (Cossmann, 1907)
- † Tuba pedemontana Sacco, 1895: synonym of † Pseudotuba pedemontana (Sacco, 1895)
