= Tuba valkyrie =

Scientific classification
- Kingdom: Animalia
- Phylum: Mollusca
- Class: Gastropoda
- Infraclass: "Lower Heterobranchia"
- Superfamily: Mathildoidea
- Family: Mathildidae
- Genus: Tuba (gastropod) (A. W. B. Powell, 1971)

Synonyms
- Gegania valkyrie A. W. B. Powell, 1971 (superseded combination)

Genus of gastropods

Tuba is a genus of sea snails, marine gastropod mollusks in the family Mathildidae.

== Description ==
The shellof the holotype measures 14.25 mm in height and 9.0 mm in width.

(Original description) The shell is broadly conical, thin, and white, with gently rounded whorls that become broadly but only weakly angulated at the periphery of the body whorl. The aperture is squarish and possesses a thin outer lip, while the columella forms a straight, vertical pillar with a thin, broadly reflected outer edge that becomes slightly effuse basally.

The protoconch is small, planorbid, and strongly tilted, comprising approximately one whorl. The post-nuclear whorls bear a delicate spiral sculpture. Early whorls display four narrow spiral cords above a weak angulation situated at less than one-third of the whorl height, together with two stronger cords below it. Additional cords arise through interpolation, increasing the number to eight above and four below the angulation on the penultimate whorl.

Numerous fine axial threads cross the entire shell surface and weakly crenulate the spiral cords. Stronger corded sculpture extends across the base, which remains imperforate.

== Distribution ==
This marine species occurs in the Indo-West Pacific and off New Caledonia and New Zealand (North island).
