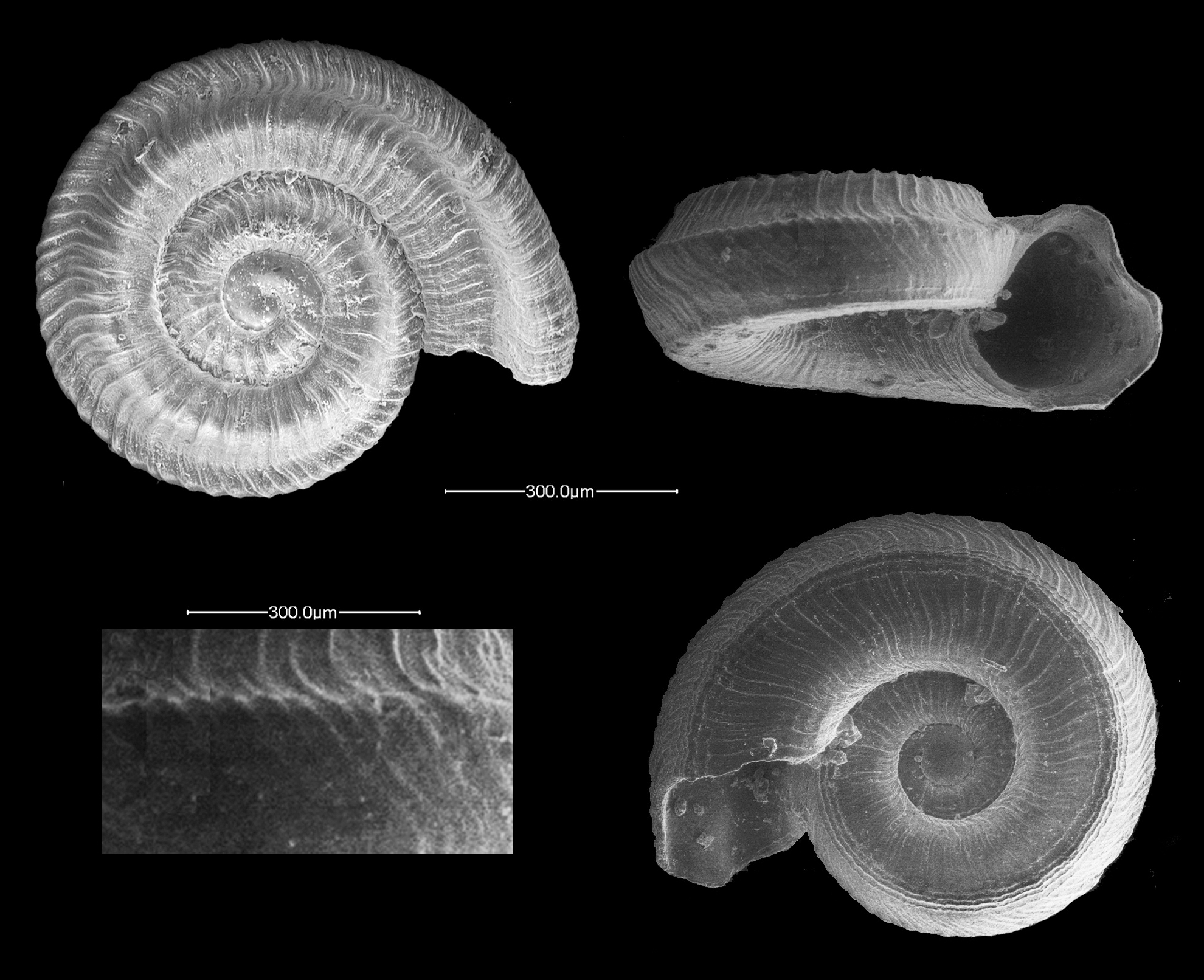
- Shell of Orbitestella radiata (paratype at MNHN, Paris)

Scientific classification
- Kingdom: Animalia
- Phylum: Mollusca
- Class: Gastropoda
- Infraclass: "Lower Heterobranchia"
- Superfamily: Orbitestelloidea
- Family: Orbitestellidae
- Genus: Orbitestella; Iredale, 1917

Type species
- Cyclostrema bastowi Gatliff, 1906

Synonyms
- † Omalogyra (Omalogyrina) Magne & Vergneau-Saubade, 1973 (unavailable name: no diagnosis, no type species designation); † Orbitestella (Omalogyrina) Magne & Vergneau-Saubade, 1973

= Orbitestella =

Genus of gastropods

Orbitestella is a genus of sea snails, marine gastropod mollusks in the family Orbitestellidae.

== Species ==
- Orbitestella aequicostata Raines, 2002
- Orbitestella bastowi (Gatliff, 1906)
- Orbitestella bermudezi (Aguayo & Borro, 1946)
- Orbitestella cordarta Rubio & Rolán, 2021
- Orbitestella cubana Rolán & Rubio, 1992
- Orbitestella dariae (Liuzzi & Zucchi Stolfa, 1979)
- Orbitestella decorata Laseron, 1954
- Orbitestella diegensis (Bartsch, 1907)
- † Orbitestella dioi Hybertsen & Kiel, 2018
- Orbitestella ellenstrongae Rubio & Rolán, 2021
- Orbitestella fijiensis Rubio & Rolán, 2021
- Orbitestella furtiva Rolán, Rubio & Letourneux, 2020
- Orbitestella gemmulata (W. H. Turton, 1932)
- † Orbitestella granulata Lozouet, 1998
- Orbitestella hinemoa Mestayer, 1919
- Orbitestella marquesensis Rubio & Rolán, 2021
- Orbitestella media Rubio & Rolán, 2021
- Orbitestella nova Rolán, Rubio & Letourneux, 2020
- Orbitestella pacifica Rubio & Rolán, 2021
- † Orbitestella palaiopacifica Squires & Goedert, 1996
- Orbitestella papuaensis Rubio & Rolán, 2021
- Orbitestella parva (Finlay, 1924)
- Orbitestella patagonica Simone & Zelaya, 2004
- Orbitestella peculiaris Rubio & Rolán, 2021
- Orbitestella perlata (Pelseneer, 1903)
- † Orbitestella planibasis (Gougerot & Le Renard, 1978)
- † Orbitestella plicatella (Cossmann, 1888)
- † Orbitestella ponderi Linse, 2002
- † Orbitestella praehinemoa Laws, 1939
- Orbitestella praetoreuma Laws, 1939
- Orbitestella pruinosa Ortega & Gofas, 2019
- Orbitestella radiata Rolán, Rubio & Letourneux, 2020
- Orbitestella regina Kay, 1979
- Orbitestella sarsi (Bush, 1897)
- Orbitestella similis Rolán & Rubio, 1992
- Orbitestella toreuma Powell, 1930
- Orbitestella vanuatuensis Rubio & Rolán, 2021
- Orbitestella wareni Ponder, 1990

Species brought into synonymy

- Orbitestella mayii (Tate, 1899): synonym of Microcarina mayii (Tate, 1899)
- Orbitestella vera Powell, 1940: synonym of Orbitestella parva (Finlay, 1924)
