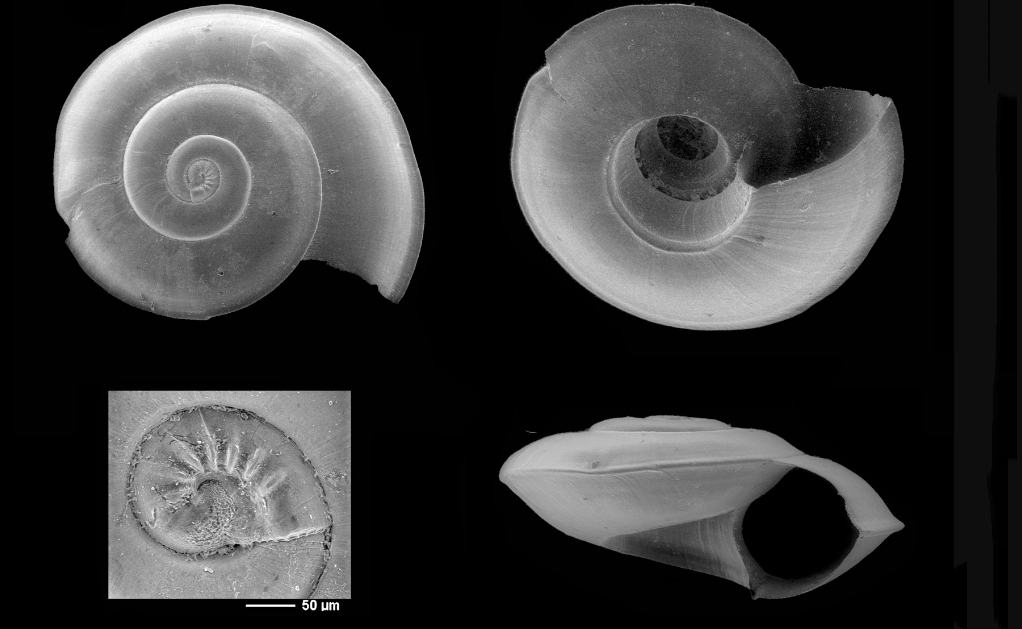
- Shell of Absonus primus

Scientific classification
- Kingdom: Animalia
- Phylum: Mollusca
- Class: Gastropoda
- Infraclass: "Lower Heterobranchia"
- Superfamily: Orbitestelloidea
- Family: Orbitestellidae
- Genus: Absonus; Rubio & Rolán, 2021

Type species
- Absonus primus Rubio & Rolán, 2021

= Absonus =

Genus of gastropods

Absonus is a genus of sea snail, a cowry, a marine gastropod mollusk in the family Orbitestellidae.

== Species ==
- Absonus primus Rubio & Rolán, 2021
