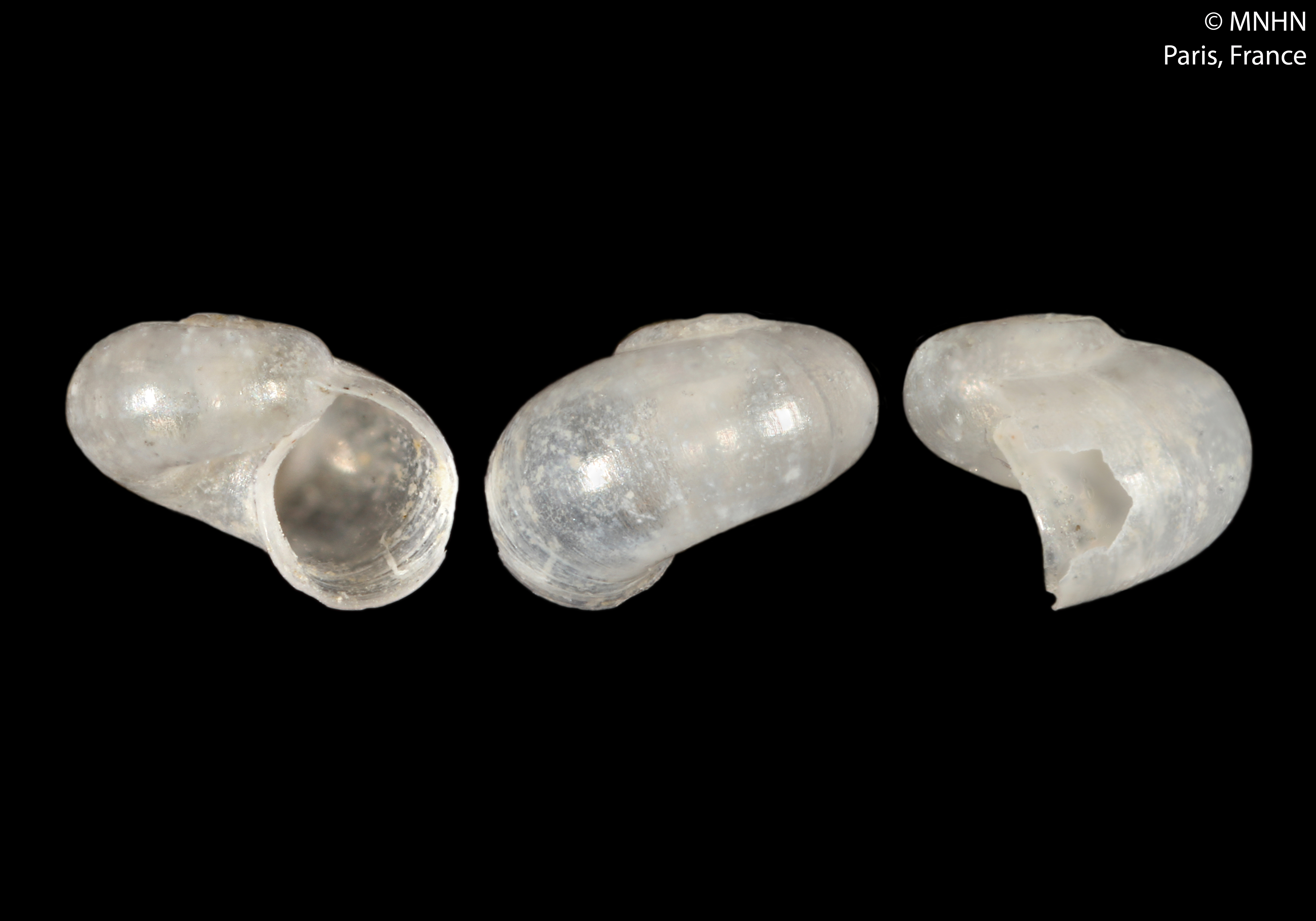
- Shell of Tomura rubiorolanorum (holotype at MNHN, Paris)

Scientific classification
- Kingdom: Animalia
- Phylum: Mollusca
- Class: Gastropoda
- Infraclass: "Lower Heterobranchia"
- Superfamily: Valvatoidea
- Family: Cornirostridae
- Genus: Tomura; Pilsbry & McGinty, 1946

Type species
- Vitrinella bicaudata Pilsbry & McGinty, 1946

= Tomura =

Genus of gastropods

Tomura is a genus of sea snails, marine gastropod mollusks in the family Cornirostridae.

== Species ==
- Tomura abscondita Rolán & Rubio, 1999
- Tomura apextruncata Rubio, Rolán & Fernández-Garcés, 2013
- Tomura aqabaensis Bandel, 2010
- Tomura bicaudata (Pilsbry & McGinty, 1946)
- Tomura depressa (Granata Grillo, 1877)
- Tomura himeshima H. Fukuda & Yamashita, 1997
- † Tomura jekelii (Bandel, 2010)
- † Tomura pacheia Lozouet, Lesport & Renard, 2001
- Tomura rubiorolanorum Romani & Sbrana, 2016
- Tomura sphaerica Rolán & Rubio, 2008
- Tomura umbiliobsessa Rolán & Rubio, 2008
- Tomura urdunica (Bandel, 2010)
- Tomura xenoskeneoides Rubio & Rolán, 1998
- Tomura yashima H. Fukuda & Yamashita, 1997
