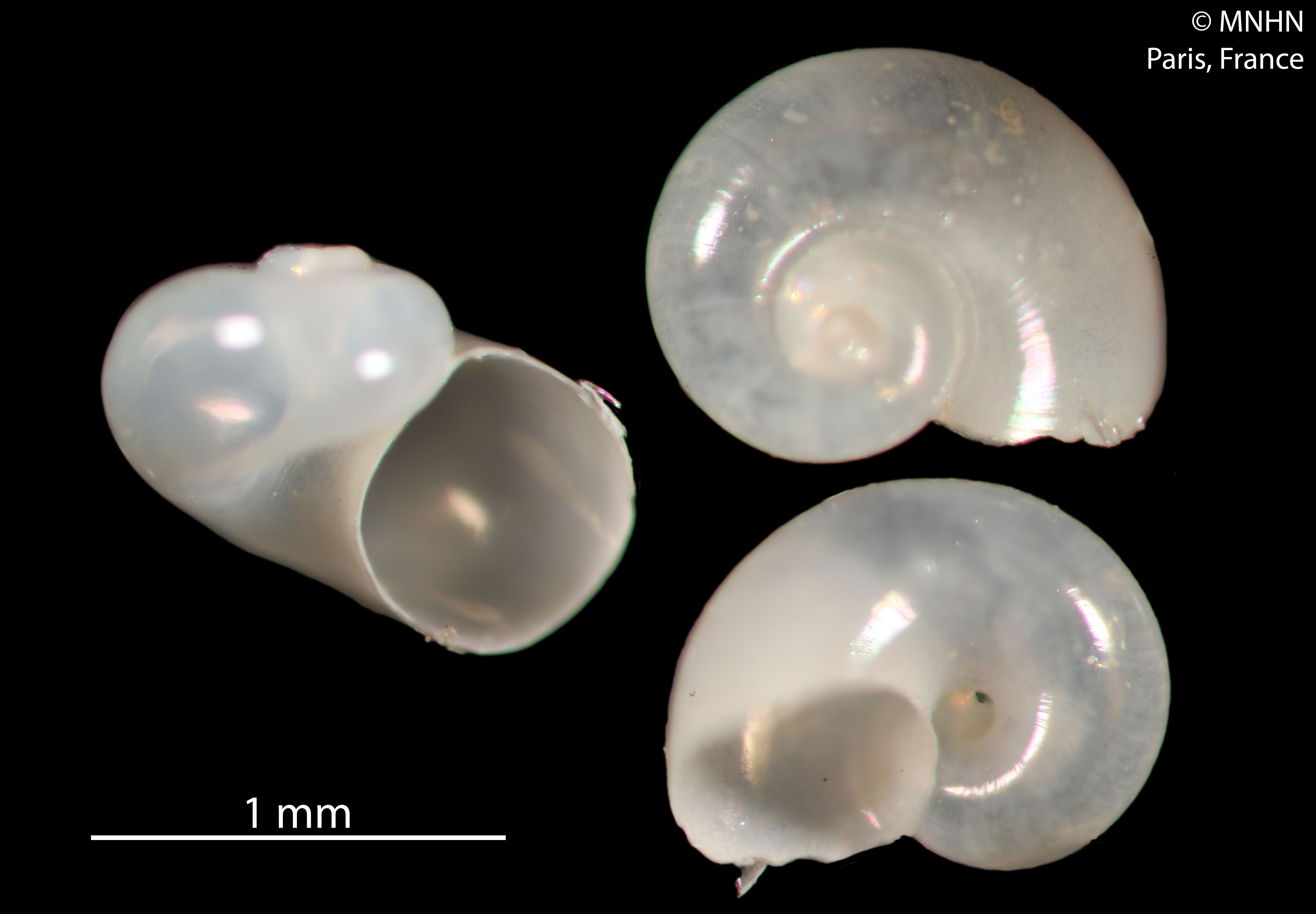
- Shell of Hyalogyrina glabra (paratype at MNHN, Paris)

Scientific classification
- Kingdom: Animalia
- Phylum: Mollusca
- Class: Gastropoda
- Infraclass: "Lower Heterobranchia"
- Superfamily: Valvatoidea
- Family: Hyalogyrinidae
- Genus: Hyalogyrina; B. A. Marshall, 1988

Type species
- Hyalogyrina glabra B. A. Marshall, 1988

= Hyalogyrina =

Genus of gastropods

Hyalogyrina is a genus of sea snails, marine gastropod mollusks in the family Hyalogyrinidae.

== Species ==
Species within the genus Hyalogyrina include:

- Hyalogyrina amphorae Warén, Carrozza & Rocchini, 1997
- Hyalogyrina depressa Hasegawa, 1997
- Hyalogyrina glabra B. A. Marshall, 1988
- Hyalogyrina globularis Warén & Bouchet, 2001
- Hyalogyrina grasslei Warén & Bouchet, 1993
- † Hyalogyrina knorringfjelletensis Kaim, Hryniewic, Little & Nakrem, 2017
- Hyalogyrina rissoella Warén & Bouchet, 2009
- Hyalogyrina umbellifera Warén & Bouchet, 2001
