= Glacidorbis =

Scientific classification
- Kingdom: Animalia
- Phylum: Mollusca
- Class: Gastropoda
- Family: Glacidorbidae
- Genus: Glacidorbis; Iredale, 1943

Genus of gastropods

Glacidorbis is a genus of minute freshwater snails with an operculum, aquatic gastropod molluscs or micromolluscs in the family Glacidorbidae.

This genus has proved to be somewhat enigmatic in terms of where it belongs within the taxonomy of the gastropods. It was previously thought to belong in the family Hydrobiidae or even in the Basommatophora.

== Species ==
Species within the genus Glacidorbis include:

- Glacidorbis atrophus Ponder & Avern, 2000
- Glacidorbis bicarinatus Ponder & Avern, 2000
- Glacidorbis catomus Ponder & Avern, 2000
- Glacidorbis circulus Ponder & Avern, 2000
- Glacidorbis costatus Ponder & Avern, 2000
- Glacidorbis decoratus Ponder & Avern, 2000
- Glacidorbis hedleyi Iredale, 1943 — the type species
- Glacidorbis isolatus Ponder & Avern, 2000
- Glacidorbis occidentalis Bunn & Stoddart, 1983
- Glacidorbis otwayensis Ponder & Avern, 2000
- Glacidorbis rusticus Ponder & Avern, 2000
- Glacidorbis tasmanicus Ponder & Avern, 2000
- Glacidorbis troglodytes Ponder & Avern, 2000

Transferred to other taxa:

- Glacidorbis pawpela Smith, 1979 is a synonym for Benthodorbis pawpela
- Glacidorbis pedderi (Smith, 1973) is a synonym for Striadorbis pedderi
- Glacidorbis magallanicus Meier-Brook et Smith, 1976 is a synonym for Gondwanorbis magallanicus (Meier-Brook et Smith, 1976)
