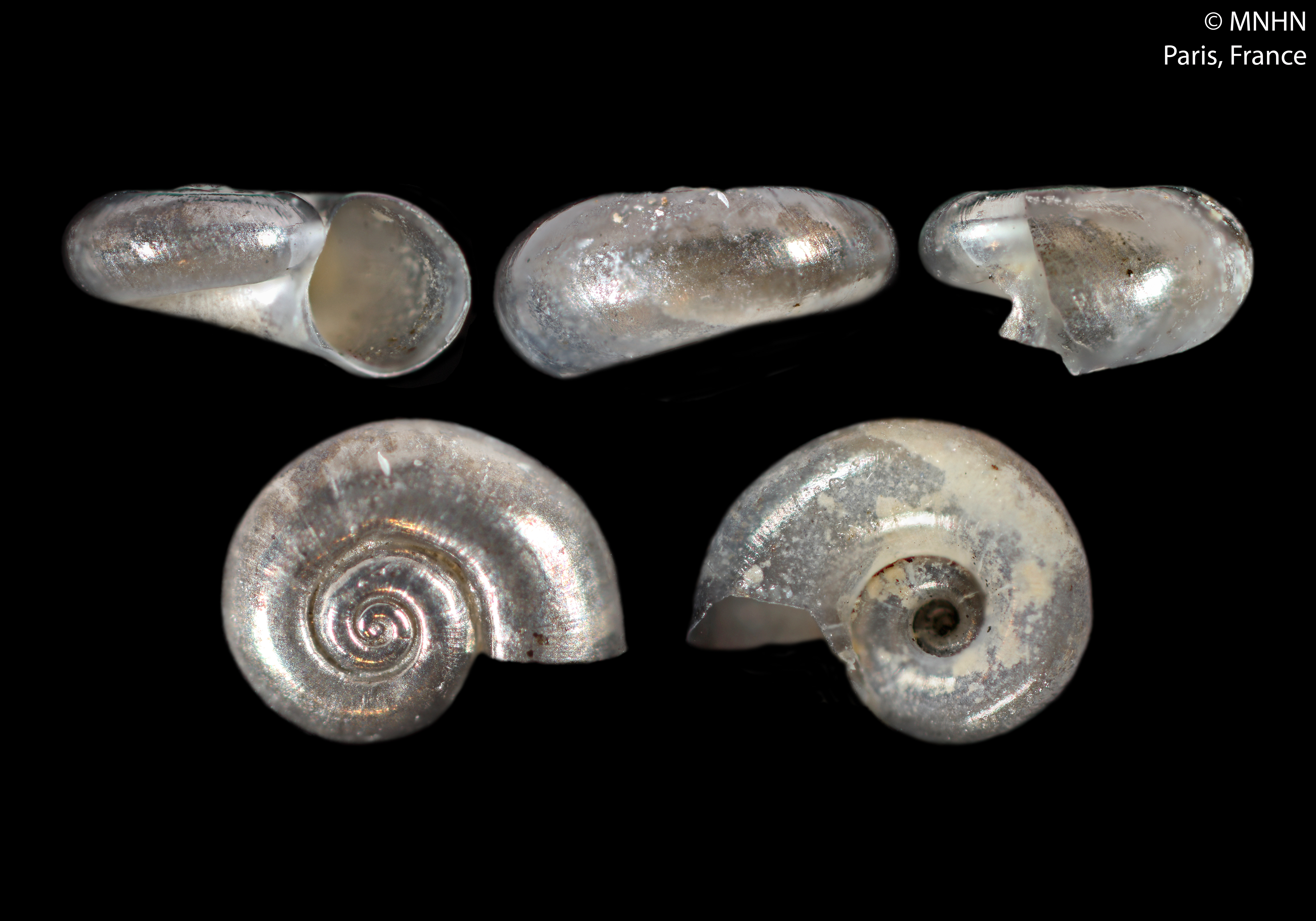
- Xylodiscula boucheti

Scientific classification
- Kingdom: Animalia
- Phylum: Mollusca
- Class: Gastropoda
- Infraclass: "Lower Heterobranchia"
- Superfamily: Orbitestelloidea
- Family: Xylodisculidae
- Genus: Xylodiscula; B.A. Marshall, 1988

Type species
- Xylodiscula vitrea B.A. Marshall, 1988

= Xylodiscula =

Genus of gastropods

Xylodiscula is a genus of sea snails, marine gastropod molluscs in the family Xylodisculidae.

== Species ==
According to the World Register of Marine Species, the following species are included in the genus Xylodiscula

- Xylodiscula analoga Warén & Bouchet, 2001
- Xylodiscula boucheti Warén, Carrozza & Rocchini in Warén, 1992
- Xylodiscula eximia B. A. Marshall, 1988
- Xylodiscula lens Warén, 1992
- Xylodiscula librata B. A. Marshall, 1988
- Xylodiscula major Warén & Bouchet, 1993
- Xylodiscula osteophila B. A. Marshall, 1994
- Xylodiscula planata Høisæter & Johanessen, 2001
- Xylodiscula vitrea B.A. Marshall, 1988
- Xylodiscula wareni Bogi & Bartolini, 2008
