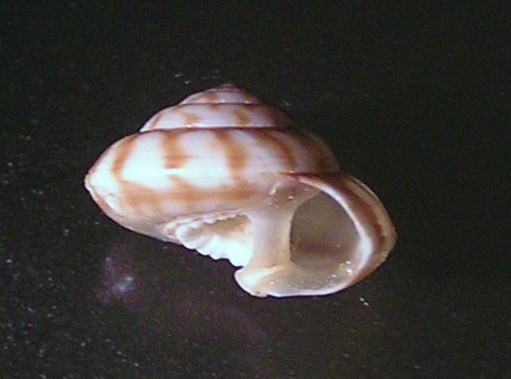
- An empty shell of Psilaxis oxytropis

Scientific classification
- Kingdom: Animalia
- Phylum: Mollusca
- Class: Gastropoda
- Infraclass: "Lower Heterobranchia"
- Superfamily: Architectonicoidea
- Family: Architectonicidae
- Genus: Psilaxis; Woodring, 1928

= Psilaxis =

Genus of gastropods

Psilaxis is a genus of sea snails, marine gastropod molluscs in the family Architectonicidae, the staircase shells or sundials.

== Species ==
Species within the genus Psilaxis include:

- Psilaxis clertoni Tenório, Barros, Francisco & Silva, 2011
- Psilaxis krebsii (Mörch, 1875)
- Psilaxis oxytropis (A. Adams, 1855)
- Psilaxis radiatus (Röding, 1798)
