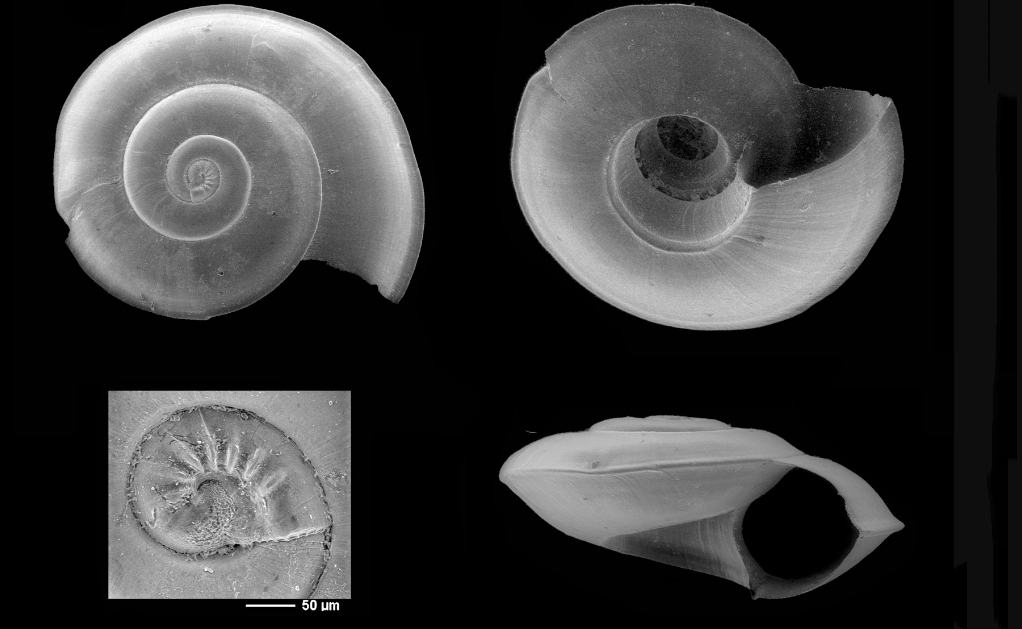
- Shell of Absonus primus (holotype at MNHN, Paris)

Scientific classification
- Kingdom: Animalia
- Phylum: Mollusca
- Class: Gastropoda
- Superfamily: Orbitestelloidea
- Family: Orbitestellidae
- Genus: Absonus
- Species: A. primus

Binomial name
- Absonus primus Rubio & Rolán, 2021

= Absonus primus =

Species of mollusc

Absonus primus is a species of sea snail, a marine gastropoda mollusk in the family Orbitestellidae.

== Distribution ==
This marine species occurs off the Loyalty Islands.
