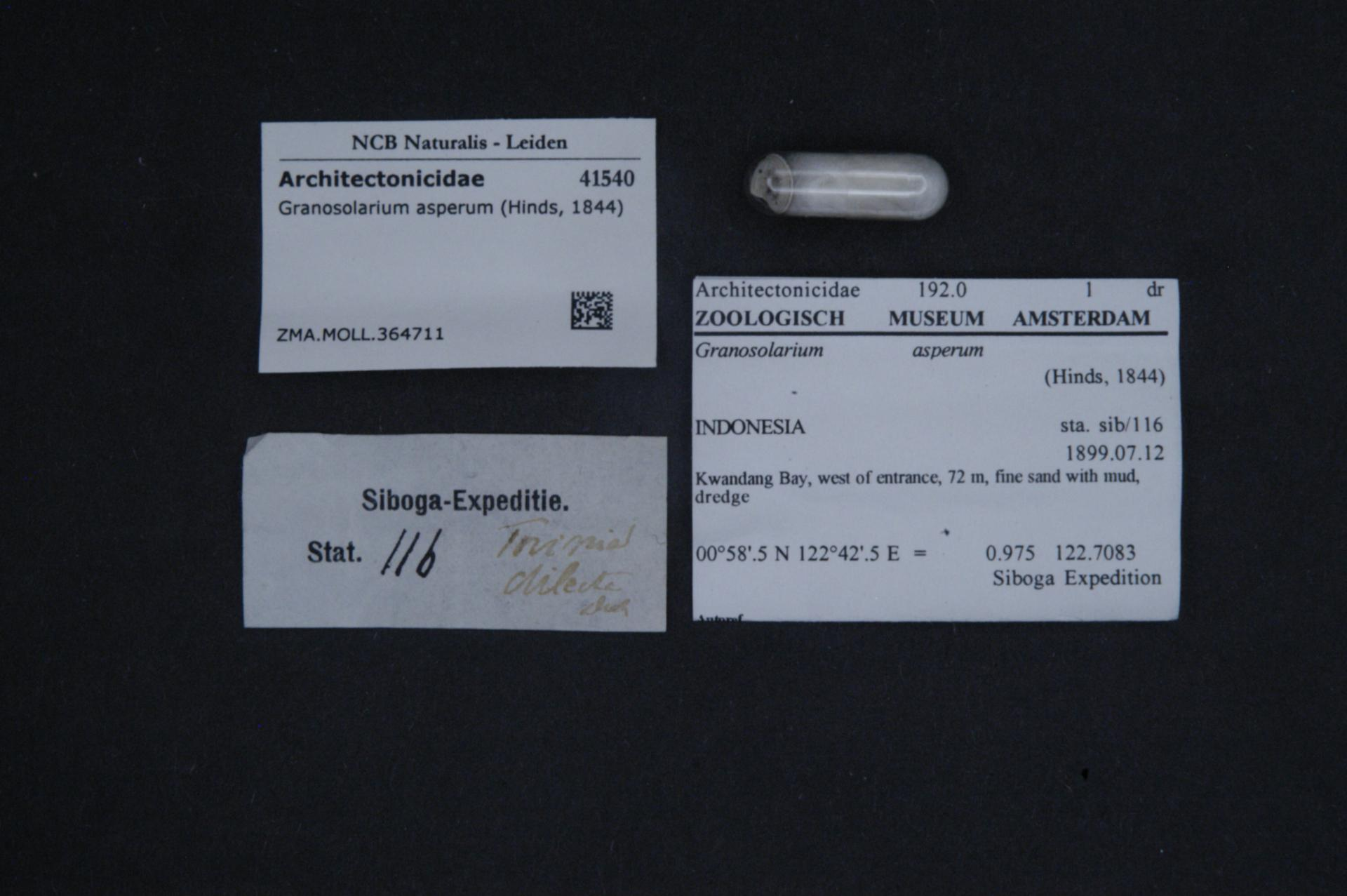

Scientific classification
- Kingdom: Animalia
- Phylum: Mollusca
- Class: Gastropoda
- Superfamily: Architectonicoidea
- Family: Architectonicidae
- Genus: Granosolarium
- Species: G. asperum

Binomial name
- Granosolarium asperum (Hinds, 1844)

= Granosolarium asperum =

Species of gastropod

Granosolarium asperum is a species of snail. It was first described by Richard Brinsley Hinds in 1844.

== Type locality ==
"contained in Indonesian part of the Makassar"

== Name ==
Granosolarium asperum

=== Parent ===
- Granosolarium Sacco, 1892

=== Original name ===
- Solarium asperum Hinds, 1844

=== Synonymised names ===
- Architectonica aspera (Hinds, 1844)
- Claraxis illustris Iredale, 1936
- Heliacus asper (Hinds, 1844)
- Heliacus dilecta (Deshayes, 1863)
- Mangonuia kerensis Ladd, 1982
- Solarium (Torinia) admirandum Melvill & Standen, 1903
- Solarium dilectum Deshayes, 1863
- Torinia aspera (Hinds, 1844)
