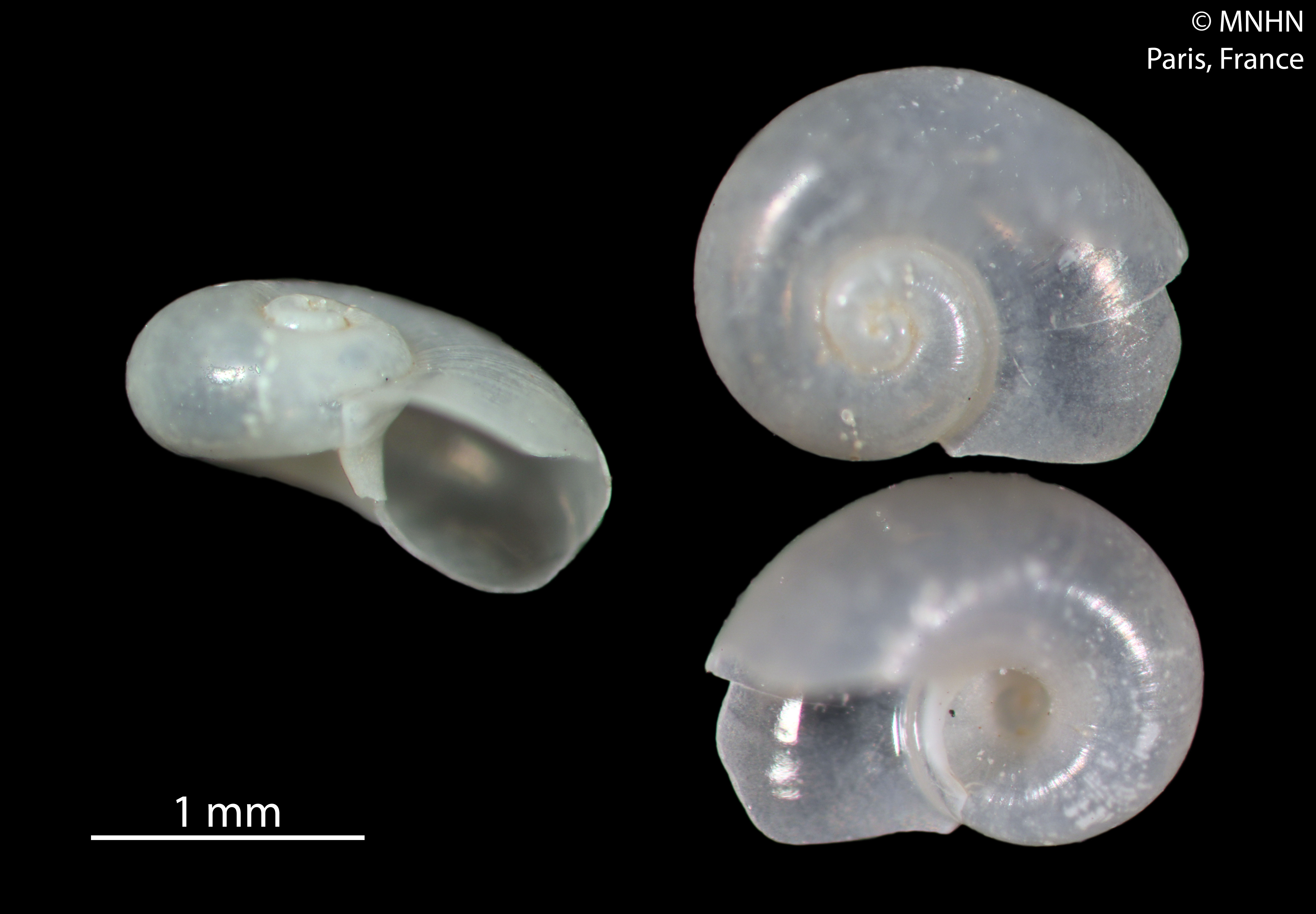
- Shell of Hyalogyra expansa (paratype at MNHN, Paris)

Scientific classification
- Kingdom: Animalia
- Phylum: Mollusca
- Class: Gastropoda
- Infraclass: "Lower Heterobranchia"
- Superfamily: Valvatoidea
- Family: Hyalogyrinidae
- Genus: Hyalogyra; B. A. Marshall, 1988

Type species
- Hyalogyra expansa B. A. Marshall, 1988

= Hyalogyra =

Genus of gastropods

Hyalogyra is a genus of sea snails, marine gastropod mollusks in the family Hyalogyrinidae.

== Species ==
Species within the genus Hyalogyra include:

- Hyalogyra expansa B. A. Marshall, 1988
- Hyalogyra necrophaga Rubio, Rolán & Femándes, 1992
- Hyalogyra vitrinelloides Warén & Bouchet, 1993
- Hyalogyra zibrowii Warén in Warén, Carrozza & Rocchini, 1997
