= Turbonilla postacuticostata =

Scientific classification
- Kingdom: Animalia
- Phylum: Mollusca
- Class: Gastropoda
- Family: Pyramidellidae
- Genus: Turbonilla
- Species: T. postacuticostata

Binomial name
- Turbonilla postacuticostata Sacco, 1892

Synonyms
- Odostomia acuticostata Jeffreys, 1884; Turbonilla acuticostata (Jeffteys, 1884)

Species of gastropod

Turbonilla postacuticostata is a species of sea snail, a marine gastropod mollusk in the family Pyramidellidae, the pyrams and their allies.

== Distribution ==
This species occurs in the following locations:

- European waters (ERMS scope)
