= Glacidorbis hedleyi =

Conservation status
- Least Concern (IUCN 3.1)

Scientific classification
- Kingdom: Animalia
- Phylum: Mollusca
- Class: Gastropoda
- Family: Glacidorbidae
- Genus: Glacidorbis
- Species: G. hedleyi

Binomial name
- Glacidorbis hedleyi Iredale, 1943

Species of gastropod

Glacidorbis hedleyi is a species of small freshwater snail with an operculum, an aquatic gastropod mollusc or micromollusc in the family Glacidorbidae.

Glacidorbis hedleyi is the type species of the genus Glacidorbis.

The type locality is Blue Lake, Mount Kosciuszko, New South Wales, Australia.

The shape of the shell is planispiral. The width of the shell is 2 mm, rarely up to 2.8 mm.
