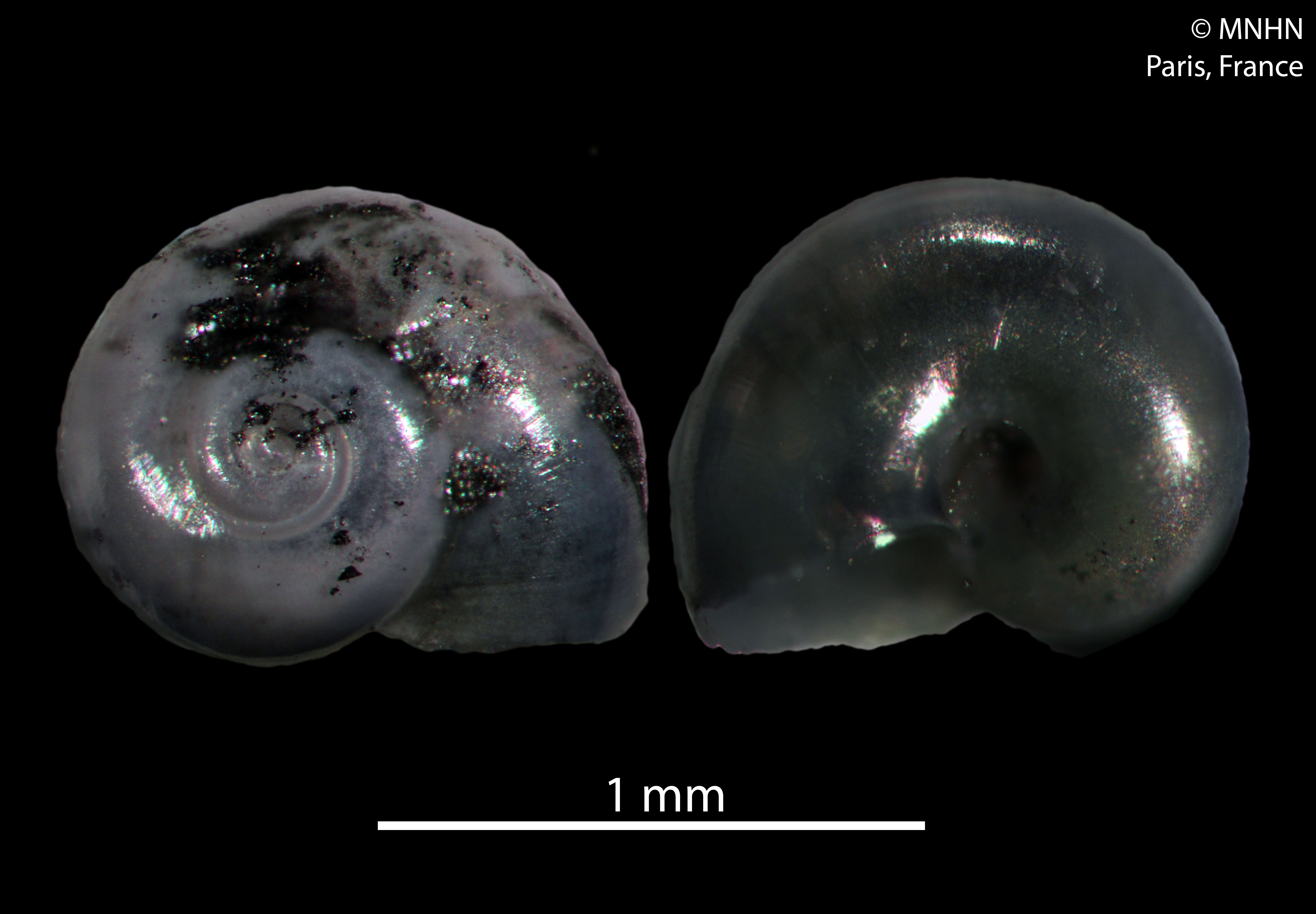
- Shell of Cornirostra lenticulata (paratype at MNHN, Paris)

Scientific classification
- Kingdom: Animalia
- Phylum: Mollusca
- Class: Gastropoda
- Subclass: Heterobranchia
- Infraclass: "Lower Heterobranchia"
- Superfamily: Valvatoidea
- Family: Cornirostridae; Ponder, 1990

= Cornirostridae =

Family of gastropods

The Cornirostridae is a taxonomic family of sea snails, marine gastropod mollusks in the informal group Lower Heterobranchia.

== Genera ==
- † Anomalorbina Paul, 1996
- † Bonnetella Cossmann, 1918
- Cornirostra Ponder, 1990
- † Heteronatica Guzhov, 2019
- Noerrevangia Warén & Schander, 1993
- Tomura Pilsbry & McGinty, 1946

Genus brought into synonymy

- † Anomalorbis Paul, 1991 synonym of † Anomalorbina Paul, 1996 (invalid: junior homonym of Anomalorbis Vine, 1972 (Annelida); see Anomalorbina)
- † Bonnetia Cossmann, 1907: synonym of † Bonnetella Cossmann, 1918 (junior homonym of Bonnetia Robineau-Desvoidy, 1830 [Diptera])
