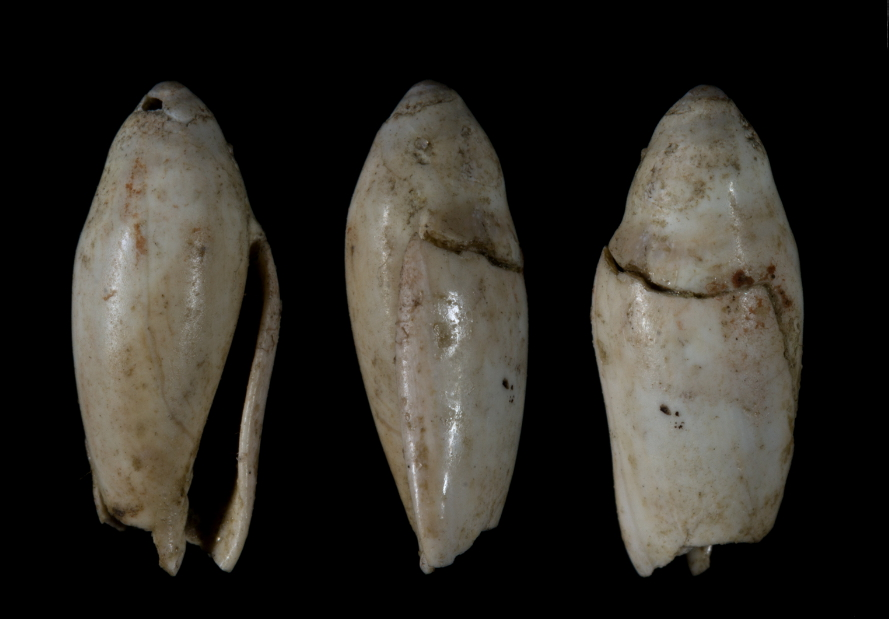
- Shell of Volvarina oblongata (specimen at MNHN, Paris)

Scientific classification
- Kingdom: Animalia
- Phylum: Mollusca
- Class: Gastropoda
- Subclass: Caenogastropoda
- Order: Neogastropoda
- Family: Marginellidae
- Subfamily: Marginellinae
- Genus: Volvarina
- Species: †V. oblongata

Binomial name
- †Volvarina oblongata (Sacco, 1890)

Synonyms
- † Hyalina (Volvarina) oblongata Glibert, 1960; † Marginella (Volvarina) oblongata Sacco, 1890 (basionym); † Marginella oblongata Sacco, 1890

= Volvarina oblongata =

Species of gastropod

Volvarina oblongata is an extinct species of sea snail, a marine gastropod mollusk in the family Marginellidae, the margin snails.

== Description ==
The length of the shell attains 11 mm, its diameter 4 mm.

== Distribution ==
Fossils of this marine species were found in Miocene strata in Piedmont, Italy.
