= Gordenellidae =

Scientific classification
- Kingdom: Animalia
- Phylum: Mollusca
- Class: Gastropoda
- Superfamily: Mathildoidea
- Family: †Gordenellidae; Gründel, 2000

Extinct family of gastropods

Gordenellidae is an extinct taxonomic family of sea snails, marine gastropod mollusks in the informal group Lower Heterobranchia.

== Genera ==
Genera within the family Gordenellidae include:

- Gordenella, the type genus
- Turritelloidea
