= Orbitestella parva =

Scientific classification
- Kingdom: Animalia
- Phylum: Mollusca
- Class: Gastropoda
- Family: Orbitestellidae
- Genus: Orbitestella
- Species: O. parva

Binomial name
- Orbitestella parva Finlay, 1924

Synonyms
- Zalipais parva (Finlay, 1924); Orbitestella vera (Powell, 1940)

Species of gastropod

Orbitestella parva is a species of small sea snail, a marine gastropod mollusc in the family Orbitestellidae.

== Description ==
The vitreous-white, very minute shell has a discoidal shape and a flat spire. The shell is smooth and perforate with some growth lines. The protoconch consists of one whorl, rather large and with a bulbous shape.

== Distribution ==
This marine species is endemic to New Zealand.
