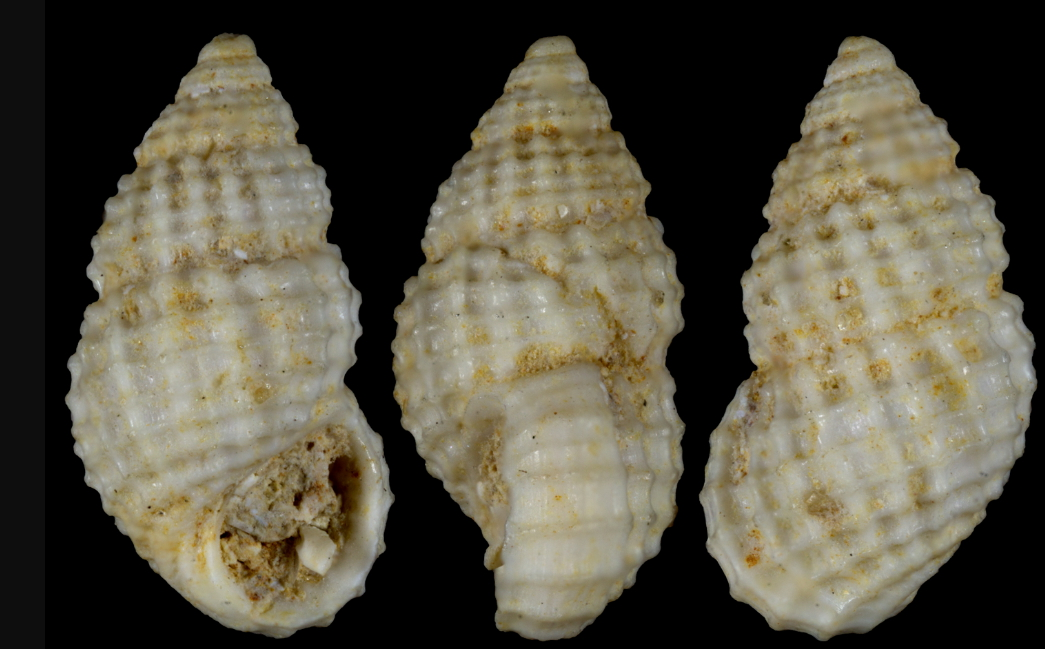
- Shell of Alvania transiens (syntype at MNHN, Paris)

Scientific classification
- Kingdom: Animalia
- Phylum: Mollusca
- Class: Gastropoda
- Subclass: Caenogastropoda
- Order: Littorinimorpha
- Superfamily: Rissooidea
- Family: Rissoidae
- Genus: Alvania
- Species: †A. transiens

Binomial name
- †Alvania transiens Sacco, 1895

Synonyms
- † Alvania (Acinopsis) sculpta var. transiens Sacco, 1895; † Alvania danubiensis Cossmann & Peyrot, 1919 (junior synonym)

= Alvania transiens =

Species of gastropod

Alvania transiens is an extinct species of minute sea snail, a marine gastropod mollusc or micromollusk in the family Rissoidae.

== Status ==
From its original source (Sacco, 1895: 27) this is a nomen nudum, however, it has been treated as a valid species.

== Distribution ==
Fossils of this species were found in Miocene strata in Austria.
