= Provalvatidae =

Scientific classification
- Kingdom: Animalia
- Phylum: Mollusca
- Class: Gastropoda
- Superfamily: Valvatoidea
- Family: †Provalvatidae; Bandel, 1991

Extinct family of gastropods

The Provalvatidae is an extinct taxonomic family of aquatic snails, gastropod molluscs in the informal group Lower Heterobranchia.
