= Glacidorbis occidentalis =

Conservation status
- Vulnerable (IUCN 2.3)

Scientific classification
- Kingdom: Animalia
- Phylum: Mollusca
- Class: Gastropoda
- Family: Glacidorbidae
- Genus: Glacidorbis
- Species: G. occidentalis

Binomial name
- Glacidorbis occidentalis Bunn & Stoddart, 1983

Species of gastropod

Glacidorbis occidentalis is a species of minute freshwater snails with an operculum, aquatic gastropod molluscs or micromolluscs in the family Glacidorbidae. This species is endemic to Australia.

This species was previously placed within the Hydrobiidae.

Size: Up to 1.2 mm in maximum diameter

Biology and ecology: Found in small intermittent streams, in gravel riffle sections. Presumably feeds on small injured animals, such as insect larvae and other molluscs.
