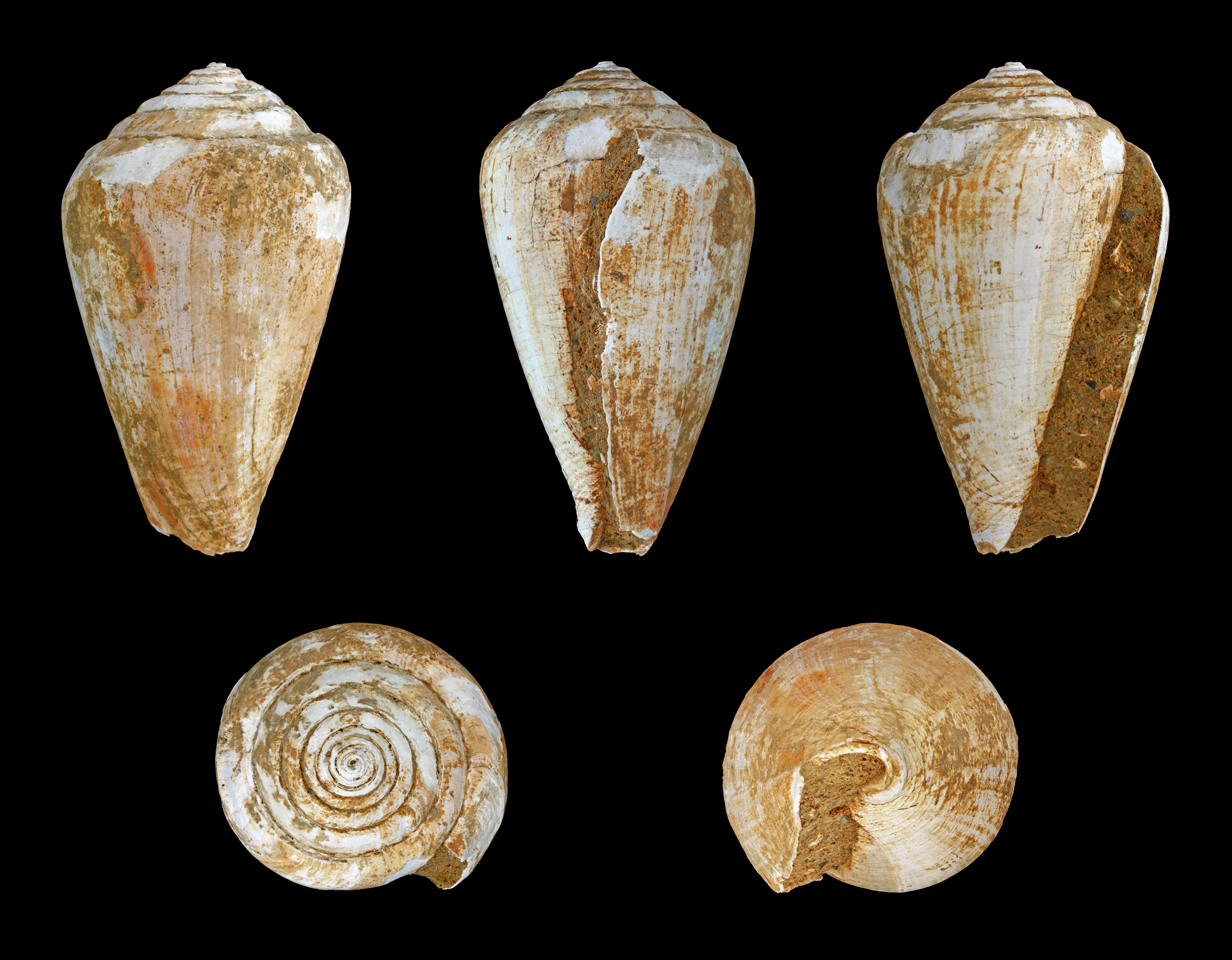
- Five views of a shell of Conus globoponderosus

Scientific classification
- Kingdom: Animalia
- Phylum: Mollusca
- Class: Gastropoda
- Subclass: Caenogastropoda
- Order: Neogastropoda
- Superfamily: Conoidea
- Family: Conidae
- Genus: Conus
- Species: C. globoponderosus

Binomial name
- Conus globoponderosus (Sacco, 1893)

Synonyms
- † Conus (Chelyconus) globoponderosus Sacco, 1893

= Conus globoponderosus =

Conus globoponderosus Temporal range: Late Miocene-Pliocene

Species of sea snail

Conus globoponderosus is a fossil species of sea snail, a marine gastropod mollusk in the family Conidae, the cone snails, cone shells or cones.

== Distribution ==
This marine species of cone snail is found only in the fossil state in the Miocene and Tertiary of Austria and Italy, Europe.
