= Cassianaxidae =

Scientific classification
- Kingdom: Animalia
- Phylum: Mollusca
- Class: Gastropoda
- Superfamily: Architectonicoidea
- Family: †Cassianaxidae; Bandel, 1996

Extinct family of gastropods

The Cassianaxidae is an extinct taxonomic family of sea snails, marine gastropod mollusks in the informal group Lower Heterobranchia.

This family has no subfamilies.
