= Ampezzanildidae =

Scientific classification
- Kingdom: Animalia
- Phylum: Mollusca
- Class: Gastropoda
- Superfamily: Mathildoidea
- Family: †Ampezzanildidae; Bandel, 1994

Extinct family of gastropods

Ampezzanildidae is an extinct family of sea snails, marine gastropod molluscs in the informal group Lower Heterobranchia.
