= Hyalogyrinidae =

Scientific classification
- Kingdom: Animalia
- Phylum: Mollusca
- Class: Gastropoda
- Subclass: Heterobranchia
- Infraclass: "Lower Heterobranchia"
- Superfamily: Valvatoidea
- Family: Hyalogyrinidae; Warén & Bouchet, 1993

Family of gastropods

The Hyalogyrinidae is a taxonomic family of sea snails, marine gastropod mollusks in the informal group Lower Heterobranchia.

== Genera ==
Genera within the family Hyalogyrinidae include:

- † Bandellina Schröder, 1995
- † Carboninia Bandel, 1996
- † Doggerostra Gründel, 1998
- Hyalogyra Marshall, 1988
- Hyalogyrina Marshall, 1988
- Xenoskenea Waren & Gofas in Waren Gofas & Schander, 1993

Synonym

- † Alexogyra Bandel, 1996: synonym of † Bandellina Schröder, 1995
