= Granosolarium =

Scientific classification
- Kingdom: Animalia
- Phylum: Mollusca
- Class: Gastropoda
- Family: Architectonicidae
- Genus: Granosolarium; Sacco, 1892

Type species
- † Solarium millegranum Lamarck, 1822

Synonyms
- Architectonica (Granosolarium) Sacco, 1892 superseded rank; Architectonica (Solariaxis) Dall, 1892 junior subjective synonym; Claraxis Iredale, 1936; Heliacus (Claraxis) Iredale, 1936; Solariaxis Dall, 1892; Solarium (Granosolarium) Sacco, 1892 superseded rank; Solarium (Granulosolarium) [sic] misspelling - incorrect subsequent spelling; Solarium (Solariaxis) Dall, 1892 junior subjective synonym

Genus of gastropods

Granosolarium is a genus of snail. It was named by Federico Sacco in 1892.

== Species ==
- Granosolarium asperum (Hinds, 1844)
- Granosolarium boholense Poppe & Tagaro, 2026 (original description)
- † Granosolarium canaliculatum (Lamarck, 1804)
- † Granosolarium coffea Sohl, 1964
- † Granosolarium crenulare (Deshayes, 1863)
- † Granosolarium cretasteum Stilwell & R. A. Henderson, 2002
- Granosolarium elegantissimum (Kuroda & Habe in Habe, 1961)
- Granosolarium excavatum Bieler, 1993
- Granosolarium gemmiferum Bieler, 1993
- † Granosolarium marwicki (R. S. Allan, 1926)
- † Granosolarium millegranum (Lamarck, 1822)
- Granosolarium mirabile (Schepman, 1909)
- † Granosolarium nomurai (MacNeil, 1961)
- † Granosolarium semilaeve (Sacco, 1892)
- † Granosolarium solitarium Lozouet, 1999
- † Granosolarium subgranulatum (A. d'Orbigny, 1850)
