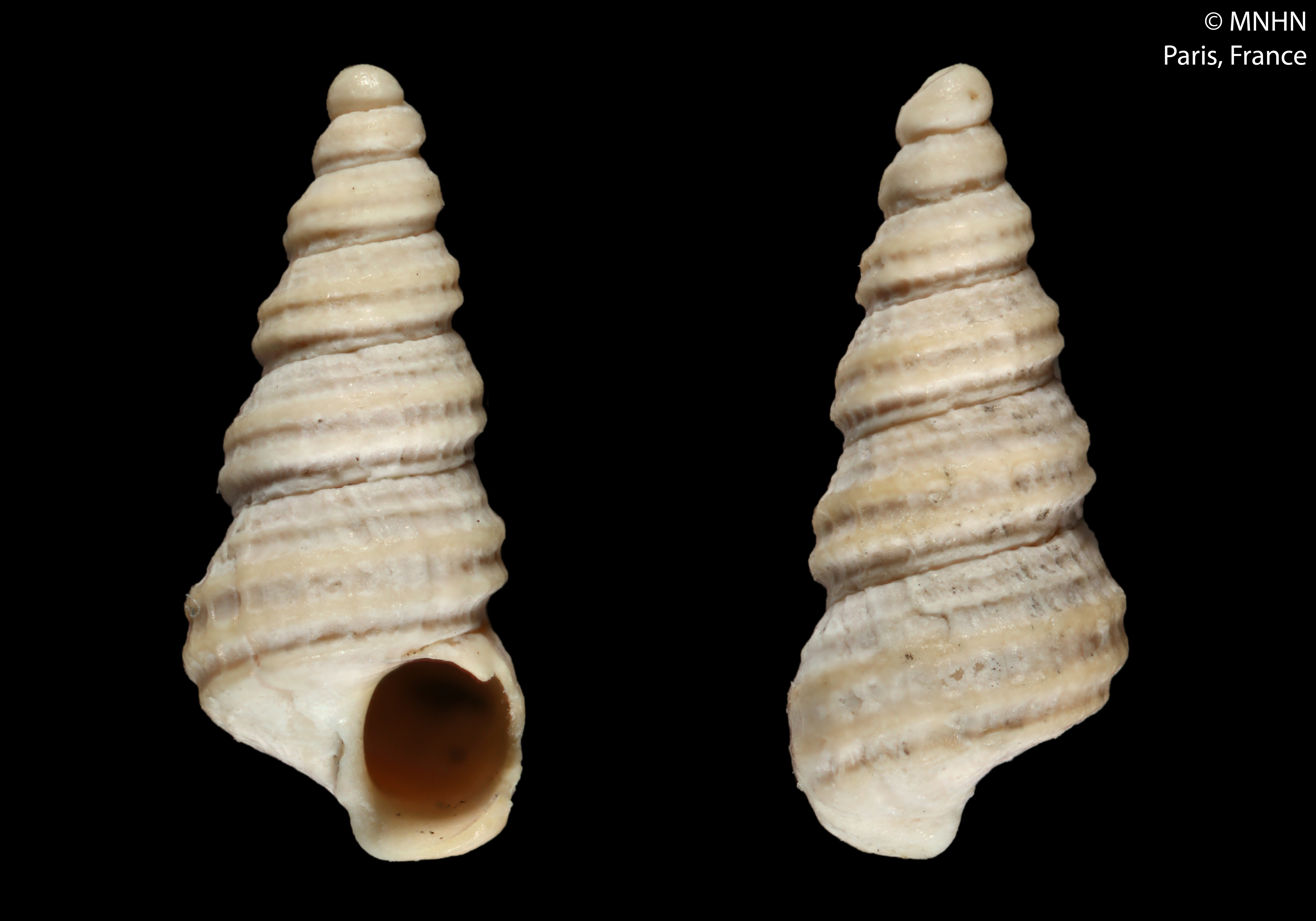
- Shell of Mathilda magellanica (syntype at MNHN, Paris)

Scientific classification
- Kingdom: Animalia
- Phylum: Mollusca
- Class: Gastropoda
- Infraclass: "Lower Heterobranchia"
- Superfamily: Mathildoidea
- Family: Mathildidae
- Genus: Mathilda; Semper, 1865

Type species
- Turbo quadricarinatus Brocchi, 1814

Synonyms
- Eucharilda Iredale, 1929; Fimbriatella Sacco, 1895; Granulicharilda Kuroda & Habe in Kuroda, Habe & Oyama, 1971; † Mathilda (Tricarilda) Gründel, 1973 accepted, alternate representation; Mathildona Iredale, 1929; Opimilda Iredale, 1929

= Mathilda (gastropod) =

Mathilda Temporal range: Late Triassic–Present

Genus of gastropods

Mathilda is a genus of sea snails, marine gastropod mollusks in the family Mathildidae.

== Species ==
- Mathilda amaea Dall, 1927
- Mathilda amanda Thiele, 1925
- Mathilda argentina Castellanos, 1990
- Mathilda barbadensis Dall, 1889
- Mathilda bieleri Smriglio & Mariottini, 2007
- Mathilda boucheti Bieler, 1995
- Mathilda brevicula Bavay, 1922
- Mathilda brownae Smriglio, Mariottini & Swinnen, 2017
- Mathilda cancellata Kuroda, 1958
- Mathilda carystia Melvill & Standen, 1903
- Mathilda cerea Kuroda, 1958
- Mathilda cochlaeformis Brugnone, 1873
- Mathilda coronata Monterosato, 1875
- Mathilda cryptostoma de Folin, 1874
- Mathilda decorata Hedley, 1903
- Mathilda epicharis de Folin, 1870
- Mathilda fusca (Okutani & Habe, 1981)
- Mathilda gemmulata Semper, 1865
- Mathilda gemmulifera Kuroda, 1958
- Mathilda georgiana Dall, 1927
- Mathilda globulifera Dall, 1927
- Mathilda granifera Dall, 1927
- Mathilda hendersoni Dall, 1927
- Mathilda herberti Mariottini, Smriglio & di Giulio, 2009
- Mathilda houbricki Bieler, 1995
- Mathilda lacteosa Dall, 1927
- Mathilda letei Prki & Smriglio, 2007
- Mathilda maculosa Bieler, 1995
- Mathilda magellanica P. Fischer, 1873
- Mathilda malvinarum (Melvill & Standen, 1907)
- Mathilda maoria (Powell, 1940)
- Mathilda mozambicensis Mariottini, Smriglio & di Giulio, 2009
- Mathilda quadricarinata (Brocchi, 1814)
- Mathilda quinquelirata Kuroda, 1958
- Mathilda retusa Brugnone, 1873
- Mathilda rhigomaches Melvill & Standen, 1912
- Mathilda richeri Bieler, 1995
- Mathilda rushii Dall, 1889
- Mathilda sagamiensis (Kuroda & Habe in Kuroda, Habe & Oyama, 1971)
- Mathilda salve Barnard, 1963
- Mathilda sansibarica Thiele, 1925
- Mathilda scalaris (Kuroda & Habe in Kuroda, Habe & Oyama, 1971)
- Mathilda scitula Dall, 1889
- Mathilda sinensis P. Fischer, 1867
- Mathilda trochlea Mörch, 1875
- Mathilda vanaartseni De Jong & Coomans, 1988
- Mathilda yucatecana (Dall, 1881)
- Mathilda zmitampis Melvill & Standen, 1901

Species brought into synonymy

- Mathilda canariensis Dautzenberg, 1890: synonym of Mathilda gemmulata Semper, 1865 (synonym)
- Mathilda elegans de Folin, 1870: synonym of Liamorpha elegans (de Folin, 1870) (original combination)
- Mathilda eurytima Melvill & Standen, 1896: synonym of Cerithium nodulosum Bruguière, 1792
- Mathilda granolirata Brugnone, 1873: synonym of Mathilda cochlaeformis Brugnone, 1873 (synonym)
- Mathilda haasi Mienis, 1978: synonym of Mathilda gemmulata Semper, 1865 (synonym)
- Mathilda jeffreysi Dall, 1889: synonym of Tuba jeffreysi (Dall, 1889)
- Mathilda neozelanica Suter, 1908: synonym of Brookesena neozelanica (Suter, 1908)
- Mathilda rosae Hedley, 1901: synonym of Charilda rosae (Hedley, 1901)
- Mathilda telamonia Melvill, 1912: synonym of Mathilda sinensis P. Fischer, 1867
