= Amphitomariidae =

Scientific classification
- Kingdom: Animalia
- Phylum: Mollusca
- Class: Gastropoda
- Superfamily: Architectonicoidea
- Family: †Amphitomariidae; Bandel, 1994

Extinct family of gastropods

The Amphitomariidae is an extinct taxonomic family of sea snails, marine gastropod mollusks in the informal group Lower Heterobranchia.

This family has no subfamilies.
