= Brookesena =

Scientific classification
- Kingdom: Animalia
- Phylum: Mollusca
- Class: Gastropoda
- Family: Mathildidae
- Genus: Brookesena; Finlay, 1926

Type species
- Mathilda neozelanica Suter, 1908

Species
- See text

Genus of gastropods

Brookesena is a genus of sea snails, marine gastropod mollusks in the family Mathildidae,

== Species ==
- Brookesena neozelanica (Suter, 1908)
- Brookesena succincta (Suter, 1908)
- Brookesena turrita (Warén, 1996)
