= Benthodorbis =

Scientific classification
- Kingdom: Animalia
- Phylum: Mollusca
- Class: Gastropoda
- Family: Glacidorbidae
- Genus: Benthodorbis; Ponder & Avern, 2000

Genus of gastropods

Benthodorbis is a genus of minute freshwater snails with an operculum and a gill, aquatic gastropod molluscs or micromolluscs in the family Glacidorbidae.

== Species ==
Species within the genus Benthodorbis include:

- Bethodorbis fultoni
- Benthodorbis pawpela
