= Striadorbis pedderi =

Glacidorbis pedderi

Conservation status
- Data Deficient (IUCN 2.3)

Scientific classification
- Kingdom: Animalia
- Phylum: Mollusca
- Class: Gastropoda
- Family: Glacidorbidae
- Genus: Striadorbis
- Species: S. pedderi

Binomial name
- Striadorbis pedderi (Smith, 1973)

Synonyms
- Glacidorbis pedderi Smith, 1973

Species of gastropod

Striadorbis pedderi is a species of small freshwater snail with an operculum, aquatic gastropod mollusc or micromollusc in the family Glacidorbidae. This species is endemic to Australia.

This species was previously placed in the Hydrobiidae.
