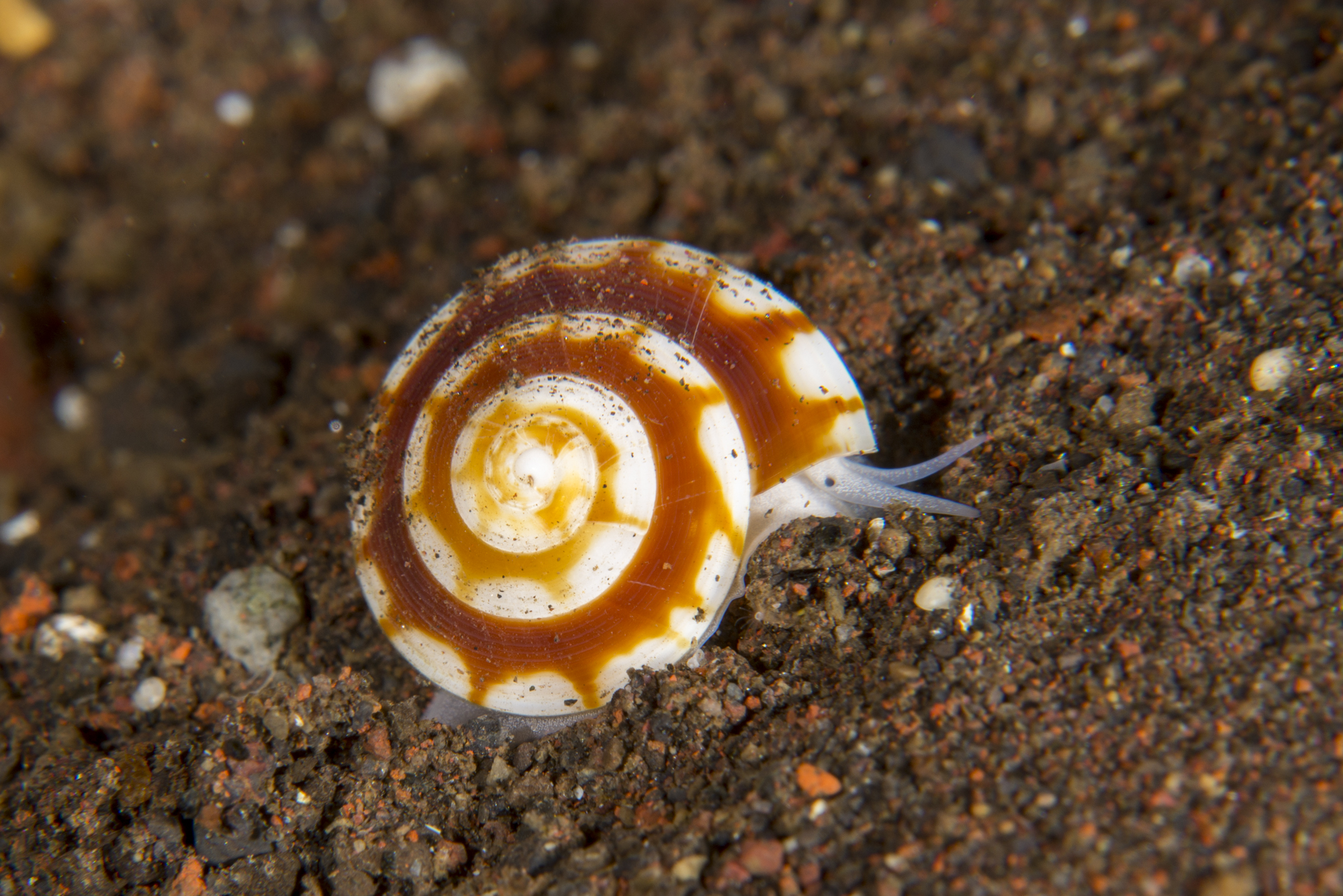
- Tulamben, Bali, Indonesia
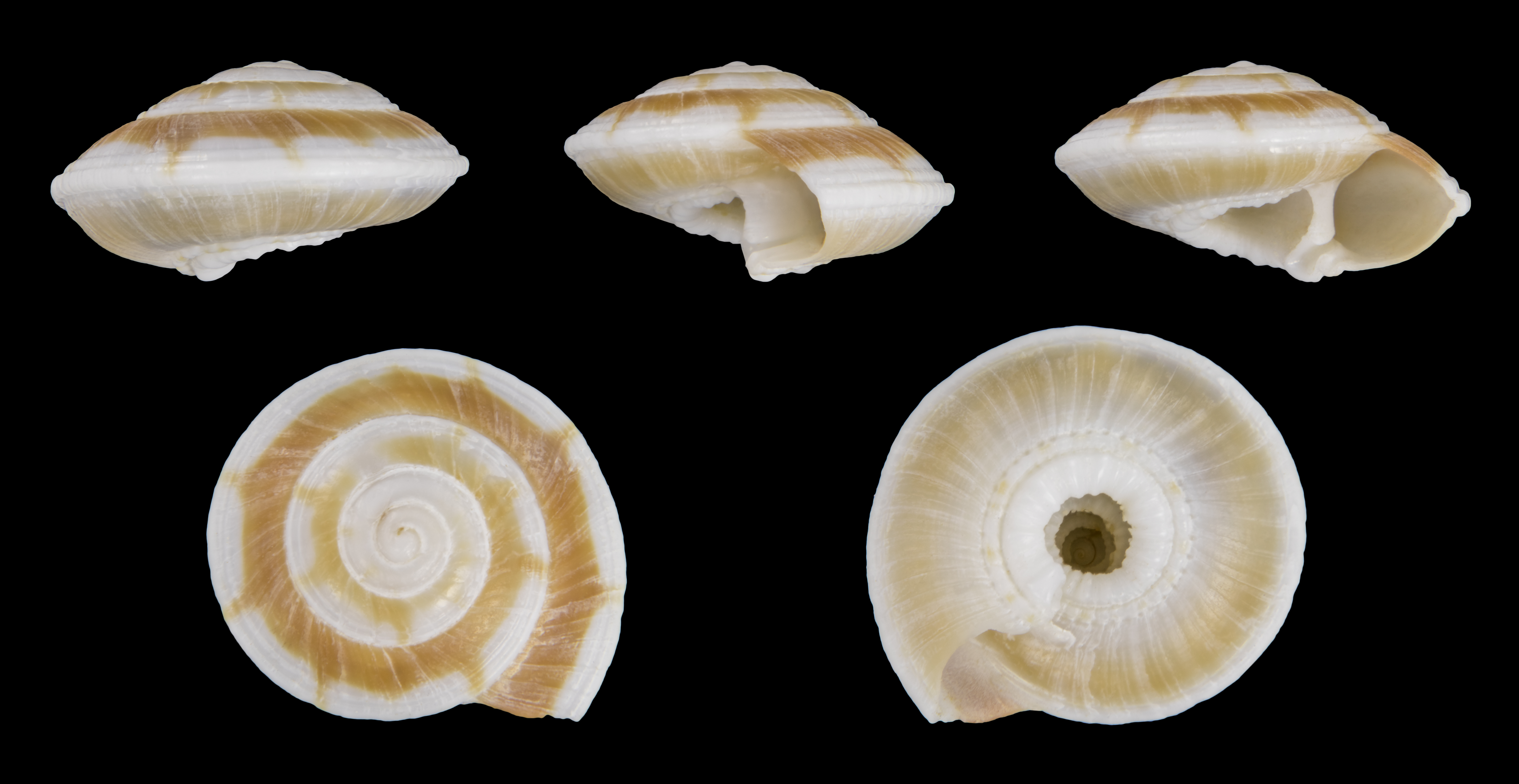

Scientific classification
- Kingdom: Animalia
- Phylum: Mollusca
- Class: Gastropoda
- Family: Architectonicidae
- Genus: Psilaxis
- Species: P. radiatus

Binomial name
- Psilaxis radiatus (Röding, 1798)

Synonyms
- Architectonica radiata Röding, 1798; Philippia layardi A. Adams, 1855; Philippia radiata (Röding, 1798); Philippia stipator Iredale, 1931; Solarium (Philippia) cingulum (Kiener, 1839); Solarium (Philippia) cingulum var. subconcolor Martens, 1880; Solarium (Philippia) hybridum var. australis Hanley, 1863; Solarium (Philippia) hybridum var. undatum Hanley, 1863; Solarium cingulum Kiener, 1839; Solarium kowiensis W. H. Turton, 1932

= Psilaxis radiatus =

Species of gastropod

Psilaxis radiatus is a species of sea snail, a marine gastropod mollusc in the family Architectonicidae, which are known as the staircase shells or sundials.

== Description ==
Psilaxis radiatus has a shell that reaches 26 mm.

== Distribution ==
This species can be found in the Indo-Pacific, from the Red Sea and South Africa via Japan, Indonesia, the Philippines and eastern Australia to Hawaii.
