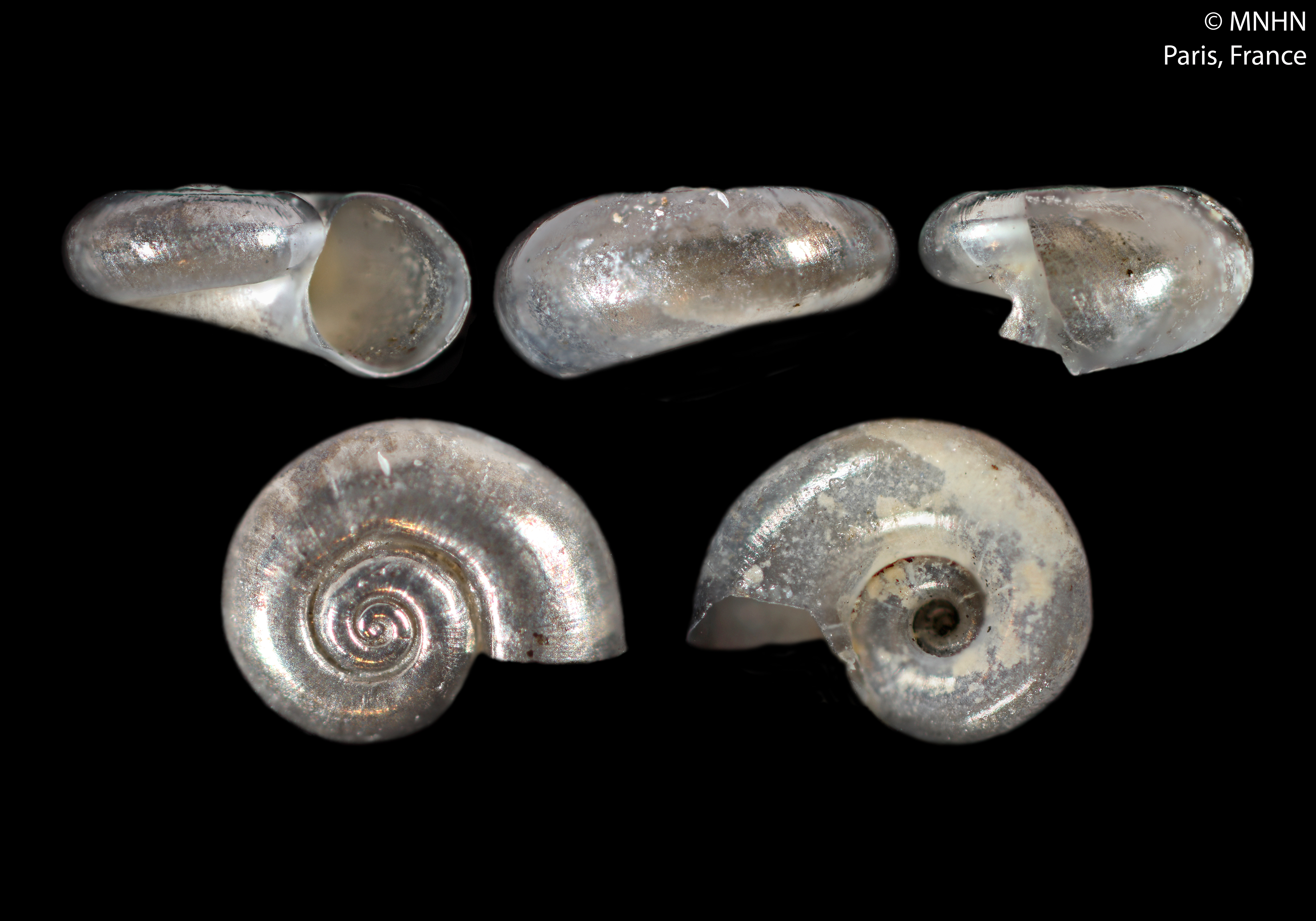
- Xylodiscula boucheti

Scientific classification
- Kingdom: Animalia
- Phylum: Mollusca
- Class: Gastropoda
- Subclass: Heterobranchia
- Infraclass: "Lower Heterobranchia"
- Superfamily: Orbitestelloidea
- Family: Xylodisculidae; Warén, 1992

Genera
- Xylodiscula

= Xylodisculidae =

Family of gastropods

The Xylodisculidae is a taxonomic family of sea snails, marine gastropod mollusks in the informal group Lower Heterobranchia.

== Genera ==
- Xylodiscula B. A. Marshall, 1988
