= Trachoecidae =

Scientific classification
- Kingdom: Animalia
- Phylum: Mollusca
- Class: Gastropoda
- Superfamily: Mathildoidea
- Family: †Trachoecidae; Bandel, 1994

Extinct family of gastropods

The Trachoecidae is an extinct taxonomic family of fossil sea snails, marine gastropod molluscs in the superfamily Mathildoidea.
