= Microcarina crenulata =

Scientific classification
- Kingdom: Animalia
- Phylum: Mollusca
- Class: Gastropoda
- Subclass: Vetigastropoda
- Family: incertae sedis
- Genus: Microcarina
- Species: M. crenulata

Binomial name
- Microcarina crenulata (Powell, 1937)

Species of gastropod

Microcarina crenulata is a species of sea snail, a marine gastropod mollusk, unassigned in the superfamily Seguenzioidea.
