= Benthodorbis pawpela =

Glacidorbis pawpela

Conservation status
- Data Deficient (IUCN 3.1)

Scientific classification
- Kingdom: Animalia
- Phylum: Mollusca
- Class: Gastropoda
- Family: Glacidorbidae
- Genus: Benthodorbis
- Species: B. pawpela

Binomial name
- Benthodorbis pawpela (Smith, 1979)

Synonyms
- Glacidorbis pawpela Smith, 1979

Species of gastropod

Benthodorbis pawpela is a species of small freshwater snail with an operculum, aquatic gastropod mollusc or micromollusc in the family Glacidorbidae. This species is endemic to Australia.

This species was previously placed in the Hydrobiidae.
