= Microcarina surgerea =

Scientific classification
- Kingdom: Animalia
- Phylum: Mollusca
- Class: Gastropoda
- Subclass: Vetigastropoda
- Superfamily: Seguenzioidea
- Family: incertae sedis
- Genus: Microcarina
- Species: M. surgerea

Binomial name
- Microcarina surgerea Laseron, 1954

Species of gastropod

Microcarina surgerea is a species of sea snail, unassigned within the superfamily Seguenzioidea, the turban snails.

== Description ==
The shell grows to a length of 1 mm.

== Distribution ==
This marine species occurs off Australia, from New South Wales to Victoria.
