= Striadorbis =

Scientific classification
- Kingdom: Animalia
- Phylum: Mollusca
- Class: Gastropoda
- Family: Glacidorbidae
- Genus: Striadorbis; Ponder & Avern, 2000

Genus of gastropods

Striadorbis is a genus of minute freshwater snails that have an operculum, aquatic gastropod molluscs or micromolluscs in the family Glacidorbidae.

== Species ==
Species within the genus Striadorbis include:

- Striadorbis janetae
- Striadorbis pedderi
- Striadorbis spiralis

== Distribution ==
Species in this genus are found in Tasmania and western Victoria, as per Ponder & Avern, 2000.
