= Microcarina =

Scientific classification
- Kingdom: Animalia
- Phylum: Mollusca
- Class: Gastropoda
- Subclass: Vetigastropoda
- Family: incertae sedis
- Genus: Microcarina; Laseron, 1954

Genus of gastropods

Microcarina is a genus of sea snails, marine gastropod mollusks, unassigned in the superfamily Seguenzioidea.

== Species ==
Species within the genus Microcarina include:

- Microcarina crenulata (Powell, 1937)
- Microcarina mayii (Tate, 1899)
- Microcarina surgerea Laseron, 1954
