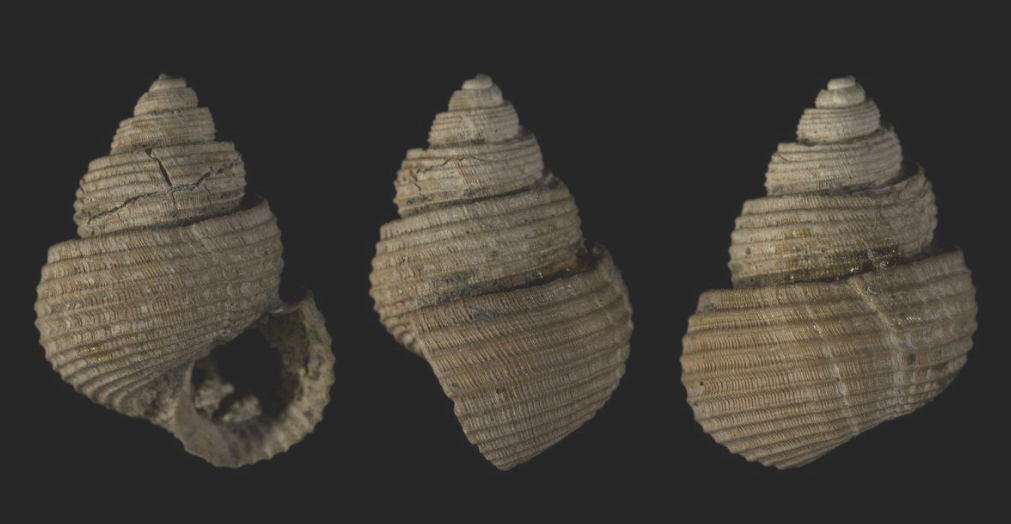
- Shell of † Tuba sulcata 001.jpg (specimen at MNHN, Paris)

Scientific classification
- Kingdom: Animalia
- Phylum: Mollusca
- Class: Gastropoda
- Subclass: Heterobranchia
- Infraclass: "Lower Heterobranchia"
- Superfamily: Mathildoidea
- Family: Mathildidae; Dall, 1889

Synonyms
- Tubidae Finlay & Marwick, 1937; Turritellopsinae Marwick, 1957

= Mathildidae =

Family of gastropods

Mathildidae is a family of small sea snails, marine gastropod molluscs in the superfamily Mathildoidea of the informal group of the Lower Heterobranchia.

== General characteristics ==
(Original description) These shells recall Bittium and Turritella. They feature a blunt apex upon which a small, heterostrophic, Adeorbis-shaped protoconch is set on its edge, often tilting to one side of the axis. The operculum is reported to be multispiral and externally concave, while the soft parts of the animal are externally quite similar to those of Turritella.The dentition of the group, however, remains unknown..

== Distribution ==
This group is abundantly represented in the Eocene Tertiary of the Paris Basin. A few recent species are widely distributed, including two or three that inhabit the Mediterranean.

== Genera ==
Genera within the family Mathildidae include:

- † Acrocoelum Cossmann, 1888
- † Angulathilda Gründel & Nützel, 2013
- † Bandelthilda Gründel, 1997
- † Bathraspira Cossmann, 1906
- Brookesena Finlay, 1926
- † Carinathilda Gründel, 1997
- † Echinimathilda Sohl, 1961
- † Eomathilda H. J. Finlay & Marwick, 1937
- † Erratothilda Gründel, 1997
- Fimbriatella Sacco, 1895
- † Gymnothilda M. Schröder, 1995
- † Jurilda Gründel, 1973
- † Lemniscolittorina Sohl, 1961
- Mathilda Semper, 1865
- † Pseudalaria Hudleston, 1889
- † Pseudotuba Harzhauser & Landau, 2023
- † Tangarilda Gründel, 2010
- † Teretrina Cossmann, 1912
- † Toulminella Bieler & Dockery, 2007
- † Tricarilda Gründel, 1973
- Tuba Lea, 1833
- Turritellopsis G. O. Sars, 1878
- † Valsantia Ludbrook, 1957
- † Veterator Laws, 1944

Genera brought into synonymy

- Eucharilda Iredale, 1929: synonym of Mathilda Semper, 1865
- Fimbriatella Sacco, 1895: synonym of Mathilda Semper, 1865
- Gegania Jeffreys, 1884: synonym of Tuba Lea, 1833
- Granulicharilda Kuroda & Habe in Kuroda, Habe & Oyama, 1971: synonym of Mathilda Semper, 1865
- Mathildona Iredale, 1929: synonym of Mathilda Semper, 1865
- Opimilda Iredale, 1929: synonym of Mathilda Semper, 1865
