= Heterosubulitidae =

Scientific classification
- Kingdom: Animalia
- Phylum: Mollusca
- Class: Gastropoda
- Subclass: Caenogastropoda
- Order: incertae sedis
- Superfamily: †Soleniscoidea
- Family: †Heterosubulitidae; Bandel, 2002

Extinct family of gastropods

Heterosubulitidae is an extinct family of sea snails, marine gastropod molluscs in the subclass Caenogastropoda.
