= Dolomitellidae =

Scientific classification
- Kingdom: Animalia
- Phylum: Mollusca
- Class: Gastropoda
- Subclass: Heterobranchia
- Infraclass: incertae sedis
- Family: †Dolomitellidae; Bandel, 1994

Extinct family of gastropods

The Dolomitellidae is an extinct taxonomic family of fossil sea snails, marine gastropod molluscs in the clade Heterobranchia.
