= Kuskokwimiidae =

Scientific classification
- Kingdom: Animalia
- Phylum: Mollusca
- Class: Gastropoda
- Subclass: Heterobranchia
- Infraclass: incertae sedis
- Family: †Kuskokwimiidae; Frýda & Blodgett, 2001

Extinct family of gastropods

Kuskokwimiidae is an extinct family of fossil sea snails, marine gastropod molluscs in the clade Heterobranchia.
