= Misurinellidae =

Scientific classification
- Kingdom: Animalia
- Phylum: Mollusca
- Class: Gastropoda
- Subclass: Heterobranchia
- Infraclass: incertae sedis
- Genus: †Misurinellidae; Bandel, 1994

Extinct family of gastropods

The Misurinellidae is an extinct family of sea snails, marine gastropod molluscs in the clade Heterobranchia.

== Genera ==
Genera within the family Misureinellidae include:

- Misurinella Bandel, 1994, the type genus
