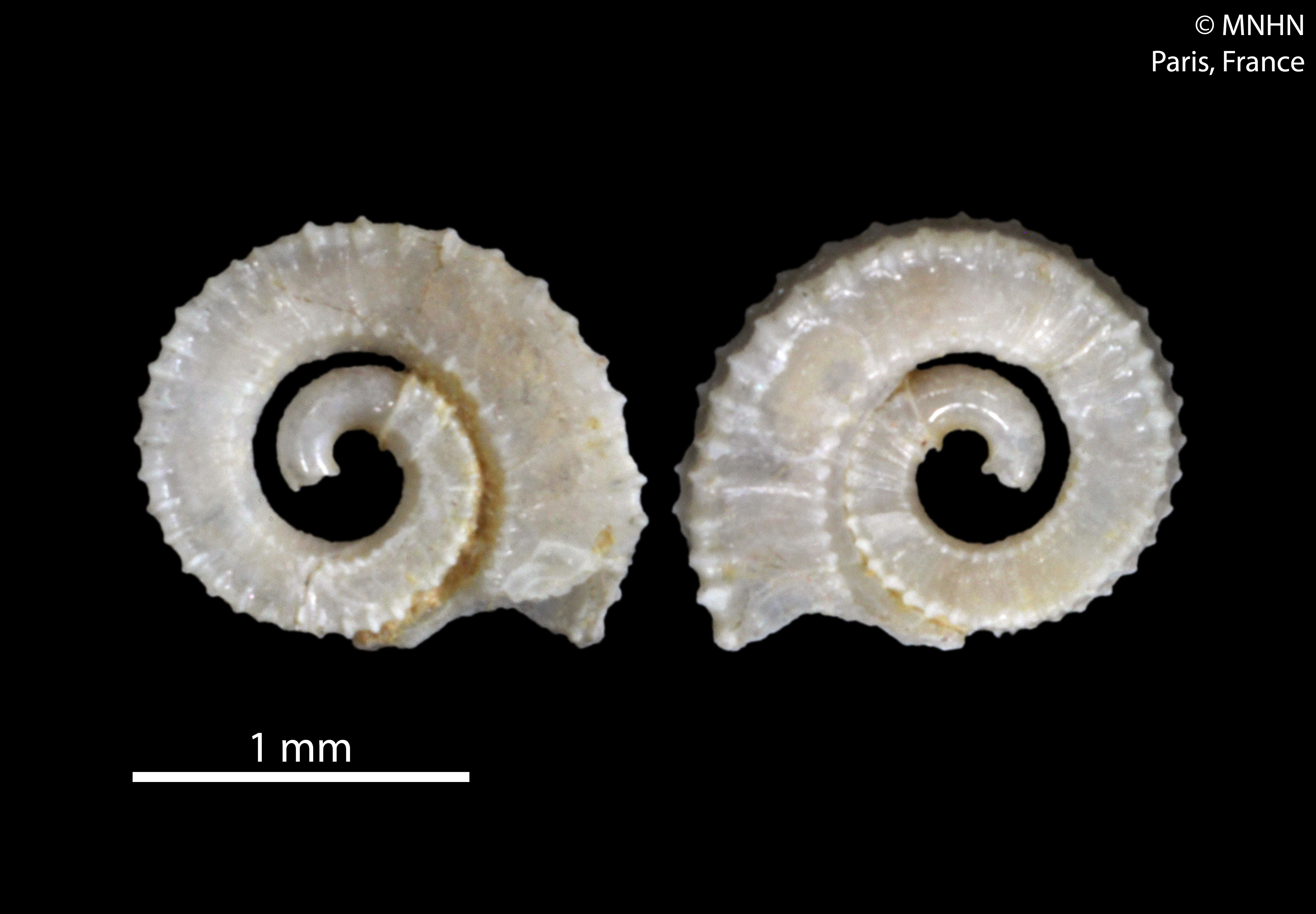
- shell Spirolaxis centrifuga

Scientific classification
- Domain: Eukaryota
- Kingdom: Animalia
- Phylum: Mollusca
- Class: Gastropoda
- Infraclass: Lower Heterobranchia
- Superfamily: Architectonicoidea; Gray, 1850

= Architectonicoidea =

Superfamily of gastropods

Architectonicoidea is a superfamily of sea snails, marine gastropod mollusks in the informal group Lower Heterobranchia.

This superfamily contains the extant family Architectonicidae and also contains the extinct families Amphitomariidae and Cassianaxidae.
