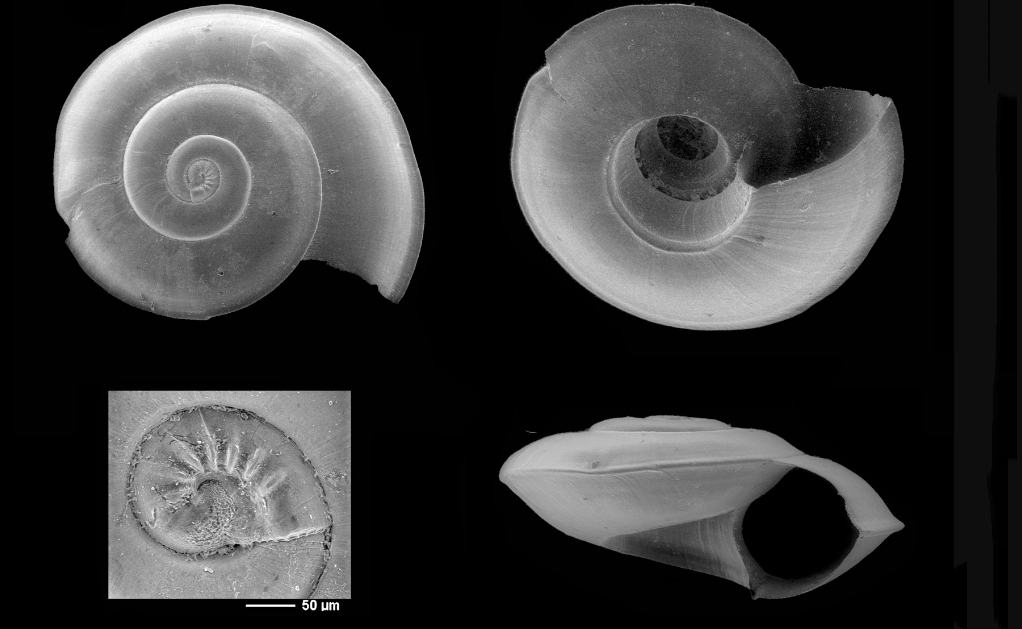
- Shell of Absonus primus (holotype at MNHN, Paris)

Scientific classification
- Kingdom: Animalia
- Phylum: Mollusca
- Class: Gastropoda
- Subclass: Heterobranchia
- Infraclass: "Lower Heterobranchia"
- Superfamily: Orbitestelloidea
- Family: Orbitestellidae; Iredale, 1917

Genera
- See text

Synonyms
- Microdisculidae Iredale & McMichael, 1962 (n.a.)

= Orbitestellidae =

Family of gastropods

Orbitestellidae are a family of minuscule sea snails, marine gastropod molluscs or micromolluscs in the infraclassis Lower Heterobranchia.

== Genera ==
Genera within the family Orbitestellidae include:

- Absonus Rubio & Rolán, 2021
- Boschitestella Moolenbeek, 1994
- † Kaiwarella Bandel, Gründel & P. A. Maxwell, 2000
- Lurifax Warén & Bouchet, 2001
- Microdiscula Thiele, 1912
- Orbitestella Iredale, 1917
- Patagorbitestella Di Luca, Griffin & Pastorino, 2023
