= Mathildoidea =

Scientific classification
- Domain: Eukaryota
- Kingdom: Animalia
- Phylum: Mollusca
- Class: Gastropoda
- Subclass: Heterobranchia
- Infraclass: Lower Heterobranchia
- Superfamily: Mathildoidea; Dall, 1889

Superfamily of gastropods

Mathildoidea is a superfamily of sea snails, marine gastropod mollusks in the informal group Lower Heterobranchia.

== Families ==
Families within the superfamily Mathildoidea include:

- Family Mathildidae
- † Family Ampezzanildidae
- † Family Anoptychiidae
- † Family Gordenellidae
- Family Tofanellidae
- † Family Trachoecidae
