= Orbitestelloidea =

Scientific classification
- Kingdom: Animalia
- Phylum: Mollusca
- Class: Gastropoda
- Subclass: Heterobranchia
- Infraclass: "Lower Heterobranchia"
- Superfamily: Orbitestelloidea; Iredale, 1917

Superfamily of gastropods

Orbitestelloidea are a superfamily of minute sea snails, marine gastropod molluscs or micromolluscs in the infraclass Lower Heterobranchia.

== Families ==
- Orbitestellidae Iredale, 1917
- Xylodisculidae Warén, 1992

Synonyms

- Microdisculidae Iredale & McMichael, 1962: synonym of Orbitestellidae Iredale, 1917 (unavailable name: no diagnosis)
