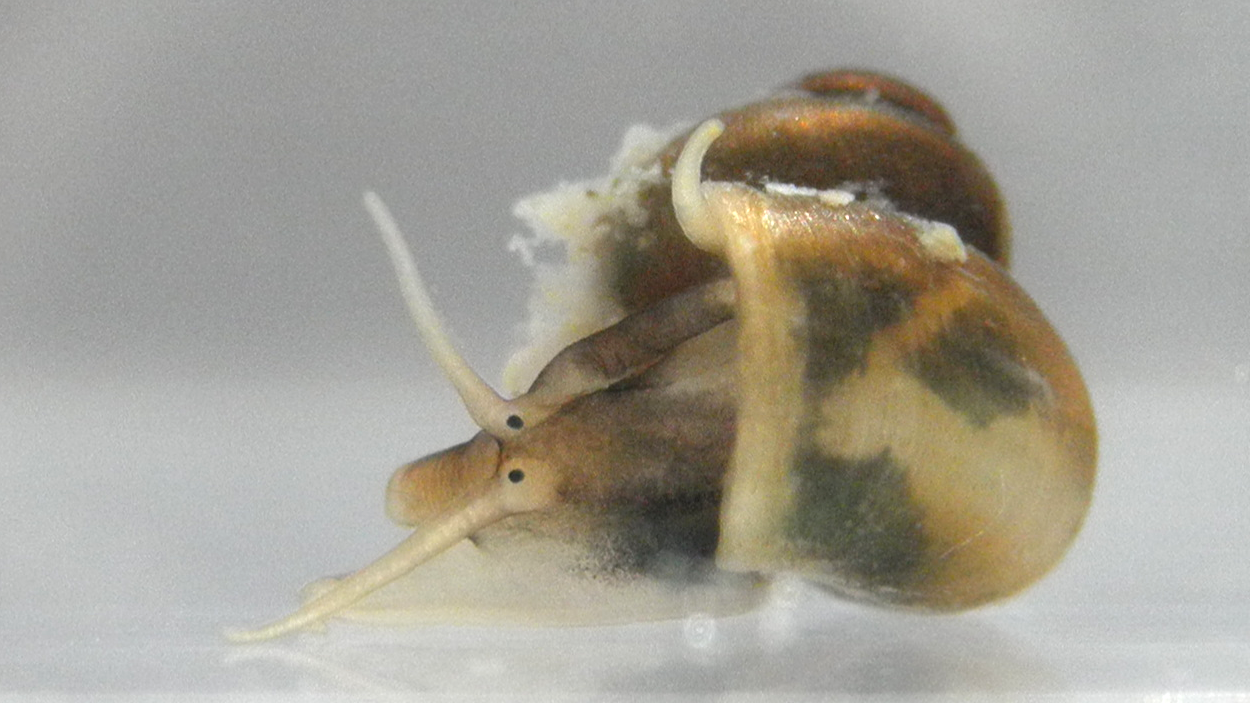
- a live Valvata piscinalis

Scientific classification
- Domain: Eukaryota
- Kingdom: Animalia
- Phylum: Mollusca
- Class: Gastropoda
- Subclass: Heterobranchia
- Infraclass: Lower Heterobranchia
- Superfamily: Valvatoidea; Gray, 1840

Families
- See text

= Valvatoidea =

Superfamily of gastropods

Valvatoidea is a superfamily of minute freshwater and marine snails, aquatic gastropod mollusks in the informal group Lower Heterobranchia.

== Taxonomy ==
- Family Valvatidae
- Family Cornirostridae
- Family Hyalogyrinidae
- † Family Provalvatidae
