= Glacidorbidae =

Scientific classification
- Kingdom: Animalia
- Phylum: Mollusca
- Class: Gastropoda
- Superfamily: Glacidorboidea; Ponder, 1986
- Family: Glacidorbidae; Ponder, 1986

Diversity
- 20 freshwater species

Family of gastropods

The Glacidorbidae is a taxonomic family of freshwater snails.

== Taxonomy ==
=== 2005 taxonomy ===
Glacidorbidae is the only family in the superfamily Glacidorboidea. Glacidorboidea has been classified within the informal group Lower Heterobranchia in the taxonomy of Bouchet & Rocroi (2005).

=== 2010 taxonomy ===
Jörger et al. (2010) redefined the major groups within the Heterobranchia; they moved Glacidorboidea to Panpulmonata.

== Genera ==
Genera within the family Glacidorbidae include:

- Glacidorbis Iredale, 1943 – the type genus
- Gondwanorbis Ponder, 1986
- Benthodorbis Ponder & Avern, 2000
- Striadorbis Ponder & Avern, 2000
- Tasmodorbis Ponder & Avern, 2000
