= Federico Sacco =

Italian geologist, paleontologist and mycologist

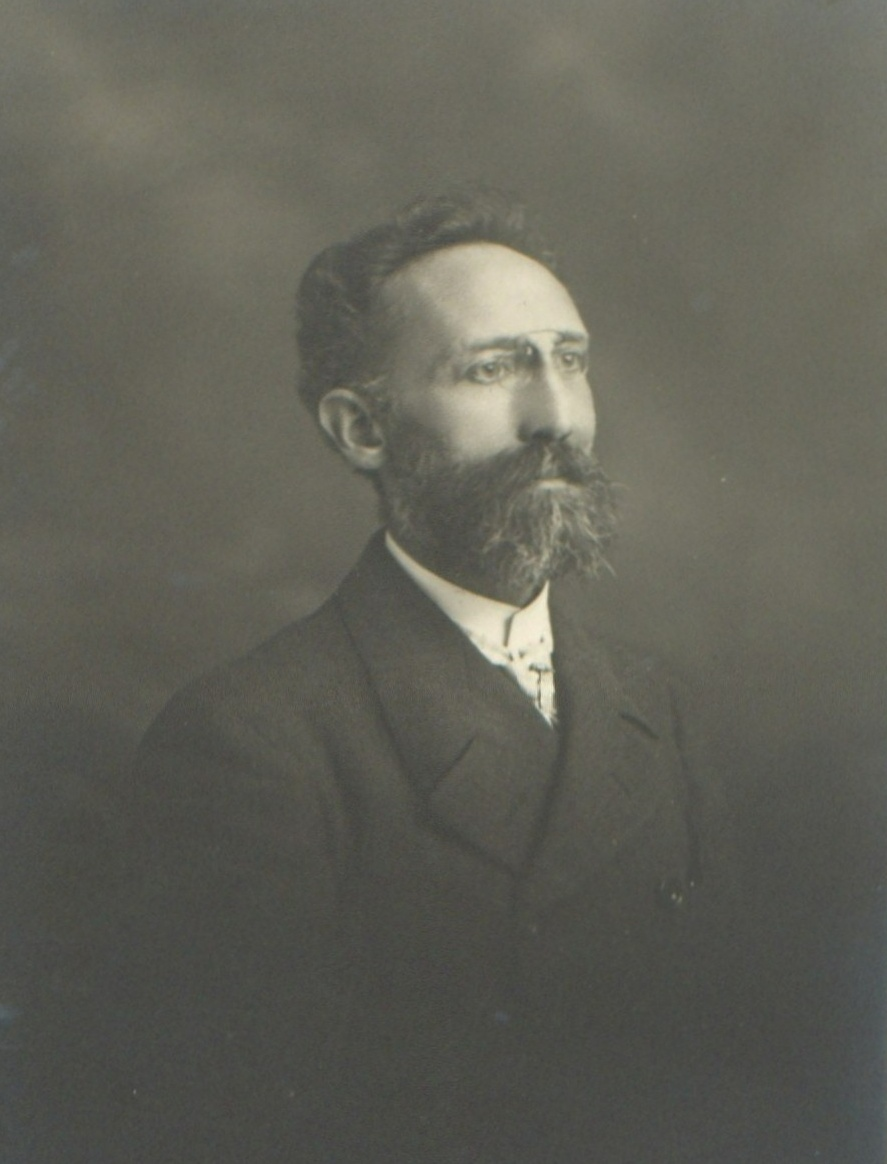
- Born: 5 February 1864; Fossano
- Died: 2 October 1948; Turin

Federico Sacco (5 February 1864, in Fossano – 2 October 1948, in Trofarello) was an Italian geologist, palaeontologist and mycologist.

== Biography ==
He was the son of Giuseppe Antonio, a doctor, and Faustina Maria Quaglia. After his secondary studies in Fossano, Federico Sacco graduated in 1884 in natural sciences at the University of Turin; he was a disciple of Martino Baretti, collaborator and friend of Quintino Sella and Luigi Bellardi, a renowned Piedmontese palaeontologist.

For over thirty years, from 1897 to 1935, he held the chair of geology at the Polytechnic University of Turin and, for over forty years, that of palaeontology at the University of Turin. He was a member of the Accademia dei Lincei, a member of the Academy of Sciences of Turin and president of the Italian Geological Society. A passionate mountaineer and speleologist, he was an active member of the Italian Alpine Club for most of his life.

He was one of the founders in 1911–12 of the Urania Society, created as the result of a split from the Italian Astronomical Society, for which he directed the publication of Saggi di astronomia popolare, a series of popular texts.

He was the author of over six hundred publications, including volumes, memoirs and articles, of a geomorphological and stratigraphic nature. He made a significant contribution to the Geological Map of Italy, studying and compiling, among others, the geological sheets of the tertiary basin of Piedmont, Abruzzo, Cuneo, Ceva and Genoa, Bologna, Imola–Faenza–Forlì and Rimini, of Ancona–Jesi–Fermo and Macerata, Pesaro, Monte Falterona, Pontremoli.

Two of his most important works are: "Il bacino terziario e quaternario del Piemonte" ("The tertiary and quaternary basin of Piedmont"), complete with all geomorphological, stratigraphic and paleontological indications. And the multi-volume set "I molluschi dei terreni terziari del Piemonte e della Liguria" ("The molluscs of the tertiary lands of Piedmont and Liguria"), his largest work in terms of size and concreteness: completed in 1904, it is divided into 30 volumes and represents thousands of fossil species. The amount of his research and publications has no equal in the sectors he studied. He analyzed about 40,000 square kilometres of land and walked a distance equal to the length of the Equator line. Some of his geographical maps, which mainly represent the Alps and the Apennines, are present in the Archive of the Regional Science Museum of Turin.

As far as glaciation is concerned, he researched materials and carried out studies relating, in particular, to various locations in the Apennines and the Alps, with particular reference to Mont Blanc, Monte Rosa, the Matterhorn, Gran Paradiso, Monviso and the Maritime Alps. Appropriate publications he also dedicated to the moraines of the Veneto, Lake Maggiore, Ivrea and Rivoli. He also did research on hydrography, speleology, seismology and cosmology. He also dedicated biographies to illustrious scientists, including Carlo Fabrizio Parona and Giuseppe Mercalli.

== Recognition ==
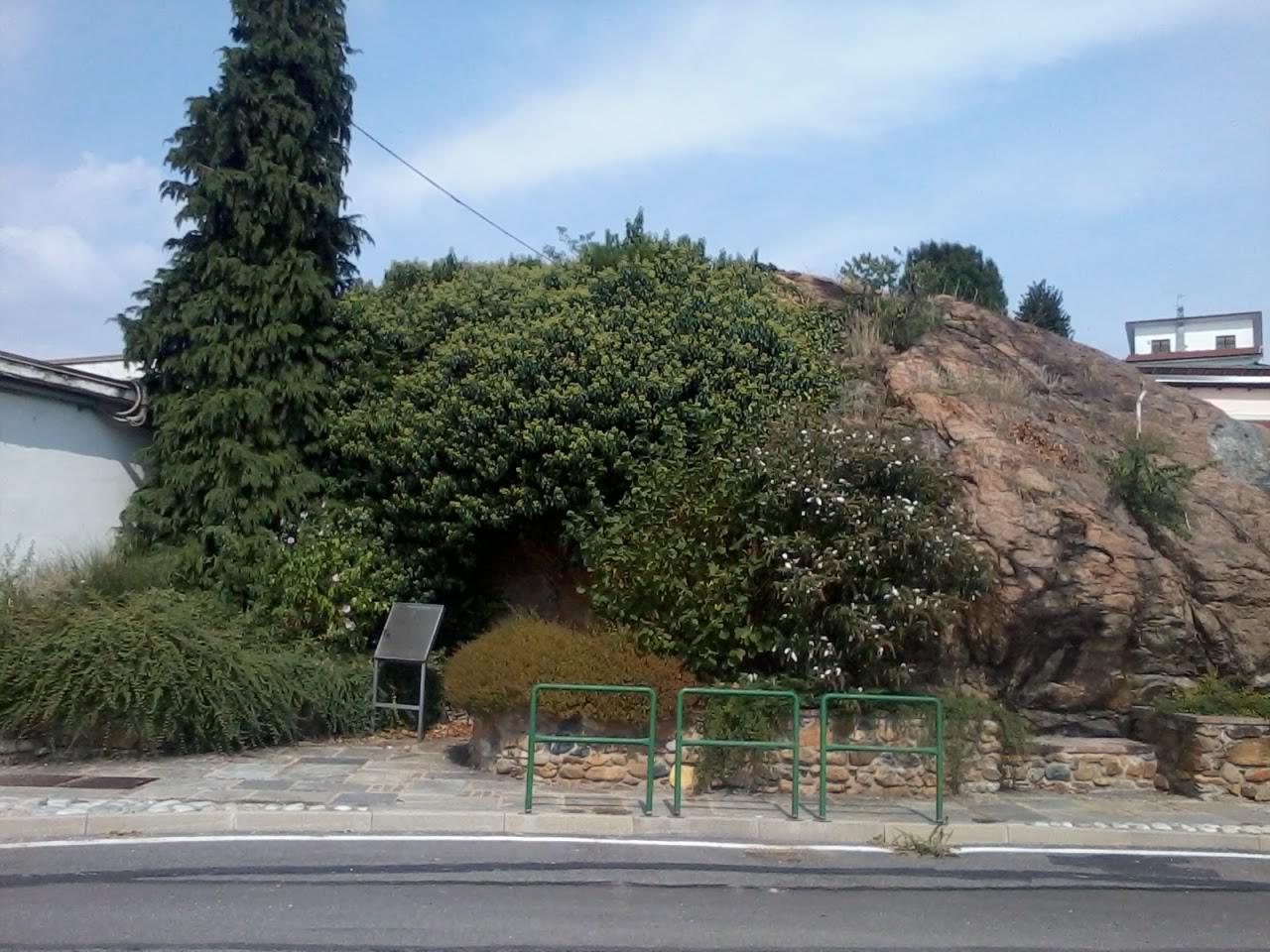
The erratic boulder dedicated to Federico Sacco at the entry to the village of Caselette

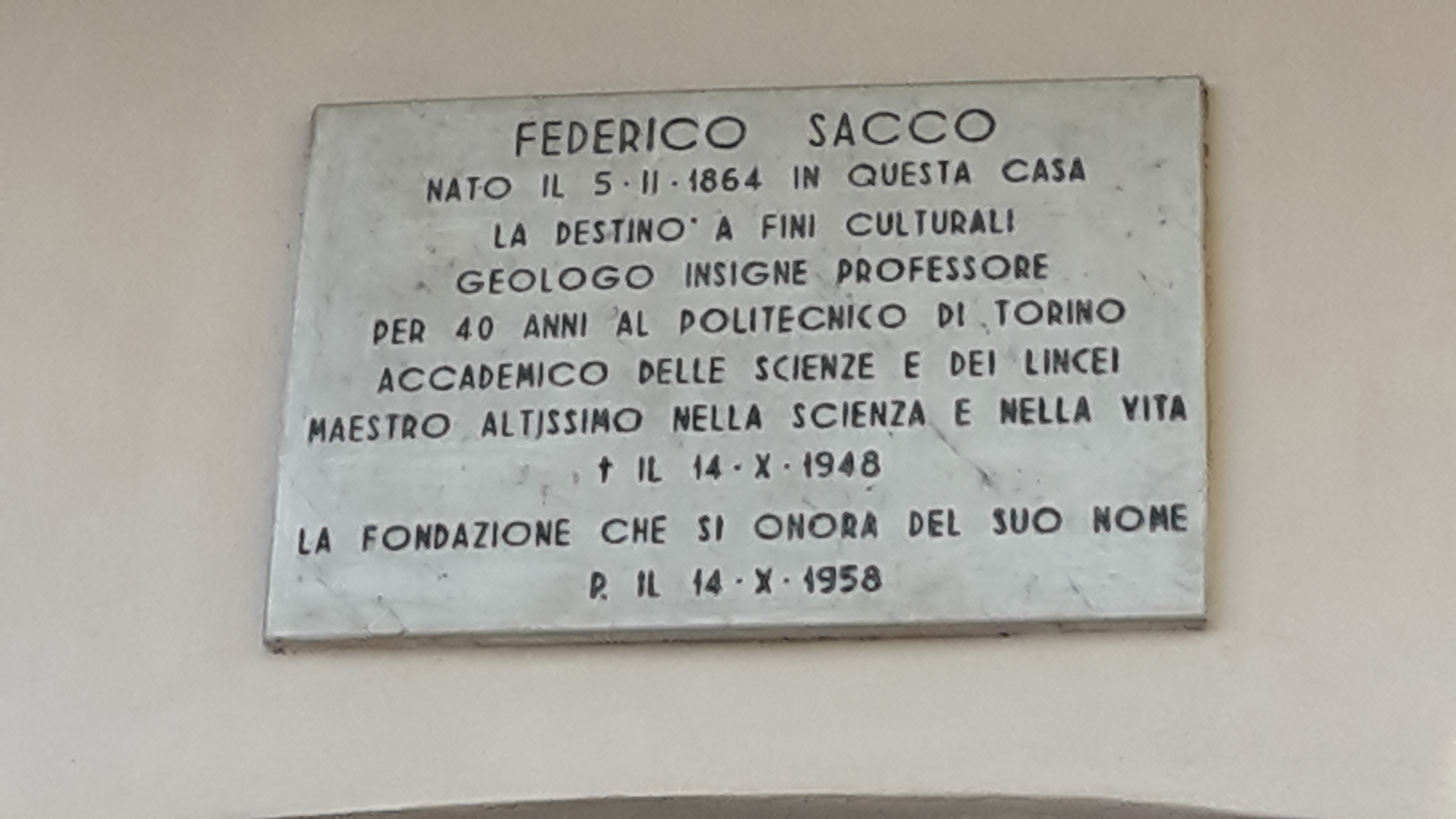
Plaque commemorating the 10th anniversary of Federico Sacco's death.

Above the door of Federico Sacco's house in Fossano, affixed to the wall, there is a plaque commemorating the tenth anniversary of the scholar's death, which shows an incorrect date of death and place: Turin, 14 October 1948.

In Fossano there is a school that has been dedicated to the scientist since 2019: the "Istituto Comprensivo Federico Sacco".

== Principal works ==
- I molluschi dei terreni terziari del Piemonte e della Liguria, (The molluscs of the tertiary lands of Piedmont and Liguria), 30 vols., partly also with Luigi Bellardi, Clausen, Turin 1872–1904.
- L'anfiteatro morenico di Rivoli ("The morainic amphitheater of Rivoli"), Lit. Doyen, Torino 1886.
- Sulla Costituzione geologica degli altipiani isolati di Fossano, Salmour e Banale (On the geological constitution of the isolated plateaus of Fossano, Salmour and Banale), Tip. Camilla e Bertolero, Torino 1887.
- Geologia applicata del bacino terziario e quaternario del Piemonte (Applied Geology of the Tertiary and Quaternary Basin of Piedmont), Tip. Nazionale, Roma 1890.
- L'Appennino settentrionale (parte centrale). Studio geologico (The Northern Apennines (central part). Geological Study), Tip. R. Accademia dei Lincei, Roma 1892.
- L'Appennino dell'Emilia. Studio geologico sommario (The Apennines of Emilia. Summary Geological Study), Tip. R. Accademia dei Lincei, Roma 1893.
- L'Appennino della Romagna. Studio geologico sommario (The Apennines of Romagna. Summary Geological Study), Tip. R. Accademia dei Lincei, Roma 1899.
- Gli anfiteatri morenici del Veneto. Studio geologico (The morainic amphitheatres of the Veneto. Geological Study), Tip. e Lit. Bertolero, Torino 1899
- L'Appennino settentrionale e centrale. Studio geologico sintetico (The northern and central Apennines. Synthetic geological study), Gerbone, Torino 1904.
- Geologia applicata dello Appennino settentrionale e centrale (Applied Geology of the Northern and Central Apennines), Tip. Camilla e Bertolero, Torino 1904.
- L'Appennino meridionale. Studio geologico sintetico (The Southern Apennines. Synthetic Geological Study), Tip. Cuggiani, Roma 1910.
- L'evolution biologique et humaine. Essai synthetique et considerations (Biological and Human Evolution. Synthetic Essay and Considerations), Utet-Beranger, Torino-Parigi 1910.
- Geoidrologia dei pozzi profondi della Valle Padana (Geohydrology of deep wells in the Po Valley), 3 voll., Bona, Torino 1912–1933.
- Universo. Saggio di sintesi cosmica (Universe. Essay on cosmic synthesis), Lattese & C., Torino 1916.
- Formazione dei serbatoi Montani. Considerazioni meteorologiche e geoidrologiche (Formation of Montani reservoirs. Meteorological and geohydrological consideration), Borzoni e C., Torino 1918.
- La sistemazione idrico-forestale dei bacini montani (The hydro-forestry arrangement of mountain basins), Tip. Nistri, Pisa 1918
- L'Istria. Cenni geologici generali (Istria. General geological notes), Soc. tip. Monregalese, Mondovì 1924.
- Origini ed evoluzione della vita (Origins and evolution of life), Ulrico Hoepli, Milano 1937.
- Come si è formata la faccia della Terra (How the Face of the Earth Was Formed), Tip. Checchini, Torino 1941.

== See also ==
- Category:Taxa named by Federico Sacco
