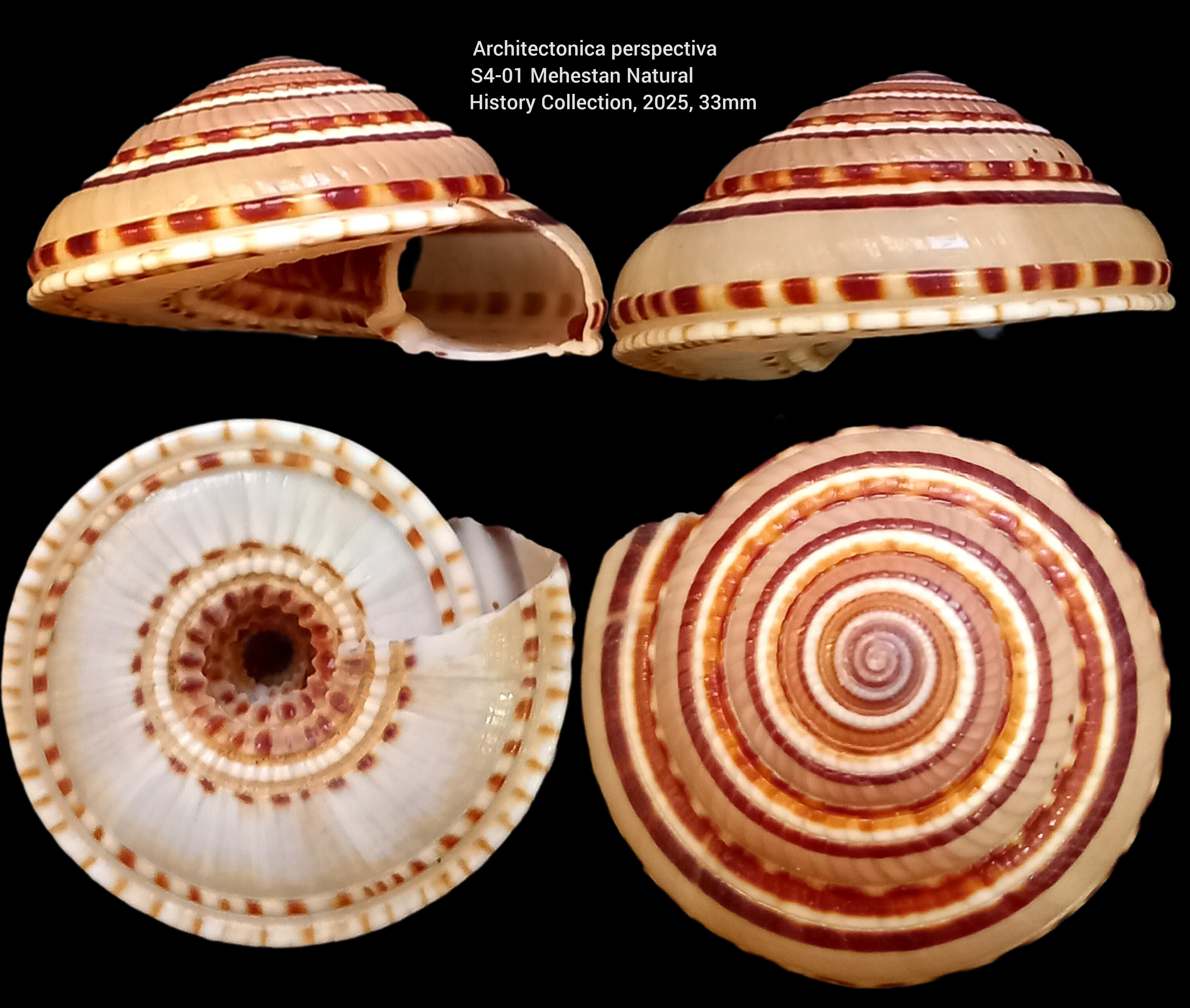
- Architectonica perspectiva Architectonicoidea

Scientific classification
- Kingdom: Animalia
- Phylum: Mollusca
- Class: Gastropoda
- Subclass: Heterobranchia
- Infraclass: "Lower Heterobranchia"

Superfamilies
- See text

= Lower Heterobranchia =

Infraclass of molluscs

Lower Heterobranchia, also known as the Allogastropoda, is a group of rather specialized, highly evolved sea slugs and sea snails, marine gastropod mollusks within the subclass Heterobranchia.

Although the great majority of Lower Heterobranchs are indeed marine, a few have succeeded in making the transition to freshwater.

== Description ==
The shell shapes in this group are typically those that are seen in the sundial, pyramid, rissoella and orbitestellid families of snails.

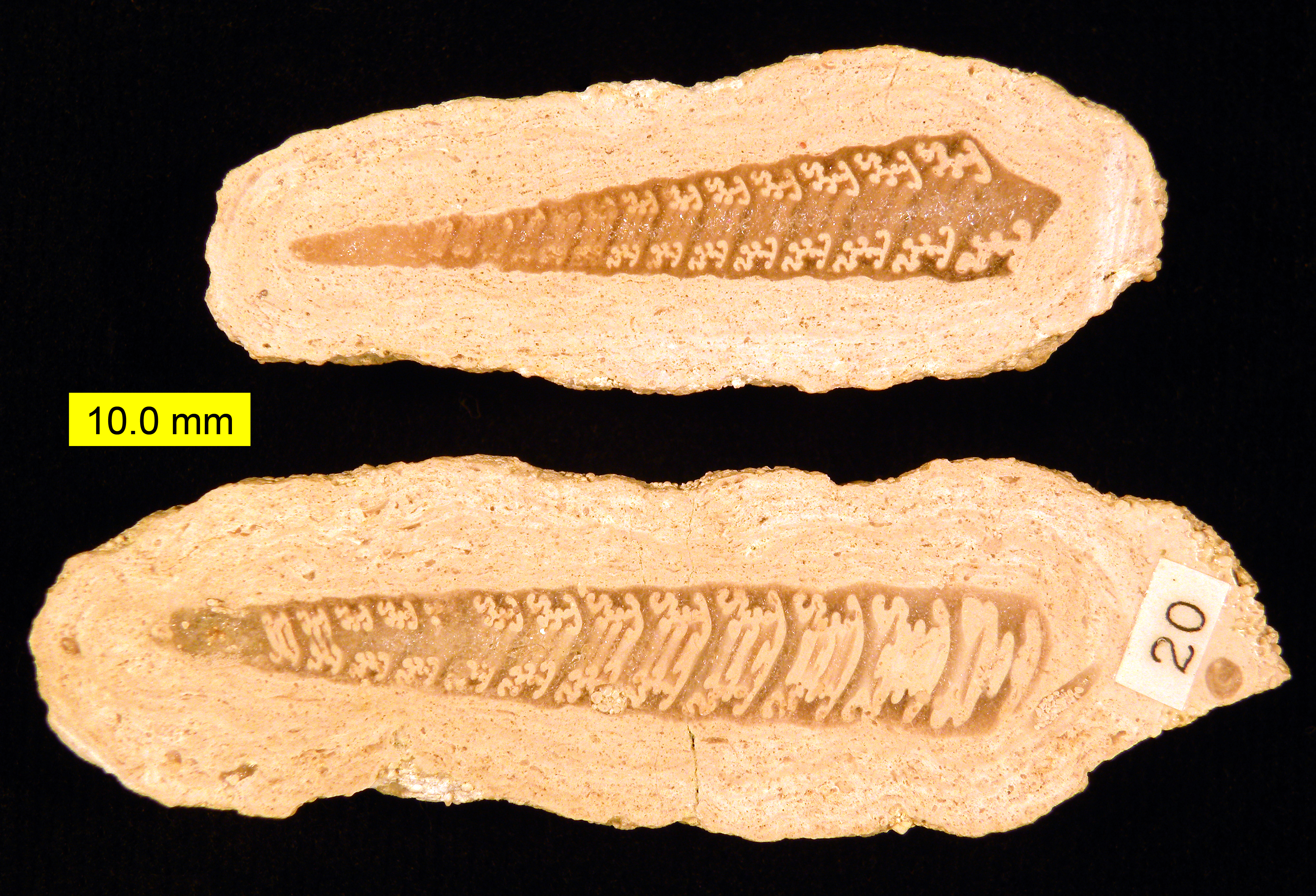
Bactroptyxis trachaea, family Nerineidae, superfamily Nerineoidea.

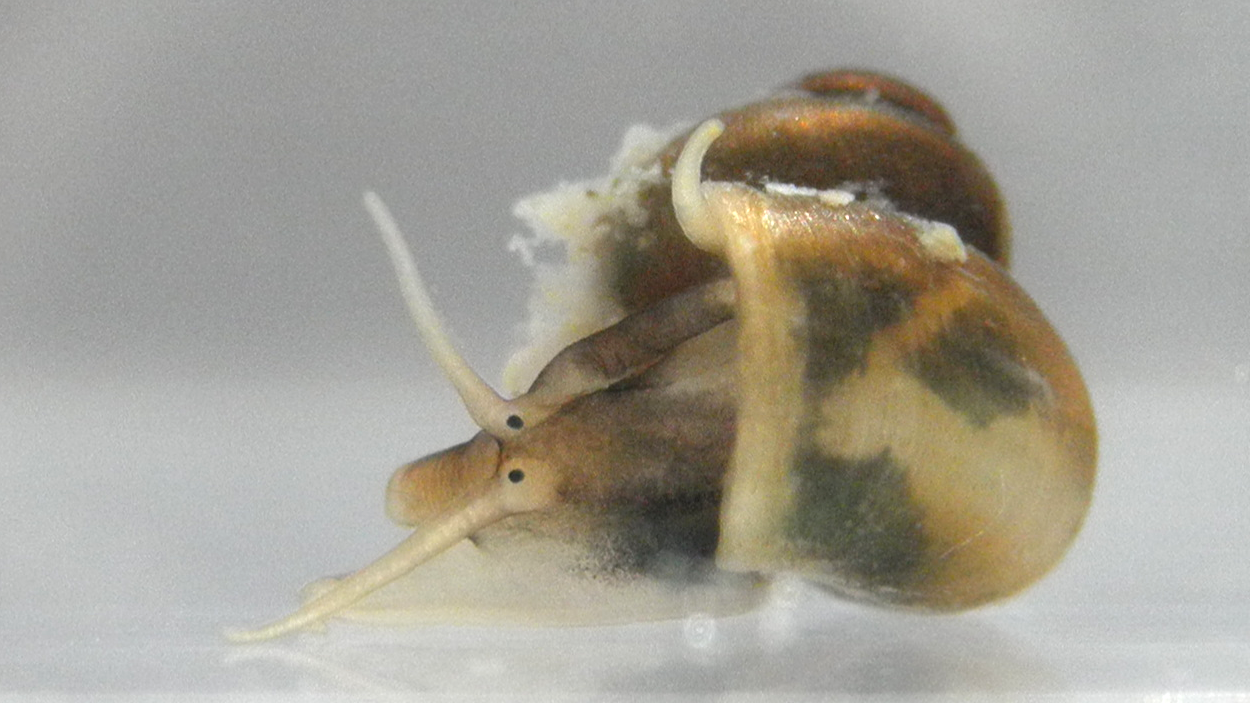
Valvata piscinalis, family Valvatidae, superfamily Valvatoidea.

== Taxonomy ==
=== 2005 taxonomy ===
In the taxonomy of the Gastropoda by Bouchet & Rocroi, 2005, the Lower Heterobranchia is an Informal Group. Superfamilies within the Lower Heterobranchia include:

- Unassigned to a superfamily (orbitestellid-shells)
  - Family Cimidae
  - † Family Dolomitellidae
  - † Family Heterosubulitidae
  - † Family Kuskokwimiidae
  - † Family Misurinellidae
  - Family Orbitestellidae
  - Family Tjaernoeiidae
  - Family Xylodisculidae
- superfamily Acteonoidea
- superfamily Architectonicoidea
- superfamily Glacidorboidea
- superfamily Mathildoidea
- † superfamily Nerineoidea
- superfamily Omalogyroidea
- superfamily Pyramidelloidea
- superfamily Ringiculoidea
- superfamily Rissoelloidea
- † superfamily Streptacidoidea
- superfamily Valvatoidea

(Taxa that are exclusively fossil are indicated with a dagger †) For a more detailed taxonomy see: Taxonomy of the Gastropoda (Bouchet & Rocroi, 2005)#Informal group "Lower Heterobranchia" (= Allogastropoda)

=== 2010 taxonomy ===
Jörger et al. (2010) have redefined major groups within the Heterobranchia: they moved Glacidorboidea and Pyramidelloidea to Panpulmonata.

=== 2014 taxonomy ===
Wägele et al. (2014): moved Rissoelloidea and Acteonoidea from Lower Heterobranchia to Euthyneura.

=== 2016 taxonomy ===
Kano et al. (2016): moved Ringiculoidea from Lower Heterobranchia to Euthyneura.

So the following taxa remain within the Lower Heterobranchia:

- Unassigned to a superfamily (orbitestellid-shells)
  - Family Cimidae
  - † Family Dolomitellidae
  - † Family Heterosubulitidae
  - † Family Kuskokwimiidae
  - † Family Misurinellidae
  - Family Orbitestellidae
  - Family Tjaernoeiidae
  - Family Xylodisculidae
- superfamily Architectonicoidea
- superfamily Mathildoidea
- † superfamily Nerineoidea
- superfamily Omalogyroidea
- † superfamily Streptacidoidea
- superfamily Valvatoidea
