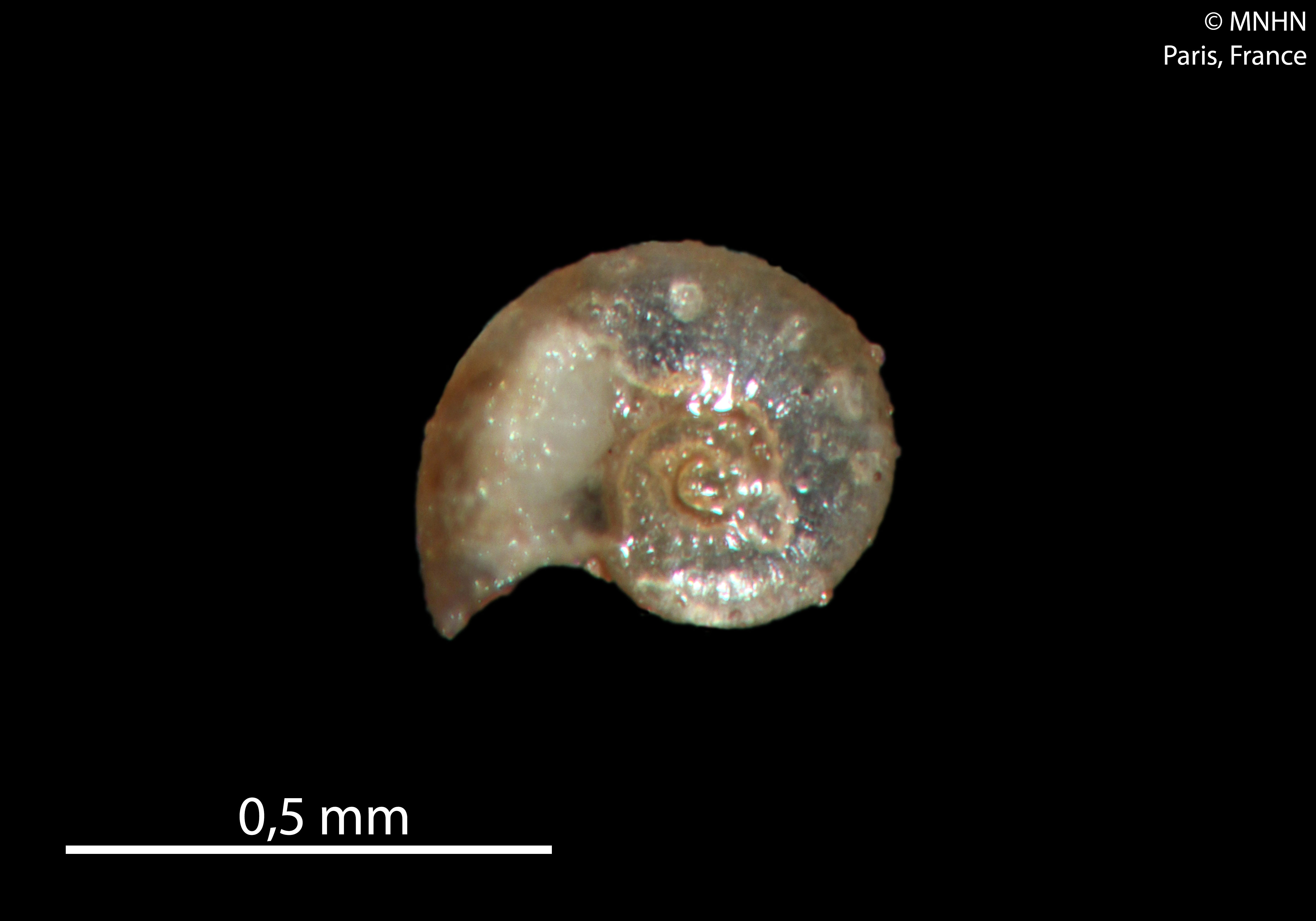
- Shell of Omalogyra zebrina (paratype at MNHN, Paris)

Scientific classification
- Kingdom: Animalia
- Phylum: Mollusca
- Class: Gastropoda
- Infraclass: "Lower Heterobranchia"
- Superfamily: Omalogyroidea
- Family: Omalogyridae
- Genus: Omalogyra; Jeffreys, 1860

Type species
- Skenea nitidissima (Adams, 1800), sensu Forbes & Hanley, 1850

Synonyms
- Ammonicerina O. G. Costa, 1861; Helisalia Laseron, 1954; Homalogyra Jeffreys, 1867 (unjustified emendation)

= Omalogyra =

Genus of gastropods

Omalogyra is a genus of minute marine gastropod molluscs in the family Omalogyridae.

This genus includes the smallest gastropods, with adult sizes of 1 mm and even less.

== Species ==
Species within the genus Omalogyra include:

- Omalogyra ammonitoides (Powell, 1940)
- Omalogyra antarctica Egorova, 1991
- Omalogyra atomus (Philippi, 1841) - atom snail
- Omalogyra burdwoodiana Strebel, 1908
- Omalogyra densicostata (Jeffreys, 1884)
- Omalogyra disculus Palazzi, 1988
- Omalogyra fusca Suter, 1908(Jeffreys, 1884)
- Omalogyra fuscopardalis Rolán, 1992
- Omalogyra liliputia (Laseron, 1954)
- Omalogyra simplex (Costa O.G., 1861)
- Omalogyra taludana Castellanos, 1989
- Omalogyra undosa Palazzi, 1988
- Omalogyra zebrina Rolán, 1992

Species brought into synonymy

- Omalogyra (Ammonicera) Vayssière, 1893: synonym of Ammonicera Vayssière, 1893
- Omalogyra (Ammonicera) planorbis (Dall, 1927): synonym of Palazzia planorbis (Dall, 1927)
- Omalogyra (Ammonicera) rota Forbes & Hanley, 1850: synonym of Ammonicera rota (Forbes & Hanley, 1850)
- Omalogyra atomus (Philippi, 1841) sensu Arnaud, 1972: synonym of Omalogyra antarctica Egorova, 1991 (misapplication)
- Omalogyra ausonia Palazzi, 1988: synonym of Palazzia ausonia (Palazzi, 1988)
- Omalogyra bicarinata Suter, 1908: synonym of Zerotula bicarinata (Suter, 1908)
- Omalogyra discula Palazzi, 1988: synonym of Omalogyra disculus Palazzi, 1988
- Omalogyra fischeriana Monterosato, 1869: synonym of Ammonicera fischeriana (Monterosato, 1869)
- Omalogyra nodicarinata Sleurs, 1983: synonym of Ammonicera nodicarinata (Sleurs, 1985)
- Omalogyra planorbis (Dall, 1927): synonym of Palazzia planorbis (Dall, 1927)
- Omalogyra pulcherrima Brazier in Henn & Brazier, 1894: synonym of Liotella pulcherrima (Brazier in Henn & Brazier, 1894)
- Omalogyra vangoethemi Sleurs, 1983: synonym of Ammonicera vangoethemi (Sleurs, 1985)
