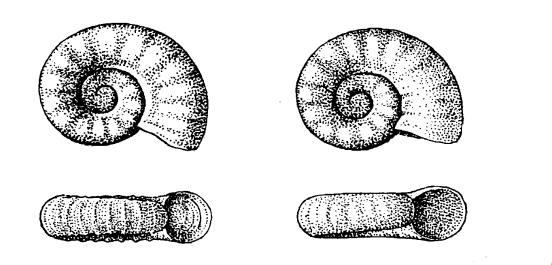
- Shell of Ammonicera japonica (holotype)

Scientific classification
- Kingdom: Animalia
- Phylum: Mollusca
- Class: Gastropoda
- Family: Omalogyridae
- Genus: Ammonicera
- Species: A. japonica

Binomial name
- Ammonicera japonica Habe, 1972

= Ammonicera japonica =

Species of gastropod

Ammonicera japonica is a species of minute sea snail, a marine gastropod mollusc in the family Omalogyridae.

== Description ==
The major diameter of the shell is 0.68 mm and minor diameter 0.5 mm.

(Original description) The thin, yet solidly constructed shell is extremely small, measuring less than 1 mm in diameter when fully grown. Fresh specimens are dark brown, while dead shells are ashy white. The shell features 16 regularly arranged white radial streaks along the periphery and is planorboid and biconcave, resembling the freshwater pulmonate snail Gyraulus.

The shell contains 3 to 3.5 whorls. These are marked by deep sutures and constricted by regularly spaced annulations, with approximately 16 annulations present on the body whorl. The peripheral area is smooth, giving the shell an ammonite-like appearance. The aperture is circular, with a continuous peristome.

It forms a homogeneous group with Ammonicera nodicarinata and Ammonicera vangoethemi, based don the presence of one strong groove on the protoconch and at least one axial sculpture on the teleoconch.

== Distribution ==
This species occurs off Japan and Korea; also in the Indian Ocean off Réunion; in the Pacific off Hawaii; off Papua New Guinea and off the United Arab Emirates.
