= Ammonicera nolai =

Scientific classification
- Kingdom: Animalia
- Phylum: Mollusca
- Class: Gastropoda
- Family: Omalogyridae
- Genus: Ammonicera
- Species: A. nolai

Binomial name
- Ammonicera nolai Rolán, 1992

Species of gastropod

Ammonicera nolai is a species of minute sea snail, a marine gastropod mollusc in the family Omalogyridae.

== Description ==
The length of the shell attains 0.9 mm.

== Distribution ==
This marine species occurs in the Atlantic Ocean off Cape Verde.
