= Ammonicera mexicana =

Scientific classification
- Kingdom: Animalia
- Phylum: Mollusca
- Class: Gastropoda
- Family: Omalogyridae
- Genus: Ammonicera
- Species: A. mexicana

Binomial name
- Ammonicera mexicana Sartori & Bieler, 2014

Species of gastropod

Ammonicera mexicana is a species of minute sea snail, a marine gastropod mollusc in the family Omalogyridae.

== Description ==
The major diameter of the shell is 0.57 mm and a minor diameter of 0.48 mm.

== Distribution ==
This species occurs off the west coast of Mexico.
