= Ammonicera verdensis =

Scientific classification
- Kingdom: Animalia
- Phylum: Mollusca
- Class: Gastropoda
- Family: Omalogyridae
- Genus: Ammonicera
- Species: A. verdensis

Binomial name
- Ammonicera verdensis Rolán, 1992

Species of gastropod

Ammonicera verdensis is a species of minute sea snail, a marine gastropod mollusc in the family Omalogyridae.

== Distribution ==
This marine species occurs in the Atlantic Ocean off Cape Verde.
