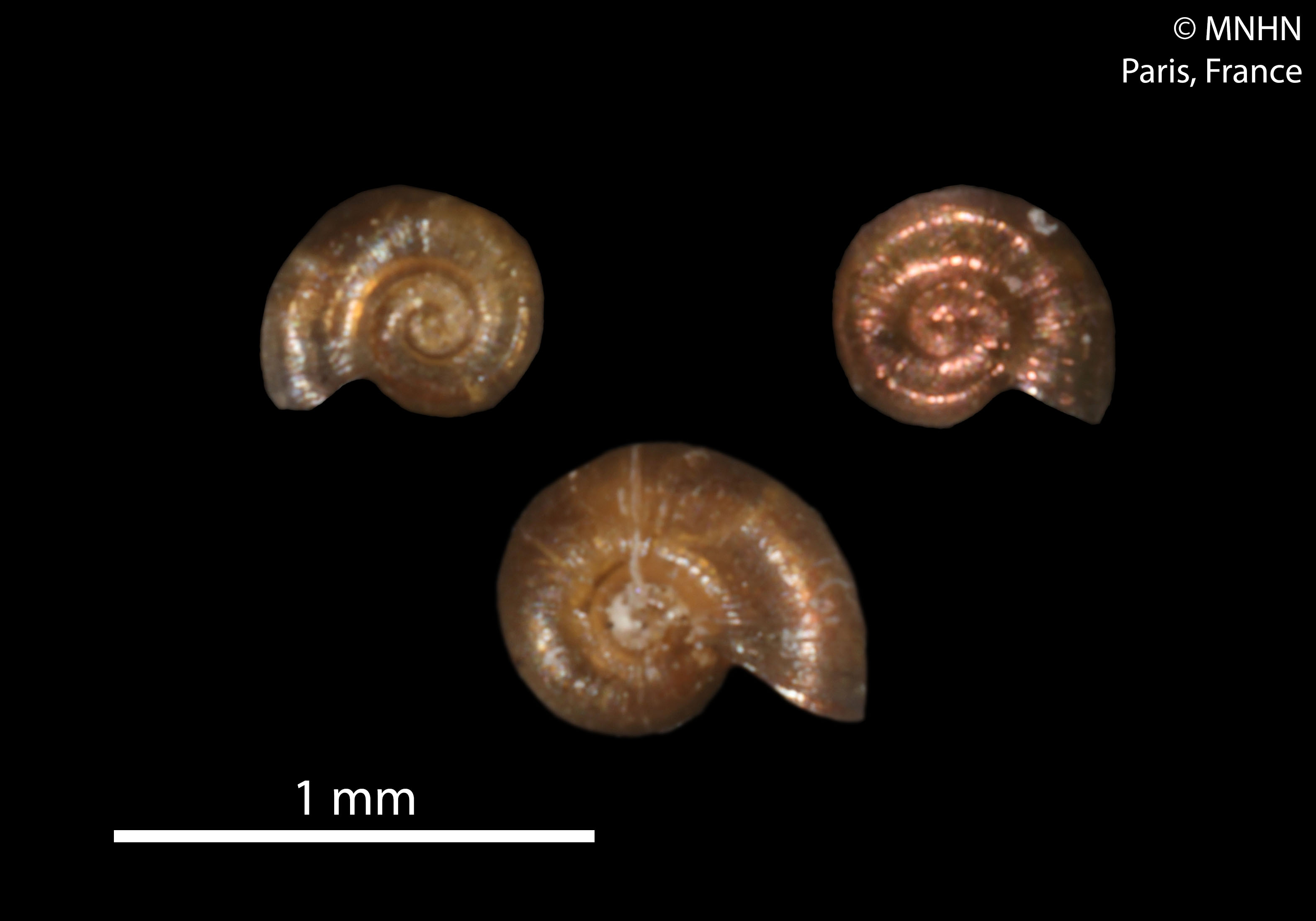
- Shell of Retrotortina damara (paratype at MNHN, Paris)

Scientific classification
- Kingdom: Animalia
- Phylum: Mollusca
- Class: Gastropoda
- Infraclass: "Lower Heterobranchia"
- Superfamily: Omalogyroidea
- Family: Omalogyridae
- Genus: Retrotortina; Chaster, 1896

Type species
- Retrotortina fuscata Chaster, 1896

= Retrotortina =

Genus of gastropods

Retrotortina is a genus of very minute sea snails, marine gastropod molluscs or micromollusks in the family Omalogyridae.

== Species ==
Species within the genus Retrotortina include:

- Retrotortina cuniculus Barnard, 1969
- Retrotortina damara Rolán & Peñas, 2009
- Retrotortina fuscata Chaster, 1896
