= Ammonicera extracarinacostata =

Scientific classification
- Kingdom: Animalia
- Phylum: Mollusca
- Class: Gastropoda
- Family: Omalogyridae
- Genus: Ammonicera
- Species: A. extracarinacostata

Binomial name
- Ammonicera extracarinacostata Sleurs, 1985

Species of gastropod

Ammonicera extracarinacostata is a species of minute sea snail, a marine gastropod mollusc in the family Omalogyridae.

== Distribution ==
This marine species occurs off the Seychelles and Madagascar.
