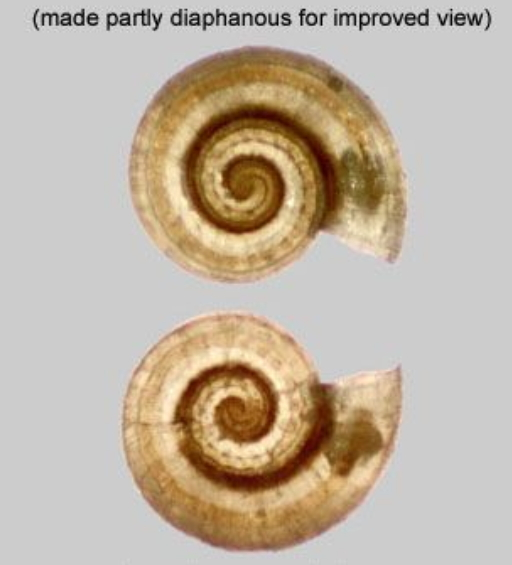
- Shell of Ammonicera arrondoi (specimen at the Natural History Museum Rotterdam)

Scientific classification
- Kingdom: Animalia
- Phylum: Mollusca
- Class: Gastropoda
- Family: Omalogyridae
- Genus: Ammonicera
- Species: A. arrondoi

Binomial name
- Ammonicera arrondoi J. D. Oliver & Rolán, 2015

= Ammonicera arrondoi =

Species of gastropod

Ammonicera arrondoi is a species of minute sea snail, a marine gastropod mollusc in the family Omalogyridae.

== Description ==
Shell 0.4-0.6 mm; disc-shaped, 2-2.5 planar scrolled whorls; aperture circular, somewhat narrowed by the previous whorl; sculpture: wavy ribs, above and below nodose, furthermore spiral grooves, 3 on each side, above and below, 1-2 of which visible on the inner whorls, in particular towards the protoconch the second one becomes distinctly separated from the suture; shell yellow-brownish, transparent.

== Distribution ==
This marine species occurs in the Mediterranean Sea off Spain (Balearic Islands) and Turkey.
