= Ammonicera mcleani =

Scientific classification
- Domain: Eukaryota
- Kingdom: Animalia
- Phylum: Mollusca
- Class: Gastropoda
- Family: Omalogyridae
- Genus: Ammonicera
- Species: A. mcleani

Binomial name
- Ammonicera mcleani Sartori & Bieler, 2014

Species of gastropod

Ammonicera mcleani is a species of minute sea snail, a marine gastropod mollusc in the family Omalogyridae.

== Description ==
The major diameter of the shell is O.52 mm and minor diameter O.38 mm.

== Distribution ==
This species occurs off Baja California, Mexico.
