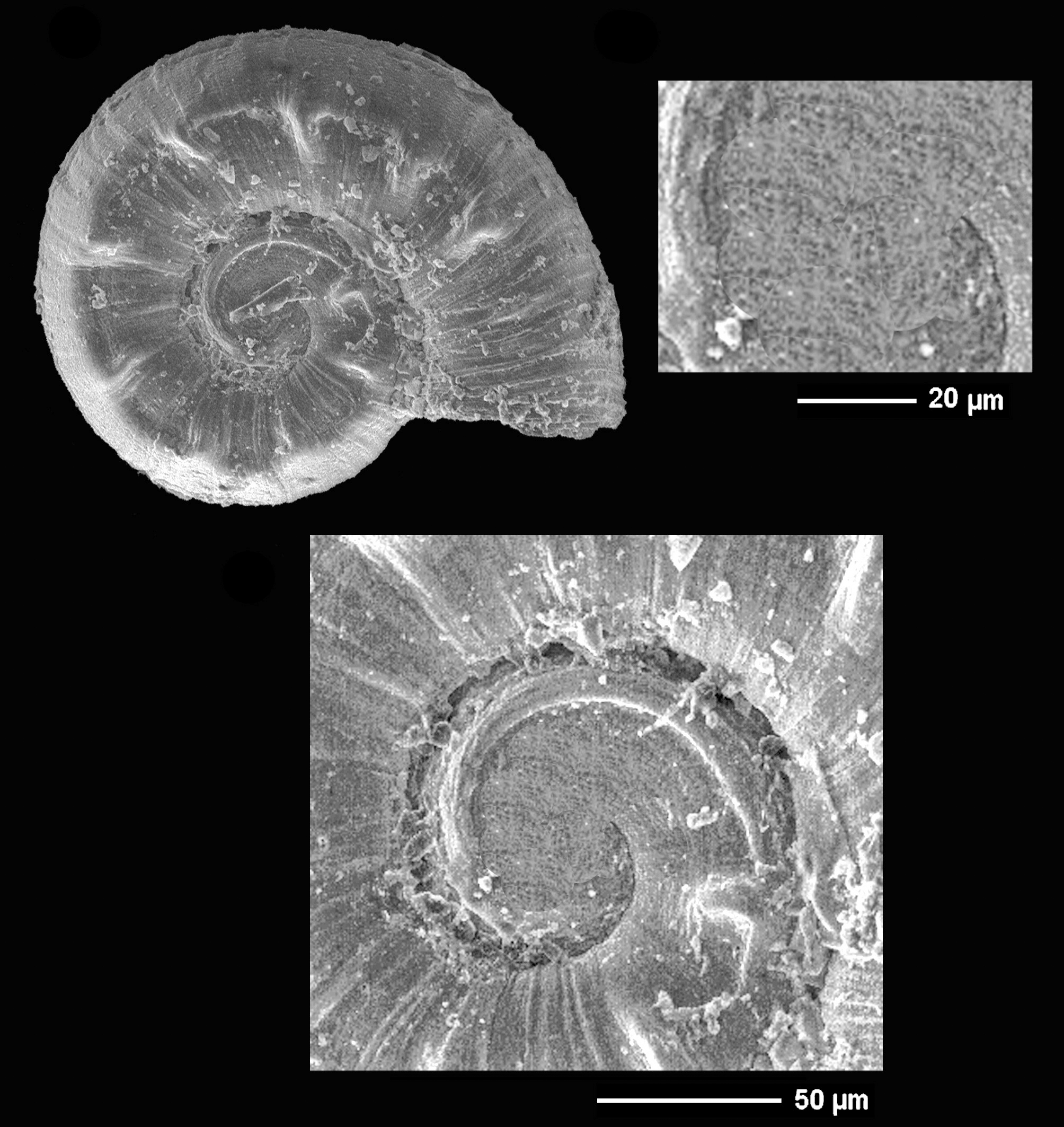
- Shell of Ammonicera tahitiensis (holotype at MNHN, Paris)

Scientific classification
- Kingdom: Animalia
- Phylum: Mollusca
- Class: Gastropoda
- Family: Omalogyridae
- Genus: Ammonicera
- Species: A. tahitiensis

Binomial name
- Ammonicera tahitiensis Rubio, Rolán & J. Letourneux, 2020

= Ammonicera tahitiensis =

Species of gastropod

Ammonicera tahitiensis is a species of minute sea snail, a marine gastropod mollusc in the family Omalogyridae.

== Distribution ==
This species occurs in the Pacific Ocean off Tahiti.
