= Ammonicera albospeciosa =

Scientific classification
- Kingdom: Animalia
- Phylum: Mollusca
- Class: Gastropoda
- Family: Omalogyridae
- Genus: Ammonicera
- Species: A. albospeciosa

Binomial name
- Ammonicera albospeciosa Rolán, 1992

Species of gastropod

Ammonicera albospeciosa is a species of minute sea snail, a marine gastropod mollusc in the family Omalogyridae.

== Description ==
The diameter of the shell varies between 0.4 mm and 0.6 mm.

== Distribution ==
This marine species occurs off Cuba and the Bahamas.
