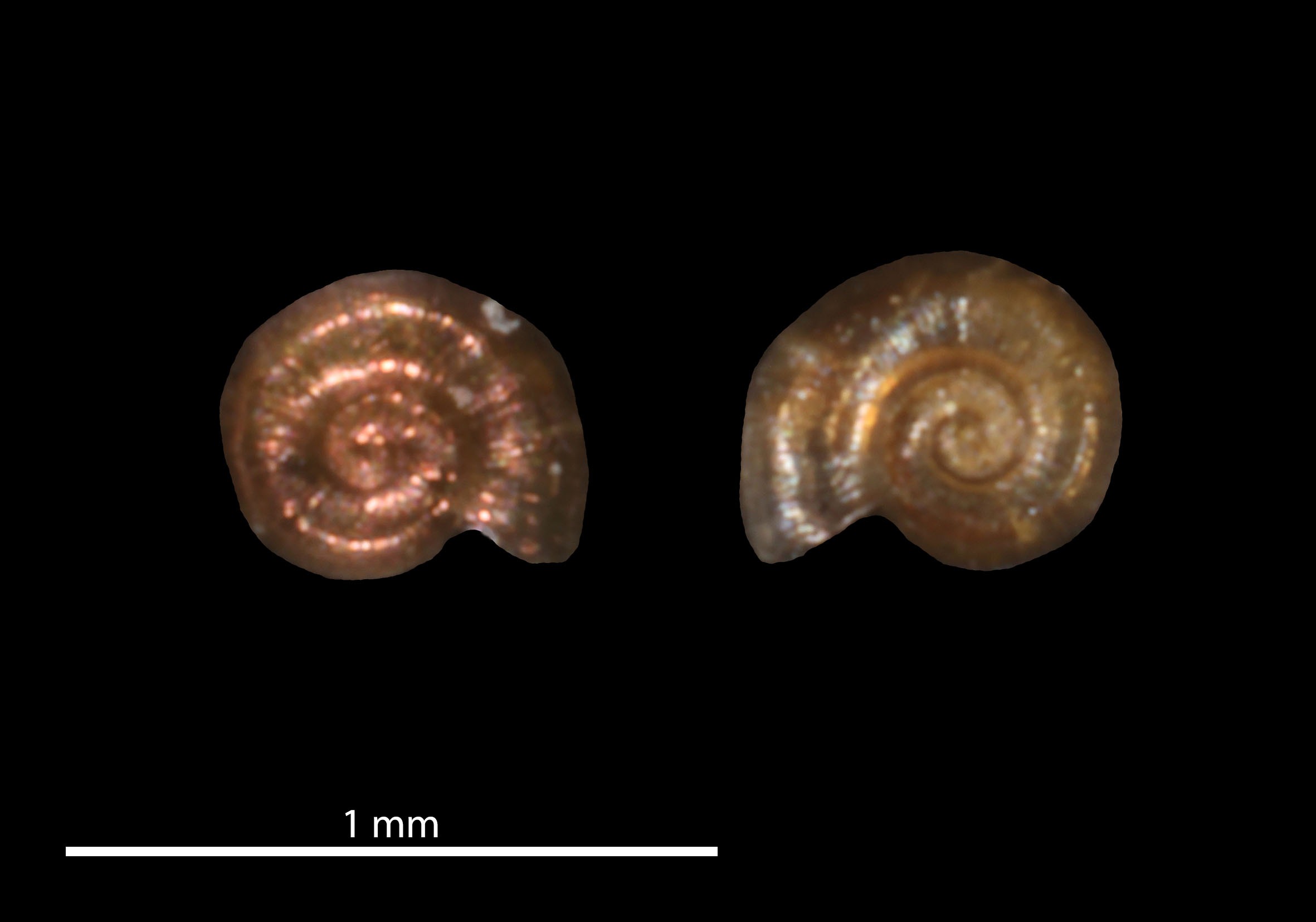
- Shell of Ammonicera san (paratype in the MNHN, Paris)

Scientific classification
- Kingdom: Animalia
- Phylum: Mollusca
- Class: Gastropoda
- Family: Omalogyridae
- Genus: Ammonicera
- Species: A. san

Binomial name
- Ammonicera san Rolán & Peñas, 2009

= Ammonicera san =

Species of gastropod

Ammonicera san is a species of minute sea snail, a marine gastropod mollusc in the family Omalogyridae.

== Distribution ==
This species occurs in the Atlantic Ocean off Namibia.
