= Omalogyra fusca =

Scientific classification
- Kingdom: Animalia
- Phylum: Mollusca
- Class: Gastropoda
- Family: Omalogyridae
- Genus: Omalogyra
- Species: O. fusca

Binomial name
- Omalogyra fusca Suter, 1908

Species of gastropod

Omalogyra fusca is a species of small sea snail, a marine gastropod mollusc in the family Omalogyridae.
