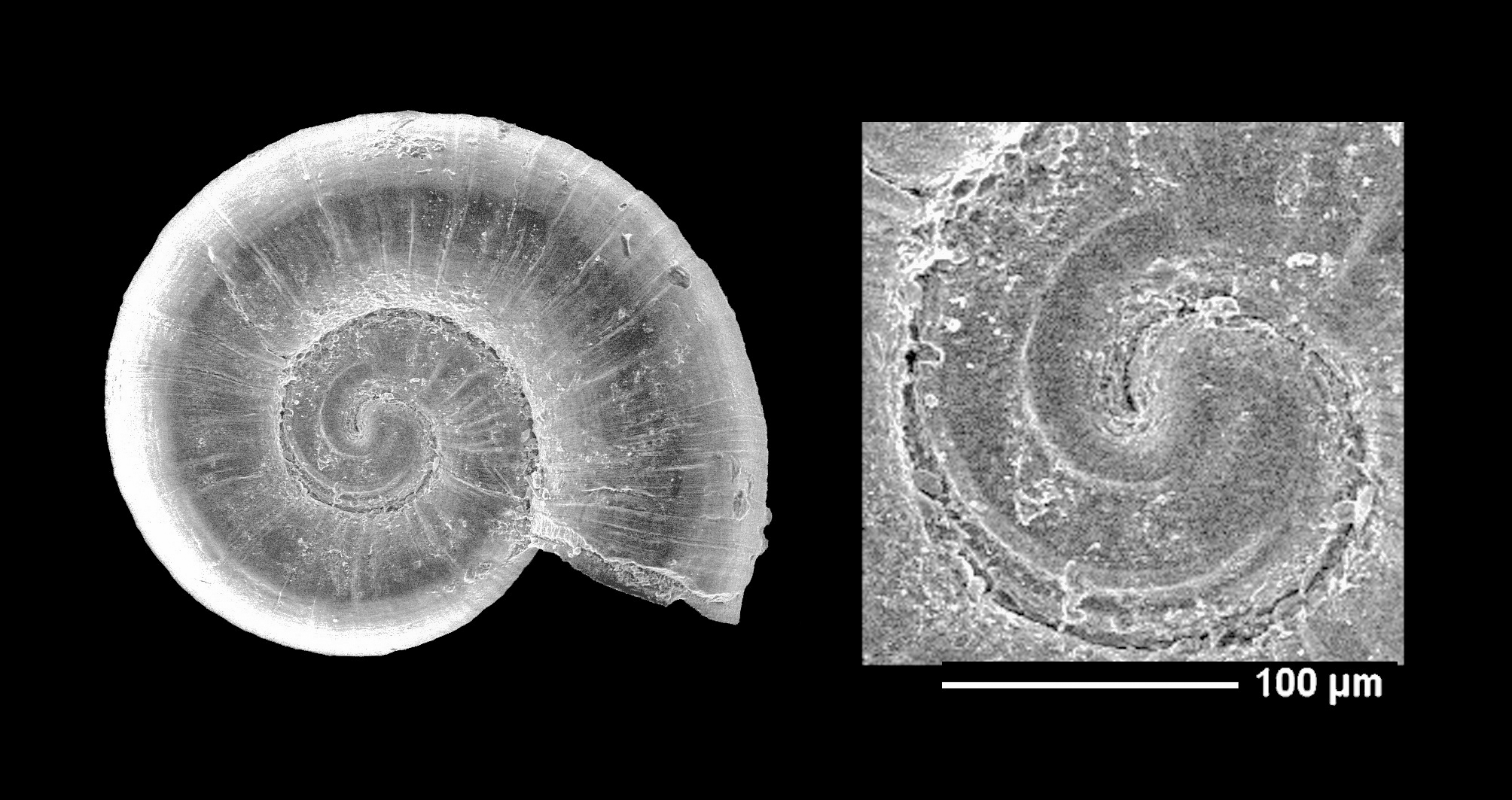
- Shell of Ammonicera croata (holotype at MNHN, Paris)

Scientific classification
- Kingdom: Animalia
- Phylum: Mollusca
- Class: Gastropoda
- Family: Omalogyridae
- Genus: Ammonicera
- Species: A. croata

Binomial name
- Ammonicera croata Rubio & Rolán, 2020

= Ammonicera croata =

Species of gastropod

Ammonicera croata is a species of minute sea snail, a marine gastropod mollusc in the family Omalogyridae.

== Description ==
Holotype 0.45 mm; disc-shaped, 2-2.5 planar scrolled whorls, not keeled; aperture circular, slightly indented towards the previous whorl; sculpture: no ribs, practically smooth, only fine growth lines; shell yellowish-white

== Distribution ==
This marine species occurs in the Adriatic Sea off Croatia.
