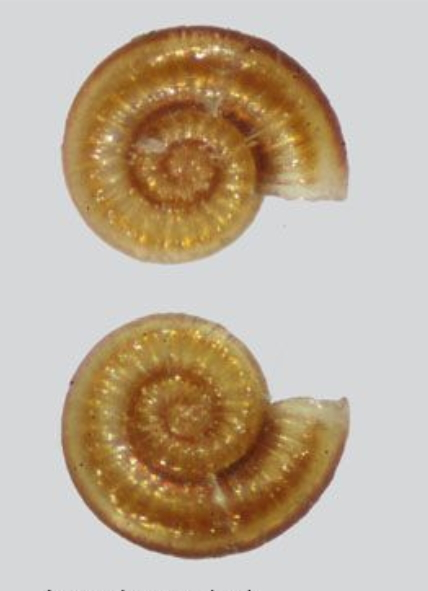
- Shell of Ammonicera andresi (specimen at the Natural History Museum Rotterdam)

Scientific classification
- Kingdom: Animalia
- Phylum: Mollusca
- Class: Gastropoda
- Family: Omalogyridae
- Genus: Ammonicera
- Species: A. andresi

Binomial name
- Ammonicera andresi J. D. Oliver & Rolán, 2015

= Ammonicera andresi =

Species of gastropod

Ammonicera andresi is a species of minute sea snail, a marine gastropod mollusc in the family Omalogyridae.

== Description ==
Shell around 0.9 mm; disc-shaped, almost 3 planar scrolled whorls, peripherally, above and below keeled; aperture circular, somewhat narrowed by the previous whorl, lip sharp; sculpture: weak to strong radial ribs, 20-30 on the last whorl, above and below nodose, the nodes may be connected by a spiral thread or furrow; shell yellow-brown, maybe with a brown spiral band

== Distribution ==
This marine species occurs in the Mediterranean Sea off Spain, France and the Balearic Islands).
