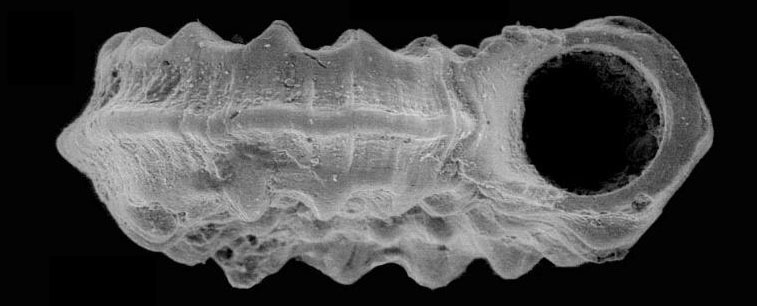
- Shell of Ammonicera gonzalezi (paratype at MNHN, Paris)

Scientific classification
- Kingdom: Animalia
- Phylum: Mollusca
- Class: Gastropoda
- Family: Omalogyridae
- Genus: Ammonicera
- Species: A. gonzalezi

Binomial name
- Ammonicera gonzalezi Rolán & Rubio, 2017

= Ammonicera gonzalezi =

Species of gastropod

Ammonicera gonzalezi is a species of minute sea snail, a marine gastropod mollusc in the family Omalogyridae.

== Description ==
The size of the shell attains 0.61 mm.

== Distribution ==
This species occurs in the Red Sea off Egypt.
