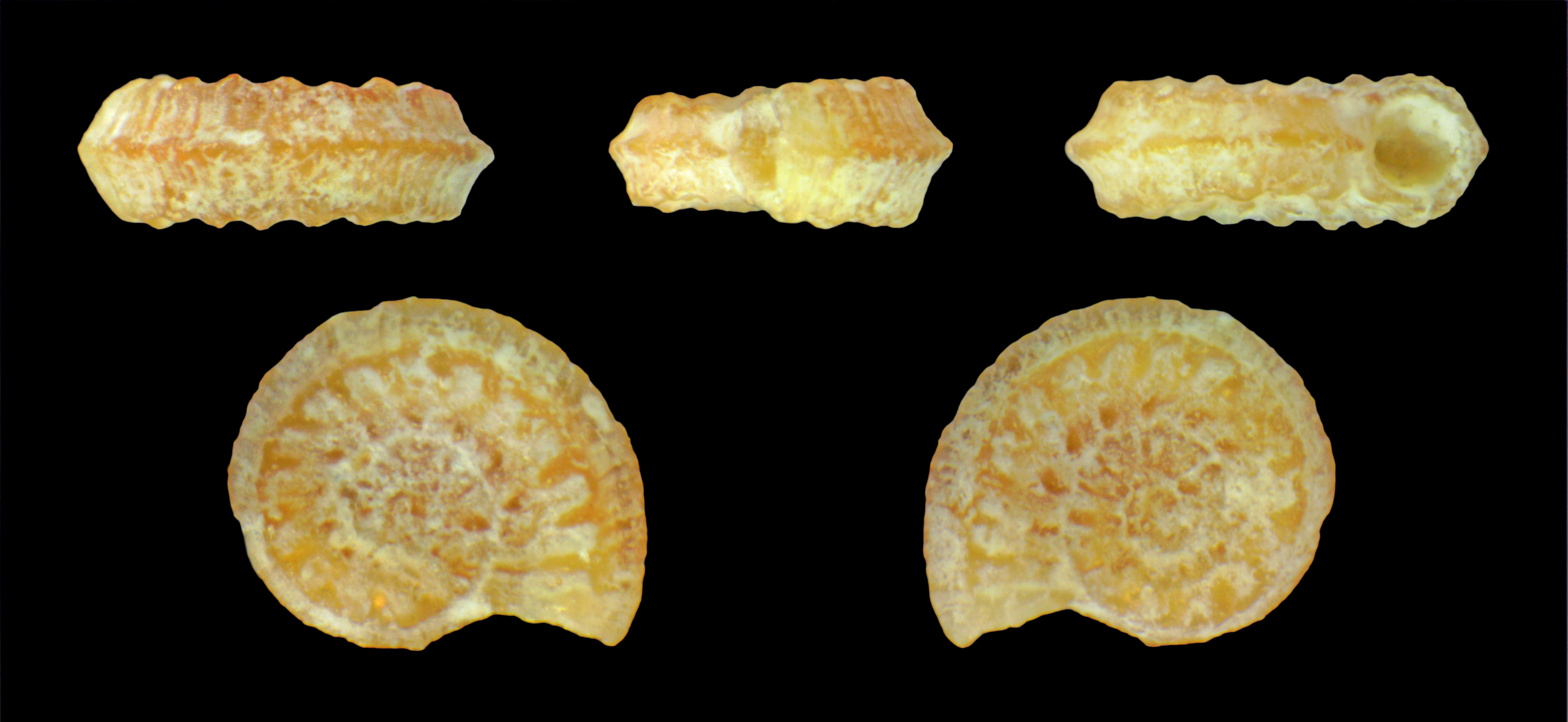
- Shell of Ammonicera binodosa

Scientific classification
- Kingdom: Animalia
- Phylum: Mollusca
- Class: Gastropoda
- Family: Omalogyridae
- Genus: Ammonicera
- Species: A. binodosa

Binomial name
- Ammonicera binodosa Sleurs, 1985

= Ammonicera binodosa =

Species of gastropod

Ammonicera binodosa is a species of minute sea snail, a marine gastropod mollusc in the family Omalogyridae.

== Description ==
The size of the shell attains 0.73 mm.

== Distribution ==
This marine species occurs off the Maldives, Sri Lanka and Thailand.
