= Ammonicera eocaenica =

Scientific classification
- Domain: Eukaryota
- Kingdom: Animalia
- Phylum: Mollusca
- Class: Gastropoda
- Family: Omalogyridae
- Genus: Ammonicera
- Species: †A. eocaenica

Binomial name
- †Ammonicera eocaenica (Allix, 1923)

Synonyms
- † Homalogyra eocaenica Allix, 1923 superseded combination

Species of gastropod

Ammonicera eocaenica is an extinct species of minute sea snail, a marine gastropod mollusc in the family Omalogyridae.

== Distribution ==
Fossils of this species were found in Eocene strata in Île-de-France and Loire-Atlantique, France.
