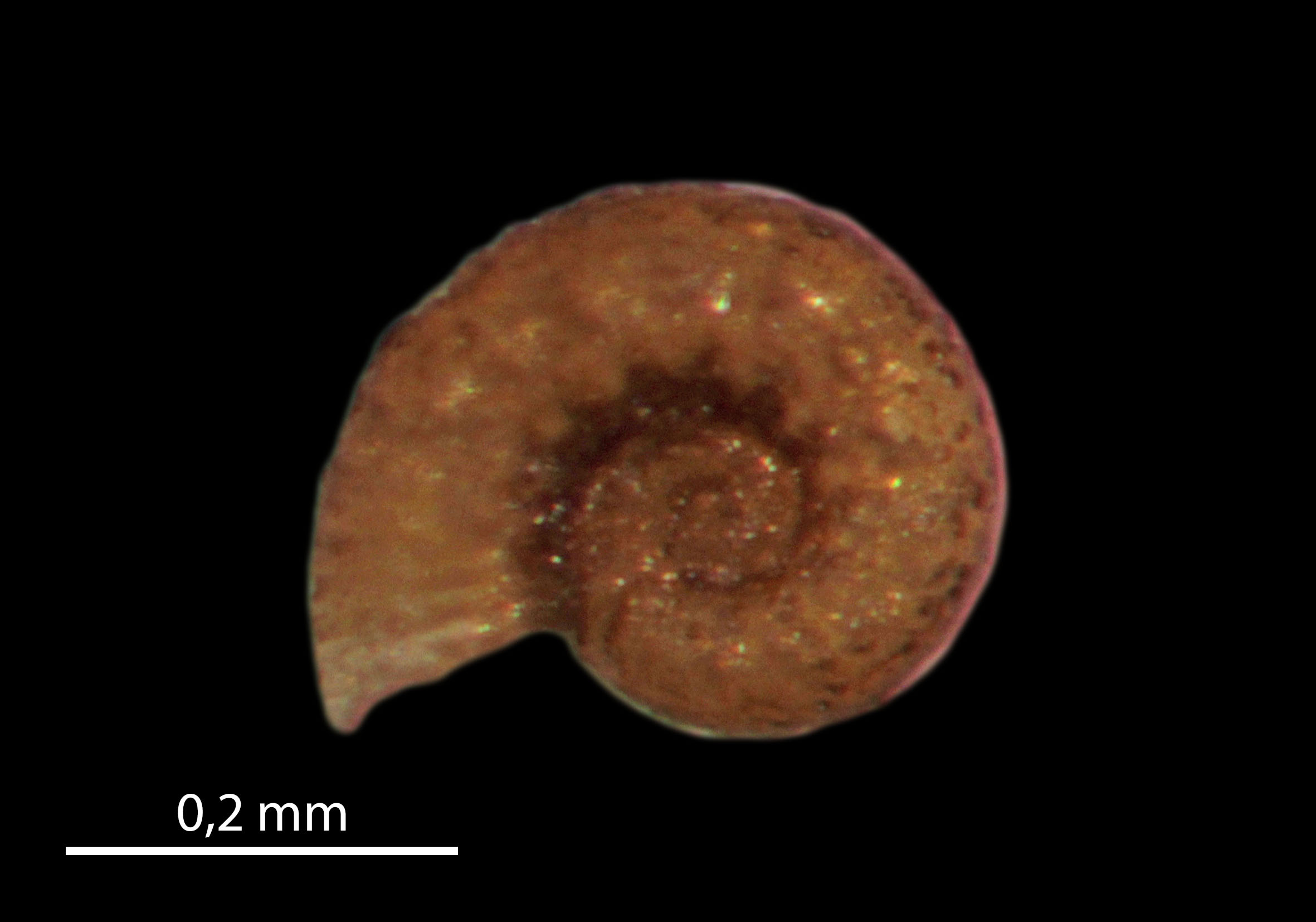
- Shell of Ammonicera minortalis (paratype at MNHN, Paris)

Scientific classification
- Kingdom: Animalia
- Phylum: Mollusca
- Class: Gastropoda
- Family: Omalogyridae
- Genus: Ammonicera
- Species: A. minortalis

Binomial name
- Ammonicera minortalis Rolán, 1992

= Ammonicera minortalis =

Species of gastropod

Ammonicera minortalis is a species of minute sea snail, a marine gastropod mollusc in the family Omalogyridae.

== Description ==
The diameter of the shell varies between 0.2 mm and 0.4 mm.

This is the smallest living gastropod in the United States. The structure of the shell is very similar to Ammonicera japonica.

== Distribution ==
This marine species occurs off Cuba, Jamaica, the Bahamas and Mexico.
