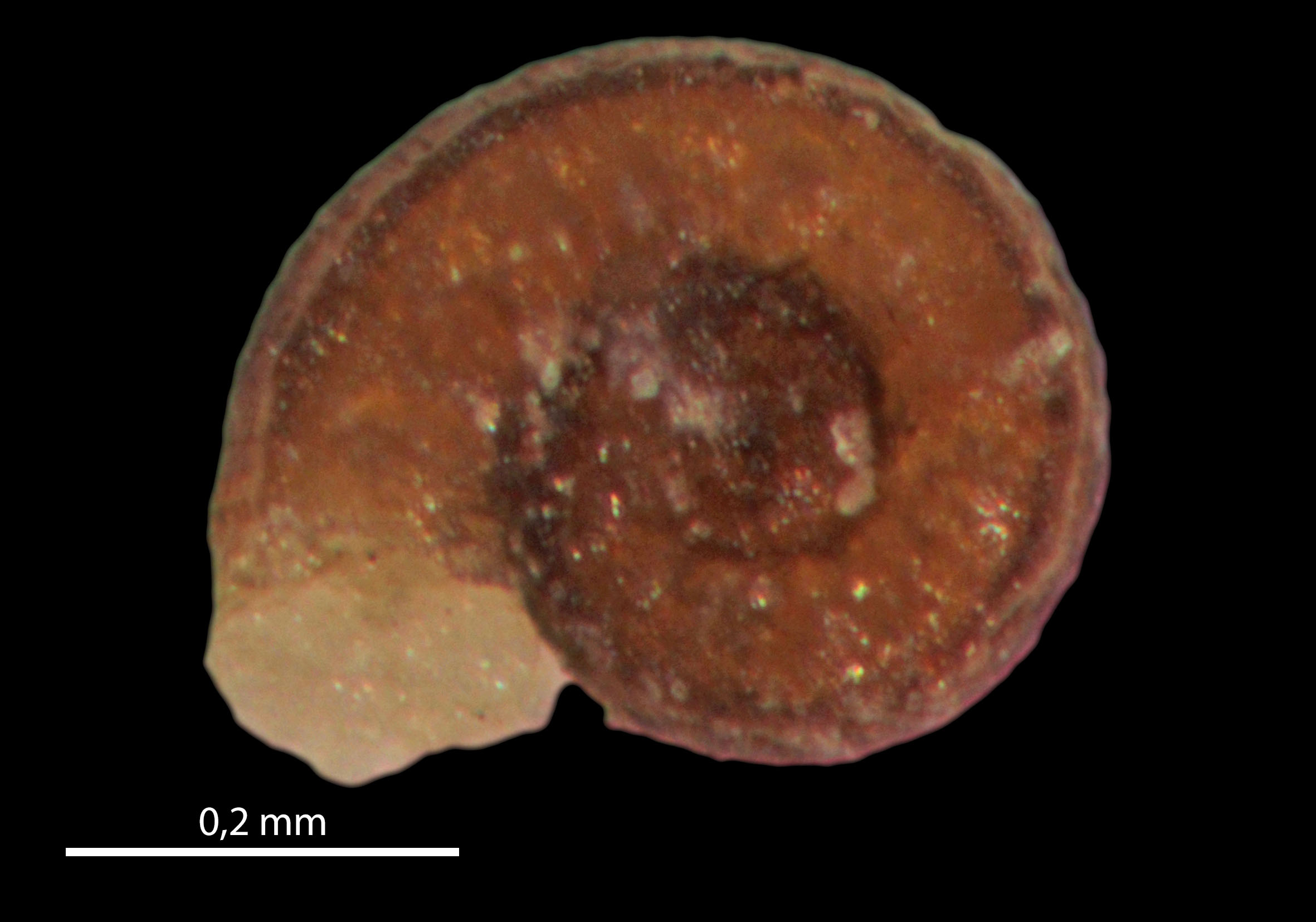
- Shell of Ammonicera sculpturata (paratype at MNHN, Paris)

Scientific classification
- Kingdom: Animalia
- Phylum: Mollusca
- Class: Gastropoda
- Family: Omalogyridae
- Genus: Ammonicera
- Species: A. sculpturata

Binomial name
- Ammonicera sculpturata Rolán, 1992

= Ammonicera sculpturata =

Species of gastropod

Ammonicera sculpturata is a species of minute sea snail, a marine gastropod mollusc in the family Omalogyridae.

== Description ==
The diameter of the shell varies between 0.3 mm and 0.5 mm.

== Distribution ==
This marine species occurs off Cuba, Turks and Caicos Islands, Saint Kitts and Nevis, the Bahamas and Mexico.
