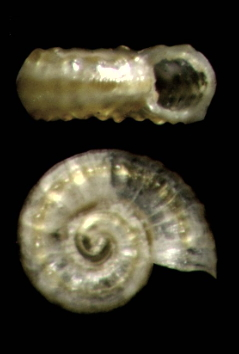
- Shell of Ammonicera consilii (holotype)

Scientific classification
- Kingdom: Animalia
- Phylum: Mollusca
- Class: Gastropoda
- Family: Omalogyridae
- Genus: Ammonicera
- Species: A. consilii

Binomial name
- Ammonicera consilii Antit, Gofas & Taviani, 2024

= Ammonicera consilii =

Species of gastropod

Ammonicera consilii is a species of minute sea snail, a marine gastropod mollusc in the family Omalogyridae.

== Description ==
The size of the shell attains 0.6 mm.

(Original description) A minute, planispiral shell consisting of two whorls. The protoconch has fewer than one whorl, transitioning seamlessly into the teleoconch. The protoconch features a prominent broad ridge occupying approximately one-third of the exposed whorl, adjacent to the suture; this ridge sharply separates from a flat surface surrounding the nucleus. Under high magnification, the ridge appears corrugated, with indistinct spiral-oriented scars.

The teleoconch comprises slightly more than one whorl. The shell's periphery is rounded, with narrow spiral sulci visible only under SEM. Adapical and abapical surfaces are demarcated from the periphery by a sulcus and feature a well-defined, flat nodose spiral cord extending from the ridge of the protoconch. Between this cord and the suture lies a broad depression where the nodules are extended by faint folds that do not reach the suture. The nodose cord is situated at the outer two-thirds of the whorl when viewed from both apical and abapical perspectives, with the spacing between nodes approximately equal to their diameter.

The aperture is simple and rounded. The shell is cream-colored with three distinct brown lines: one at the periphery and one along the nodose cord on each side.

== Distribution ==
This marine species occurs in the Mediterranean Sea in the Strait of Sicily.
