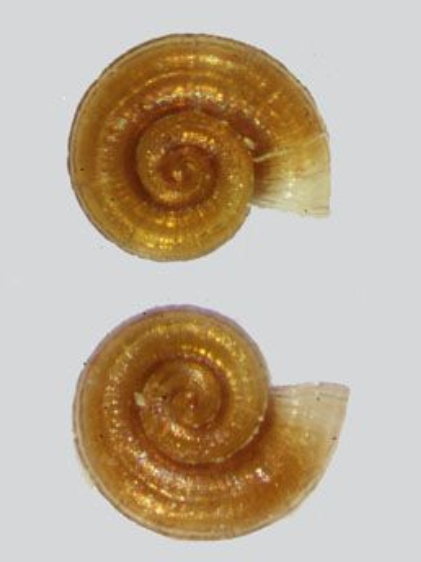
- Shell of Ammonicera lignea (specimen at the Natural History Museum Rotterdam)

Scientific classification
- Kingdom: Animalia
- Phylum: Mollusca
- Class: Gastropoda
- Family: Omalogyridae
- Genus: Ammonicera
- Species: A. lignea

Binomial name
- Ammonicera lignea (Palazzi, 1988)

Synonyms
- Ammonicerina lignea Palazzi, 1988 (original combination

= Ammonicera lignea =

Species of gastropod

Ammonicera lignea is a species of minute sea snail, a marine gastropod mollusc in the family Omalogyridae.

== Description ==
The major diameter of the shell is 0.92 mm.

== Distribution ==
This species occurs off in the Atlantic Ocean off Madeira.
