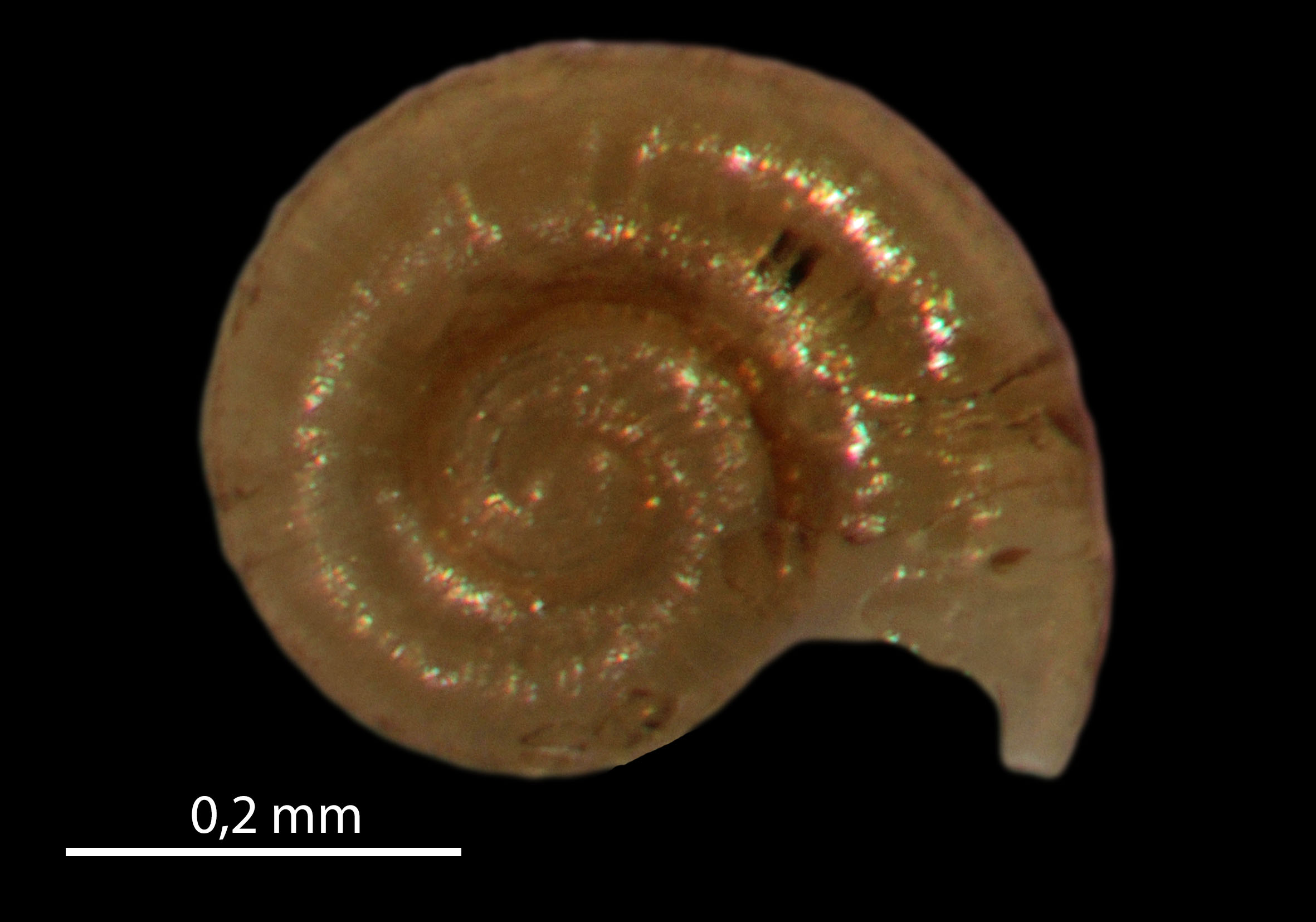
- Shell of Ammonicera plicata (paratype in the MNHN, Paris)

Scientific classification
- Kingdom: Animalia
- Phylum: Mollusca
- Class: Gastropoda
- Family: Omalogyridae
- Genus: Ammonicera
- Species: A. plicata

Binomial name
- Ammonicera plicata Sleurs, 1985

= Ammonicera plicata =

Species of gastropod

Ammonicera plicata is a species of minute sea snail, a marine gastropod mollusc in the family Omalogyridae.

== Distribution ==
This marine species occurs off the Maldives.
