= Ammonicera plana =

Scientific classification
- Kingdom: Animalia
- Phylum: Mollusca
- Class: Gastropoda
- Family: Omalogyridae
- Genus: Ammonicera
- Species: A. plana

Binomial name
- Ammonicera plana Simone, 1997

Species of gastropod

Ammonicera plana is a species of minute sea snail, a marine gastropod mollusc in the family Omalogyridae.

== Distribution ==
This species occurs in the Atlantic Ocean off Brazil.
