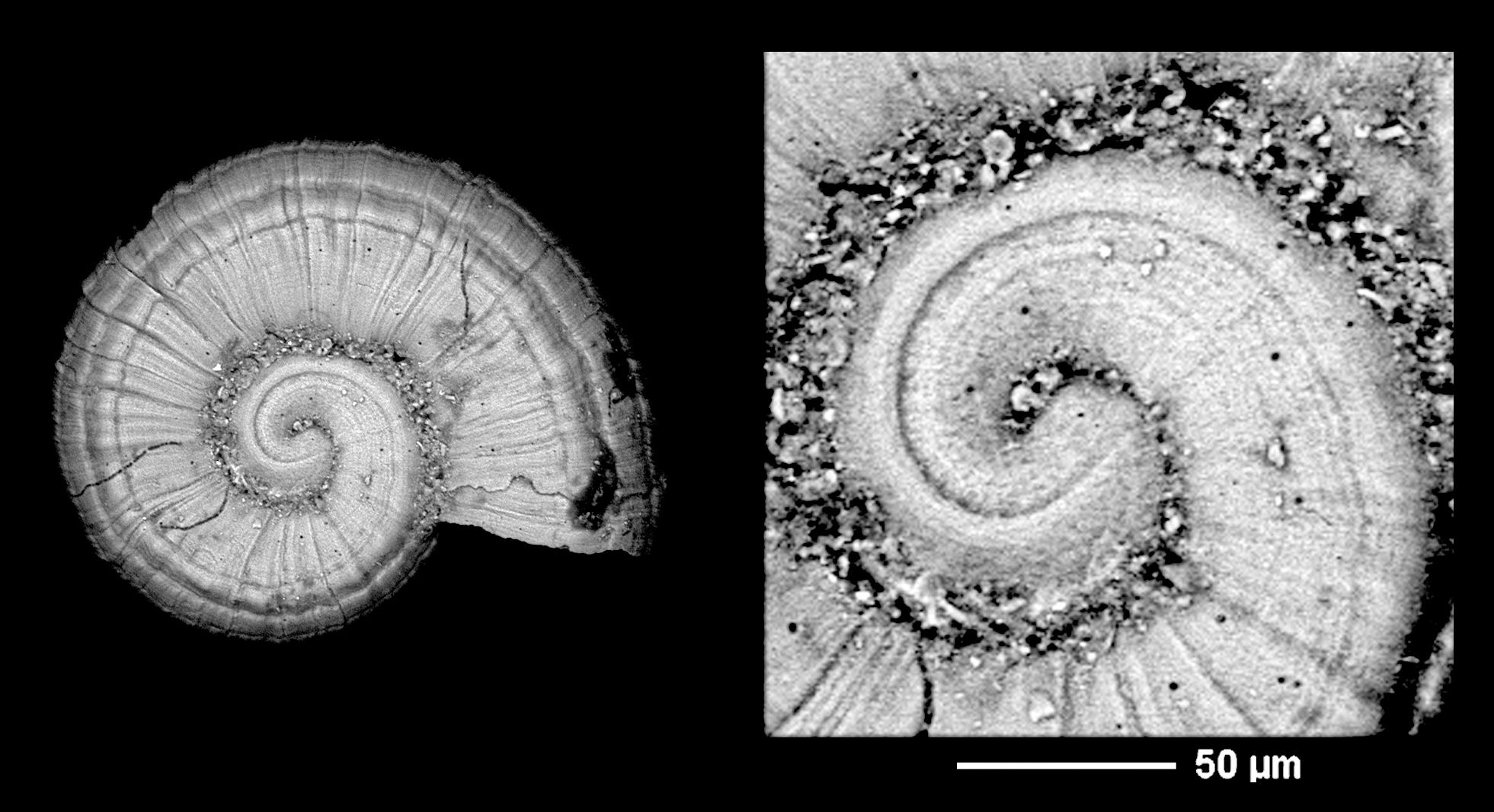
- Shell of Ammonicera tomalba (holotype at MNHN, Paris)

Scientific classification
- Kingdom: Animalia
- Phylum: Mollusca
- Class: Gastropoda
- Family: Omalogyridae
- Genus: Ammonicera
- Species: A. tomalba

Binomial name
- Ammonicera tomalba Rubio & Rolán, 2020

= Ammonicera tomalba =

Species of gastropod

Ammonicera tomalba is a species of minute sea snail, a marine gastropod mollusc in the family Omalogyridae.

== Distribution ==
This marine species occurs in the Atlantic Ocean off São Tomé and Príncipe.
