= Ammonicera aurea =

Scientific classification
- Kingdom: Animalia
- Phylum: Mollusca
- Class: Gastropoda
- Family: Omalogyridae
- Genus: Ammonicera
- Species: A. aurea

Binomial name
- Ammonicera aurea Waki, Rolán, Noseworthy, H.-S. Kang & K.-S. Choi, 2017

Species of gastropod

Ammonicera aurea is a species of minute sea snail, a marine gastropod mollusc in the family Omalogyridae.

== Distribution ==
This marine species occurs off South Korea.
