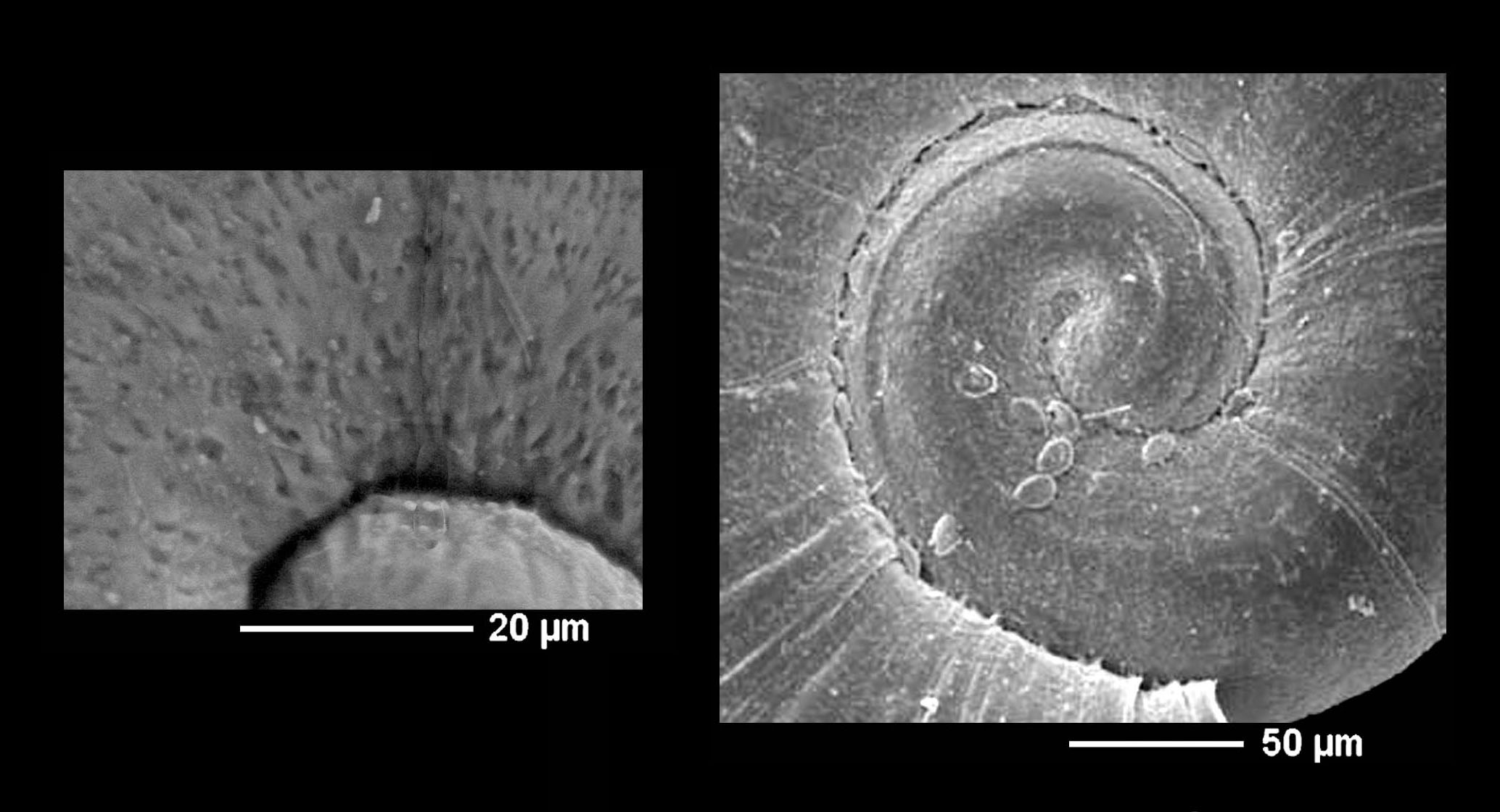
- Shell of Ammonicera galaica (specimen at the Natural History Museum Rotterdam)

Scientific classification
- Kingdom: Animalia
- Phylum: Mollusca
- Class: Gastropoda
- Family: Omalogyridae
- Genus: Ammonicera
- Species: A. galaica

Binomial name
- Ammonicera galaica J. D. Oliver & Rolán, 2015

= Ammonicera galaica =

Species of gastropod

Ammonicera galaica is a species of minute sea snail, a marine gastropod mollusc in the family Omalogyridae.

== Description ==
The diameter of the shell reaches 0.46 mm.

== Distribution ==
This marine species occurs in the Atlantic Ocean off Spain (Galicia: Cape Silleiro).
