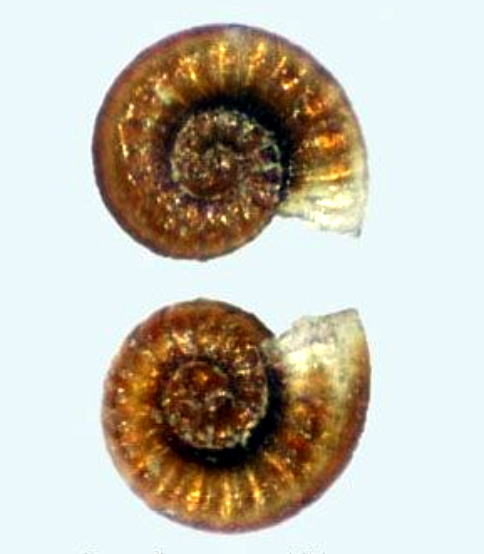
- Shell of Ammonicera superstriata (specimen at the Natural History Museum Rotterdam)

Scientific classification
- Kingdom: Animalia
- Phylum: Mollusca
- Class: Gastropoda
- Family: Omalogyridae
- Genus: Ammonicera
- Species: A. superstriata

Binomial name
- Ammonicera superstriata J. D. Oliver & Rolán, 2015

= Ammonicera superstriata =

Species of gastropod

Ammonicera superstriata is a species of minute sea snail, a marine gastropod mollusc in the family Omalogyridae.

== Description ==
The diameter of the shell reaches 0.62 mm.

== Distribution ==
This marine species occurs in the Mediterranean Sea off Spain (Balearic Islands) and Italy (Reggio Calabria).
