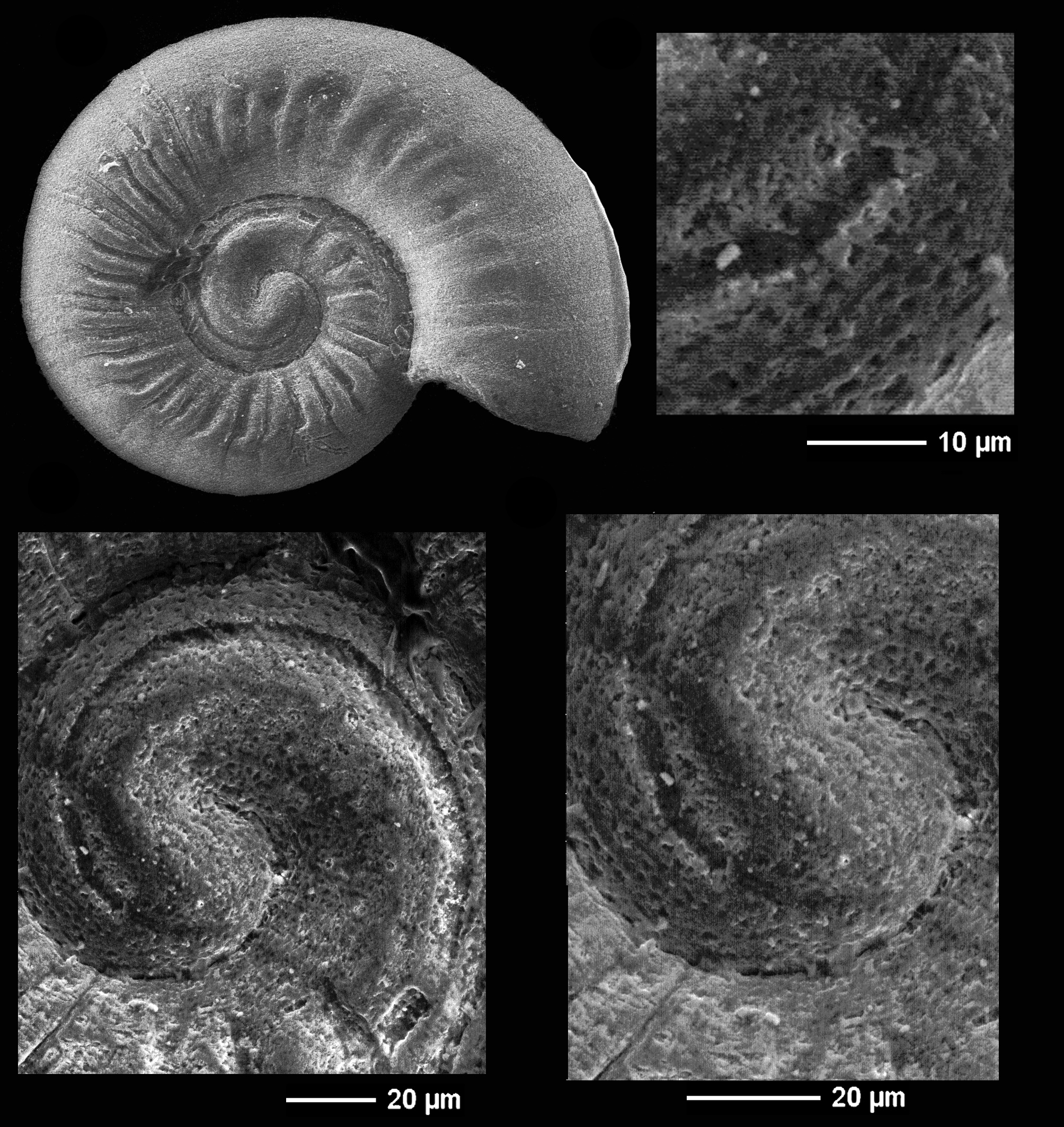
- Shell of Ammonicera pascuensis (holotype at MNHN, Paris)

Scientific classification
- Kingdom: Animalia
- Phylum: Mollusca
- Class: Gastropoda
- Family: Omalogyridae
- Genus: Ammonicera
- Species: A. pascuensis

Binomial name
- Ammonicera pascuensis Rubio & Rolán, 2020

= Ammonicera pascuensis =

Species of gastropod

Ammonicera pascuensis is a species of minute sea snail, a marine gastropod mollusc in the family Omalogyridae.

== Distribution ==
This marine species occurs in the Pacific Ocean off Easter Island.
