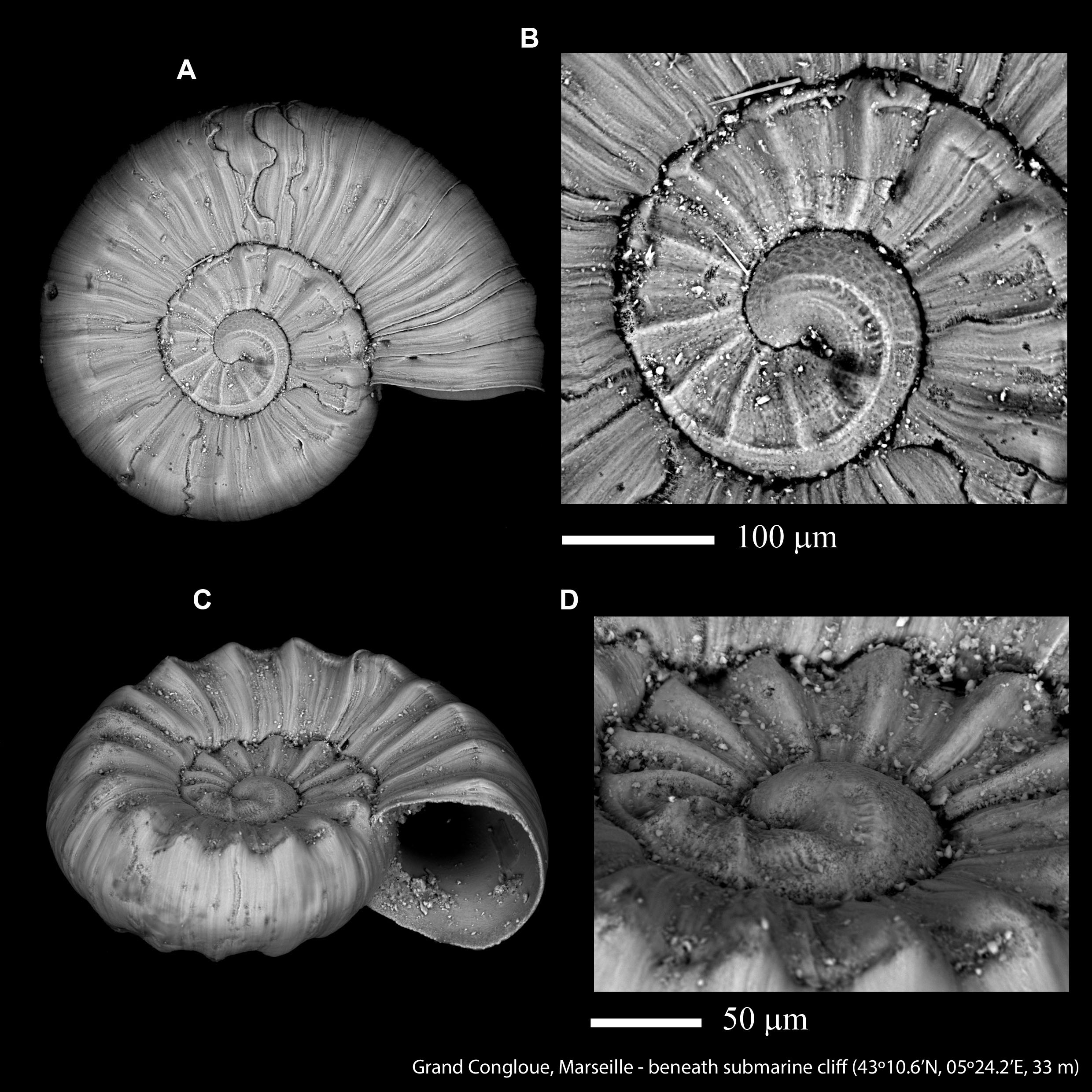
- Shell of Ammonicera columbretensis (paratype at the MNHN, Paris))

Scientific classification
- Kingdom: Animalia
- Phylum: Mollusca
- Class: Gastropoda
- Family: Omalogyridae
- Genus: Ammonicera
- Species: A. columbretensis

Binomial name
- Ammonicera columbretensis J. D. Oliver & Rolán, 2015

= Ammonicera columbretensis =

Species of gastropod

Ammonicera columbretensis is a species of minute sea snail, a marine gastropod mollusc in the family Omalogyridae.

== Description ==
Shell up to 0.85 mm; disc-shaped, 2-3 planar scrolled whorls, at the periphery bluntly keeled; aperture circular, somewhat narrowed by the previous whorl; sculpture: strong radial ribs, above maybe a spiral thread along the tips of the ribs, maybe becoming distinctly spaced from the suture towards the protoconch; shell brown with thin darker spiral bands.

== Distribution ==
This marine species occurs in the Mediterranean Sea off Spain (Columbretes Islands, Balearic Islands), France and Italy (Elba).
