= Ammonicera circumcirra =

Scientific classification
- Kingdom: Animalia
- Phylum: Mollusca
- Class: Gastropoda
- Family: Omalogyridae
- Genus: Ammonicera
- Species: A. circumcirra

Binomial name
- Ammonicera circumcirra Rolán, 1992

Species of gastropod

Ammonicera circumcirra is a species of minute sea snail, a marine gastropod mollusc in the family Omalogyridae.

== Description ==
The diameter of the shell varies between 0.4 mm and 0.6 mm.

== Distribution ==
This marine species occurs off Cuba, Puerto Rico and in the Atlantic Ocean off Brazil.

== Bibliography ==
- Rolán, E. (1992). "The family Omalogyridae G.O. Sars, 1878 (Mollusca, Gastropoda) in Cuba with description of eight new species". Apex. 7: 45.
- Rosenberg, G.; Moretzsohn, F.; García, E. F. (2009). Gastropoda (Mollusca) of the Gulf of Mexico, Pp. 579–699 in: Felder, D.L. and D.K. Camp (eds.), Gulf of Mexico–Origins, Waters, and Biota. College Station, Texas: Texas A&M Press.
