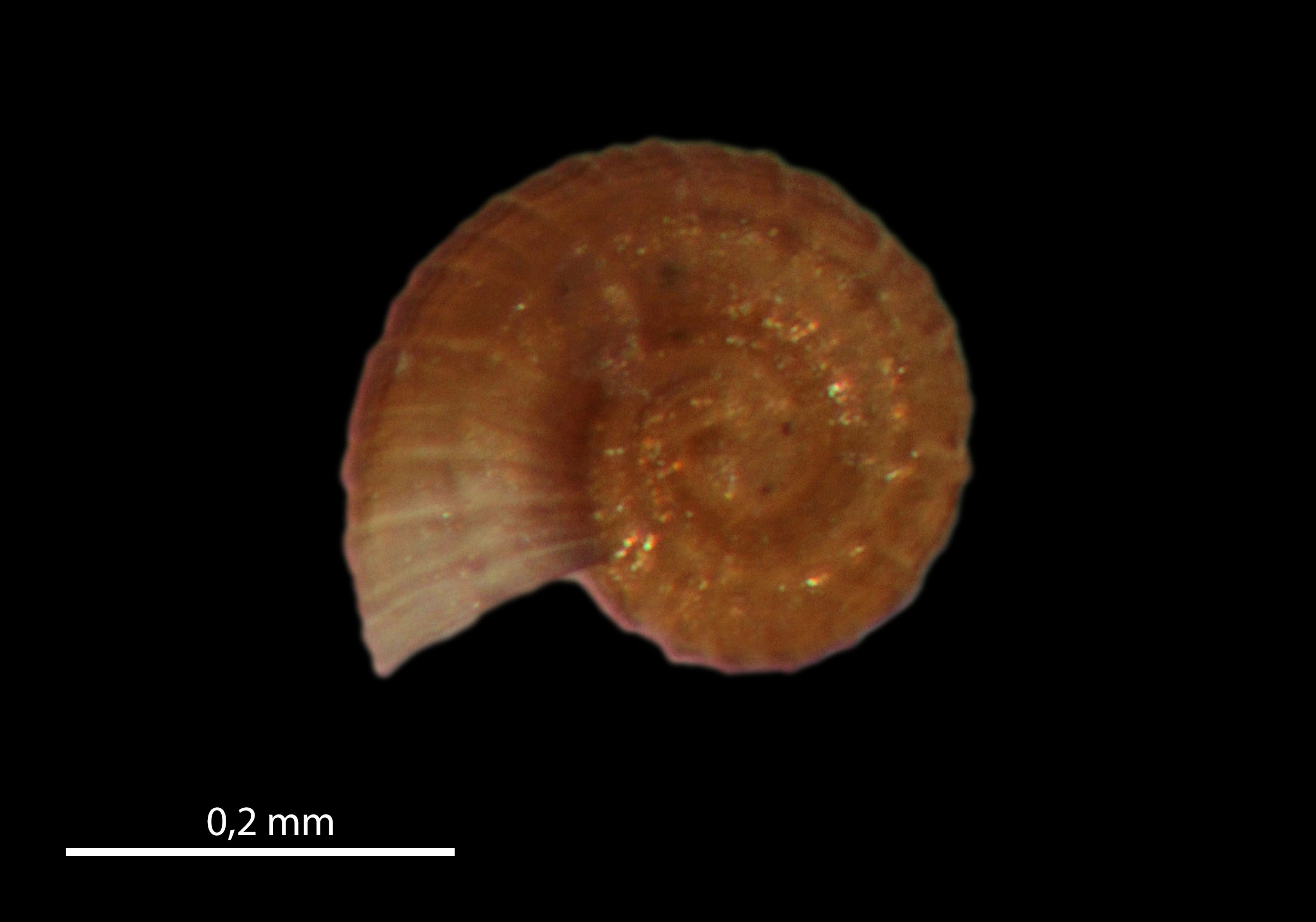
- Shell of Ammonicera tenuicostata (paratype in the MNHN, Paris)

Scientific classification
- Kingdom: Animalia
- Phylum: Mollusca
- Class: Gastropoda
- Family: Omalogyridae
- Genus: Ammonicera
- Species: A. tenuicostata

Binomial name
- Ammonicera tenuicostata Sleurs, 1985

= Ammonicera tenuicostata =

Species of gastropod

Ammonicera tenuicostata is a species of minute sea snail, a marine gastropod mollusc in the family Omalogyridae.

== Distribution ==
This marine species occurs off the Maldives.
