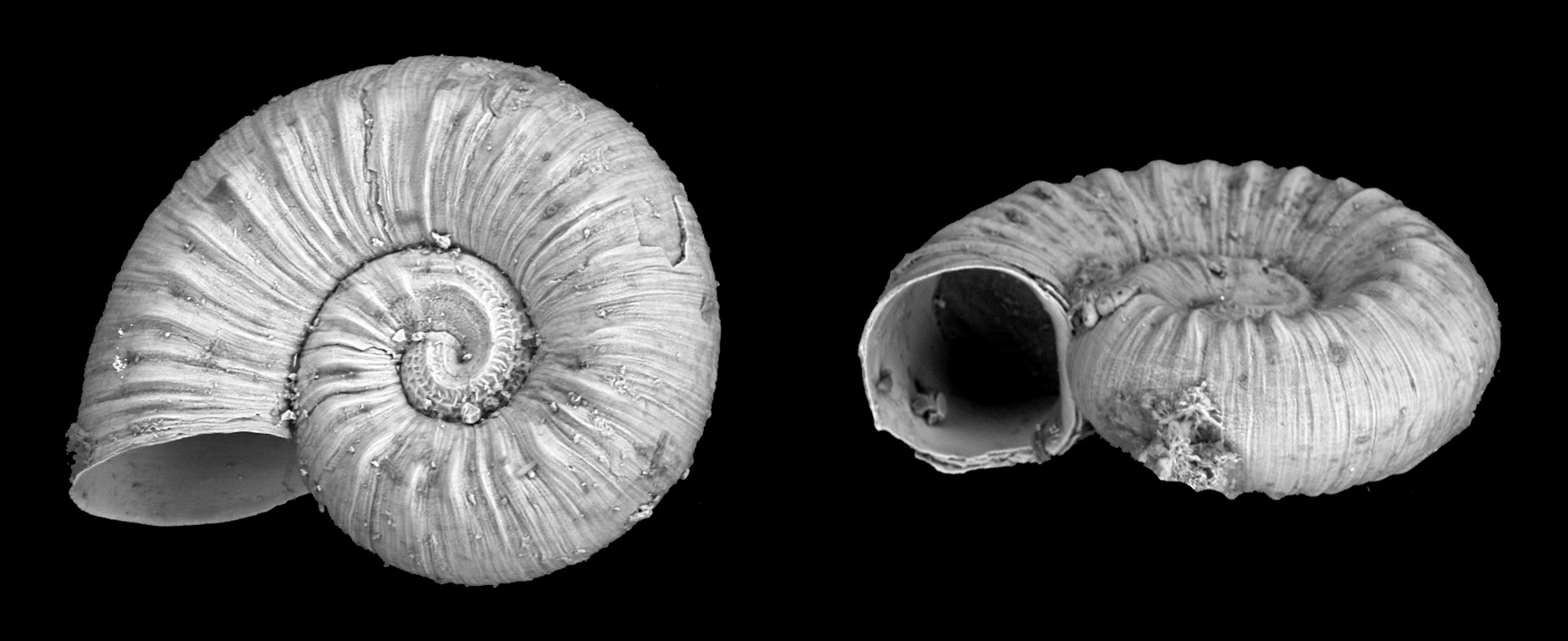
- Shell of Ammonicera caledonica (paratype at MNHN, Paris)

Scientific classification
- Kingdom: Animalia
- Phylum: Mollusca
- Class: Gastropoda
- Family: Omalogyridae
- Genus: Ammonicera
- Species: A. caledonica

Binomial name
- Ammonicera caledonica Rubio & Rolán, 2020

= Ammonicera caledonica =

Species of gastropod

Ammonicera caledonica is a species of minute sea snail, a marine gastropod mollusc in the family Omalogyridae.

== Distribution ==
This marine species occurs off New Caledonia.
