= Ammonicera albanyensis =

Scientific classification
- Kingdom: Animalia
- Phylum: Mollusca
- Class: Gastropoda
- Family: Omalogyridae
- Genus: Ammonicera
- Species: A. albanyensis

Binomial name
- Ammonicera albanyensis Rubio & Rolán, 2020

Species of gastropod

Ammonicera albanyensis is a species of minute sea snail, a marine gastropod mollusc in the family Omalogyridae.

== Distribution ==
This marine species occurs off Western Australia.
