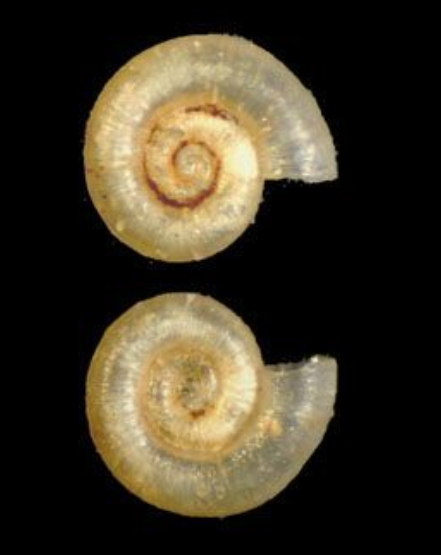
- Shell of Ammonicera rotundata (specimen at the Natural History Museum Rotterdam)

Scientific classification
- Domain: Eukaryota
- Kingdom: Animalia
- Phylum: Mollusca
- Class: Gastropoda
- Family: Omalogyridae
- Genus: Ammonicera
- Species: A. rotundata

Binomial name
- Ammonicera rotundata (Palazzi, 1988)

Synonyms
- Ammonicerina rotundata Palazzi, 1988 (original combination)

= Ammonicera rotundata =

Species of gastropod

Ammonicera rotundata is a species of minute sea snail, a marine gastropod mollusc in the family Omalogyridae.

== Description ==
The size of the shell attains 1 mm.

== Distribution ==
This species occurs in the Atlantic Ocean off Madeira.
