= Ammonicera sucina =

Scientific classification
- Kingdom: Animalia
- Phylum: Mollusca
- Class: Gastropoda
- Family: Omalogyridae
- Genus: Ammonicera
- Species: A. sucina

Binomial name
- Ammonicera sucina (Laseron, 1954)

Synonyms
- Helisalia sucina Laseron, 1954 (original combination)

Species of gastropod

Ammonicera sucina is a species of minute sea snail, a marine gastropod mollusc in the family Omalogyridae.

== Description ==
The major diameter of the shell is 0.70 mm and a minor diameter of 0.60 mm.

== Distribution ==
This species occurs off the coast of North Harbour, Sydney, Australia.
