= Ammonicera chosenica =

Scientific classification
- Kingdom: Animalia
- Phylum: Mollusca
- Class: Gastropoda
- Family: Omalogyridae
- Genus: Ammonicera
- Species: A. chosenica

Binomial name
- Ammonicera chosenica A. V. Chernyshev, 2003

Species of gastropod

Ammonicera chosenica is a species of minute sea snail, a marine gastropod mollusc in the family Omalogyridae.

== Distribution ==
This marine species occurs in the Sea of Japan.
