= Palazzia =

Scientific classification
- Kingdom: Animalia
- Phylum: Mollusca
- Class: Gastropoda
- Subclass: Vetigastropoda
- Family: incertae sedis
- Genus: Palazzia; Waren, 1991

Type species
- Omalogyra ausonia Palazzi, 1988

Genus of gastropods

Palazzia is a genus of sea snails, marine gastropod mollusks, unassigned in the superfamily Seguenzioidea.

== Species ==
Species within the genus Palazzia include:

- Palazzia ausonia (Palazzi, 1988)
- Palazzia nautiliformis (Powell, 1927)
- Palazzia pankakare Absalao, 2009
- Palazzia planorbis (Dall, 1927)
- Palazzia ramosa (Powell, 1940)
