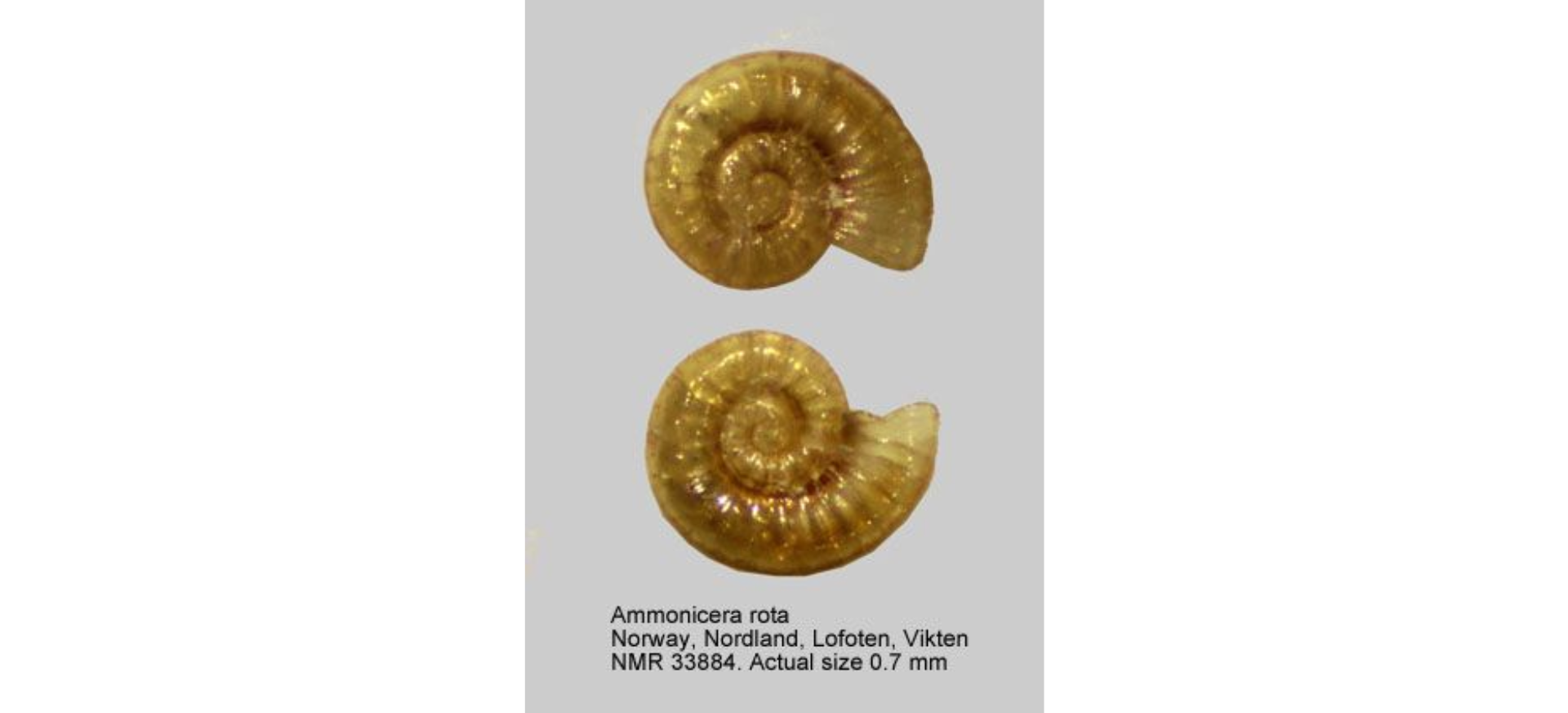
- Shell of Ammonicera rota (specimen at the Natural History Museum Rotterdam)

Scientific classification
- Kingdom: Animalia
- Phylum: Mollusca
- Class: Gastropoda
- Family: Omalogyridae
- Genus: Ammonicera
- Species: A. rota

Binomial name
- Ammonicera rota (Forbes & Hanley, 1850)

Synonyms
- Ammonicerina paucicostata OG Costa, 1861 (dubious synonym); Ammonicerina pulchella OG Costa, 1861; Ammonicerina rota (Forbes & Hanley, 1850); Homalogyra rota (Forbes & Hanley, 1850); Homalogyra rotata Locard, 1886; Omalogyra (Ammonicera) rota (Forbes & Hanley, 1850); Skenea rota Forbes & Hanley, 1850(original combination); Skenea tricarinata W. Webster, 1856 junior subjective synonym

= Ammonicera rota =

Species of gastropod

Ammonicera rota is a species of minute sea snail, a marine gastropod mollusc in the family Omalogyridae.

== Description ==
The size of the shell attains 0.7 mm.

(Original description) The shell is discoid, flattened on both sides but slightly sunken in the center, with a pearly semi-transparent white or very pale wax-like color. Both the upper and lower surfaces are adorned with numerous abruptly projecting rounded ribs. These ribs widen as they radiate from the well-defined sutural line but do not fully extend to the edges of the whorls. The spaces between the ribs are nearly equal in width and may either be smooth or feature a single elevated radiating line. Occasionally, a faint spiral groove appears between the ribs near their termini but does not traverse them.

The shell consists of only 2½ whorls, which are convex, well-defined, and gradually increase in size from a smooth, relatively large apex. The body whorl is not perfectly rounded but appears slightly subangulated above and below, possibly due to the reduced convexity of the periphery.

The aperture, raised slightly above the upper surface of the shell, is small and nearly circular, with only a minor intrusion from the preceding whorl. The animal, dried and not observed in its living state, is wax-colored.

== Distribution ==
This species occurs in the Atlantic Ocean; also off the coastal regions of West Africa; in the Mediterranean Sea.
