= Palazzia ramosa =

Scientific classification
- Kingdom: Animalia
- Phylum: Mollusca
- Class: Gastropoda
- Subclass: Vetigastropoda
- Family: incertae sedis
- Genus: Palazzia
- Species: P. ramosa

Binomial name
- Palazzia ramosa (Powell, 1940)

Synonyms
- Zerotula ramosa Powell, 1940

Species of gastropod

Palazzia ramosa is a species of sea snail, a marine gastropod mollusk, unassigned in the superfamily Seguenzioidea, the turban snails.

== Distribution ==
This marine species occurs off New Zealand.
