= Palazzia pankakare =

Scientific classification
- Kingdom: Animalia
- Phylum: Mollusca
- Class: Gastropoda
- Subclass: Vetigastropoda
- Family: incertae sedis
- Genus: Palazzia
- Species: P. pankakare

Binomial name
- Palazzia pankakare Absalao, 2009

Species of gastropod

Palazzia pankakare is a species of sea snail, a marine gastropod mollusk, unassigned in the superfamily Seguenzioidea.
