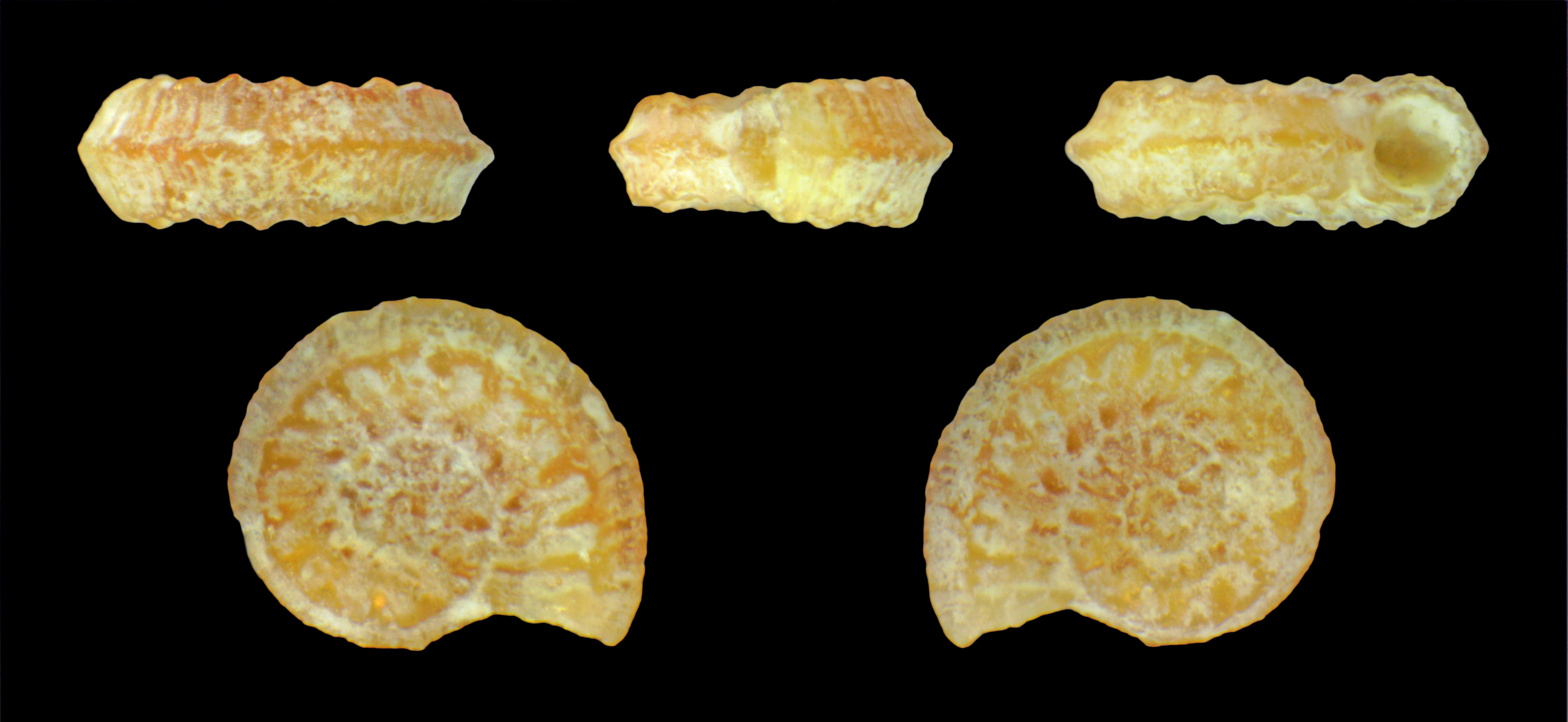
- Ammonicera binodosa

Scientific classification
- Kingdom: Animalia
- Phylum: Mollusca
- Class: Gastropoda
- Infraclass: "Lower Heterobranchia"
- Superfamily: Omalogyroidea
- Family: Omalogyridae
- Genus: Ammonicera; Vayssière, 1893

Type species
- Omalogyra fischeriana Monterosato, 1869

Species
- See text

Synonyms
- Omalogyra (Ammonicera) Vayssière, 1893

= Ammonicera =

Genus of gastropods

Ammonicera is a genus of minute sea snails, marine gastropod molluscs or micromollusks in the family Omalogyridae. They are found in various locations such as the Eastern Pacific coasts of the United States and Mexico, Japan, and the Mediterranean.

This genus comprises the smallest gastropods known, featuring discoid, planispiral shells that typically measure in the adult state 1 mm or even less in size. The protoconch is characterized by distinct ridges and grooves. The teleoconch typically displays prominent sculpture, though it is occasionally weak. The aperture ranges from rounded to subquadrate.

The diet of the Ammonicera is not confirmed, however, based on the diets of other Omalogyridae, it is assumed to feed on several algal species in its habitat.

== Species ==
Species within the genus Ammonicera include:

- Ammonicera albanyensis Rubio & Rolán, 2020
- Ammonicera albospeciosa Rolán, 1992
- Ammonicera andresi J. D. Oliver & Rolán, 2015
- Ammonicera angulata Sleurs, 1985
- Ammonicera arrondoi J. D. Oliver & Rolán, 2015
- Ammonicera aurea Waki, Rolán, Noseworthy, H.-S. Kang & K.-S. Choi, 2017
- Ammonicera binodosa Sleurs, 1985
- Ammonicera burnayi Rolán, 1991
- Ammonicera caledonica Rubio & Rolán, 2020
- Ammonicera chosenica Chernyshev, 2003
- Ammonicera circumcirra Rolán, 1992
- Ammonicera columbretensis J. D. Oliver & Rolán, 2015
- Ammonicera consilii Antit, Gofas & Taviani, 2024
- Ammonicera croata Rubio & Rolán, 2020
- † Ammonicera eocaenica (Allix, 1923)
- Ammonicera extracarinacostata Sleurs, 1985
- Ammonicera familiaris Rolán, 1992
- Ammonicera fischeriana (Monterosato, 1869)
- Ammonicera galaica J. D. Oliver & Rolán, 2015
- Ammonicera gonzalezi Rolán & Rubio, 2017
- Ammonicera japonica Habe, 1972
- Ammonicera lignea (Palazzi, 1988)
- Ammonicera lineofuscata Rolán, 1992
- Ammonicera mcleani Sartori & Bieler, 2014
- Ammonicera mexicana Sartori & Bieler, 2014
- Ammonicera minortalis Rolán, 1992
- Ammonicera multistriata Rolán, 1991
- Ammonicera nodicarinata (Sleurs, 1985)
- Ammonicera nodulosa J. D. Oliver & Rolán, 2015
- Ammonicera nolai Rolán, 1991
- Ammonicera oteroi Rolán, 1991
- Ammonicera pascuensis Rubio & Rolán, 2020
- Ammonicera plana Simone, 1997
- Ammonicera plicata Sleurs, 1985
- Ammonicera robusta Rolán, 1991
- Ammonicera rota (Forbes & Hanley, 1850)
- Ammonicera rotundata (Palazzi, 1988)
- Ammonicera san Rolán & Peñas, 2009
- Ammonicera sculpturata Rolán, 1992
- Ammonicera shornikovi Chernyshev, 2003
- Ammonicera sleursi Sartori & Bieler, 2014
- Ammonicera sucina (Laseron, 1954)
- Ammonicera superstriata J. D. Oliver & Rolán, 2015
- Ammonicera tahitiensis Rubio, Rolán & Letourneux, 2020
- Ammonicera tenuicostata Sleurs, 1985
- Ammonicera tomalba Rubio & Rolán, 2020
- Ammonicera tomensis Rubio & Rolán, 2020
- Ammonicera vangoethemi (Sleurs, 1985)
- Ammonicera verdensis Rolán, 1991
- Ammonicera vladivostokensis Chernyshev, 2003

== See also ==
- Smallest organisms
