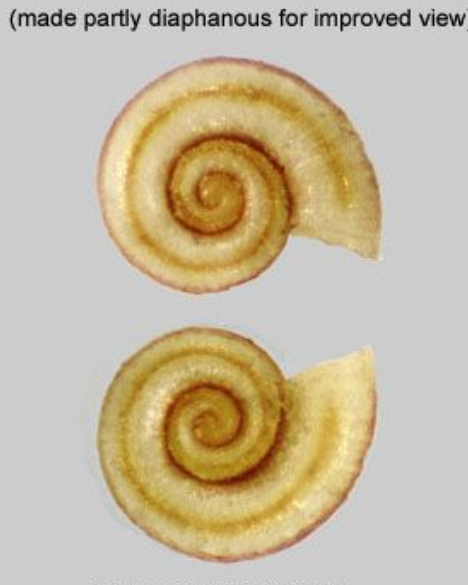
- Shell of Ammonicera fischeriana (specimen at the Natural History Museum Rotterdam)

Scientific classification
- Kingdom: Animalia
- Phylum: Mollusca
- Class: Gastropoda
- Family: Omalogyridae
- Genus: Ammonicera
- Species: A. fischeriana

Binomial name
- Ammonicera fischeriana (Monterosato, 1869)

Synonyms
- Homalogyra fischeriana Monterosato, 1869 · (original combination)

= Ammonicera fischeriana =

Species of gastropod

Ammonicera fischeriana is a species of minute sea snail, a marine gastropod mollusc in the family Omalogyridae.

== Description ==
The length of the shell attains 0.8 mm.

(Original description in French) A very small, discoidal, planorbiform shell, coiled in a single plane, symmetrical, and transparent. It is decorated with fine growth striations visible only under magnification.

The shell exhibits a whitish coloration accented by three equidistant reddish-brown bands: one near the top, one in the middle, and one at the bottom. It has four regularly coiled whorls, with the body whorl rounded. The aperture is circular, with a simple peristome that is neither reflected nor thickened.

== Distribution ==
This marine species occurs in the Mediterranean Sea off the Balearic Islands, France, Italy, Greece, Tunisia, Turkey.
