= Palazzia nautiliformis =

Scientific classification
- Kingdom: Animalia
- Phylum: Mollusca
- Class: Gastropoda
- Subclass: Vetigastropoda
- Family: incertae sedis
- Genus: Palazzia
- Species: P. nautiliformis

Binomial name
- Palazzia nautiliformis (Powell, 1927)

Species of gastropod

Palazzia nautiliformis is a species of sea snail, a marine gastropod mollusk, unassigned in the superfamily Seguenzioidea.

== Distribution ==
This marine species occurs off New Zealand.
