= Palazzia planorbis =

Scientific classification
- Kingdom: Animalia
- Phylum: Mollusca
- Class: Gastropoda
- Subclass: Vetigastropoda
- Family: incertae sedis
- Genus: Palazzia
- Species: P. planorbis

Binomial name
- Palazzia planorbis (Dall, 1927)

Synonyms
- Lippistes planorbis Dall 1927 (original combination)

Species of gastropod

Palazzia planorbis is a species of sea snail, a marine gastropod mollusk, unassigned in the superfamily Seguenzioidea.

== Description ==
The size of the shell varies between 0.8 mm and 2.2 mm.

== Distribution ==
This species occurs in the Atlantic Ocean off Georgia, United States down to Northern Brazil off the Rockall Trough.
