= Palazzia ausonia =

Scientific classification
- Kingdom: Animalia
- Phylum: Mollusca
- Class: Gastropoda
- Subclass: Vetigastropoda
- Family: incertae sedis
- Genus: Palazzia
- Species: P. ausonia

Binomial name
- Palazzia ausonia (Palazzi, 1988)

Synonyms
- Omalogyra ausonia Palazzi 1988 (original combination)

Species of gastropod

Palazzia ausonia is a species of sea snail, a marine gastropod mollusk, unassigned in the superfamily Seguenzioidea.

== Description ==
The shell grows to a height of 0.7 mm.

== Distribution ==
This bathyal species occurs in the Mediterranean Sea; in the Atlantic Ocean off the Rockall Trough, Iceland, and Western Norway.
