= Ammonicera vangoethemi =

Scientific classification
- Kingdom: Animalia
- Phylum: Mollusca
- Class: Gastropoda
- Family: Omalogyridae
- Genus: Ammonicera
- Species: A. vangoethemi

Binomial name
- Ammonicera vangoethemi (Sleurs, 1985)

Synonyms
- Omalogyra vangoethemi Sleurs, 1985 (original combination)

Species of gastropod

Ammonicera vangoethemi is a species of minute sea snail, a marine gastropod mollusc in the family Omalogyridae.

== Distribution ==
This marine species occurs off Papua New Guinea.
