= Ammonicera nodicarinata =

Scientific classification
- Kingdom: Animalia
- Phylum: Mollusca
- Class: Gastropoda
- Family: Omalogyridae
- Genus: Ammonicera
- Species: A. nodicarinata

Binomial name
- Ammonicera nodicarinata (Sleurs, 1985)

Synonyms
- Omalogyra nodicarinata Sleurs, 1985 (original combination)

Species of gastropod

Ammonicera nodicarinata is a species of minute sea snail, a marine gastropod mollusc in the family Omalogyridae.

== Distribution ==
This marine species occurs off Papua New Guinea; also off Réunion.
