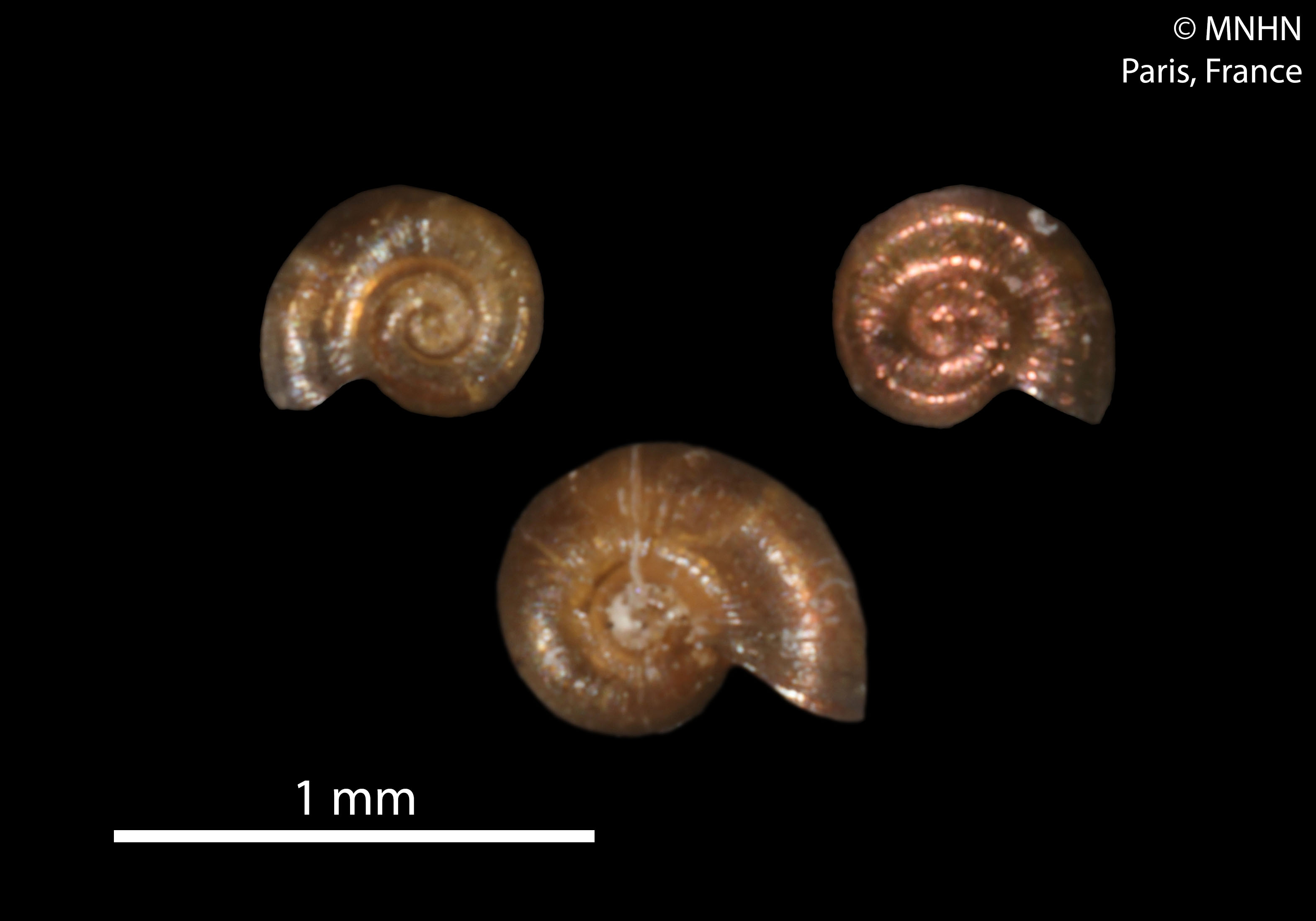
- Retrotortina damara

Scientific classification
- Kingdom: Animalia
- Phylum: Mollusca
- Class: Gastropoda
- Subclass: Heterobranchia
- Infraclass: "Lower Heterobranchia"
- Superfamily: Omalogyroidea; G.O. Sars, 1878

Families
- See text

= Omalogyroidea =

Superfamily of gastropods

Omalogyroidea is a superfamily of minute sea snails, marine gastropod mollusks or micromollusks in the informal group Lower Heterobranchia.

== Families ==
There are two families within the superfamily Omalogyroidea; one of them is composed entirely of extinct species:

- Family Omalogyridae
- † Family Stuoraxidae
