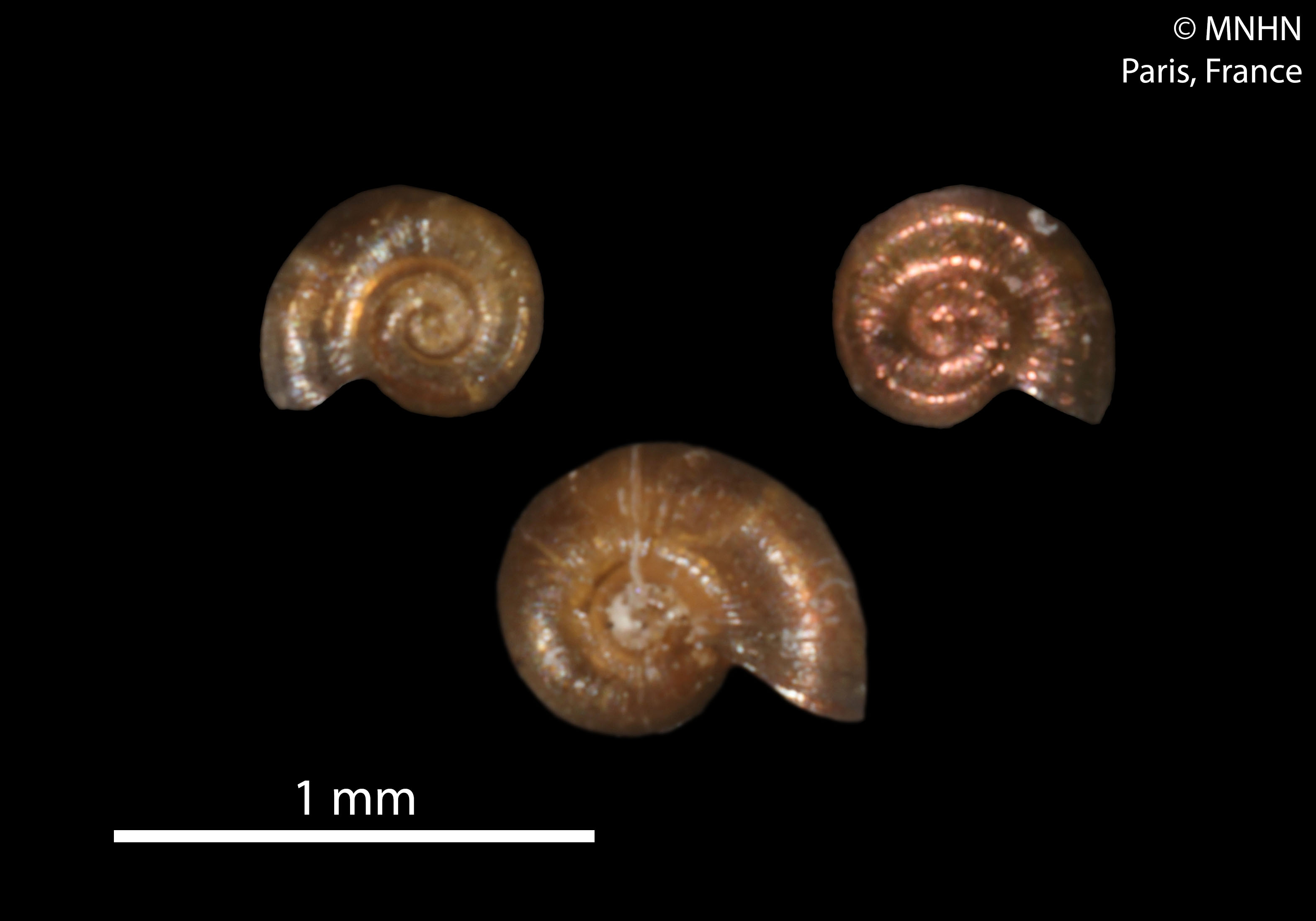
- Shell of Retrotortina damara

Scientific classification
- Kingdom: Animalia
- Phylum: Mollusca
- Class: Gastropoda
- Subclass: Heterobranchia
- Infraclass: "Lower Heterobranchia"
- Superfamily: Omalogyroidea
- Family: Omalogyridae; G.O. Sars, 1878

Genera
- See text

= Omalogyridae =

Family of gastropods

Omalogyridae is a family of minute and microscopic sea snails, marine gastropod molluscs in the informal group Lower Heterobranchia. Omalogyrids are micromolluscs, among the smallest known, with adult shells usually smaller than 1 millimeter in diameter.

This family is poorly known and is tentatively placed in the unresolved infraclass "Lower Heterobranchia". Studies of this group are sketchy and miss or omit the basic information about taxonomy or distribution. They are globally distributed in shallow marine environments, where they feed on algae.

== Description ==
Omalogyrids are among the smallest gastropods, with adult shells usually less than 1 millimeter in diameter. The omalogyrid Ammonicera minortalis is the smallest gastropod in the United States, with a shell 0.34–0.46 mm in diameter, while Retrotortina fuscata is the smallest gastropod in Europe, with a shell 0.50–0.75 mm in diameter. The shells of Ammonicera and Omalogyra are more or less planispiral, giving them an appearance similar to miniature ammonite shells, while the shell of Retrotortina is hyperstrophic. Ammonicera possess a pair of distinct tentacles, while in Retrotortina and Omalogyra the tentacles are replaced by a pair of flat, semicircular lobes. The eyes are at the bases of the tentacles or lobes. There is considerable variation in the anatomy of the radula in omalogyrids.

== Genera ==
Genera within the family Omalogyridae include:

- Ammonicera Vayssiére, 1893
- Omalogyra Jeffreys, 1867
- Retrotortina Chaster, 1896
- † Schobertinella Nützel & Gründel, 2015

Genera brought into synonymy

- Ammonicerina O.G. Costa, 1861: synonym of Omalogyra Jeffreys, 1859
- Helisalia Laseron, 1954: synonym of Omalogyra Jeffreys, 1859
- Homalogyra Jeffreys, 1867: synonym of Omalogyra Jeffreys, 1859
