= 2023 in paleomalacology =

This list of fossil molluscs described in 2023 is a list of new taxa of fossil molluscs that were described during the year 2023, as well as other significant discoveries and events related to molluscan paleontology that occurred in 2023.

== Ammonites ==
Name	Novelty	Status	Authors	Age	Type locality	Location	Notes	Images
Acutimitoceras paracutum	Sp. nov	Valid	Korn & Weyer	Carboniferous (Tournaisian)	Hangenberg Limestone	Germany	A member of the family Prionoceratidae belonging to the subfamily Acutimitoceratinae.	
Acutimitoceras ucatum	Sp. nov	Valid	Korn & Weyer	Carboniferous (Tournaisian)	Hangenberg Limestone	Germany	A member of the family Prionoceratidae belonging to the subfamily Acutimitoceratinae.	
Ammonellipsites infirmus	Sp. nov	Valid	Korn in Zohara Malti et al.	Carboniferous (Tournaisian)	Hassi Sguilma Formation	Algeria		
Arpavoniceras	Gen. et sp. et comb. nov		Frau & Fuhr	Early Cretaceous (Hauterivian)		France; United Kingdom	A member of the family Neocomitidae. The type species is A. buloti; genus also includes "Shasticrioceras" anglicum Doyle (1963).	
Asteroceras dommerguesi	Sp. nov	Valid	Zaitsev & Ippolitov	Early Jurassic (Sinemurian)		Crimea		
Aulatornoceras beyrichi	Sp. nov	Valid	Söte & Becker	Devonian (Frasnian)	Büdesheim Formation	Germany	A member of the family Tornoceratidae. Announced in 2022; the final article version was published in 2023.	
Australopseudothurmannia	Gen. et sp. nov		Marin, Aguirre-Urreta & Rawson	Early Cretaceous (Hauterivian)		Argentina	Genus includes new species A. flexuosa.	
Becanites rowanensis	Sp. nov	Valid	Work & Mason	Carboniferous (Tournaisian)	Borden Formation	United States (Kentucky)		
Bollandoceras antecedens	Sp. nov	Valid	Korn in Zohara Malti et al.	Carboniferous (Tournaisian)	Hassi Sguilma Formation	Algeria		
Buedesheimites	Gen. et sp. nov	Valid	Söte & Becker	Devonian (Frasnian)	Büdesheim Formation	Germany	A member of the family Tornoceratidae. Genus includes new species B. housei. Announced in 2022; the final article version was published in 2023.	
Corbinites	Gen. et comb. nov	Valid	Poulton	Late Jurassic		Canada	A member of the family Ataxioceratidae belonging to the subfamily Lithacoceratinae. The type species is "Titanites" occidentalis Frebold (1957).	
Costiphylloceras limayense	Sp. nov	Valid	Joly, Parent & Garrido	Middle Jurassic (Aalenian)	Los Molles Formation	Argentina	A member of the family Phylloceratidae.	
Crassotornoceras tenue	Sp. nov	Valid	Söte & Becker	Devonian (Frasnian)	Büdesheim Formation	Germany	A member of the family Tornoceratidae. Announced in 2022; the final article version was published in 2023.	
Cryptomorphiceras	Gen. et comb. et 2 sp. nov	Valid	Marchesi, Balini & Jenks	Late Triassic (Carnian)		United States (Nevada)	A member of Trachyceratinae. The type species is C. compressum (Johnston, 1941); genus also includes new species C. crassum, and C. levicostatum. Announced in 2022; the final article version was published in 2023.	
Djanaliparkinsonia egori	Sp. nov	Valid	Mitta	Middle Jurassic (Bajocian)		Russia (Karachay-Cherkessia)	A member of the family Stephanoceratidae.	
Emileites christophi	Sp. nov	Valid	Dietze & Hostettler	Middle Jurassic	Passwang Formation	Switzerland		
Eocanites delicatus	Sp. nov	Valid	Korn & Weyer	Carboniferous (Tournaisian)	Hangenberg Limestone	Germany	A member of the family Prolecanitidae belonging to the subfamily Prolecanitinae.	
Gattendorfia bella	Sp. nov	Valid	Korn & Weyer	Carboniferous (Tournaisian)	Hangenberg Limestone	Germany	A member of the family Gattendorfiidae.	
Gattendorfia corpulenta	Sp. nov	Valid	Korn & Weyer	Carboniferous (Tournaisian)	Hangenberg Limestone	Germany	A member of the family Gattendorfiidae.	
Gattendorfia immodica	Sp. nov	Valid	Korn & Weyer	Carboniferous (Tournaisian)	Hangenberg Limestone	Germany	A member of the family Gattendorfiidae.	
Gattendorfia rhenana	Sp. nov	Valid	Korn & Weyer	Carboniferous (Tournaisian)	Hangenberg Limestone	Germany	A member of the family Gattendorfiidae.	
Gattendorfia schmidti	Sp. nov	Valid	Korn & Weyer	Carboniferous (Tournaisian)	Hangenberg Limestone	Germany	A member of the family Gattendorfiidae.	
Gattendorfia valdevoluta	Sp. nov	Valid	Korn & Weyer	Carboniferous (Tournaisian)	Hangenberg Limestone	Germany	A member of the family Gattendorfiidae.	
Hammatocyclus rugosus	Sp. nov	Valid	Korn in Zohara Malti et al.	Carboniferous (Tournaisian)	Hassi Sguilma Formation	Algeria		
Hasselbachia erronea	Sp. nov	Valid	Korn & Weyer	Carboniferous (Tournaisian)	Hangenberg Limestone	Germany	A member of the family Gattendorfiidae belonging to the subfamily Gattendorfiinae.	
Idahocolumbites phatthalungensis	Sp. nov.	Valid	Thongterm & Shigeta in Thongterm et al.	Triassic (Spathian)	Chaiburi formation	Thailand	A member of Ceratitida belonging to the family Columbitidae.	
Imitoceras initium	Sp. nov	Valid	Korn & Weyer	Carboniferous (Tournaisian)	Hangenberg Limestone	Germany	A member of the family Prionoceratidae belonging to the subfamily Imitoceratinae.	
Kazakhstania kana	Sp. nov	Valid	Korn & Weyer	Carboniferous		Morocco	A member of the family Gattendorfiidae belonging to the subfamily Gattendorfiinae.	
Knemiceras lanceolatum	Sp. nov		Latil & Jaillard	Early Cretaceous		Tunisia		
Knemiceras multicostatum	Sp. nov		Latil & Jaillard	Early Cretaceous		Tunisia		
Knemiceras sagetae	Sp. nov		Latil & Jaillard	Early Cretaceous		Tunisia		
Knemiceras tunisiense	Sp. nov		Latil & Jaillard	Early Cretaceous		Tunisia		
Kornia acia	Sp. nov	Valid	Korn & Weyer	Carboniferous (Tournaisian)	Hangenberg Limestone	Germany	A member of the family Prionoceratidae belonging to the subfamily Prionoceratinae.	
Kornia fibula	Sp. nov	Valid	Korn & Weyer	Carboniferous (Tournaisian)	Hangenberg Limestone	Germany	A member of the family Prionoceratidae belonging to the subfamily Prionoceratinae.	
Lazariniceras heterostylia	Sp. nov		Bert et al.	Early Cretaceous (Barremian)		France		
Lazariniceras lhaumeti	Sp. nov		Bert et al.	Early Cretaceous (Barremian)		France		
Linguatornoceras acutilobatum	Sp. nov	Valid	Söte & Becker	Devonian (Frasnian)	Büdesheim Formation	Germany	A member of the family Tornoceratidae. Announced in 2022; the final article version was published in 2023.	
Linguatornoceras sandense	Sp. nov	Valid	Söte & Becker	Devonian (Frasnian)	Büdesheim Formation	Germany	A member of the family Tornoceratidae. Announced in 2022; the final article version was published in 2023.	
Lobosphinctes dzhissaensis	Sp. nov	Valid	Mitta in Mitta & Sherstyukov	Middle Jurassic		Russia	A member of the family Perisphinctidae.	
Merocanites parvevolutus	Sp. nov	Valid	Korn in Zohara Malti et al.	Carboniferous (Tournaisian)	Hassi Sguilma Formation	Algeria		
Metengonoceras foleyi	Sp. nov	Valid	May & Lucas	Late Cretaceous (Cenomanian)	Dakota Sandstone	United States (New Mexico)	A member of the family Engonoceratidae.	
Mimimitoceras mina	Sp. nov	Valid	Korn & Weyer	Carboniferous		Morocco	A member of the family Prionoceratidae belonging to the subfamily Prionoceratinae.	
Mimimitoceras perditum	Sp. nov	Valid	Korn & Weyer	Carboniferous (Tournaisian)	Hangenberg Limestone	Germany	A member of the family Prionoceratidae belonging to the subfamily Prionoceratinae.	
Mosirites	Gen. et 2 sp. nov		Shigeta, Nishimura & Izukura	Cretaceous (Albian to Cenomanian)		Japan	A heteromorph ammonoid, possibly derived from Anisoceras. Genus includes M. serpentiformis and M. mirabilis.	
Muensteroceras rectilineum	Sp. nov	Valid	Korn in Zohara Malti et al.	Carboniferous (Tournaisian)	Hassi Sguilma Formation	Algeria		
Muensteroceras triplettense	Sp. nov	Valid	Work & Mason	Carboniferous (Tournaisian)	Borden Formation	United States (Kentucky)		
Nomismocanites	Gen. et sp. nov	Valid	Korn & Weyer	Carboniferous (Tournaisian)	Hangenberg Limestone	Germany	A member of the family Prolecanitidae belonging to the subfamily Prolecanitinae. The type species is N. raritas.	
Paprothites beckeri	Sp. nov	Valid	Korn & Weyer	Carboniferous (Tournaisian)	Hangenberg Limestone	Germany	A member of the family Gattendorfiidae belonging to the subfamily Pseudarietitinae.	
Paprothites kullmanni	Sp. nov	Valid	Korn & Weyer	Carboniferous (Tournaisian)	Hangenberg Limestone	Germany	A member of the family Gattendorfiidae belonging to the subfamily Pseudarietitinae.	
Paraemericiceras	Gen. et sp. nov		Marin, Aguirre-Urreta & Rawson	Early Cretaceous (Hauterivian)	Agrio Formation	Argentina	Genus includes new species P. argentinense.	
Paraspiticeras bituberculatum	Sp. nov		Marin, Aguirre-Urreta & Rawson	Early Cretaceous (Hauterivian)	Agrio Formation	Argentina		
Parengonoceras chottensis	Sp. nov		Latil & Jaillard	Early Cretaceous		Tunisia		
Planisphinctes pirkli	Sp. nov	Valid	Mitta in Mitta & Sherstyukov	Middle Jurassic		Russia	A member of the family Perisphinctidae.	
Plesechioceras rochai	Sp. nov	Valid	Vitón et al.	Early Jurassic (Sinemurian)		Portugal		
Proplacenticeras alabushevi	Nom. nov		Latil, Murphy & Rodda	Cretaceous (Albian-Cenomanian)		Russia	The fossil material was originally described as Rapidoplacenticeras sutherlandbrowni (McLearn, 1972) by Alabushev (1988).	
Pseudhimalayites carchelejensis	Sp. nov	Valid	Parent et al.	Late Jurassic (Tithonian)		Spain	A member of the family Aspidoceratidae.	
Roberticeras	Gen. et comb. nov	Valid	Latil, Murphy & Rodda	Cretaceous		France; Madagascar; Switzerland; Tunisia; United Kingdom	A member of the family Desmoceratidae. The type species is "Ammonites" dupinianus d'Orbigny (1841); genus also includes other species which were formerly assigned to the genus Beudanticeras.	
Rodingites	Gen. et comb. nov	Valid	Korn & Weyer	Carboniferous (Tournaisian)	Hangenberg Limestone	Germany	A member of the family Gattendorfiidae belonging to the subfamily Pseudarietitinae. The type species is "Pseudarietites" planissimus Vöhringer (1960); genus also includes "Pseudarietites" carinatus Vöhringer (1960).	
Rotopericyclus saourensis	Sp. nov	Valid	Korn in Zohara Malti et al.	Carboniferous (Tournaisian)	Hassi Sguilma Formation	Algeria		
Serpenticyclus	Gen. et comb. nov	Valid	Becker	Carboniferous (Tournaisian, possibly also Viséan)		Algeria; Morocco; Russia?	A member of the family Pericyclidae. The type species is "Helicocyclus" fuscus Korn et al. (2003); genus also includes "H." formosus Korn et al. (2010), "H." inornatus Korn et al. (2010), "H." laxaris Korn et al. (2010) and possibly "H." involutus Kusina in Shimankiy & Kusina (1977) and "H." aberratus Kusina and Konovalova (2004).	
Stockumites hofensis	Sp. nov	Valid	Korn & Weyer	Carboniferous (Tournaisian)		Germany	A member of the family Prionoceratidae belonging to the subfamily Acutimitoceratinae.	
Stockumites marocensis	Sp. nov	Valid	Korn & Weyer	Carboniferous		Morocco	A member of the family Prionoceratidae belonging to the subfamily Acutimitoceratinae.	
Stockumites nonaginta	Sp. nov	Valid	Korn & Weyer	Carboniferous (Tournaisian)		Germany	A member of the family Prionoceratidae belonging to the subfamily Acutimitoceratinae.	
Stockumites parallelus	Sp. nov	Valid	Korn & Weyer	Carboniferous (Tournaisian)	Stockum Limestone	Germany	A member of the family Prionoceratidae belonging to the subfamily Acutimitoceratinae.	
Stockumites voehringeri	Sp. nov	Valid	Korn & Weyer	Carboniferous (Tournaisian)	Hangenberg Limestone	Germany	A member of the family Prionoceratidae belonging to the subfamily Acutimitoceratinae.	
Tanabeceras nakagawaense	Sp. nov		Shigeta, Sakai & Fujita	Late Cretaceous (Cenomanian)		Japan	A member of the family Tetragonitidae.	
Tectocyclus	Gen. et sp. et comb. nov	Valid	Becker	Carboniferous (Viséan)		Morocco; United Kingdom	A member of the family Pericyclidae. The type species is T. herbigi; genus also includes "Helicocyclus" divergens Riley (1996).	
Tetragonites nanus	Sp. nov		Shigeta	Late Cretaceous (Coniacian to Campanian)		Japan	A member of the family Tetragonitidae.	
Tornoceras incisum	Sp. nov	Valid	Söte & Becker	Devonian (Frasnian)	Büdesheim Formation	Germany	A member of the family Tornoceratidae. Announced in 2022; the final article version was published in 2023.	
Tornoceras ventrovaricatum	Sp. nov	Valid	Söte & Becker	Devonian (Frasnian)	Büdesheim Formation	Germany	A member of the family Tornoceratidae. Announced in 2022; the final article version was published in 2023.	
Ulyanovskiceras	Gen. et comb. nov	Valid	Delanoy & Baudouin	Early Cretaceous (Aptian)		Russia	A member of the family Ancyloceratidae. The type species is "Audouliceras" vyrystaykense Stenshin, Shumilkin & Uspensky (2014); genus also includes "Audouliceras" brusyankense Stenshin, Shumilkin & Uspensky (2014) and "Audouliceras" mordovense Stenshin, Shumilkin & Uspensky (2014).	
Virgonisites	Gen. et sp. nov	Valid	Delanoy & Baudouin	Early Cretaceous (Barremian)		France	A member of the family Ancyloceratidae. The type species is V. sippae.	
Vutacuracrioceras	Gen. et comb. nov		Marin, Aguirre-Urreta & Rawson	Early Cretaceous (Hauterivian)		Argentina	A new genus for "Paraspiticeras" groeberi Aguirre-Urreta (1993).	
Weyerella lenis	Sp. nov	Valid	Korn & Weyer	Carboniferous (Tournaisian)	Hangenberg Limestone	Germany	A member of the family Gattendorfiidae belonging to the subfamily Gattendorfiinae.	
Zadelsdorfia oblita	Sp. nov	Valid	Korn & Weyer	Carboniferous (Tournaisian)	Hangenberg Limestone	Germany	A member of the family Gattendorfiidae belonging to the subfamily Gattendorfiinae.	
Zadelsdorfia zana	Sp. nov	Valid	Korn & Weyer	Carboniferous		Morocco	A member of the family Gattendorfiidae belonging to the subfamily Gattendorfiinae.	

=== Ammonite research ===
- A study on the swimming capabilities of ammonites, aiming to determine hydrodynamic costs and advantages provided by different conch geometries, is published by Ritterbush & Hebdon (2023).
- A study on the mechanics and fluid dynamics of ammonite swimming is published by De Blasio (2023).
- Revision of the Middle Triassic ammonite assemblage from the Samobor and Žumberak Mountains (Croatia) is published by Vidaković et al. (2023), who consider "Protrachyceras" dorae Salopek (1912) to be the only unambiguously valid species with a holotype from the Gregurić Breg locality, and transfer this species to the genus Eoprotrachyceras.
- Revision of the early Kimmeridgian ammonites from the planula Biohorizon of the Wohlgeschichtete Kalk Formation (Germany) is published by Jantschke & Schweigert (2023).
- Revision of acanthohoplitid taxa from the Aptian strata from Dagestan (Russia) is published by Frau (2023), who considers Protacanthoplites abichi to be a synonym of Acanthohoplites aschiltaensis, and retains A. aschiltaensis as the senior valid name.
- Evidence from the Albian fossil material from the Clansayes locality (France), interpreted as indicative of the presence of sexual dimorphism in Mariella bergeri, as well as indicating that upper Albian Mariella, lower Cenomanian Mariella and lower Cenomanian Hypoturrilites share the same peristome morphology, is presented by Jattiot et al. (2023).
- A specimen of Prionocyclus germari found in association with an aptychus referred to the genus Praestriaptychus is described from the Turonian strata near Úpohlavy (Czech Republic) by Košťák et al. (2023).
- A specimen of Mammites nodosoides, preserved with bite traces interpreted as most likely resulting from a lethal attack of a mosasaur directed at the apertural part of the ammonite with the head and arm crown, is described from the Turonian Bílá Hora Formation (Czech Republic) by Mazuch et al. (2023).
- A study on the evolution of the peculiar morphology of Pravitoceras sigmoidale is published by Misaki, Okamoto & Maeda (2023).
- Shigeta & Maeda (2023) describe new fossil material of ammonites from the Maastrichtian Krasnoyarka Formation (Sakhalin, Russia), including fossils of Zelandites varuna, Gaudryceras seymouriense, Pachydiscus subcompressus and Anagaudryceras mikobokense, and interpret the presence of these species as indicative of the influx of immigrant ammonite species into the Northwest Pacific region during late Maastrichtian, which might have been associated with cooling after the greenhouse Middle Maastrichtian Event.

== Other cephalopods ==
Name	Novelty	Status	Authors	Age	Type locality	Location	Notes	Images
Aphelaeceras validum	Sp. nov	Valid	Korn in Zohara Malti et al.	Carboniferous (Tournaisian)	Hassi Sguilma Formation	Algeria		
Cenoceras polonicum	Sp. nov		Jain et al.	Jurassic		Poland		
Cenoceras rumelangense	Sp. nov		Weis & Schweigert in Weis, Schweigert & Wittische	Middle Jurassic		Germany; Luxembourg		
Conchorhynchus tabellulis	Sp. nov	Valid	Martinez	Eocene		France		
Ellesmeroceras humahuacaensis	Sp. nov	Valid	Cichowolski et al.	Ordovician (Tremadocian)	Santa Rosita Formation	Argentina		
Endoceras novamagnum	Nom. nov	Valid	Greenfield	Late Ordovician	Saxby locality	Estonia	A replacement name for Endoceras magnum Stumbur (1956).	
Endoceras secundepressum	Nom. nov	Valid	Greenfield	Middle Ordovician	Jigunsan Formation	South Korea	A replacement name for Endoceras depressum Yun (2011).	
Endolobus rota	Sp. nov	Valid	Korn & Klug	Carboniferous (Viséan)	Zrigat Formation	Morocco		
Ephippioceras pygops	Sp. nov	Valid	Korn & Klug	Carboniferous (Viséan)	Zrigat Formation	Morocco	A member of the family Ephippioceratidae.	
Epidomatoceras ebbighausenorum	Sp. nov	Valid	Korn & Klug	Carboniferous (Viséan)	Hamou-Rhanem Formation	Morocco	A member of the family Grypoceratidae.	
Foveroceras	Gen. et sp. nov	Valid	Leonova & Shchedukhin	Permian (Asselian-Sakmarian)		Russia (Bashkortostan)	A member of Nautilida belonging to the family Permoceratidae. The type species is F. magnum.	
Germanonautilus warthi	Sp. nov	Valid	Schweigert	Early Jurassic (Pliensbachian)	Numismalismergel Formation	Germany		
Linteroceras	Nom. nov	Valid	Mironenko	Carboniferous		Russia	A replacement name for Linter Shimansky (1968).	
Liroceras karaouii	Sp. nov	Valid	Korn & Klug	Carboniferous (Viséan)	Mougoui Ayoun Formation	Morocco		
Liroceras vermis	Sp. nov	Valid	Korn & Klug	Carboniferous (Viséan)	Hamou-Rhanem Formation	Morocco		
Micronautilus	Gen. et 2 sp. nov	Valid	Branger	Middle Jurassic (Bathonian)		France	A member of the family Paracenoceratidae. The type species is M. evolutus; genus also includes M. minoti.	
Nautilaphractus	Nom. nov	Valid	Ceccolini & Cianferoni	Carboniferous		Russia	A replacement name for Aphractus Shimansky (1967).	
Omorphoceras	Gen. et sp. nov	Valid	Leonova & Shchedukhin	Permian (Asselian-Sakmarian)		Russia (Bashkortostan)	A member of the family Grypoceratidae. The type species is O. igori.	
Shikhanonautilus compressus	Sp. nov	Valid	Shchedukhin	Permian (Asselian-Sakmarian)		Russia (Bashkortostan)	A member of the family Liroceratidae.	
Sichuanobelus luxiensis	Sp. nov		Ma et al.	Late Triassic (Carnian)	Xiaowa Formation	China	A member of Belemnitida belonging to the family Sinobelemnitidae.	
Solenochilus lucynae	Sp. nov	Valid	Korn & Klug	Carboniferous (Viséan)	Mougoui Ayoun Formation	Morocco		
Solenochilus pohlei	Sp. nov	Valid	Korn & Klug	Carboniferous (Viséan)	Mougoui Ayoun Formation	Morocco		
Stenopoceras (Leptodomatoceras) bashkiricum	Sp. nov	Valid	Leonova & Shchedukhin	Permian (Asselian-Sakmarian)		Russia (Bashkortostan)	A member of the family Grypoceratidae.	
Temnocheilus aubrechtovae	Sp. nov	Valid	Korn & Klug	Carboniferous (Viséan)	Mougoui Ayoun Formation	Morocco	A member of the family Trigonoceratidae.	
Temnocheilus imazighenorum	Sp. nov	Valid	Korn & Klug	Carboniferous (Viséan)	Zrigat Formation	Morocco	A member of the family Trigonoceratidae.	
Trocholites chaloupkai	Sp. nov	Valid	Aubrechtová, Turek & Manda	Ordovician (Katian)	Upper Zahořany Formation	Czech Republic		
Uralharuspex	Nom. nov	Valid	Ceccolini & Cianferoni	Carboniferous		Russia	A replacement name for Haruspex Shimansky (1968).	
Vampyrofugiens	Gen. et sp. nov	Valid	Rowe et al.	Middle Jurassic (Callovian)	La Voulte-sur-Rhône lagerstätte	France	A member of Vampyromorpha belonging to the group Loligosepiina and the family Geopeltidae. The type species is V. atramentum.	
Vestinautilus kesslerae	Sp. nov	Valid	Korn & Klug	Carboniferous (Viséan)	Zrigat Formation	Morocco	A member of the family Trigonoceratidae.	

=== Other cephalopod research ===
- A study on the phylogenetic relationships of belemnites is published by Stevens et al. (2023).
- Dzyuba et al. (2023) report the discovery of the fossil material of Arcobelus cf. krimholzi from the Jurassic (Toarcian–Aalenian) strata from the Kuoika kimberlite field (northeastern Siberian Platform, Olenek Uplift), and interpret putative Late Jurassic or Early Cretaceous belemnites from the studied area as possibly of Bajocian–Bathonian age.
- Evidence from clumped and stable isotopes and trace element data for three specimens from the Valanginian of southern Tibet and Madagascar, interpreted as indicating that Acroteuthis acrei and Duvalia sp. occupied shallower and warmer waters than Hibolithes jaculoides and that the latter belemnite was a fast swimmer that undertook vertical migration in the water column, is presented by Wang et al. (2023).
- Dernov (2023) reports the preservation of color patterns on conchs of nautiloid cephalopods from the Carboniferous (Moscovian) Kamenskaya Formation (Luhansk Oblast), interpreted as indicative of the presence of disruptive coloration.
- Wilmsen (2023) redescribes the Coniacian nautilid "Nautilus" sinuatoplicatus and transfers it to the genus Anglonautilus, filling a gap in the fossil record of this genus which was previously unknown from the late Cenomanian to early Campanian.
- A study aiming to determine the metabolic rates of ammonites and nautiloid cephalopods living at the end of the Cretaceous is published by Tajika et al. (2023), who find that the nautiloid Eutrephoceras had a lower metabolic rate than co-occurring ammonites, and argue that the lower metabolic rate in nautiloids might have been an advantage during the Cretaceous–Paleogene extinction event.
- Klug et al. (2023) report evidence of preservation of axial nerve cords in specimens of Jurassic cephalopods from France and Germany.
- Syllipsimopodi bideni, originally described as a member of the clade Vampyropoda, is reinterpreted as a probable junior synonym of Gordoniconus beargulchensis and unlikely to be a vampyropod by Klug et al. (2023); in a subsequent study Whalen & Landman (2023) support the interpretation of S. bideni as distinct from G. beargulchensis, but hint that further analyses might be needed to confirm the hypothesis that it is a vampyropod.
- Rogov et al. (2023) report the discovery of jaws of decabrachian coleoids from the Toarcian deposits of the Vilyui River basin (Sakha, Russia), representing the first finding of coleoid jaws in the Lower Jurassic strata in Siberia reported to date.
- Tanabe & Misaki (2023) describe new coleoid fossil material from the Upper Cretaceous Yezo Group (Japan), including a large upper jaw of an indeterminate member of Oegopsida and two lower jaws possibly belonging to members of the species Longibelus matsumotoi, and interpret the anatomy of the studied lower jaws as supporting the interpretation of Longibelus as a relative of Decapodiformes.
- An assemblage of coleoid cephalopods, including the latest record of Belosaepia blainvillei, is described from the Eocene (Priabonian) Mandrykivka Beds (Ukraine) by Dernov & Demianov (2023).
- Mironenko (2023) describes phosphatized jaws of cephalopods (mostly coleoids, but also one nautilid specimen) from the Upper Jurassic, Lower and Upper Cretaceous localities in Russia, including jaws likely belonging to large-bodied coleoids.

== Bivalves ==
Name	Novelty	Status	Authors	Age	Type locality	Location	Notes	Images
Acharax frenademezi	Sp. nov	Valid	Prinoth & Posenato	Permian (Changhsingian)	Bellerophon Formation	Italy	A member of the family Solemyidae.	
Alena	Gen. et sp. nov		Polechová, Zicha & Rak	Ordovician (Sandbian)	Letná Formation	Czech Republic	A member of Pteriomorphia, possibly belonging to the group Cyrtodontida. The type species is A. pustulosa. The generic name is shared with Alena Navas (1916).	
Allemanella	Gen. et comb. nov	Valid	Cooper	Cretaceous		Argentina; Chile; Peru	A member of Trigoniida belonging to the family Rutitrigoniidae and the subfamily Syrotrigoniinae. The type species is "Quoiecchia" sigeli Leanza & Garate Zubillaga (1987); genus also includes "Buchotrigonia" biroi Pérez & Reyes (1986), "Trigonia" boiti Lissón (1930), "Buchotrigonia" chilensis Pérez & Reyes (1986) and "Syrotrigonia" obesa Pérez & Reyes (1997).	
Bakevellia (Bakevellia) preromangica	Sp. nov	Valid	Prinoth & Posenato	Permian (Changhsingian)	Bellerophon Formation	Italy	A member of the family Bakevelliidae.	
Bathyisognomon	Gen. et sp. nov	Valid	Hickman	Eocene	Keasey Formation	United States (Oregon)	A member of the family Isognomonidae. The type species is B. smithwickensis.	
Delectopecten keaseyorum	Sp. nov	Valid	Hickman	Paleogene	Keasey Formation	United States (Oregon)	A species of Delectopecten.	
Delectopecten kieli	Sp. nov	Valid	Hickman	Paleogene	Keasey Formation	United States (Oregon)	A species of Delectopecten.	
Earlpackardia methowensis	Sp. nov	Valid	Halligan	Early Cretaceous (Albian)		United States (Washington)	A member of Trigoniida belonging to the family Rutitrigoniidae.	
Edmondia hautmanni	Sp. nov	Valid	Prinoth & Posenato	Permian (Changhsingian)	Bellerophon Formation	Italy	A member of the family Edmondiidae.	
Etayosernella	Gen. et comb. et sp. nov	Valid	Cooper	Early Cretaceous		Colombia	A member of Trigoniida belonging to the family Rutitrigoniidae and the subfamily Syrotrigoniinae. The type species is "Trigonia (Laevitrigonia)" scheibei Dietrich (1938); genus also includes new species E. noetlingi.	
Etheripecten stuflesseri	Sp. nov	Valid	Prinoth & Posenato	Permian (Changhsingian)	Bellerophon Formation	Italy	A member of Pectinida belonging to the family Heteropectinidae.	
Gardenapecten	Gen. et comb. nov	Valid	Prinoth & Posenato	Permian (Changhsingian)	Bellerophon Formation	Italy	A member of Pectinida belonging to the superfamily Aviculopectinoidea and the family Asoellidae. The type species is "Pecten (Aviculopecten)" trinkeri Stache (1878); genus also includes "Pecten (Aviculopecten)" comelicanus Stache (1878).	
Glycymeris (Glycymeris) radiolyrata exaggerata	Ssp. nov	Valid	Moerdijk & van Nieulande	Pliocene		Belgium; United Kingdom	A member of the family Glycymerididae.	
Incagonia	Gen. et comb. nov	Valid	Cooper	Cretaceous		Peru	A member of Trigoniida belonging to the family Rutitrigoniidae and the subfamily Syrotrigoniinae. The type species is "Trigonia" mathewsi Richards (1947); genus also includes "Trigonia" flexicostata Fritzsche (1924), "Trigonia" forti Lissón (1930), "Trigonia" gerthi Lissón (1930), "Trigonia" inca Fritzsche (1924), "Trigonia" lorentii Dana (1849) and "Trigonia" paradisensis Lissón (1907).	
Ionesimactra	Nom. nov	Valid	Signorelli				A member of the family Mactridae; a replacement name for Caspimactra Ionesi. The type species is "Mactra" caspia Eichwald.	
Isorropodon humptulipsense	Sp. nov	Valid	Kiel, Amano & Goedert	Eocene	Humptulips Formation	United States (Washington)	A member of the family Vesicomyidae.	
Ladinomya	Gen. et sp. nov	Valid	Prinoth & Posenato	Permian (Changhsingian)	Bellerophon Formation	Italy	A member of the superfamily Trigonioidea, the type genus of the new family Ladinomyidae. The type species is L. fosteri.	
Leguminaia hedenborgi	Sp. nov	Valid	Schneider & Linse	Pliocene–Pleistocene boundary	Kritika Formation	Greece	A member of the family Unionidae belonging to the subfamily Gonideinae.	
Limopsis squiresi	Sp. nov	Valid	Hickman	Paleogene	Keasey Formation	United States (Oregon)	A species of Limopsis.	
Lovaralucina	Gen. et sp. nov	Valid	Prinoth & Posenato	Permian (Changhsingian)	Bellerophon Formation	Italy	A member of the family Lucinidae. The type species is L. covidi.	
Lucina dickersoni	Nom. nov	Valid	Pacaud et al.	Paleocene		United States (California)	A species of Lucina; a replacement name for Phacoides quadrata Dickerson (1914).	
"Lucina" hungarica	Nom. nov	Valid	Pacaud et al.	Triassic		Hungary	A replacement name for Lucina quadrata Kutassy (1933).	
Lusitanigonia	Gen. et comb. nov	Valid	Cooper	Late Jurassic		Portugal	A member of Trigoniida belonging to the family Rutitrigoniidae and the subfamily Syrotrigoniinae. The type species is "Trigonia" freixialensis Choffat (1885); genus also includes "Trigonia" kobyi Choffat (1885).	
Macomopsis onubensis	Sp. nov	Valid	Brunetti & Della Bella	Pliocene		Spain	A member of the family Tellinidae.	
Macomopsis saccoi	Sp. nov	Valid	Brunetti & Della Bella	Pliocene (Piacenzian)		Italy	A member of the family Tellinidae.	
Matheronia carinata	Sp. nov		Masse, Fenerci-Masse & Bucur	Early Cretaceous (Barremian-Aptian)		Romania	A rudist bivalve belonging to the family Requieniidae.	
Matheronia dacica	Sp. nov		Masse, Fenerci-Masse & Bucur	Early Cretaceous (Barremian)		Romania	A rudist bivalve belonging to the family Requieniidae.	
Matheronia nerae	Sp. nov		Masse, Fenerci-Masse & Bucur	Early Cretaceous (Barremian-Aptian)		Romania	A rudist bivalve belonging to the family Requieniidae.	
Matheronia silvaeregis	Sp. nov		Masse, Fenerci-Masse & Bucur	Early Cretaceous (Aptian)		Romania	A rudist bivalve belonging to the family Requieniidae.	
Meleagrinella golberti	Sp. nov	Valid	Lutikov & Arp	Early Jurassic (Toarcian)		Canada; Germany; Russia; United Kingdom	A member of the family Oxytomidae. Published online in 2023, but the issue date is listed as December 2022.	
Meleagrinella prima	Sp. nov	Valid	Lutikov in Lutikov & Arp	Early Jurassic (Toarcian)		Russia	A member of the family Oxytomidae. Published online in 2023, but the issue date is listed as December 2022.	
Miltha (sensu lato) romaniae	Sp. nov	Valid	Kiel, Sami & Taviani	Miocene		Italy	A member of the family Lucinidae.	
Moerella etrusca	Sp. nov	Valid	Brunetti & Della Bella	Pliocene		Italy	A member of the family Tellinidae.	
Moerella hispanica	Sp. nov	Valid	Brunetti & Della Bella	Pliocene		Spain	A member of the family Tellinidae.	
Nuculoma douvillei	Sp. nov	Valid	Ayoub-Hannaa, Fürsich & Abdelhady	Middle Jurassic (Bathonian to Callovian)	Kehailia Formation	Egypt	A member of the family Nuculidae.	
Nuculoma sinaiensis	Sp. nov	Valid	Ayoub-Hannaa, Fürsich & Abdelhady	Jurassic (Toarcian to lower Kimmeridgian)	Bir Maghara Formation	Egypt	A member of the family Nuculidae.	
Pachygervillia	Gen. et sp. et comb. nov	Valid	Posenato & Crippa	Early Jurassic (Sinemurian–Toarcian)	Rotzo Formation	Italy	A member of Ostreida belonging to the family Plicatostylidae. The type species is P. anguillaensis; genus also includes "Perna" taramellii Boehm (1884).	
Pachytraga carpathica	Sp. nov		Masse, Fenerci-Masse & Bucur	Early Cretaceous (Barremian)		Romania	A rudist bivalve belonging to the family Caprinidae.	
Pachytraga gracilis	Sp. nov		Masse, Frau & Fenerci-Masse	Early Cretaceous (Barremian)		France	A rudist bivalve belonging to the family Caprinidae.	
Palaeolima badiotica	Sp. nov	Valid	Prinoth & Posenato	Permian (Changhsingian)	Bellerophon Formation	Italy	A member of the family Limidae.	
Palaeoneilo aegyptiaca	Sp. nov	Valid	Ayoub-Hannaa, Fürsich & Abdelhady	Jurassic (Bajocian to Bathonian)	Kehailia Formation	Egypt	A member of Nuculanida belonging the family Cucullellidae.	
Parvitrigonia	Gen. et sp. nov	Valid	Halligan	Early Cretaceous (Albian)		United States (Washington)	A member of Trigoniida belonging to the family Rutitrigoniidae. The type species is P. cooperi.	
Pinna pacata	Sp. nov	Valid	Shilekhin, Mazaev & Biakov	Permian		Russia	A species of Pinna.	
Pleurophopsis thieli	Sp. nov	Valid	Kiel, Amano & Goedert	Oligocene	Makah Formation	United States (Washington)	A member of the family Vesicomyidae.	
Pliocardia? guthrieorum	Sp. nov	Valid	Kiel, Amano & Goedert	Oligocene	Lincoln Creek Formation	United States (Washington)	Possibly a species of Pliocardia.	
Promytilus merlai	Sp. nov	Valid	Prinoth & Posenato	Permian (Changhsingian)	Bellerophon Formation	Italy	A member of the family Mytilidae.	
Propeamussium (Parvamussium) mistensis	Sp. nov	Valid	Hickman	Paleogene	Keasey Formation	United States (Oregon)	A species of Propeamussium.	
Prospondylus shakhtauensis	Sp. nov	Valid	Biakov in Biakov & Mazaev	Permian		Russia	A member of Pectinida belonging to the family Prospondylidae.	
Pseudomiltha horcsarriu	Sp. nov	Valid	Pacaud et al.	Eocene (Bartonian)		France	A member of the family Lucinidae.	
Sisonia ultimoi	Sp. nov	Valid	Kiel, Sami & Taviani	Miocene (Langhian)		Italy	A bivalve of uncertain affinities.	
Squiresica plana	Sp. nov	Valid	Kiel, Amano & Goedert	Oligocene	Lincoln Creek Formation	United States (Washington)	A member of the family Vesicomyidae.	
Squiresica yooni	Sp. nov	Valid	Kiel, Amano & Goedert	Miocene	Duho Formation	South Korea	A member of the family Vesicomyidae.	
Streblopteria gracilicosta	Sp. nov	Valid	Biakov	Permian		Russia	A member of Pectinida belonging to the family Streblochondriidae.	
Streblopteria parenensis	Sp. nov	Valid	Biakov	Permian		Russia	A member of Pectinida belonging to the family Streblochondriidae.	
Tambanella? stetteneckensis	Sp. nov	Valid	Prinoth & Posenato	Permian (Changhsingian)	Bellerophon Formation	Italy	A member of the family Bakevelliidae.	
Thiadensia	Gen. et comb. nov		Mitchell	Late Cretaceous (Maastrichtian)		Cuba	A rudist bivalve belonging to the subfamily Radiolitidae. The type species is "Bournonia" planasi Thiadens (1936).	
Valenciella	Gen. et comb. nov	Valid	Cooper	Cretaceous		Egypt; Lebanon; Spain	A member of Trigoniida belonging to the family Rutitrigoniidae and the subfamily Syrotrigoniinae. The type species is "Trigonia" picteti Coquand (1863); genus also includes "Trigonia" analoga Douvillé (1916), "Trigonia" depauperata Douvillé (1916), "Trigonia" higazyi Abbass (1962), "Trigonia" loutfyi Abbass (1962), "Trigonia" magharensis Abbass (1962) and "Trigonia" undulatocostata Blanckenhorn (1890).	
Vermuntia	Gen. et comb. nov		Mitchell	Late Cretaceous		Jamaica	A rudist bivalve belonging to the subfamily Radiolitidae. The type species is "Radiolites" macroplicatus Whitfield (1897); genus also includes "Branislavia" stellaplicatus Mitchell & Ramsook (2009).	
Volsellina carinata	Sp. nov	Valid	Prinoth & Posenato	Permian (Changhsingian)	Bellerophon Formation	Italy	A member of the family Mytilidae.	
Yuexiconcha	Gen. et sp. nov	Valid	Zhang, Niu & Johnston in Niu et al.	Ordovician	Dongchong Formation	China	A member of Protobranchia, possibly belonging to the family Nuculidae. The type species is Y. duplicata.	

=== Bivalve research ===
- Description of shell microstructure and muscle attachment scars from the inner surface on the shell in specimens of Fordilla troyensis from the Cambrian Aftenstjernesø Formation (Greenland) is published by Peel (2023).
- A study on the fossil record of bivalves is published by Zhou et al. (2023), who report that bivalves did not undergo and increase in taxonomic, morphological and functional diversity until the Ordovician, and did not undergo a burst of functional diversity relative to taxonomic diversity even during their Ordovician diversification.
- A study on the diversification dynamics of bivalves and brachiopods throughout their evolutionary histories is published by Guo et al. (2023), who interpret their findings as indicating that the switch from brachiopods to bivalves as major seabed organisms was unlikely to be caused by competitive exclusion of brachiopods by bivalves, but rather was likely caused by loss of brachiopod diversity in the Permian–Triassic extinction event and by bivalve diversification in the Cretaceous and Cenozoic that wasn't matched by brachiopods.
- A study on changes of taxonomic and functional diversity of bivalves during the Triassic-Jurassic transition is published by Abdelhady et al. (2023), who consider the sea-level fall causing the destruction of shallower marine habitats to be the primary cause of bivalve extinction in the studied time interval.
- Description of a new Cenomanian rudist assemblage from the Gattar Member of the Zebbag Formation (Tunisia), and study on the relationships between the new assemblage and other Cenomanian rudist assemblages from North Africa and the Levant region, is published by Philip, Negra & Bachari (2023).
- Özer & Săsăran (2023) reexamine the holotype and paratypes of Lattenbergites hermi, and interpret it as a junior synonym of the radiolitid species Joufia milovanovici.
- Evidence from fossils from the Pecínov Member of the Peruc–Korycany Formation and from the Bílá Hora Formation (Czech Republic), indicative of changes of the composition of the bivalve assemblages resulting from the Cenomanian-Turonian boundary event, is presented by Kunstmüllerová & Košťák (2023).

== Gastropods ==
Name	Novelty	Status	Authors	Age	Type locality	Location	Notes	Images
Agathotoma estherae	Sp. nov	Valid	Landau, Harzhauser & Giannuzzi-Savelli	Pliocene		Spain	A species of Agathotoma.	
Akburunella laminaris	Sp. nov	Valid	Guzhov	Miocene		Russia	Published online in 2023, but the issue date is listed as December 2022.	
Akburunella nefanda archaica	Ssp. nov	Valid	Guzhov	Miocene		Russia	Published online in 2023, but the issue date is listed as December 2022.	
Akburunella sinuosa	Sp. nov	Valid	Guzhov	Miocene		Russia	Published online in 2023, but the issue date is listed as December 2022.	
Akburunella spinosa	Sp. nov	Valid	Guzhov	Miocene		Russia	Published online in 2023, but the issue date is listed as December 2022.	
Aliculastrum suratensis	Sp. nov		Banerjee & Halder	Eocene	Cambay Shale	India	A species of Aliculastrum.	
Altadema hausmannae	Sp. nov	Valid	Nützel & Karapunar	Early Triassic	Werfen Formation	Italy	A member of the family Goniasmatidae.	
Alvania praetermissa	Sp. nov	Valid	Landau, Van Dingenen & Ceulemans	Miocene		France	A species of Alvania.	
Ammotectonica	Gen. et sp. et comb. nov	Valid	Harzhauser & Landau	Miocene and Pliocene		Czech Republic; Hungary; Italy	A member of the family Architectonicidae. The type species is A. gregorovae; genus also includes "Solarium" emiliae Semper (1861), "Solarium" deshayesii Michelotti (1847) and "Solarium" soproniense Strausz (1960).	
Andonia fosseensis	Sp. nov	Valid	Landau, Van Dingenen & Ceulemans	Miocene		France		
Aspella tusciae	Sp. nov	Valid	Forli, Cresti & Pagli	Pliocene		Italy	A species of Aspella.	
Athleta (Volutospina) baili	Sp. nov	Valid	Pacaud & Ledon	Eocene (Bartonian)		France	A species of Athleta.	
Attiliosa emilyae	Sp. nov	Valid	Lozouet	Oligocene		France	A species of Attiliosa.	
Attiliosa septaspinosa	Sp. nov	Valid	Lozouet	Oligocene		France	A species of Attiliosa.	
Attiliosa subgretae	Sp. nov	Valid	Lozouet	Oligocene		France	A species of Attiliosa.	
Bela obesoiberica	Sp. nov	Valid	Landau, Harzhauser & Giannuzzi-Savelli	Pliocene		Spain	A species of Bela.	
Bela olivoidea	Sp. nov	Valid	Landau, Harzhauser & Giannuzzi-Savelli	Pliocene		Spain	A species of Bela.	
Bernaya kaylinae	Sp. nov	Valid	Squires & Groves	Eocene	Llajas Formation	United States (California)	A species of Bernaya.	
Bittium binodulosum	Sp. nov	Junior homonym	Guzhov	Miocene		Russia (Adygea)	A species of Bittium. Published online in 2023, but the issue date is listed as December 2022. The specific name is preoccupied by Bittium binodulosum Yokoyama (1920); Guzhov in Harzhauser, Guzhov & Landau (2025) coined a replacement name Bittium nabokovorum.	
Bittium miradouroense	Sp. nov	Valid	Sacchetti, Landau & Ávila	Pliocene		Portugal (Azores)	A species of Bittium.	
Bizetiella attiliosaformis	Sp. nov	Valid	Lozouet	Miocene		France	A species of Bizetiella.	
Bolma redoniana	Nom. nov	Valid	Landau, Van Dingenen & Ceulemans	Miocene		France	A species of Bolma; a replacement name for Turbo trochleatus Millet.	
Brachystomia succineiformis	Sp. nov	Valid	Guzhov	Miocene		Russia	A species of Brachystomia. Published online in 2023, but the issue date is listed as December 2022.	
Brookesena romandiola	Sp. nov	Valid	Tabanelli et al.	Pliocene		Italy	A species of Brookesena.	
Caecum roederi	Sp. nov	Valid	Raines, Powell & LaFollette	Miocene		United States (California)	A species of Caecum.	
Calagrassor mathiasi	Sp. nov	Valid	Kovács, Leél-Őssy & Vicián	Miocene	Pétervására Formation	Hungary	A species of Calagrassor.	
Calliostoma nandori	Sp. nov	Valid	Kovács, Leél-Őssy & Vicián	Miocene	Pétervására Formation	Hungary	A species of Calliostoma.	
Calotrophon vaporosus	Sp. nov	Valid	Lozouet	Oligocene		France	A species of Calotrophon.	
Carychium nashuaense	Sp. nov	Valid	Jochum, Lee & Portell in Jochum et al.	Early Pleistocene	Nashua Formation	United States (Florida)	A species of Carychium.	
Cerion (Strophiops) palacioi	Sp. nov	Valid	Suárez	Pliocene-Pleistocene	Río Maya Formation	Cuba	A species of Cerion.	
Cerithiella bisulcata	Sp. nov	Valid	Landau, Van Dingenen & Ceulemans	Miocene		France	A species of Cerithiella.	
Chauvetia brunettii	Sp. nov	Valid	Landau & Micali	Pliocene		Italy; Spain	A species of Chauvetia.	
Chauvetia fenestrata	Sp. nov	Valid	Landau & Micali	Pliocene (Piacenzian)		Spain	A species of Chauvetia.	
Chauvetia fortiornata	Sp. nov	Valid	Landau & Micali	Pliocene (Piacenzian)		Spain	A species of Chauvetia.	
Chauvetia hoffmani	Sp. nov	Valid	Landau & Micali	Pliocene (Piacenzian)		Spain	A species of Chauvetia.	
Chauvetia janseni	Sp. nov	Valid	Landau & Micali	Pliocene (Piacenzian)		Spain	A species of Chauvetia.	
Chauvetia obesa	Sp. nov	Valid	Landau & Micali	Pliocene (Piacenzian)		Spain	A species of Chauvetia.	
Chauvetia oliveri	Sp. nov	Valid	Landau & Micali	Pliocene (Piacenzian)		Spain	A species of Chauvetia.	
Chauvetia pseudopelorcei	Sp. nov	Valid	Landau & Micali	Pliocene (Piacenzian)		Spain	A species of Chauvetia.	
Chauvetia sinuosa	Sp. nov	Valid	Landau & Micali	Pliocene (Piacenzian)		Spain	A species of Chauvetia.	
Chauvetia solida	Sp. nov	Valid	Landau & Micali	Pliocene (Piacenzian)		Spain	A species of Chauvetia.	
Chauvetia spinosa	Sp. nov	Valid	Landau & Micali	Pliocene (Piacenzian)		Spain	A species of Chauvetia.	
Chesathais pungoensis	Sp. nov	Valid	Petuch & Berschauer	Miocene	Pungo River Formation	United States (North Carolina)		
Chicoreus marcominii	Sp. nov	Valid	Lozouet	Miocene		France	A species of Chicoreus.	
Chicoreus sacyi	Sp. nov	Valid	Lozouet	Oligocene		France	A species of Chicoreus.	
Cingulina eamesi	Sp. nov		Banerjee & Halder	Eocene	Cambay Shale	India	A species of Cingulina.	
Cirsotrema kokayi	Sp. nov	Valid	Kovács, Leél-Őssy & Vicián	Miocene	Pétervására Formation	Hungary	A species of Cirsotrema.	
Clanculus s. l. gulyasi	Sp. nov	Valid	Kovács, Leél-Őssy & Vicián	Miocene	Pétervására Formation	Hungary	A member of the family Trochidae.	
Clavatula s. l. barnabasi	Sp. nov	Valid	Kovács, Leél-Őssy & Vicián	Miocene	Pétervására Formation	Hungary	A member of the family Clavatulidae.	
Clavatula s. l. istvani	Sp. nov	Valid	Kovács, Leél-Őssy & Vicián	Miocene	Pétervására Formation	Hungary	A member of the family Clavatulidae.	
"Clavatula" pettkoi	Sp. nov	Valid	Biskupič	Miocene	Studienka Formation	Slovakia	A member of the family Clavatulidae.	
Conomurex indica	Sp. nov	Valid	Bose, Das & Saha	Miocene	Dwarka Basin	India	A species of Conomurex.	
Conotomaria dovilleae	Sp. nov	Valid	Chaix & Grenier	Late Cretaceous (Campanian)		France	A member of the family Pleurotomariidae.	
Conotomaria pilonae	Sp. nov	Valid	Chaix & Grenier	Late Cretaceous (Campanian)		France	A member of the family Pleurotomariidae.	
Cornirostra anistratenkorum umbilicaris	Ssp. nov	Valid	Guzhov	Miocene		Russia	Published online in 2023, but the issue date is listed as December 2022.	
Cossmannina australis	Sp. nov		Ferrari	Early Jurassic (Pliensbachian)	Lepá Formation	Argentina	A member of Acteonoidea belonging to the family Tubiferidae.	
Costoanachis haurzhauseri	Sp. nov	Valid	Landau, Van Dingenen & Ceulemans	Miocene		France	A species of Costoanachis.	
Costoanachis malaquiasi	Sp. nov	Valid	Landau, Harzhauser & Monsecour	Pliocene (Piacenzian)		Spain	A species of Costoanachis.	
Costosyrnola taptiensis	Sp. nov		Banerjee & Halder	Eocene	Cambay Shale	India	A species of Costosyrnola.	
Cylichna (Cylichna) ypresiana	Sp. nov		Banerjee & Halder	Eocene	Cambay Shale	India	A species of Cylichna.	
Cylindrobullina caquelensis	Sp. nov		Ferrari	Early Jurassic (Pliensbachian)	Lepá Formation	Argentina	A member of Acteonoidea belonging to the family Cylindrobullinidae.	
Cymia (sensu lato) praecaerulea	Sp. nov	Valid	Lozouet	Oligocene		France	A member of the family Muricidae.	
Cymia (sensu lato) subcaerulea	Sp. nov	Valid	Lozouet	Oligocene		France	A member of the family Muricidae.	
Cypraedia misrensis	Nom. nov	Valid	Pacaud	Eocene (Bartonian)		Egypt	A member of the family Ovulidae; a replacement name for Cypraea (Cypraedia) arabica Cuvillier (1935).	
Dentimargo barnai	Sp. nov	Valid	Kovács, Leél-Őssy & Vicián	Miocene	Pétervására Formation	Hungary	A species of Dentimargo.	
Dilatilabrum mahalonobisi	Sp. nov	Valid	Bose, Das & Saha	Miocene	Dwarka Basin	India		
Echinophoria statioliteralis	Sp. nov		Darragh			Australia	A species of Echinophoria.	
Ecphora (Powhatan) grulkei	Sp. nov	Valid	Petuch & Berschauer			United States	A species of Ecphora.	
Ecphora roxaneae dalli	Ssp. nov	Valid	Petuch & Berschauer		Goose Creek Limestone	United States (South Carolina)		
Edrozeba	Gen. et 4 sp. et comb. nov	Valid	Guzhov	Miocene		Russia	A member of the family Hydrobiidae. The type species is E. caeca; genus also includes new species E. angulata, E. minuta and E. striata, as well as "Hydrobia" enikalensis Kolesnikov (1935). Published online in 2023, but the issue date is listed as December 2022.	
Ellobium kerwaense	Sp. nov	Valid	Harzhauser, Pacaud & Landau	Oligocene (Chattian)	Mány Formation	Hungary	A species of Ellobium.	
Eocypraea judithsmithae	Sp. nov	Valid	Groves & Squires	Eocene	Llajas Formation	United States (California)	A member of the family Eocypraeidae.	
Eoellobium	Gen. et comb. nov	Valid	Harzhauser, Pacaud & Landau	Eocene (Bartonian)		France	A member of the family Ellobiidae. The type species is "Auricula" heberti Vasseur (1881); genus also includes "Melampus" britannus Vasseur (1882) and "Auricula" simplex Cossmann (1895).	
Eopterodonta	Nom. nov	Valid	Pacaud	Late Cretaceous		France	A member of the family Tylostomatidae; a replacement name for Pterodonta d'Orbigny (1843).	
Erato mayeri	Sp. nov	Valid	Sacchetti, Landau & Ávila	Pliocene		Portugal (Azores)	A species of Erato.	
Eriptycha delpeyi	Sp. nov	Valid	Chaix in Chaix & Plicot	Late Cretaceous (Santonian)		France	A member of the family Ringiculidae.	
Eriptycha ? royi	Sp. nov	Valid	Chaix in Chaix & Plicot	Late Cretaceous (Santonian)		France	A member of the family Ringiculidae.	
Euspira? louiemarincovichi	Sp. nov		Powell & Dineen	Pleistocene (Gelasian)	Gubik Formation	United States (Alaska)	Possibly a species of Euspira.	
Falsipyrgula ? coronata	Sp. nov	Valid	Neubauer & Wesselingh	Pleistocene (Gelasian)	Kolankaya Formation	Turkey	A member of the family Hydrobiidae.	
Favartia faviai	Sp. nov	Valid	Lozouet	Miocene		France	A species of Favartia.	
Galeodea fuscirivularis	Sp. nov		Darragh			Australia	A species of Galeodea.	
Galeodea goudeyi	Sp. nov		Darragh			Australia	A species of Galeodea.	
Gibbula kralli	Sp. nov	Valid	Kovács, Leél-Őssy & Vicián	Miocene	Pétervására Formation	Hungary	A species of Gibbula.	
Glabrocingulum (Stenozone) heminodosus	Sp. nov		Pinilla & Taboada	Permian	Pampa de Tepuel Formation	Argentina	A member of the family Eotomariidae.	
Globecphora mardieae	Sp. nov	Valid	Petuch & Berschauer			United States		
Globiconcha vizcainoi	Sp. nov	Valid	Chaix in Chaix & Plicot	Late Cretaceous (Santonian)		France	A member of the family Acteonidae.	
Globulocerithium	Gen. et nom. nov	Valid	Pacaud	Paleogene		Belgium; France; Germany; Hungary; Italy; Poland; Ukraine	A member of the family Cerithiidae. The type species is "Cerithium" globulosus Deshayes (1833); genus also includes "Cerithium" coezi Boussac (1911), "Cerithium" dallagonis Oppenheim (1894), "Cerithium" felix Deshayes (1864), "Cerithium" filifer Deshayes (1833), "Cerithium" filigrana von Koenen (1891), "Cerithium" guilielmi de Raincourt (1877), "Cerithium" intradentatum Deshayes (1864), "Cerithium" meneghinii Michelotti (1861), "Potamides" montense Briart & Cornet (1873), "Cerithium" petrafixense Cossmann & Lambert (1884), "Cerithium" piriforme Defrance (1817), "Cerithium" semicostatum Deshayes (1833), "Cerithium" tenuistriatum Melleville (1843), "Cerithium" tournissanense Doncieux (1908), "Cerithium" tumidum Braun in Walchner (1851), "Cerithium" vandenheckei Bellardi (1852), "Pyrazus" vignyensis Bouniol (1981) and Globulocerithium nautagarona (a replacement name for Cerithium coloniae Leymerie, 1878).	
Graecoanatolica alcicekorum	Sp. nov	Valid	Neubauer & Wesselingh	Pleistocene (Gelasian)	Kolankaya Formation	Turkey	A species of Graecoanatolica.	
Hartmutix	Gen. et comb. nov	Valid	Neubauer & Harzhauser	Eocene		France	Possibly a member of the family Sphincterochilidae. The type species is "Helix" edwardsi Deshayes (1863).	
Harzhauseria	Gen. et sp. nov	Valid	Neubauer & Wesselingh	Pleistocene (Gelasian)	Kolankaya Formation	Turkey	A member of the family Hydrobiidae. The type species is H. schizopleura.	
Hastula wilmulderae	Sp. nov	Valid	Landau & Harzhauser	Pliocene (Piacenzian)		Spain	A species of Hastula.	
Heliacus globosus	Sp. nov	Valid	Harzhauser & Landau	Miocene	Baden Formation	Austria	A species of Heliacus.	
Helix kadolskyi	Nom. nov	Valid	Neubauer & Harzhauser	Miocene		Bulgaria	A species of Helix; a replacement name for Helix toulai Kojumdgieva (1969)	
Hemithersitea kanerus	Sp. nov	Valid	Bose, Das & Saha	Miocene	Dwarka Basin	India		
Hemithersitea nadharus	Sp. nov	Valid	Bose, Das & Saha	Miocene	Dwarka Basin	India		
Hydrobia neofrauenfeldi	Sp. nov	Valid	Guzhov	Miocene		Russia	A species of Hydrobia. Published online in 2023, but the issue date is listed as December 2022.	
Inella bentae	Sp. nov	Valid	Landau, Bakker & Marques da Silva	Pliocene	Estepona Basin	Spain	A species of Inella.	
Iraklimelania minutissima	Sp. nov	Valid	Neubauer & Wesselingh	Pleistocene (Gelasian)	Kolankaya Formation	Turkey	A member of the family Hydrobiidae.	
Iraklimelania submediocarinata	Sp. nov	Valid	Neubauer & Wesselingh	Pleistocene (Gelasian)	Kolankaya Formation	Turkey	A member of the family Hydrobiidae.	
Islamiella	Gen. et 2 sp. nov	Valid	Guzhov	Miocene		Russia (Adygea)	A member of the family Hydrobiidae. Genus includes I. miocenica and I. maeotica.	
Kantoria	Gen. et comb. et sp. nov	Valid	Landau & Harzhauser	Miocene and Pliocene		Austria; Italy; Spain	A member of the family Pseudomelatomidae. The type species is "Pleurotoma" coquandi Bellardi (1847); genus also includes new species K. castoris, as well as "Pleurotoma" lamarckii Michelotti (1847), "Knefastia" sinuslata Vera-Peláez (2002) and "Comitas" catherinae Vera-Peláez (2022).	
Laschmaspira lirata	Sp. nov	Valid	Nützel & Karapunar	Late Triassic (Carnian)	Hallstatt Limestone	Austria	A member of the family Goniasmatidae.	
Lagunaspira	Gen. et sp. nov		Pinilla & Taboada	Permian	Pampa de Tepuel Formation	Argentina	A member of the family Eotomariidae. The type species is L. labrocostellata.	
Leucotina costata	Sp. nov	Valid	Guzhov	Miocene		Russia (Adygea)	A species of Leucotina	
Leucotina excussa	Sp. nov	Valid	Guzhov	Miocene		Russia (Adygea)	A species of Leucotina	
Leucotina ovata	Sp. nov	Valid	Guzhov	Miocene		Russia (Adygea)	A species of Leucotina	
Leucotina ovatoides	Sp. nov	Valid	Guzhov	Miocene		Russia (Adygea)	A species of Leucotina	
Mangelia pseudoceddaensis	Sp. nov	Valid	Landau, Harzhauser & Giannuzzi-Savelli	Pliocene		Spain	A species of Mangelia.	
Mcleanarene	Gen. et nom. nov	Valid	Pacaud	Late Cretaceous (Campanian)		Spain	A member of the family Areneidae. The type species is M. taluniya (a replacement name for Arene mcleani Kiel & Bandel, 2002).	
Megastomia canaliculata	Sp. nov		Banerjee & Halder	Eocene	Cambay Shale	India	A species of Megastomia.	
Megastomia carinata	Sp. nov		Banerjee & Halder	Eocene	Cambay Shale	India	A species of Megastomia.	
Mitrella avilai	Sp. nov	Valid	Landau, Harzhauser & Monsecour	Pliocene (Piacenzian)		Spain	A species of Mitrella.	
Mitrella pagodiformis	Sp. nov	Valid	Landau, Harzhauser & Monsecour	Pliocene (Piacenzian)		Spain	A species of Mitrella.	
Mitrella soveri	Sp. nov	Valid	Kovács & Vicián	Miocene		Hungary	A species of Mitrella.	
Mitrella velerinensis	Sp. nov	Valid	Landau, Harzhauser & Monsecour	Pliocene (Piacenzian)		Spain	A species of Mitrella.	
Monteiroconus strauszi	Sp. nov	Valid	Kovács & Vicián	Miocene	Lajta Limestone Formation	Hungary	A member of the family Conidae.	
Morula (sensu lato) duplex	Sp. nov	Valid	Lozouet	Oligocene		France	A member of the family Muricidae.	
Nipteraxis deformatus	Sp. nov	Valid	Harzhauser & Landau	Miocene	Baden Formation	Austria		
Nucella demouthae	Sp. nov	Valid	Powell, Roth & Garcia	Miocene	Wilson Grove Formation	United States (California)	A species of Nucella.	
Ocenebra pseudoexcoelata	Sp. nov	Valid	Lozouet	Oligocene		France	A species of Ocenebra.	
Ocenebra tarusatensis	Sp. nov	Valid	Lozouet	Oligocene		France	A species of Ocenebra.	
Ocinebrina deaki	Sp. nov	Valid	Kovács, Leél-Őssy & Vicián	Miocene	Pétervására Formation	Hungary	A species of Ocinebrina.	
Odostomia caucasica	Sp. nov	Valid	Guzhov	Miocene		Russia	A species of Odostomia. Published online in 2023, but the issue date is listed as December 2022.	
Odostomia concavata	Sp. nov		Banerjee & Halder	Eocene	Cambay Shale	India	A species of Odostomia.	
Ophieulima ligeriana	Sp. nov	Valid	Landau, Van Dingenen & Ceulemans	Miocene		France	A species of Ophieulima.	
Ormastralium erazmusi	Sp. nov	Valid	Kovács, Leél-Őssy & Vicián	Miocene	Pétervására Formation	Hungary	A member of the family Turbinidae.	
Orthonychia yutaroi	Sp. nov	Valid	Ebbestad in Nützel et al.	Ordovician (Katian)	Boda Limestone	Sweden	A member of the family Orthonychiidae.	
Oxymeris transleithana	Sp. nov	Valid	Harzhauser & Landau	Miocene	Lajta Formation	Austria; Hungary	A species of Oxymeris.	
Pachycrommium gourguesi	Sp. nov	Valid	Pacaud et al.	Eocene (Bartonian)		France	A member of the family Ampullinidae.	
Palaeoglandina turolensis	Sp. nov	Valid	Albesa & Neubauer	Miocene (Tortonian) and Pliocene (Zanclean)	Teruel Basin	Spain	A member of the family Spiraxidae belonging to the subfamily Euglandininae.	
Palazzia omalogyroides	Sp. nov	Valid	Landau, Van Dingenen & Ceulemans	Miocene		France	A species of Palazzia.	
Palmoliva	Gen. et comb. nov	Valid	Allmon & Friend	Eocene		United States	A member of the family Ancillariidae. Genus includes "Ancillaria" tenera Conrad and Ancillaria scamba Conrad.	
Patagorbitestella leonensis	Sp. nov	Valid	Di Luca, Griffin & Pastorino	Miocene	Monte León Formation	Argentina	A member of the family Orbitestellidae.	
Peringia tarkhanica	Sp. nov	Valid	Guzhov	Miocene		Russia (Krasnodar Krai)	A species of Peringia.	
Pictarene	Gen. et nom. nov	Valid	Pacaud	Paleocene (Danian)		Denmark	A member of the family Areneidae. The type species is Pictarene faxensis (a replacement name for Delphinula (Pseudoninella) depressa Ravn, 1933).	
Pisania klaudiae	Sp. nov	Valid	Kovács & Vicián	Miocene		Hungary	A species of Pisania.	
Pleurotomaria durousseauorum	Sp. nov	Valid	Chaix & Grenier	Late Cretaceous (Campanian)		France		
Pomatiasia	Gen. et comb. nov	Valid	Guzhov	Miocene		Russia	A member of the family Hydrobiidae. Genus includes "Amnicola" cyclostomoides Sinzov (1880). Published online in 2023, but the issue date is listed as December 2022.	
Ponderia chattica	Sp. nov	Valid	Lozouet	Oligocene		France	A species of Ponderia.	
Probaicalia okurai	Sp. nov	In press	Isaji	Early Cretaceous (Barremian)	Itsuki Formation	Japan		
Pseudosimnia javanensis	Sp. nov	Valid	Celzard & Dovesi	Miocene		Indonesia	A species of Pseudosimnia.	
Pseudotorinia grasemanni	Sp. nov	Valid	Harzhauser & Landau	Miocene	Baden Formation	Austria; Bulgaria; Hungary	A species of Pseudotorinia.	
Pseudotuba	Gen. et comb. nov	Valid	Harzhauser & Landau	Eocene to Miocene		Austria; France; Hungary; Italy; Romania; United Kingdom	A member of the family Mathildidae. The type species is Tuba sulcata var. badensis Sacco (1895), raised to the rank of the species P. badensis; genus also includes "Cyclostoma" cancellata Grateloup (1828), "Tuba" pedemontana Sacco (1895), "Turbo" bellardii d'Orbigny (1852), "Littorina" cyclostomoides Deshayes (1861), "Tuba" elatospira Cossmann (1907) and "Turbo" sculptus Sowerby (1823).	
Pterynotus poustagnacensis	Sp. nov	Valid	Lozouet	Oligocene		France	A species of Pterynotus.	
Pupisoma (Ptychopatula) schaeferi	Sp. nov	Valid	Kadolsky	Miocene		Germany	A species of Pupisoma.	
Purpurellus aquitanicus	Sp. nov	Valid	Lozouet	Oligocene and Miocene		France	A species of Purpurellus.	
Pustulosia	Gen. et comb. nov	Valid	Harzhauser, Guzhov & Landau	Miocene		Ukraine	A member of the family Batillariidae. The type species is "Cerithium" submitrale Eichwald (1851); genus also includes "Cerithium" hornense Schaffer (1912).	
Putzeysia diversii	Sp. nov	Valid	Kiel, Sami & Taviani	Miocene (Langhian to Tortonian)		Italy	A Putzeysia.	
Pyrgiscus naldonii	Sp. nov	Valid	Tabanelli et al.	Pliocene		Italy	A species of Pyrgiscus.	
Pyrgiscus ruggierii	Sp. nov	Valid	Tabanelli et al.	Pliocene		Italy	A species of Pyrgiscus.	
Ringicula costata chokrakensis	Ssp. nov	Valid	Guzhov	Miocene		Russia	Published online in 2023, but the issue date is listed as December 2022.	
Ringicula costata paratethica	Ssp. nov	Valid	Guzhov	Miocene		Russia	Published online in 2023, but the issue date is listed as December 2022.	
Ringicula guzhovi	Nom. nov	Valid	Landau, Harzhauser & Malaquias	Miocene			A species of Ringicula; a replacement name for Voluta exilis Eichwald (1829).	
Ringicula knolli	Sp. nov		Banerjee & Halder	Eocene	Cambay Shale	India	A species of Ringicula.	
Ringicula subglobosa	Sp. nov	Valid	Guzhov	Miocene		Russia	A species of Ringicula. Published online in 2023, but the issue date is listed as December 2022.	
Rissoa federicoi	Nom. nov	Valid	Kovács & Stein	Miocene	Vienna Basin	Austria	A species of Rissoa; a replacement name for Rissoia (Turboella) acuticosta Sacco (1895).	
Sconsia landaui	Sp. nov	Valid	Kovács, Leél-Őssy & Vicián	Miocene	Pétervására Formation	Hungary	A species of Sconsia.	
Setia minutissima	Sp. nov	Valid	Landau, Van Dingenen & Ceulemans	Miocene		France	A species of Setia.	
Simplexollata	Gen. et sp. et comb. nov	Valid	Harzhauser & Landau	Oligocene to Pleistocene		Austria; Bulgaria; Czech Republic; France; Germany; Greece; Hungary; Italy; France; Netherlands; Poland; Romania	A member of the family Architectonicidae. The type species is S. anticollata; genus also includes "Solarium" carocollatum Lamarck (1822), "Solarium" simplex Bronn (1831), "Solarium" gratteloupi d'Orbigny (1852), "Solarium" stephanense Cossmann & Peyrot (1919), "Solarium" carocollatosimplex Sacco (1892) and "Architectonica" ariei Wienrich (2007).	
Siphoecphora gerrardi	Sp. nov	Valid	Petuch & Berschauer	Miocene	Pungo River Formation	United States (North Carolina)		
Skeneoides karrineae	Sp. nov	Valid	Landau, Van Dingenen & Ceulemans	Miocene		France	A species of Skeneoides.	
Solatisonax pozsgayae	Sp. nov	Valid	Kovács, Leél-Őssy & Vicián	Miocene	Pétervására Formation	Hungary	A species of Solatisonax.	
Solatisonax tavianii	Sp. nov	Valid	Harzhauser & Landau	Miocene	Dej Formation	Romania	A species of Solatisonax.	
Solatisonax? transversa	Sp. nov	Valid	Harzhauser & Landau	Miocene	Dej Formation	Hungary; Romania	Possibly a species of Solatisonax.	
Sorgenfreispira planicostata	Sp. nov	Valid	Landau, Harzhauser & Giannuzzi-Savelli	Pliocene		Spain	A species of Sorgenfreispira.	
Subepona leahae	Sp. nov	Valid	Squires & Groves	Eocene	Llajas Formation	United States (California)	A species of Subepona.	
Sulcoactaeon fallax	Sp. nov	Valid	Blagovetshenskiy	Early Cretaceous		Russia		
Sulcoactaeon gerassimovi	Sp. nov	Valid	Blagovetshenskiy	Early Cretaceous		Russia		
Sulcoactaeon insuetus	Sp. nov	Valid	Blagovetshenskiy	Early Cretaceous		Russia		
Sulcoactaeon kremenkensis	Sp. nov	Valid	Blagovetshenskiy	Early Cretaceous		Russia		
Sulcoactaeon polivnensis	Sp. nov	Valid	Blagovetshenskiy	Early Cretaceous		Russia		
Sulcoactaeon rotundus	Sp. nov	Valid	Blagovetshenskiy	Early Cretaceous		Russia		
Sulcoactaeon shumilkini	Sp. nov	Valid	Blagovetshenskiy	Early Cretaceous		Russia		
Sulcoactaeon simbirskensis	Sp. nov	Valid	Blagovetshenskiy	Early Cretaceous		Russia		
Suluspira gallica	Sp. nov	Valid	Landau, Van Dingenen & Ceulemans	Miocene		France	A species of Suluspira.	
Tacheocampylaea fornacis	Sp. nov	Valid	Esu & Girotti	Pleistocene		Italy	A species of Tacheocampylaea.	
Teiichispira teresae	Sp. nov	Valid	Bertero, Ferrari & Carrera	Ordovician	San Juan Formation	Argentina	A member of the family Macluritidae.	
Terebra golebiowskii	Sp. nov	Valid	Harzhauser & Landau	Miocene	Baden Formation	Austria	A species of Terebra.	
Terebra henkmulderi	Sp. nov	Valid	Landau & Harzhauser	Pliocene (Piacenzian)		Spain	A species of Terebra.	
Terebra praehistrio	Sp. nov	Valid	Landau & Harzhauser	Pliocene (Piacenzian)		Spain	A species of Terebra.	
Textiliomurex problematicus	Sp. nov	Valid	Lozouet	Oligocene		France	A member of the family Muricidae.	
Theodisca	Gen. et comb. nov	Junior homonym	Harzhauser, Guzhov & Landau	Miocene to Pleistocene		Austria	A member of the family Potamididae. The type species is "Cerithium" theodiscum Rolle (1856); genus also includes "Cerithium" cicur Zhizhchenko (1934), "Potamides" biseriatus Friedberg (1914), "Potamides" azerbajdjanicus K. A. Ali-Zade (1940), "Cerithium" graecum Deshayes (1832) and "Cerithium" etruscum Mayer (1864). The generic name is shared with Theodisca Müller (1858); Harzhauser, Guzhov & Landau (2025) coined a replacement name Theodiscella.	
Timbellus cailloelensis	Sp. nov	Valid	Ledon et al.	Eocene (Lutetian)		France	A species of Timbellus.	
Timbellus hesdinensis	Sp. nov	Valid	Ledon et al.	Eocene (Lutetian)		France	A species of Timbellus.	
Timbellus wozniaki	Sp. nov	Valid	Ledon et al.	Eocene (Lutetian)		France	A species of Timbellus.	
Toroidia tavianii	Sp. nov	Valid	Micali & Villari	Plio-Pleistocene		Italy		
Triphora (sensu lato) freixiensis	Sp. nov	Valid	Landau, Bakker & Marques da Silva	Pliocene	Carnide Formation	Portugal	A member of the family Triphoridae.	
Trisecphora governorensis	Sp. nov	Valid	Petuch & Berschauer	Miocene	Calvert Formation	United States (Maryland)	A species of Trisecphora.	
Trisecphora precursor	Sp. nov	Valid	Petuch & Berschauer	Miocene	Pungo River Formation	United States (North Carolina)	A species of Trisecphora.	
Trisecphora (Recurvecphora) recurvicostata	Sp. nov	Valid	Petuch & Berschauer	Miocene	Pungo River Formation	United States (North Carolina)	A species of Trisecphora.	
Tritia bagolyensis	Sp. nov	Valid	Kovács & Vicián	Miocene		Hungary	A species of Tritia.	
Tritia domonkosi	Sp. nov	Valid	Kovács & Vicián	Miocene		Hungary	A species of Tritia.	
Tritia gerdsteini	Sp. nov	Valid	Kovács & Vicián	Miocene		Hungary	A species of Tritia.	
Tritia letkesensis	Sp. nov	Valid	Kovács & Vicián	Miocene		Hungary	A species of Tritia.	
Trubatsa larratensis	Sp. nov	Valid	Lozouet	Oligocene		France	A species of Trubatsa.	
Trubatsa subaturensis	Sp. nov	Valid	Lozouet	Oligocene		France	A species of Trubatsa.	
Trubatsa trounensis	Sp. nov	Valid	Lozouet	Oligocene		France	A species of Trubatsa.	
Turbonilla landii	Sp. nov	Valid	Tabanelli et al.	Pliocene		Italy	A species of Turbonilla.	
Turbonilla peculiaris	Sp. nov	Valid	Tabanelli et al.	Pliocene		Italy	A species of Turbonilla.	
Turbonilla zangherii	Sp. nov	Valid	Tabanelli et al.	Pliocene		Italy	A species of Turbonilla.	
Turritellinella devinensis	Sp. nov	Valid	Biskupič	Miocene	Studienka Formation	Slovakia	A member of the family Turritellidae.	
Umbilia tomdarraghi	Sp. nov	Valid	Southgate & Militz	Pliocene		Australia	A species of Umbilia.	
Vermicularia katiae	Sp. nov	Valid	Anderson & Allmon	Miocene–Pliocene		Dominican Republic	A species of Vermicularia. Published online in 2024, but the issue date is listed as December 2023.	
Vexiguraleus iberoangulatus	Sp. nov	Valid	Landau, Harzhauser & Giannuzzi-Savelli	Pliocene		Spain	A member of the family Mangeliidae.	
Xamaycarene	Gen. et comb. nov	Valid	Pacaud	Late Cretaceous (Maastrichtian)	Shaw Castle Shale	Jamaica	A member of the family Areneidae. The type species is "Arene" truncatosphaera Sohl (1998).	
Xestopyrguloides ? sagitta	Sp. nov	Valid	Neubauer & Wesselingh	Pleistocene (Gelasian)	Kolankaya Formation	Turkey	A member of the family Hydrobiidae.	
Zafrona olgapirosae	Sp. nov	Valid	Kovács & Vicián	Miocene		Hungary	A species of Zafrona.	

=== Gastropod research ===
- Review of the world-wide fossil record and evolutionary history of freshwater gastropods is published by Neubauer (2023).
- A study on the biogeographic distributions of pleurotomariids throughout their evolutionary history from Maastrichtian to Holocene is published by Bose, Das & Mondal (2023).
- A study on the diversity of potamidids and batillariids in the Paratethys through time is published by Harzhauser et al. (2023), who interpret the studied groups as a whole not to be mangrove indicators, and find only members of the genera Mesohalina, Ptychopotamides, Terebralia and probably Tiarapirenella to be associated with mangroves during the Oligocene to early Middle Miocene in the Central Paratethys, while other members of the studied groups adapted to environments devoid of mangroves.
- Revision and study on the affinities of the Plio-Pleistocene turritellids from the Atlantic Coastal Plain and Florida is published by Friend et al. (2023).

== Other molluscs ==
Name	Novelty	Status	Authors	Age	Type locality	Location	Notes	Images
Agidelia	Gen. et sp. nov		Mazaev	Permian		Russia	A member of Rostroconchia belonging to the family Bransoniidae. Genus includes new species A. magnifica. Published online in 2024, but the issue date is listed as December 2023.	
Arceodomus fredericksi	Sp. nov	Valid	Mazaev	Permian		Russia	A member of Rostroconchia. Published online in 2024, but the issue date is listed as December 2023.	
Ashaconcha	Gen. et sp. nov		Mazaev	Permian		Russia	A member of Rostroconchia belonging to the family Bransoniidae. Genus includes new species A. rara. Published online in 2024, but the issue date is listed as December 2023.	
Celtopileus	Gen. et sp. nov	Valid	Cope & Ebbestad	Ordovician (Floian)	Ogof Hen Formation	United Kingdom	A member of Tergomya belonging to the group Kirengellida and possibly to the family Hypseloconidae. The type species is C. calvapex.	
Costulaconus	Gen. et sp. nov	Valid	Cope & Ebbestad	Ordovician (Floian)	Ogof Hen Formation	United Kingdom	A member of Tergomya belonging to the group Kirengellida and possibly to the family Hypseloconidae. The type species is C. mirificus.	
Eotebenna danica	Sp. nov	Valid	Peel & Berg-Madsen	Cambrian (Drumian and Guzhangian)	Andrarum Limestone	Denmark; Sweden	A member of Helcionelloida belonging to the family Yochelcionellidae.	
Hensoniconus	Gen. et comb. nov	Valid	Peel	Cambrian (Wuliuan)	Henson Gletscher Formation	Greenland	A member of Helcionelloida. The type species is Scenella? siku Peel & Kouchinsky (2022).	
Hoarepora uralica	Sp. nov		Mazaev	Permian		Russia	A member of Rostroconchia belonging to the family Bransoniidae. Published online in 2024, but the issue date is listed as December 2023.	
Incisiochiton pustulifer	Sp. nov	Valid	Sirenko & Dell'Angelo	Paleocene	Luzanovka Beds	Ukraine	A chiton belonging to the family Schizochitonidae.	
Proplina areniga	Sp. nov	Valid	Cope & Ebbestad	Ordovician (Floian)	Ogof Hen Formation	United Kingdom	A member of Tergomya belonging to the group Tryblidiida and to the family Proplinidae.	
Proplina? obtusa	Sp. nov	Valid	Cope & Ebbestad	Ordovician (Floian)	Ogof Hen Formation	United Kingdom	A member of Tergomya belonging to the group Tryblidiida and to the family Proplinidae.	

=== Other mollusc research ===
- Qiang et al. (2023) describe new fossil material of Anabarella plana from the Cambrian Yanjiahe Formation (China), and consider A. plana to be the only member of the genus Anabarella definitely present in South China.

== General research ==
- Slater (2023) describes microscopic molluscan radulae from the Cambrian (Wuliuan) Borgholm Formation (Sweden), similar to the radulae of extant gastropods specialized for piercing and sucking the tissues of green algae, and interpret this finding as indicating that this form of herbivory was already present among Cambrian molluscs.
- Fossil material representing the first evidence of gastropod drilling predation on molluscan prey from Coniacian is reported from the Anaipadi Member of the Garudamangalam Formation (India) by Mukhopadhyay et al. (2023).
- A diverse molluscan assemblage dominated by turritellid gastropods from Kachchh (India), originally interpreted as Late Jurassic in age, is reinterpreted as more likely Miocene in age by Fürsich et al. (2023).
