= Araneites =

Scientific classification
- Kingdom: Animalia
- Phylum: Mollusca
- Class: Cephalopoda
- Subclass: †Ammonoidea
- Order: †Goniatitida
- Family: †Sporadoceratidae
- Subfamily: †Sporadoceratinae
- Genus: †Araneites

Genus of molluscs (fossil)

Araneites is a genus belonging to the Sporadoceratinae subfamily of the Prionoceratidae family, a member of the Goniatitida order. They are an extinct group of ammonoid, which are shelled cephalopods related to squids, belemnites, octopuses, and cuttlefish, and more distantly to the nautiloids.
