= Algerites =

Algerites Temporal range: Cenomanian

Scientific classification
- Kingdom: Animalia
- Phylum: Mollusca
- Class: Cephalopoda
- Subclass: †Ammonoidea
- Order: †Ammonitida
- Suborder: †Ancyloceratina
- Family: †Anisoceratidae
- Genus: †Algerites; Pervinquiere, 1910

Genus of molluscs (fossil)

Algerites is middle Cretaceous (Cenomanian) anisoceratid ammonoid with a close-coiled adult shell in which the whorls at that stage are in close contact, after starting off with openly coiled whorls, and in which every rib (a character of the family) has a pair of sharp ventral tubercles.

Algerites, which is found in North Africa, named for the country of Algeria, is thought to be derived from Idiohammites, also an anisoceratid. It (Algerites) differs from Allocrioceras in that the later whorls come together in close contact whereas in the latter they remain apart.

The Anisoceratidae to which this genus is assigned is included in the diverse heteromorphic superfamily Turrilitoidea.
