= Sorgenfreispira moronii =

Scientific classification
- Kingdom: Animalia
- Phylum: Mollusca
- Class: Gastropoda
- Subclass: Caenogastropoda
- Order: Neogastropoda
- Superfamily: Conoidea
- Family: Mangeliidae
- Genus: Sorgenfreispira
- Species: S. moronii

Binomial name
- Sorgenfreispira moronii (Venzo & Pelosio, 1964)

Synonyms
- Cythara (Mangelia) moronii Venzo & Pelosio, 1964 (original combination)

Extinct species of gastropod

Sorgenfreispira moronii is an extinct species of sea snail, a marine gastropod mollusk in the family Mangeliidae.

== Description ==
The species in undoubtedly related to Bela exilis.

== Distribution ==
This extinct species was found in Miocene strata in Italy.
