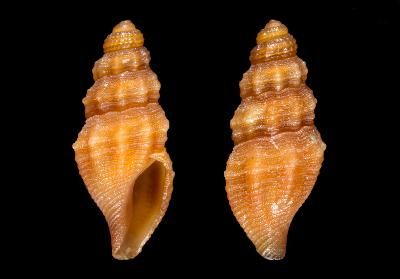
- Shell of Sorgenfreispira ardovinii (holotype at MNHN, Paris)

Scientific classification
- Kingdom: Animalia
- Phylum: Mollusca
- Class: Gastropoda
- Subclass: Caenogastropoda
- Order: Neogastropoda
- Superfamily: Conoidea
- Family: Mangeliidae
- Genus: Sorgenfreispira
- Species: S. ardovinii

Binomial name
- Sorgenfreispira ardovinii (Mariottini & Oliverio, 2008)

Synonyms
- Bela ardovinii Mariottini & Oliverio, 2008 (original combination)

= Sorgenfreispira ardovinii =

Species of gastropod

Sorgenfreispira ardovinii is a species of sea snail, a marine gastropod mollusk in the family Mangeliidae.

== Description ==
The length of the shell attains 3.7 mm, its diameter 1.4 mm.

== Distribution ==
This marine species occurs in the Atlantic Ocean off Senegal.
