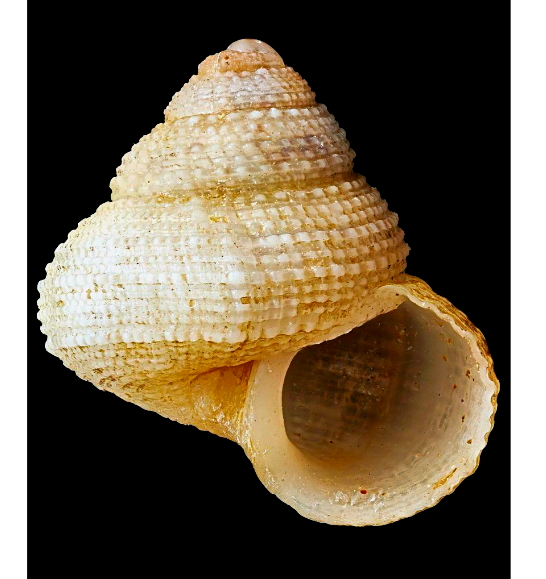
- Shell of Heliacus asteleformis (specimen at the Auckland War Memorial Museum)

Scientific classification
- Kingdom: Animalia
- Phylum: Mollusca
- Class: Gastropoda
- Family: Architectonicidae
- Genus: Heliacus
- Species: H. asteleformis

Binomial name
- Heliacus asteleformis Powell, 1965

Synonyms
- Gyriscus asteleformis A. W. B. Powell, 1965 (superseded combination); Gyriscus hayashii Shikama, 1970 (junior subjective synonym); Heliacus (Gyriscus) asteleformis (A. W. B. Powell, 1965) alternative representation

= Heliacus asteleformis =

Species of gastropod

Heliacus asteleformis is a species of sea snail, a marine gastropod mollusk in the family Architectonicidae, known as the staircase shells or sundials.

== Distribution ==
This species is endemic to New Zealand, found between the northern tip of the North Island and the Three Kings Islands.

== Habitat ==
This species is found at depths of about 90 m.

== Description ==
The shell height is up to 8 mm, and the width is up to 7.5 mm.
