= Praeglyphioceratidae =

Scientific classification
- Kingdom: Animalia
- Phylum: Mollusca
- Class: Cephalopoda
- Subclass: †Ammonoidea
- Order: †Goniatitida
- Superfamily: †Prionoceratoidea
- Family: †Praeglyphioceratidae; Ruzhencev 1957

Genera
- Lagowites; Praeglyphioceras

Praeglyphioceratidae is one of seven families of the Prionocerataceae families, a member of the Goniatitida order. They are an extinct group of ammonoid, which are shelled cephalopods related to squids, belemnites, octopuses, and cuttlefish, and more distantly to the nautiloids.
