= Heliacus enoshimensis =

- Shell and operculum of Heliacus enoshimensis

Scientific classification
- Kingdom: Animalia
- Phylum: Mollusca
- Class: Gastropoda
- Family: Architectonicidae
- Genus: Heliacus
- Species: H. enoshimensis

Binomial name
- Heliacus enoshimensis (Melvill, 1891)

Synonyms
- Heliacus (Torinista) enoshimensis (Melvill, 1891) · alternative representation; Solarium (Torinia) enoshimense Melvill, 1891 · unaccepted > superseded combination; Torinia densegranosa Pilsbry, 1905

Species of gastropod

Heliacus enoshimensis is a species of sea snail, a marine gastropod mollusk in the family Architectonicidae, known as the staircase shells or sundials.

== Distribution ==
This marine species is endemic to Japan.

== Description ==
The shell height is up to 5 mm, and the width is up to 8.5 mm.

(Described as Torinia densegranosa ) The shell is rather openly umbilicate and depressed-conical. It is dull light reddish brown, with some indistinct darker and yellowish spots along the periphery. The spire is low-conical, and the apex is obtuse. There are 5½ slightly convex whorls; the body whorl is rounded peripherally.

The sculpture consists of unequal, flattened spiral cords and threads, which are cut by very fine, close, and regular radial grooves. The cords are rather broad and flat, except near the periphery, where two or three are convex and slightly prominent.

Four spiral cords are visible on the upper surface, with a thread between the third and fourth cords. On the periphery, there are two cords, with a thread between them. On the base, there are five cords: the outermost is smaller and has a thread on each side; the umbilical cord is coarsely crenate; and the next outermost cord has only about half as many radial incisions as the following cords. A fine, not very distinct spiral striation is superimposed on the coarser sculpture described above.

The aperture is notched at the termination of the umbilical cord. The operculum is a conical stack of thin, yellow lamellae.
