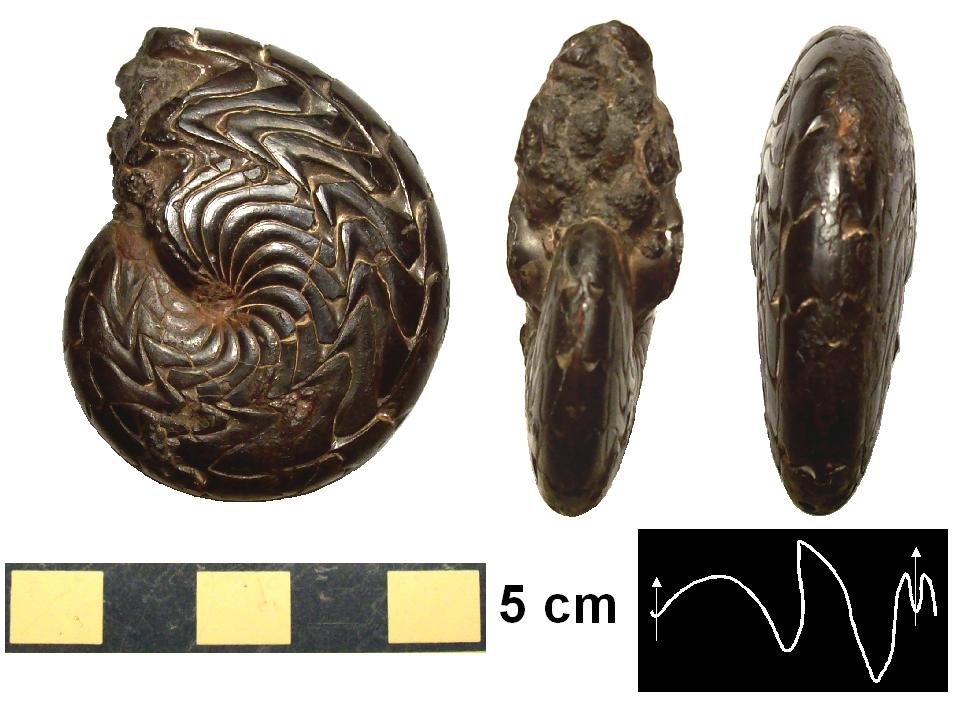
- Sporadoceras Devonian

Scientific classification
- Kingdom: Animalia
- Phylum: Mollusca
- Class: Cephalopoda
- Subclass: †Ammonoidea
- Order: †Goniatitida
- Family: †Sporadoceratidae
- Subfamily: †Sporadoceratinae; Bartzsch & Weyer, 1988

Genera
- Araneites; Enkebergoceras; Felisporadocera; Iranoceras; Maeneceras; Nothosporadocera; Sporadoceras; Umbosporadoceras

= Sporadoceratinae =

Sporadoceratinae is one of two subfamilies of the Sporadoceratidae family, a member of the Goniatitida order. It is an extinct group of ammonoid, which are shelled cephalopods related to squids, belemnites, octopuses and cuttlefish, and more distantly to the nautiloids.
