= Zadelsdorfia =

Scientific classification
- Kingdom: Animalia
- Phylum: Mollusca
- Class: Cephalopoda
- Subclass: †Ammonoidea
- Order: †Goniatitida
- Family: †Gattendorfiidae
- Subfamily: †Gattendorfiinae
- Genus: †Zadelsdorfia; Weyer, 1972

Genus of molluscs (fossil)

Zadelsdorfia is an extinct genus belonging to the Gattendorfiinae subfamily, a member of the Goniatitida order. They are an extinct group of ammonoid, which are shelled cephalopods related to squids, belemnites, octopuses, and cuttlefish, and more distantly to the nautiloids.
