= Sorgenfreispira exilis =

Scientific classification
- Kingdom: Animalia
- Phylum: Mollusca
- Class: Gastropoda
- Subclass: Caenogastropoda
- Order: Neogastropoda
- Superfamily: Conoidea
- Family: Mangeliidae
- Genus: Sorgenfreispira
- Species: S. exilis

Binomial name
- Sorgenfreispira exilis (Ardovini, 2004)

Synonyms
- Bela exilis Ardovini, 2004 (original combination)

Species of gastropod

Sorgenfreispira exilis is a species of sea snail, a marine gastropod mollusk in the family Mangeliidae.

== Description ==
The length of the shell attains 3.6 mm, its diameter 1.5 mm. The shell of Sorgenfreispira exilis has a unique shape and structure, contributing to its overall appearance.

The shell is typically smooth and glossy, with a slender and elongated form. It often tapers gradually towards the apex, creating a pointed or conical shape. The whorls of the shell are tightly coiled, forming a spiral pattern. The overall coloration of the shell can vary, but it is commonly found in shades of white, cream, or pale yellow, sometimes with subtle patterns or markings.

== Distribution ==
This marine species occurs in the Atlantic Ocean from Morocco to Angola.
