= Sorgenfreispira nitida =

Scientific classification
- Kingdom: Animalia
- Phylum: Mollusca
- Class: Gastropoda
- Subclass: Caenogastropoda
- Order: Neogastropoda
- Superfamily: Conoidea
- Family: Mangeliidae
- Genus: Sorgenfreispira
- Species: S. nitida

Binomial name
- Sorgenfreispira nitida Pavia, 1976

Synonyms
- † Bela (Bela) nitida Pavia, 1975 (basionym); † Bela nitida Pavia, 1975·

Extinct species of gastropod

Sorgenfreispira nitida is an extinct species of sea snail, a marine gastropod mollusk in the family Mangeliidae.

== Distribution ==
This extinct marine species was found in Pleistocene strata in Italy.
