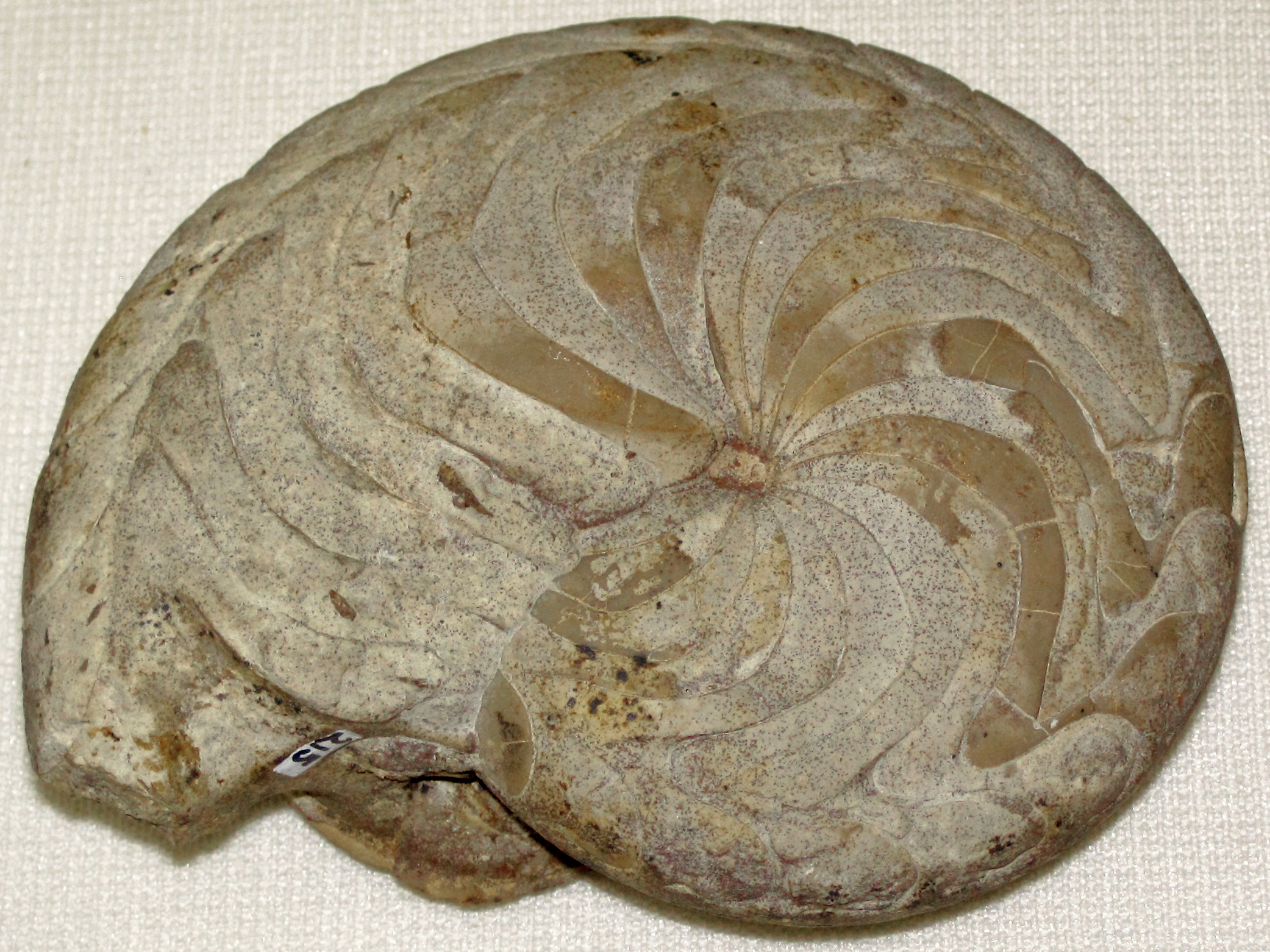
- The prionoceratid Imitoceras rotatorium (early Carboniferous)

Scientific classification
- Kingdom: Animalia
- Phylum: Mollusca
- Class: Cephalopoda
- Subclass: †Ammonoidea
- Order: †Goniatitida
- Suborder: †Tornoceratina
- Superfamily: †Prionoceratoidea; Hyatt, 1884

Families
- Gattendorfiidae; Prionoceratidae; Pseudarietitidae; Voehringeritidae

Synonyms
- Prionocerataceae

= Prionoceratoidea =

Prionoceratoidea Temporal range: Upper Devonian - Upper Permian

Extinct superfamily of molluscs

Prionoceratoidea is a superfamily in the goniatitid suborder, Tornoceratina that was extant during the latter Paleozoic.

The inclusive taxonomy of the Prionoceratoidea varies according to classification. In some, valid families are the Gattendorfiidae, Prionoceratidae, Pseudarietitidae, and Voehringeritidae. Others may add the Acrocanitidae, Cheiloceratidae, Praeglyphioceratidae, and Sporadoceratidae to the list although it is not at all clear that these belong.
