= Sorgenfreispira scalariformis =

Scientific classification
- Kingdom: Animalia
- Phylum: Mollusca
- Class: Gastropoda
- Subclass: Caenogastropoda
- Order: Neogastropoda
- Superfamily: Conoidea
- Family: Mangeliidae
- Genus: Sorgenfreispira
- Species: S. scalariformis

Binomial name
- Sorgenfreispira scalariformis (Brugnone, 1862)

Synonyms
- † Bela scalariformis (Brugnone, 1862); † Pleurotoma scalariforme Brugnone, 1862 (original combination)

Extinct species of gastropod

Sorgenfreispira scalariformis is an extinct species of sea snail, a marine gastropod mollusk in the family Mangeliidae.

== Distribution ==
This extinct marine species was found in Pleistocene strata in Italy.
