= Anisoceratidae =

Anisoceratidae Temporal range: Albian–Turonian

Scientific classification
- Kingdom: Animalia
- Phylum: Mollusca
- Class: Cephalopoda
- Subclass: †Ammonoidea
- Order: †Ammonitida
- Suborder: †Ancyloceratina
- Superfamily: †Turrilitoidea
- Family: †Anisoceratidae; Hyatt, 1900

Genera
- Algerites; Allocrioceras; Anisoceras; Idiohamites; Mosirites; Ndumuiceras; Phlycticrioceras; Protanisoceras; Tarrantites

Extinct family of ammonites

Anisoceratidae is an extinct family of heteromorph ammonites which belong to the Ancyloceratina superfamily Turrilitoidea. Members of the family range is from the lower Albian to the upper Turonian. The family is possibly derived from a member of the Hamitidae.

== Morphology ==
Anisoceratid shells begin as an irregular helical spiral which typically becomes confined to a single plane with growth. This is usually followed by at least a single straight shaft. Ribs and tubercles are common features.

== History and classification ==
Older classifications, since first publication of Part L of the Treatise on Invertebrate Paleontology, include the Anisoceratidae in the suborder Ancyloceratina (within the Turrilitoidea). Subsequent study, e.g. Beznosov & Mikhailova 1983, has suggested that the Turrilitoidea, including the Anisoceratidae, have a different phylogeny from the true Ancyloceratina, resulting in their occasional reassignment to a separate suborder, the Turrilitina, however this classification is not widely followed.
