= Mosirites =

Mosirites Temporal range: Upper Albian to Lower Cenomanian, 105–99.7 Ma

Scientific classification
- Kingdom: Animalia
- Phylum: Mollusca
- Class: Cephalopoda
- Subclass: †Ammonoidea
- Order: †Ammonitida
- Suborder: †Ancyloceratina
- Family: †Anisoceratidae
- Genus: †Mosirites; Shigeta et al., 2023

Type species
- †Mosirites mirabilis Shigeta et al., 2023

Species
- †M. mirabilis Shigeta et al., 2023; †M. serpentiformis Shigeta et al., 2023

Genus of anisoceratid ammonite from the Upper Albian to Lower Cenomanian

Mosirites is a genus of anisoceratid ammonite from Hobetsu in Hokkaido; North Japan. The type species is Mosirites mirabilis, known from multiple partial and complete specimens.

== Description ==
Mosirites is known from multiple specimens which were described in 2023 by Shigeta et al., (2023). The holotype, HMG-2412 has a maximum diameter of 325 mm (12.8 in), and consists of a phragmocone and a part of the body chamber with length of about 150°.

== Etymology ==
The generic name, Mosirites, is derived from the Ainu word for peaceful land or Hokkaido, and the suffix "-ites" which is common in ammonite genera. The type species' specific name, mirabilis, is a Latin word for amazing, and refers to its amazing and wonderful form. The second species' specific name, serpentiformis, derives from the Latin words 'serpens' and 'forma' and refers to its snake-like form.
