= Middle Maastrichtian Event =

The Middle Maastrichtian Event (MME) was a climatic perturbation that occurred during the Maastrichtian stage of the Late Cretaceous epoch. The event featured global drying, warming, and changes to ocean circulation and chemistry.

== Timeline ==
The MME occurred approximately 69.5 Ma.

== Causes ==
The MME is believed to have been caused by increased volcanic CO_{2} emissions.

== Effects ==
In central Alaska, mean annual precipitation (MAP) precipitously declined; it was 353–1050 mm before the MME and 475–1451 mm after the MME but only 168–470 mm during the MME.

The combination of global warming, ocean circulation disruption, ocean acidification, and toxic metal influx caused the extinction of inoceramid bivalves. In northwestern Europe, benthic foraminiferal assemblages remained relatively unchanged.
