= Alvania praetermissa =

Scientific classification
- Kingdom: Animalia
- Phylum: Mollusca
- Class: Gastropoda
- Subclass: Caenogastropoda
- Order: Littorinimorpha
- Superfamily: Rissooidea
- Family: Rissoidae
- Genus: Alvania
- Species: †A. praetermissa

Binomial name
- †Alvania praetermissa Landau, Van Dingenen & Ceulemans, 2023

Species of gastropod

Alvania praetermissa is an extinct species of minute sea snail, a marine gastropod mollusk or micromollusk in the family Rissoidae.

== Distribution ==
Fossils have been found in Upper Miocene strata in northwestern France.
