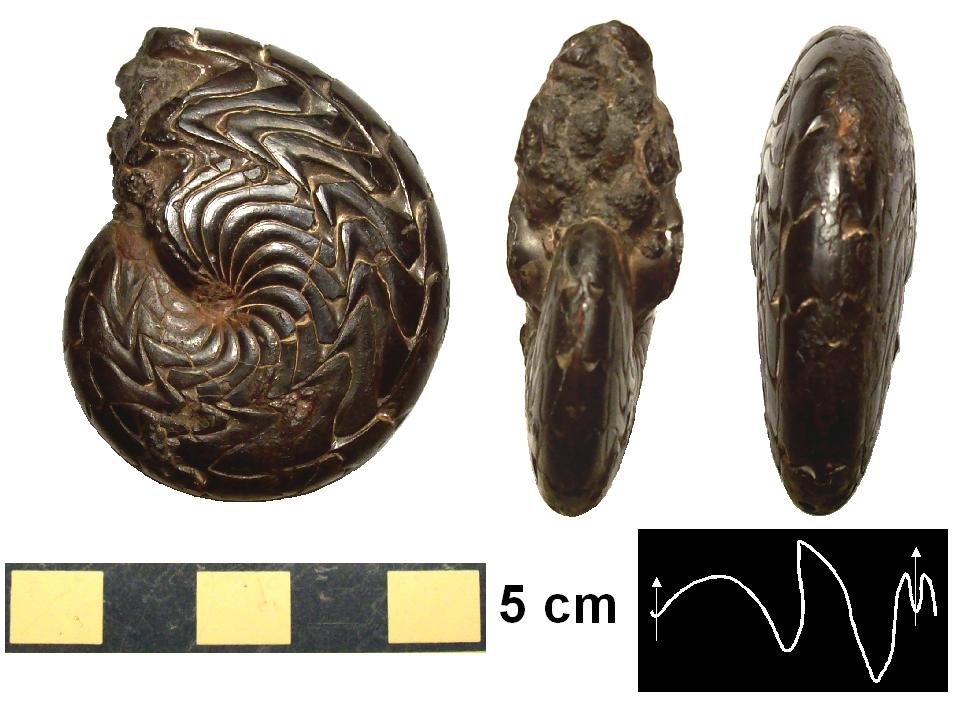
- Sporadoceras specimen. A goniatite from devonian of Morocco.

Scientific classification
- Kingdom: Animalia
- Phylum: Mollusca
- Class: Cephalopoda
- Subclass: †Ammonoidea
- Order: †Goniatitida
- Superfamily: †Prionoceratoidea
- Family: †Sporadoceratidae; Korn et al., 2003

Subfamilies
- Sporadoceratinae; Xenoporadoceratinae

= Sporadoceratidae =

Sporadoceratidae is one of seven families of the Prionoceratoidea superfamily, a member of the Goniatitida order. They are an extinct group of ammonoid, which are shelled cephalopods related to squids, belemnites, octopuses, and cuttlefish, and more distantly to the nautiloids.
