= Pseudarietitinae =

Scientific classification
- Kingdom: Animalia
- Phylum: Mollusca
- Class: Cephalopoda
- Subclass: †Ammonoidea
- Order: †Goniatitida
- Family: †Gattendorfiidae
- Subfamily: †Pseudarietitinae; Bartzsch & Weyer, 1987

Genera
- Paprothites; Paralytoceras; Pseudarietites

Extinct subfamily of molluscs

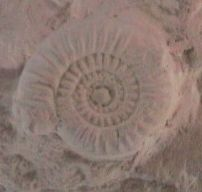
Pseudarietites fossil

Pseudarietitinae is one of two subfamilies of the family Gattendorfiidae, a member of the Goniatitida order. They are an extinct group of ammonoid, which are shelled cephalopods related to squids, belemnites, octopuses, and cuttlefish, and more distantly to the nautiloids.
