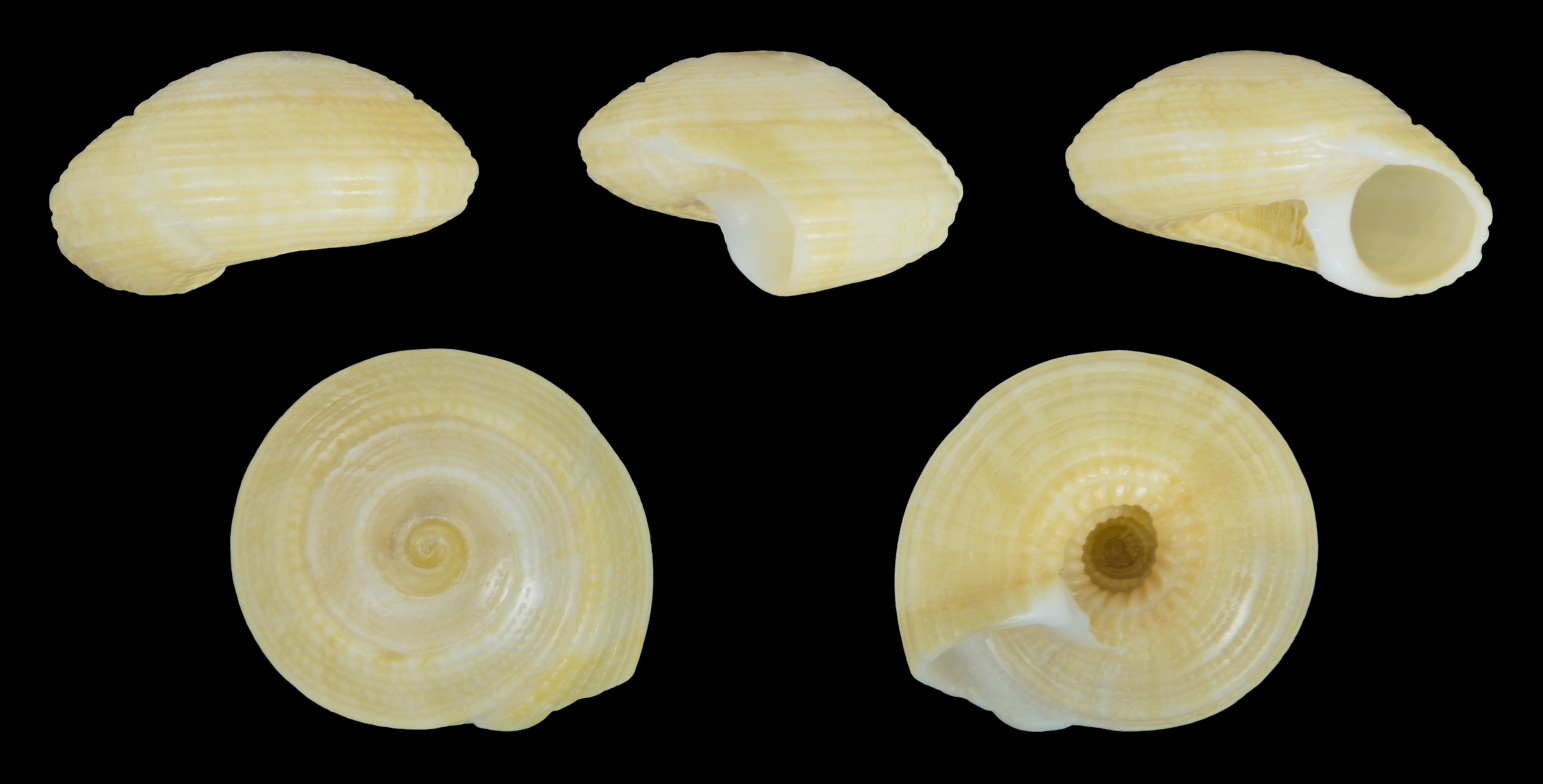
- Shell of Heliacus fallaciosus

Scientific classification
- Kingdom: Animalia
- Phylum: Mollusca
- Class: Gastropoda
- Family: Architectonicidae
- Genus: Heliacus d'Orbigny, 1842

Type species
- Solarium herberti Deshayes, 1830

Synonyms
- Astronacus Woodring, 1959 (junior subjective synonym); Grandeliacus Iredale, 1957; Gyriscus Tiberi, 1867; Heliacus (Astronacus) Woodring, 1959 junior subjective synonym; Heliacus (Grandeliacus) Iredale, 1957 alternative representation; Heliacus (Gyriscus) Tiberi, 1867 alternative representation; Heliacus (Heliacus) A. d'Orbigny, 1842 alternative representation; Heliacus (Pyrgoheliacus) Bieler, 1987 alternative representation; Heliacus (Teretropoma) Rochebrune, 1881 alternative representation; Heliacus (Torinista) Iredale, 1936 alternative representation; Solarium (Torinia) J. E. Gray, 1842 junior subjective synonym; Teretropoma Rochebrune, 1881; Torinia J. E. Gray, 1842 (name suppressed (Opinion 2185, ICZN)); Torinia (Torinia) J. E. Gray, 1842; Torinista Iredale, 1936; Tornista Iredale, 1936 misspelling - incorrect subsequent spelling (Error for Torinista); Tornista [sic] · (Error for Torinia Gray, 1842); Trochus (Heliacus) A. d'Orbigny, 1842 (superseded combination)

= Heliacus =

Genus of sea snails

Heliacus is a genus of gastropods belonging to the family Architectonicidae.

== General characteristics ==
(Original description in French) The operculum is corneous and conical, increasing in diameter from the apex to the base; its inner side is smooth with a central point; all the rest is composed of spirally coiled lamellae which decrease in diameter and are always fringed at their circumference. The shell is usually higher than the other sundials, with a narrower umbilicus.

(Described as Gyriscus in Latin) The shell is turbinate, conico-turreted, and umbilicate; the apex is blunt, with the tip involuted; the whorls are rounded and transversely girdled; the aperture is subcircular, with the margins sharp and joined by a callus, the columellar lip being reflected. The operculum is corneous (horny), multispiral on the upper part, and provided with a stylet-like process on the lower part.

== Distribution ==
The Heliacus species are typically found in warm-temperate to tropical waters globally, from the intertidal zone down to the subtidal and occasionally deeper.

== Species ==
- † Heliacus albertinae (Sacco, 1892)
- Heliacus anaglyptus Woodring, 1959
- † Heliacus angularis Makiyama, 1927
- † Heliacus antu S. N. Nielsen & Frassinetti, 2007
- Heliacus areola (Gmelin, 1791)
- Heliacus asteleformis (Powell, 1965)
- † Heliacus bahamondei Frassinetti & Covacevich, 1981
- †Heliacus berthae (O. Boettger, 1902)
- Heliacus bisulcatus (d'Orbigny, 1842)
- Heliacus caelatus (Hinds, 1844)
- Heliacus cerdaleus (Melvill & Standen, 1903)
- † Heliacus chonos S. N. Nielsen & Frassinetti, 2007
- Heliacus corallinus Garrard, 1978
- Heliacus costatus (Schepman, 1909)
- Heliacus cylindricus (Gmelin, 1791)
- † Heliacus darraghi Garrard, 1978
- † Heliacus deningeri (K. Martin, 1914)
- Heliacus discoideus (Pease, 1868)
- Heliacus enoshimensis (Melvill, 1891)
- Heliacus fallaciosus (Tiberi, 1872)
- Heliacus fenestratus (Hinds, 1844)
- Heliacus geminus Bieler, 1993
- † Heliacus globosus Harzhauser & Landau, 2023
- Heliacus hyperionis Bieler, 1993
- Heliacus imperfectus Suter, 1917
- Heliacus implexus (Mighels, 1845)
- Heliacus infundibuliformis (Gmelin, 1791)
- Heliacus jeffreysianus (Tiberi, 1867)
- † Heliacus lowei Durham, 1950
- Heliacus madurensis (Schepman, 1909)
- Heliacus malani (Dautzenberg, 1910)
- Heliacus mazatlanicus Pilsbry & H.N.Lowe, 1932
- Heliacus mighelsi (Philippi, 1853)
- Heliacus miser (Dujardin, 1837)
- † Heliacus morningtonensis Garrard, 1978
- Heliacus nereidis Bieler, 1993
- Heliacus oceanitis Bieler, 1993
- † Heliacus otwayanus Garrard, 1978
- Heliacus otwayanus Garrard, 1978
- Heliacus planispira Pilsbry & H.N.Lowe, 1932
- Heliacus ponderi Garrard, 1978
- Heliacus proteus Bieler, 1993
- † Heliacus radiatus (Borson, 1821)
- † Heliacus reticulatus Dockery, 1993
- † Heliacus robertsae Durham, 1950
- Heliacus reticulatus Dockery, 1993
- Heliacus rotula Kilburn, 1975
- Heliacus splendidus Poppe & Tagaro, 2026
- † Heliacus stefanmeszarosi Biskupič, 2024
- Heliacus sterkii (Pilsbry & Vanatta, 1908)
- Heliacus stramineus (Gmelin, 1791)
- † Heliacus taverai Frassinetti & Covacevich, 1981
- Heliacus trochoides (Deshayes, 1830)
- Heliacus turritus Bieler, 1987
- Heliacus variegatus (Gmelin, 1791)
- Heliacus verdensis Bieler, 1984
- Heliacus virgatus (Hinds, 1844)
- † Heliacus wannonensis (Tenison Woods, 1879)
- Heliacus willianseverii Tenório, Barros, Francisco & Silva, 2011
- Heliacus worsfoldi Quinn, 1981
