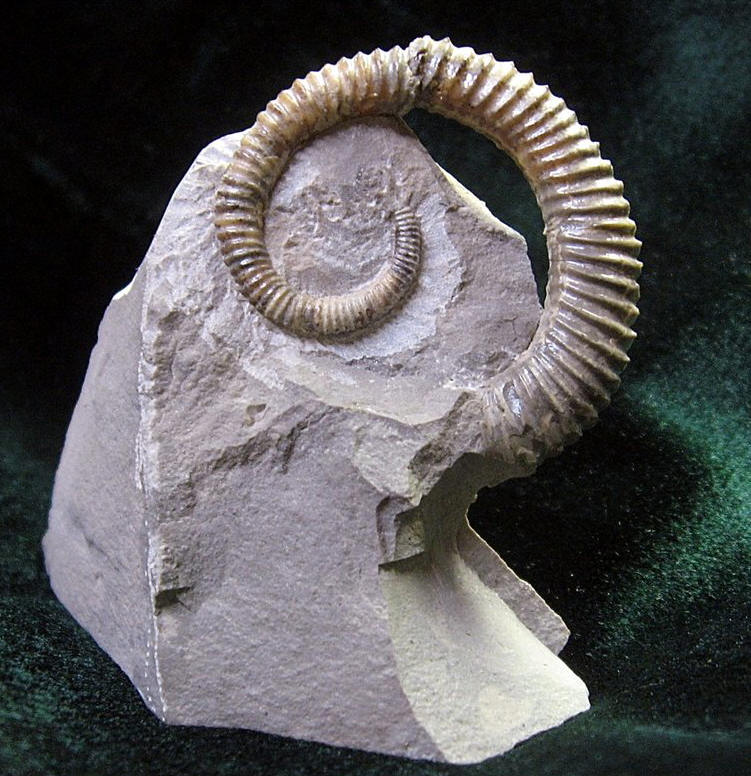
- Fossil A. pariense from Utah

Scientific classification
- Domain: Eukaryota
- Kingdom: Animalia
- Phylum: Mollusca
- Class: Cephalopoda
- Subclass: †Ammonoidea
- Order: †Ammonitida
- Suborder: †Ancyloceratina
- Family: †Anisoceratidae
- Genus: †Allocrioceras; Spath, 1926

Species
- A. angustum; A. annulatum; A. billinghursti; A. burckhardti; A. cuvieri; A. dentonense; A. hazzardi; A. larvatum; A. nodiger; A. pariense

= Allocrioceras =

Allocrioceras Temporal range: Turonian-Santonian ~94–85 Ma

Genus of molluscs (fossil)

Allocrioceras is an ammonoid cephalopod from the Turonian to Santonian stages of the Late Cretaceous, included in the turrilitoid family Anisoceratidae. Its shell is strongly ribbed and is in the form of a widely open spiral.

== Classification ==
After its 1907 discovery, the species A. hazzardi was erroneously classified as Crioceras latus by Udden. A later 1928 revision by Adkins removed it from the species C. latus while keeping it as a member of the genus Crioceras. In 1963, Young gave the species its final classification in a new genus, Allocrioceras, originally defined by Spath in 1926.

== Biology ==
Allocrioceras was small compared to some Ammonites. Its shell diameter was only a bit larger than an U.S. quarter. Unlike most Ammonites its shell was partially uncoiled. Ammonites like this, with shell configurations differing from the typical tightly coiled spiral, are called heteromorphs. It lived approximately 88 million years before present during the Turonian stage Cretaceous Period in what is now Texas. Its fossils can be found in the limestones of Brewster and Terrel counties.

Its stomach contents and some soft parts have been preserved in a fossil specimen of the species A. cf. annulatum found in the Sannine Formation of Lebanon, which show it preyed on comatulid crinoids and was a pelagic, aperture-upwards drifter.

== Distribution ==
Fossils of Allocrioceras have been found in Colombia (Loma Gorda Formation, Aipe, Huila), France, Germany, Lebanon, South Africa, Ukraine, the United Kingdom, and the United States (Arizona, Montana, New Mexico, Texas, Utah).
