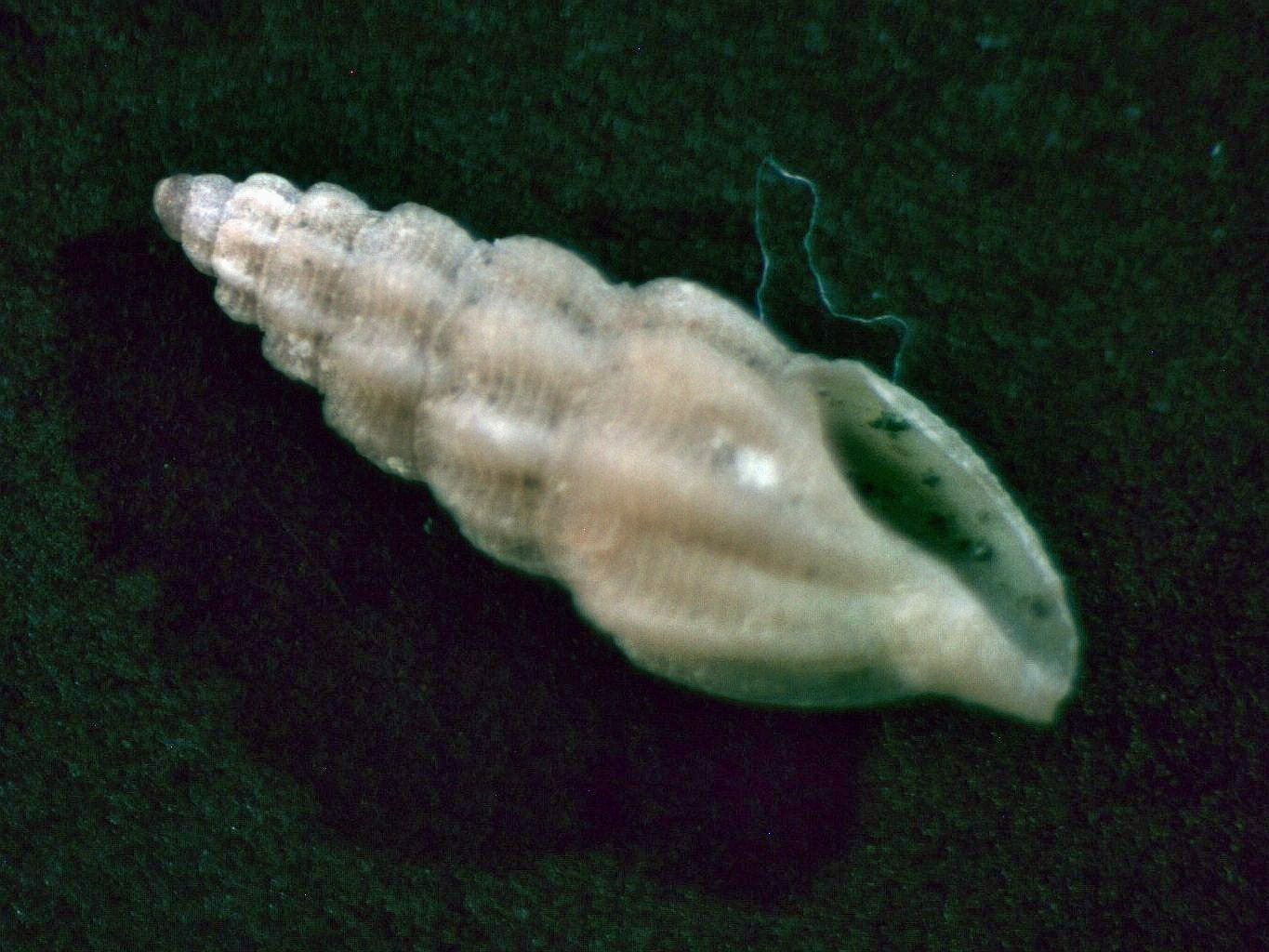
- Shell of Sorgenfreispira brachystoma

Scientific classification
- Kingdom: Animalia
- Phylum: Mollusca
- Class: Gastropoda
- Subclass: Caenogastropoda
- Order: Neogastropoda
- Superfamily: Conoidea
- Family: Mangeliidae
- Genus: Sorgenfreispira; Moroni, 1979

Type species
- Cythara (Mangelia) moronii Venzo & Pelosio, 1964

Species
- See text

= Sorgenfreispira =

Genus of gastropods

Sorgenfreispira is a genus of sea snails, marine gastropod mollusks in the family Mangeliidae.

== Species ==
Species within the genus Sorgenfreispira include:

- Sorgenfreispira africana (Ardovini, 2004)
- Sorgenfreispira ardovinii (Mariottini & Oliverio, 2008)
- Sorgenfreispira brachystoma (Philippi, 1844)
- † Sorgenfreispira calais (Kautsky, 1925)
- Sorgenfreispira exilis (Ardovini, 2004)
- † Sorgenfreispira moronii (Venzo & Pelosio, 1964)
- † Sorgenfreispira nitida (Pavia, 1975)
- † Sorgenfreispira plicatelloides (Nordsieck, 1972)
- † Sorgenfreispira pseudoexilis (Della Bella, Naldi & Scarponi, 2015)
- † Sorgenfreispira scalariformis (Brugnone, 1862)
- † Sorgenfreispira sorgenfreii (Nordsieck, 1972)
- † Sorgenfreispira tenella (Mayer, 1859)
