= Anisoceras =

Anisoceras Temporal range: Late Albian - Late Coniacian

Scientific classification
- Domain: Eukaryota
- Kingdom: Animalia
- Phylum: Mollusca
- Class: Cephalopoda
- Subclass: †Ammonoidea
- Order: †Ammonitida
- Suborder: †Ancyloceratina
- Family: †Anisoceratidae
- Genus: †Anisoceras; Pictet, 1854

Genus of molluscs (fossil)

Anisoceras is a heteromorph ammonite belonging to the turrilitoid family Anisoceratidae. The shell forms a loose open helical spiral in the early stages, ending in one or two straight shafts in the mature adult. Surface ornament consists of prominent rounded nodes on the lower and upper flanks, connected by strong looped ribs. The nodes may have been the bases of long sharp spines.
