= Gattendorfiidae =

Scientific classification
- Kingdom: Animalia
- Phylum: Mollusca
- Class: Cephalopoda
- Subclass: †Ammonoidea
- Order: †Goniatitida
- Superfamily: †Prionoceratoidea
- Family: †Gattendorfiidae; Bartzsch & Weyer, 1987

Subfamilies
- Gattendorfiinae; Pseudarietitinae

Extinct family of molluscs

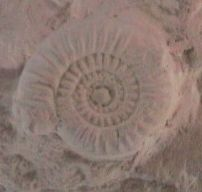
A fossil of Pseudarietites from Dzikowiec, Poland.

Gattendorfiidae is one of seven families of the superfamily Prionoceratoidea, a member of the Goniatitida order. They are an extinct group of ammonoid, which are shelled cephalopods related to squids, belemnites, octopuses, and cuttlefish, and more distantly to the nautiloids.
