= List of the Mesozoic life of Alaska =

This list of the Mesozoic life of Alaska contains the various prehistoric life-forms whose fossilized remains have been reported from within the US state of Alaska and are between 252.17 and 66 million years of age.

== A ==
- Acila
- †Actinoceramus
  - †Actinoceramus concentricus
  - †Actinoceramus sulcatus
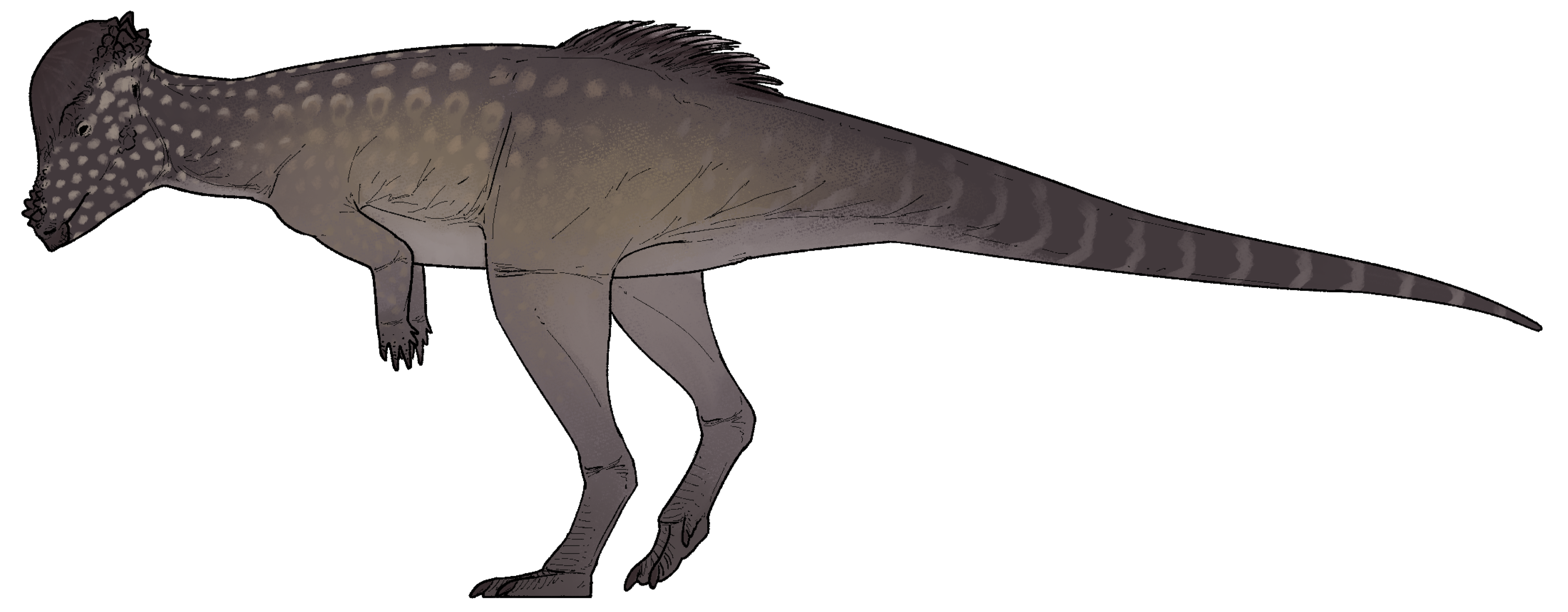
- Life restoration of the Late Cretaceous dome-headed dinosaur Alaskacephale
  †Alaskacephale – type locality for genus
  - †Alaskacephale gangloffi – type locality for species
- †Allocotidus – type locality for genus
  - †Allocotidus bruesi – type locality for species
- †Alpinophyllia
  - †Alpinophyllia flexuosa
- †Amaltheus
- †Amblydactylus
- †Amblysiphonella
- †Amoeboceras
- †Ampakabastraea
  - †Ampakabastraea cowichanensis
  - †Ampakabastraea nodosa – or unidentified comparable form
- Amusium
- †Anagaudryceras
  - †Anagaudryceras auranium
  - †Anagaudryceras aurarium
  - †Anagaudryceras inflatus
  - †Anagaudryceras sacya – type locality for species
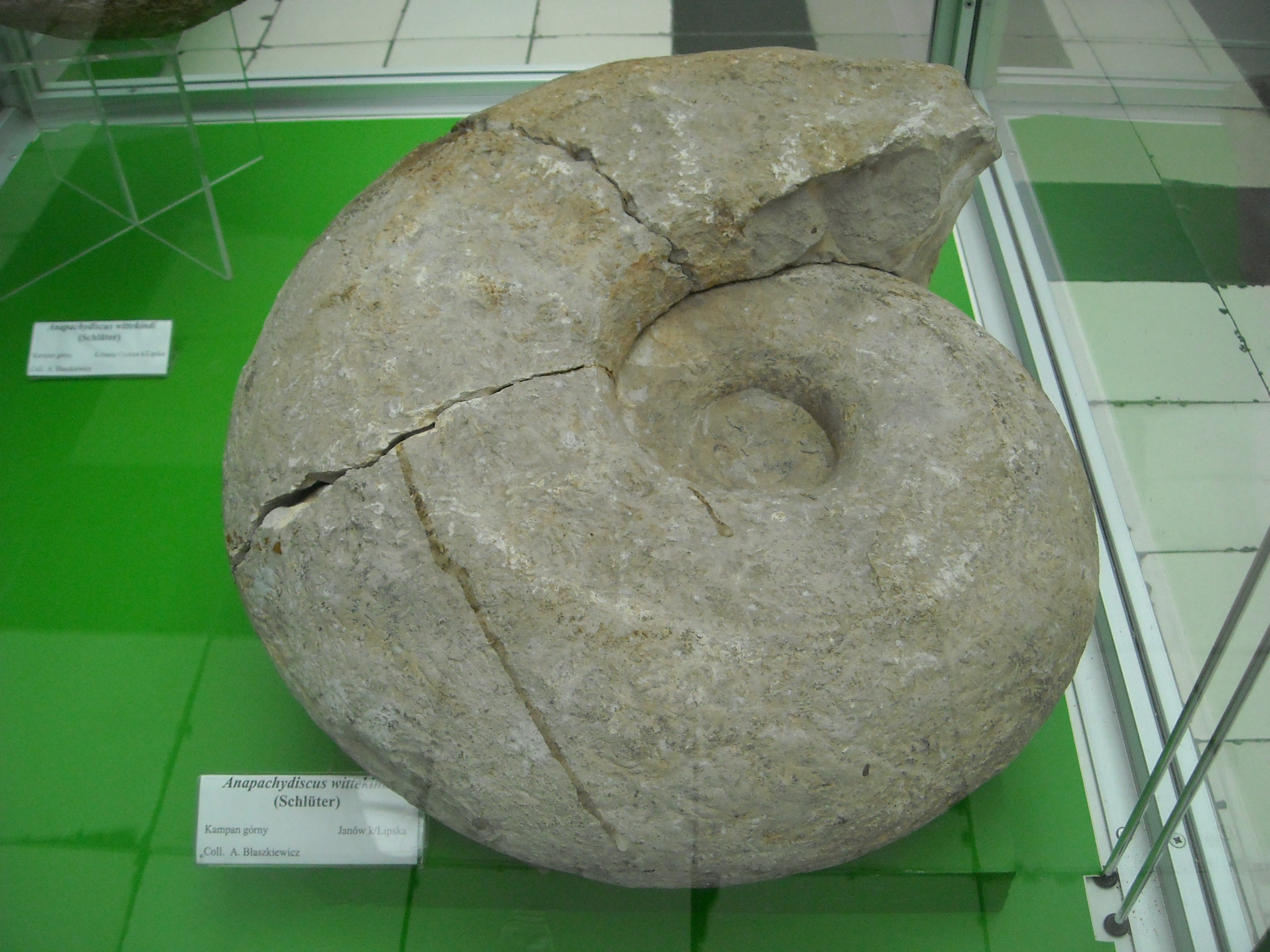
- Fossilized shell of the Late Cretaceous ammonoid cephalopod Anapachydiscus
  †Anapachydiscus
  - †Anapachydiscus nelchinensis – type locality for species
- †Anatomites
  - †Anatomites externiplicatus
  - †Anatomites septentrionalis – type locality for species
- †Andangularia
  - †Andangularia wilsoni – type locality for species
- †Anomia
- †Anoptychia – tentative report
- †Anthostylis
  - †Anthostylis acanthophora
- †Antiquilima – tentative report
- †Aopullina – tentative report
- †Aquilapollenites
  - †Aquilapollenites decorus
  - †Aquilapollenites fusiformis
  - †Aquilapollenites quadrilobus
  - †Aquilapollenites reticulatus
  - †Aquilapollenites scabridus
- †Arcestes
- †Archaeocidaris – tentative report
- †Archaeodictyomitra
  - †Archaeodictyomitra exigua – type locality for species
- †Archaeospongoprunum
  - †Archaeospongoprunum helense – type locality for species
- †Arcthoplites
  - †Arcthoplites belli
  - †Arcthoplites talkeetnanus
- Arctica – tentative report
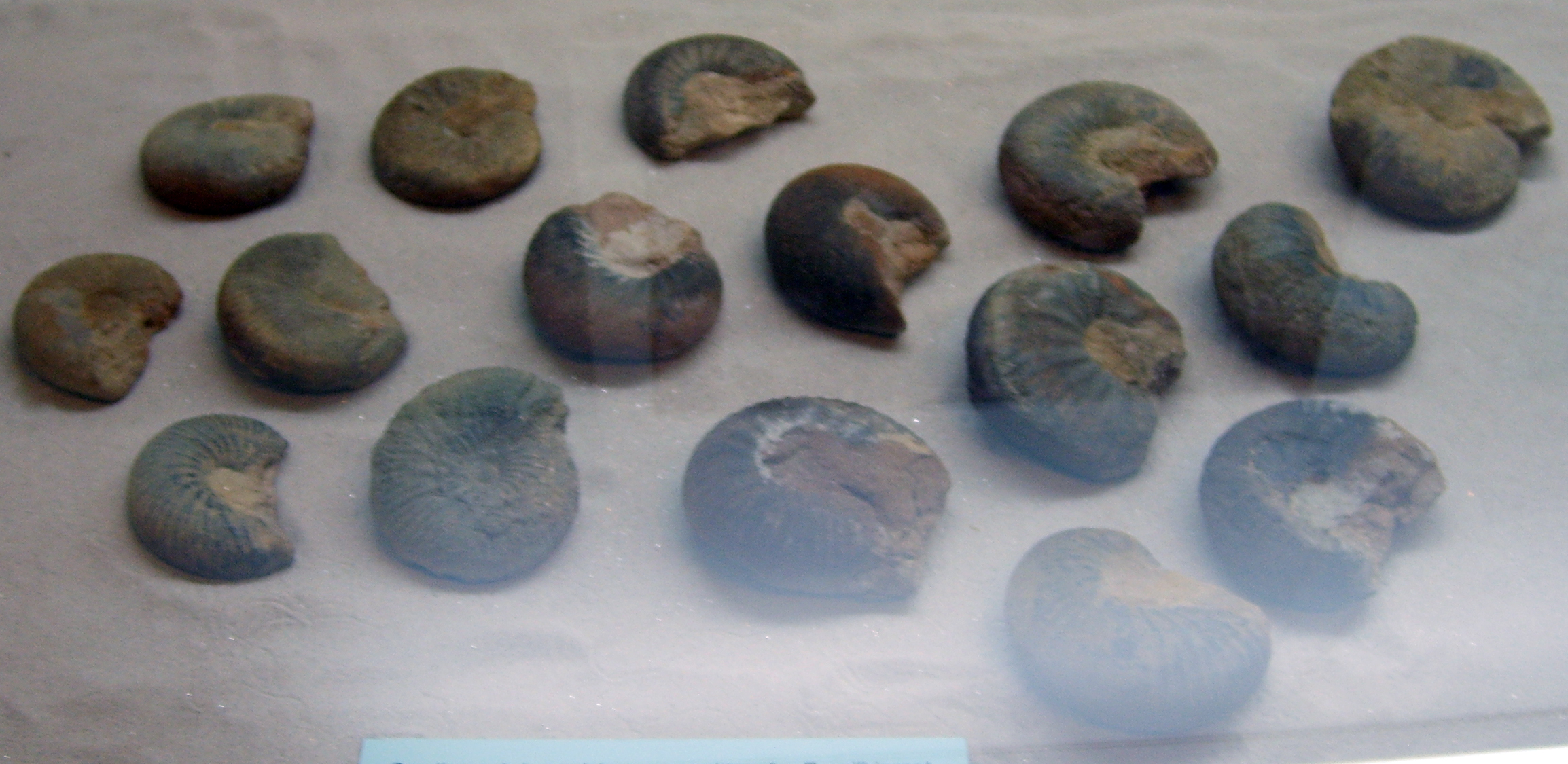
- Fossilized shells of the Middle Jurassic ammonoid cephalopod Arcticoceras
  †Arcticoceras
- †Arctocephalites
  - †Arctocephalites alticostus
  - †Arctocephalites costidensus – type locality for species
  - †Arctocephalites pompeckji
- †Arctoceras
  - †Arctoceras blomstrandi
  - †Arctoceras tuberculatum
  - †Arctoceras tuberculatus
- †Arctopteris
  - †Arctopteris kolymensis – or unidentified related form
  - †Arctopteris rarinervis
- †Areaseris
  - †Areaseris nevadensis
- †Arieticeras
  - †Arieticeras domarense – or unidentified related form
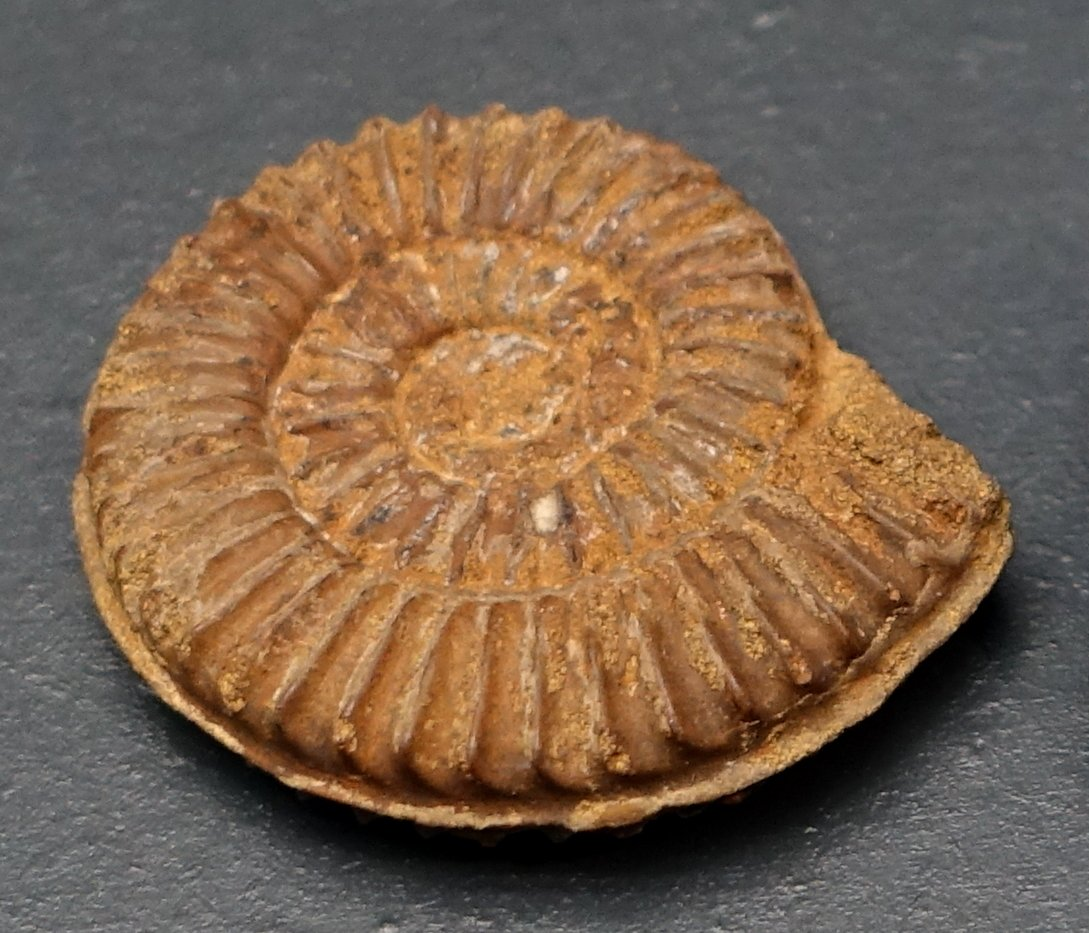
- Fossilized shell of the Early Jurassic ammonoid cephalopod Arnioceras
  †Arnioceras
  - †Arnioceras arnouldi – or unidentified comparable form
- †Arpadites – tentative report
- †Aspenites
  - †Aspenites acutus
- Astarte
  - †Astarte carlottensis
- †Asthenoceras
  - †Asthenoceras nannodes – or unidentified related form
- †Astraeomorpha
  - †Astraeomorpha confusa
  - †Astraeomorpha crassisepta
- †Astrocoenia – tentative report
- †Atractites
- †Atreta
- †Aucella
  - †Aucella okensis
  - †Aucella spitiensis
  - †Aucella subokensis
- †Aucellina
- Avicula
  - †Avicula soperi
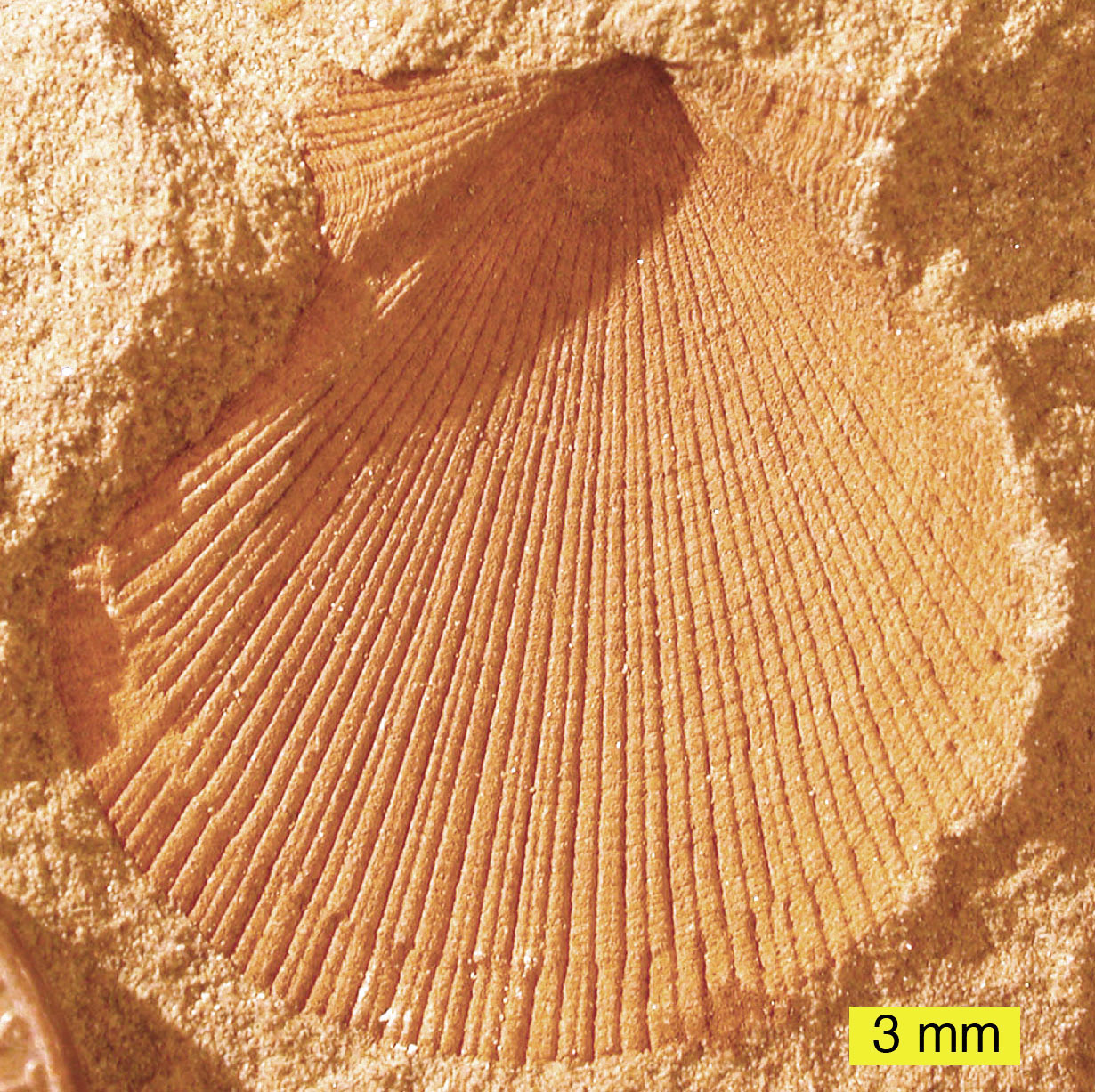
- Mold fossil of a shell of the Early Devonian-Late Triassic bivalve Aviculopecten
  †Aviculopecten
- †Azonia
  - †Azonia cribrata
  - †Azonia pulchella
  - †Azonia strictiparva

== B ==
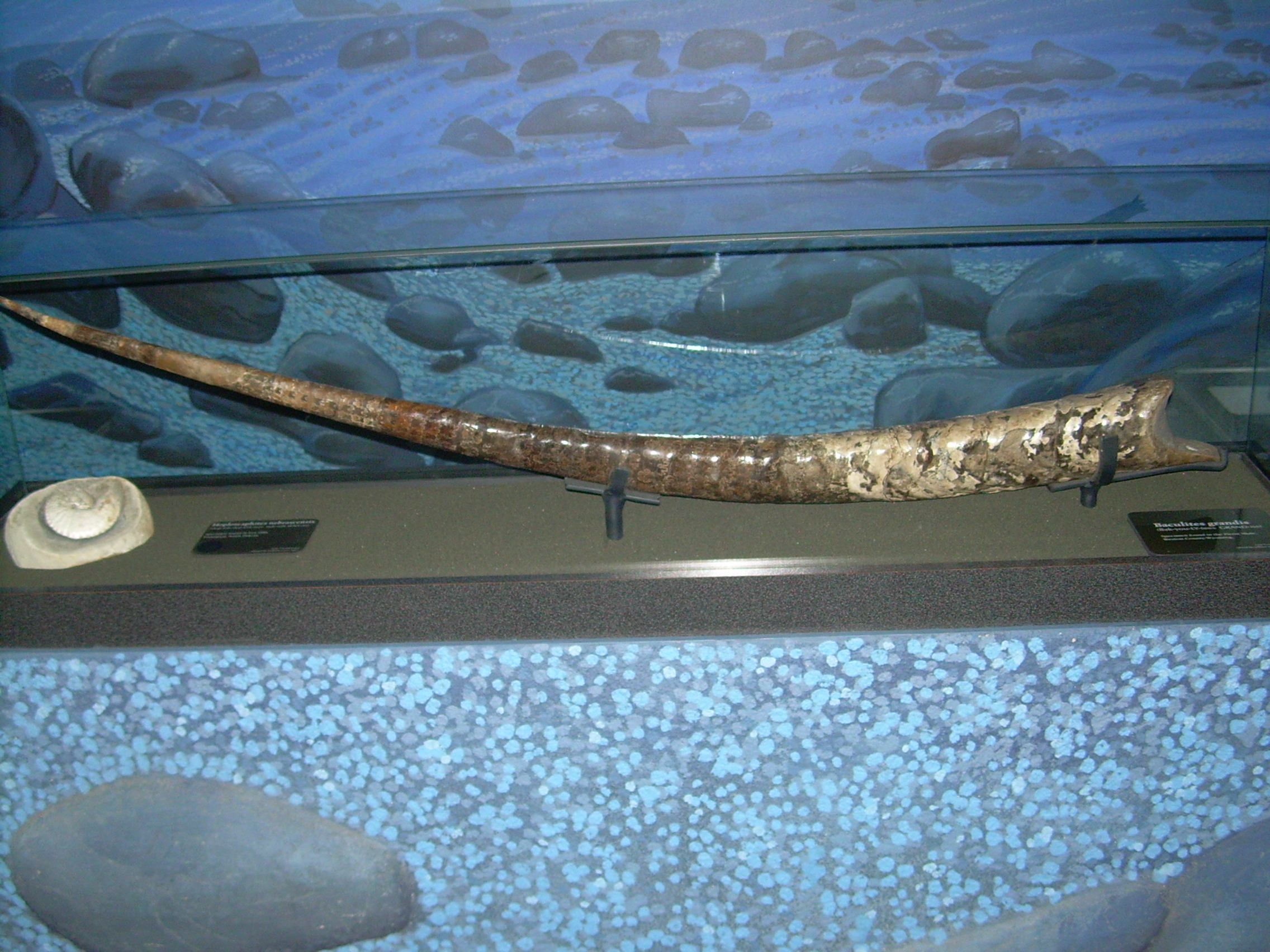
- Fossilized shell of the Late Cretaceous ammonoid cephalopod Baculites
  †Baculites
  - †Baculites occidentalis
- †Badouxia
  - †Badouxia canadensis
  - †Badouxia columbiae
- †Bathysiphon
- †Belemnites
- †Betraccium
  - †Betraccium perilense – or unidentified related form
- †Bipedis
  - †Bipedis acrostylus
- †Biplica
- †Birisia
  - †Birisia alata
  - †Birisia ochotica
  - †Birisia oerstedtii – or unidentified comparable form
- †Bisulcocypridea
- †Bositra
  - †Bositra buchi – or unidentified comparable form
- †Bradfordia
  - †Bradfordia oppeliiformis – type locality for species
- †Brewericeras
  - †Brewericeras breweri
  - †Brewericeras hulenense
  - †Brewericeras hulense – or unidentified comparable form
- †Buchia
  - †Buchia bronni – or unidentified comparable form
  - †Buchia concentrica
  - †Buchia crassicolis
  - †Buchia crassicollis
  - †Buchia fischeriana – or unidentified related form
  - †Buchia keyserlingi
  - †Buchia mosquensis
  - †Buchia pacifica
  - †Buchia pallasi – or unidentified comparable form
  - †Buchia piochii
  - †Buchia rugosa
  - †Buchia solida
  - †Buchia sublaevis
- †Bullatimorphites
  - †Bullatimorphites varicostatum – type locality for species

== C ==
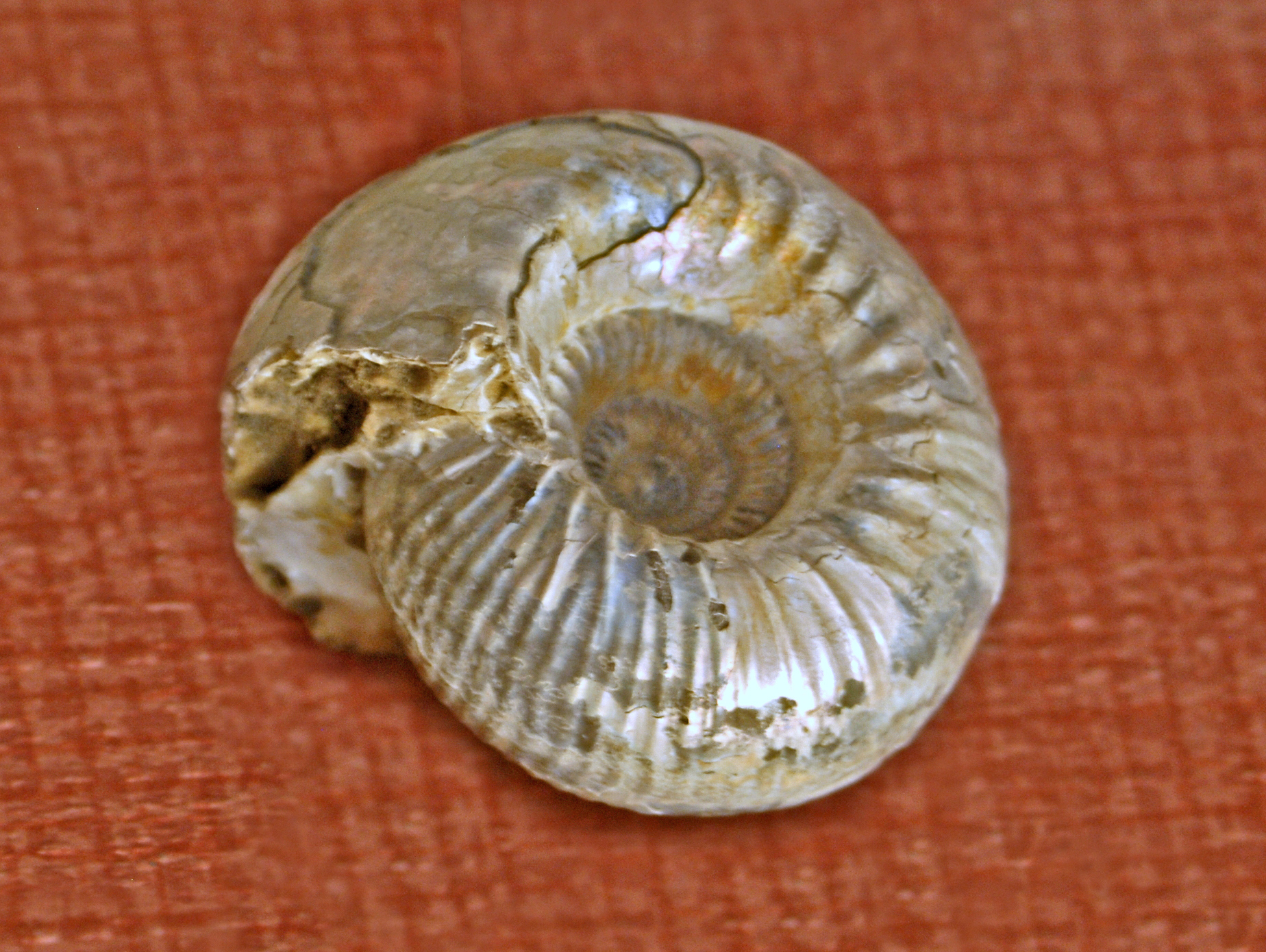
- Fossilized shell of the Middle Jurassic ammonoid cephalopod Cadoceras
  †Cadoceras
  - †Cadoceras bathomphalum – type locality for species
  - †Cadoceras catostoma
  - †Cadoceras chinitnense – type locality for species
  - †Cadoceras comma – type locality for species
  - †Cadoceras crassicostatum – type locality for species
  - †Cadoceras doroschini
  - †Cadoceras glabrum – type locality for species
  - †Cadoceras grewingki
  - †Cadoceras kialagvikense – type locality for species
  - †Cadoceras petelini
  - †Cadoceras schmidti
  - †Cadoceras tenuicostatum – type locality for species
  - †Cadoceras wosnessenskii
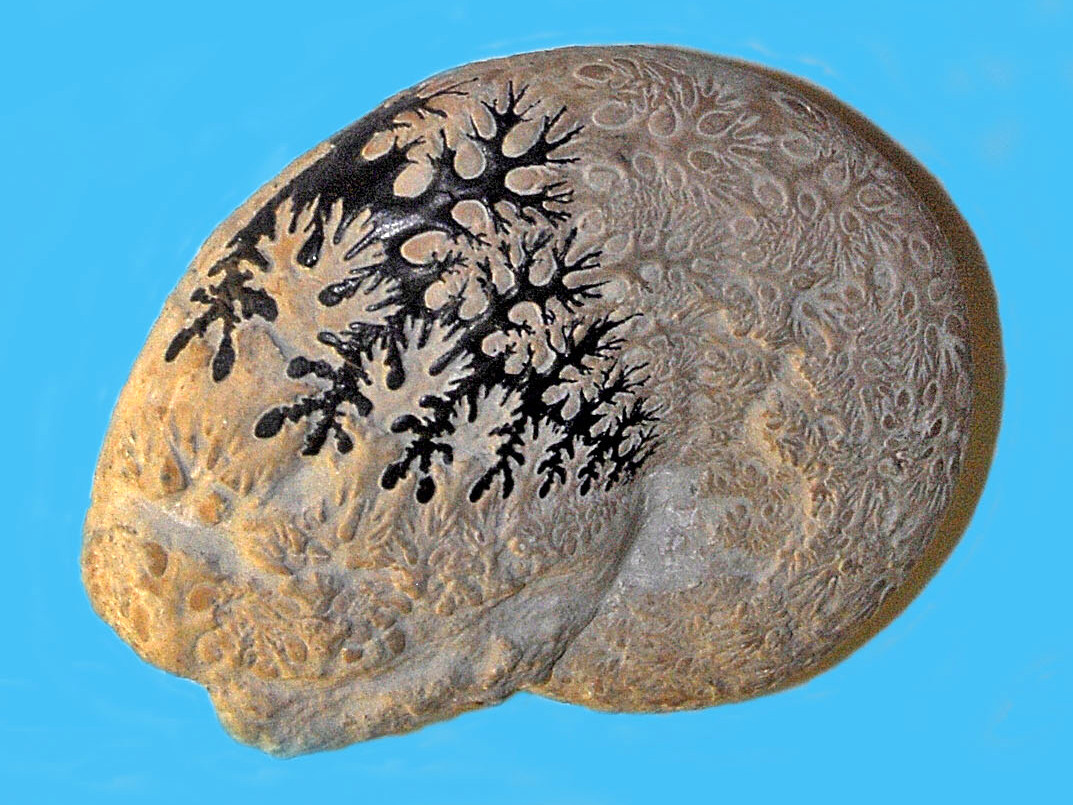
- Fossilized shell of the Early Jurassic-Early Cretaceous ammonoid cephalopod Calliphylloceras
  †Calliphylloceras
  - †Calliphylloceras aldersoni – or unidentified comparable form
  - †Calliphylloceras freibrocki – type locality for species
  - †Calliphylloceras nizinanum – type locality for species
- †Callistopollenites
  - †Callistopollenites radiostriatus
- †Callizoniceras
- †Callospiriferina
  - †Callospiriferina tumida
- †Calycoceras
- †Camptonectes
  - †Camptonectes dettermani
- †Canadoceras
  - †Canadoceras kossmati – or unidentified comparable form
  - †Canadoceras newberryanum
  - †Canadoceras yokoyamai
- †Candonopsis – tentative report
- †Canutus – tentative report
  - †Canutus ingrahamensis
- †Capnuchosphaera
  - †Capnuchosphaera deweveri – or unidentified related form
  - †Capnuchosphaera lenticulata – or unidentified related form
  - †Capnuchosphaera mexicana
  - †Capnuchosphaera schenki
  - †Capnuchosphaera smithorum
  - †Capnuchosphaera theoloides – or unidentified related form
  - †Capnuchosphaera tricornis
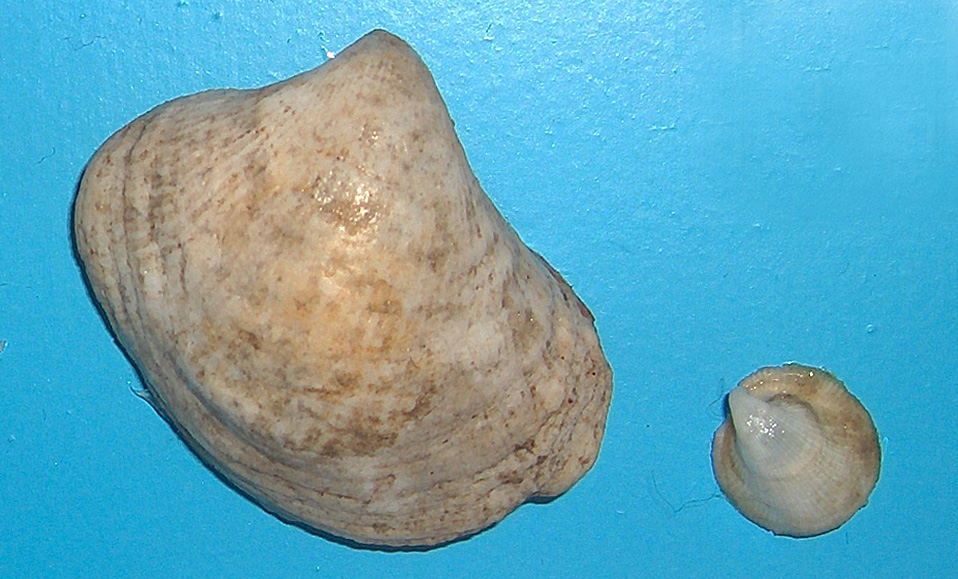
- Shells of modern Capulus cap sea snails
  Capulus – tentative report
- Cardinia
- Cardita – tentative report
- †Cassianella
  - †Cassianella cordillerana – type locality for species
  - †Cassianella gravinaensis – type locality for species
  - †Cassianella lingulata
- †Cavussurella
  - †Cavussurella grammi – type locality for species
- †Cedriplites
  - †Cedriplites canadensis
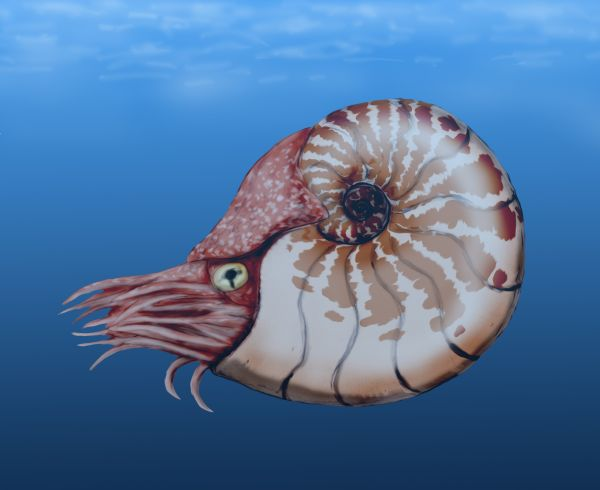
- Life restoration of the Late Triassic-Middle Jurassic nautiloid cephalopod Cenoceras
  †Cenoceras
  - †Cenoceras imlayi – type locality for species
- †Cephalotaxopsis
  - †Cephalotaxopsis intermedia
- †Ceratites
- †Cercomya – tentative report
- †Ceriostella
  - †Ceriostella martini
  - †Ceriostella parva
- Cerithium – tentative report
- †Chandlerichthys – type locality for genus
  - †Chandlerichthys strickeri – type locality for species
- †Chinitnites
  - †Chinitnites parviformus – type locality for species
- Chlamys
- †Choffatia
- †Chondrites – tentative report
  - †Chondrites heeri – or unidentified comparable form
- †Chondrocoenia
  - †Chondrocoenia paradoxa – or unidentified comparable form
- †Chonetes – tentative report
- †Christitys
  - †Christitys martini – type locality for species
- †Chulitnacula
  - †Chulitnacula alaskana – type locality for species
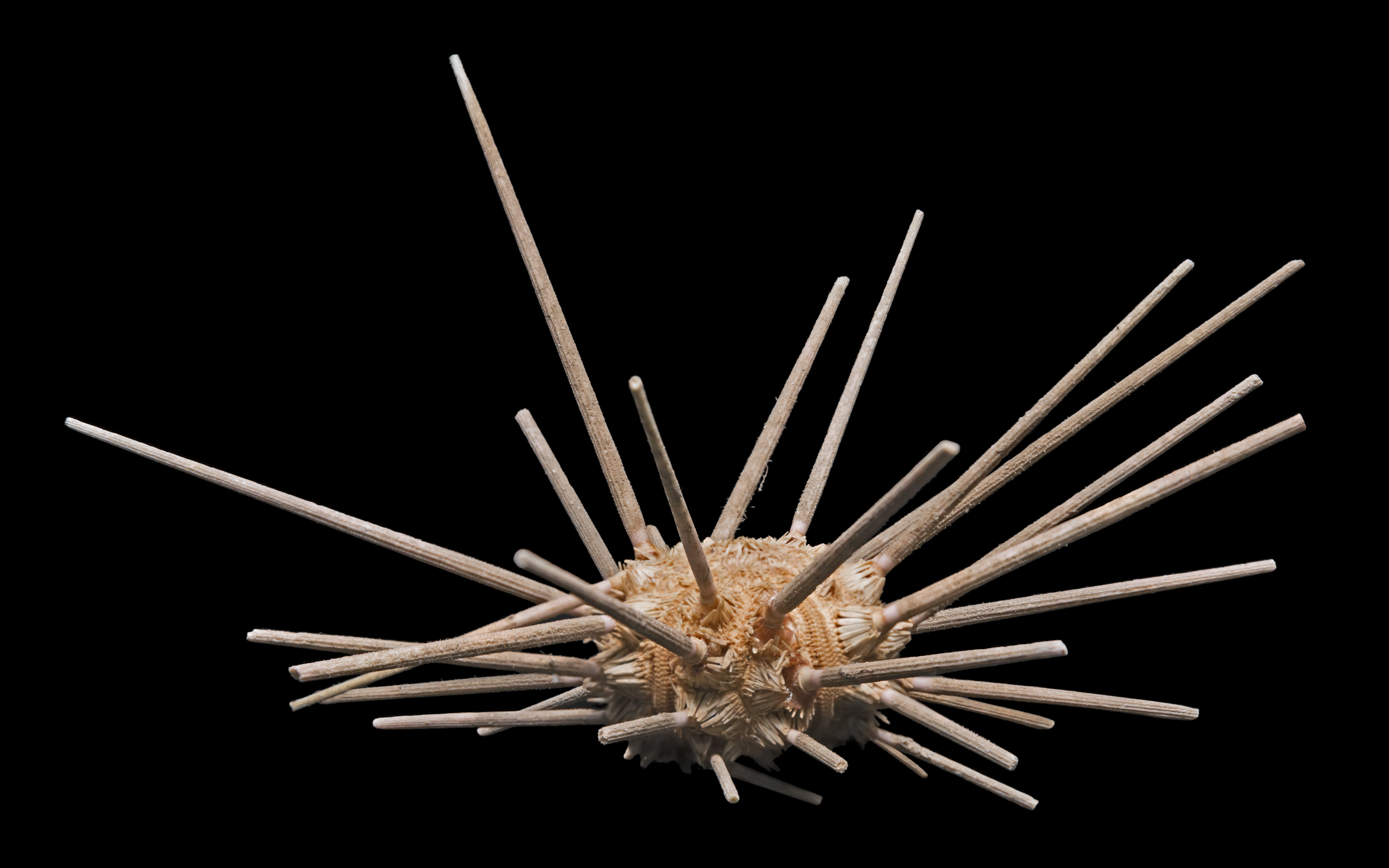
- Shell and spines of a Cidaris sea urchin
  Cidaris – tentative report
- †Cimolodon
- Cladophlebis
  - †Cladophlebis hirta – tentative report
- †Claraia
  - †Claraia stachei
- †Cleoniceras
  - †Cleoniceras overbecki – type locality for species
- †Clionitites – tentative report
- †Cobbanites
  - †Cobbanites talkeetnanus
- †Coccophyllum
- †Collonia
  - †Collonia occidentalis – or unidentified comparable form
- †Coniopteris
  - †Coniopteris arctica - or unidentified loosely related form
  - †Coniopteris saportana
- †Conucardia
- †Corum
  - †Corum perfectum
  - †Corum regium
  - †Corum speciosum
- †Cosmonautilus – tentative report
- †Costispiriferina
  - †Costispiriferina pittensis – or unidentified related form
- †Covracythere
  - †Covracythere binoda – type locality for species
  - †Covracythere gryci – type locality for species
- †Cranwellia
  - †Cranwellia rumseyensis
  - †Cranwellia striata
- †Crassistella
  - †Crassistella juvavica
  - †Crassistella parvula
  - †Crassistella vesiculosa – or unidentified comparable form
- †Crenipecten – tentative report
  - †Crenipecten crenulatus – or unidentified comparable form
- †Crucella
  - †Crucella magna – type locality for species
- †Ctenis
- †Ctenophyllum
  - †Ctenophyllum angustifolim – tentative report
- †Cuifia
  - †Cuifia marmorea – or unidentified comparable form
- †Curtoseris
  - †Curtoseris dunlapcanyonae
- †Cyathocoenia
- †Cycloceltites
  - †Cycloceltites arduini – or unidentified comparable form
- †Cylindroteuthis
- †Cypridea
- †Cyrtia
- †Cyrtina – report made of unidentified related form or using admittedly obsolete nomenclature

== D ==
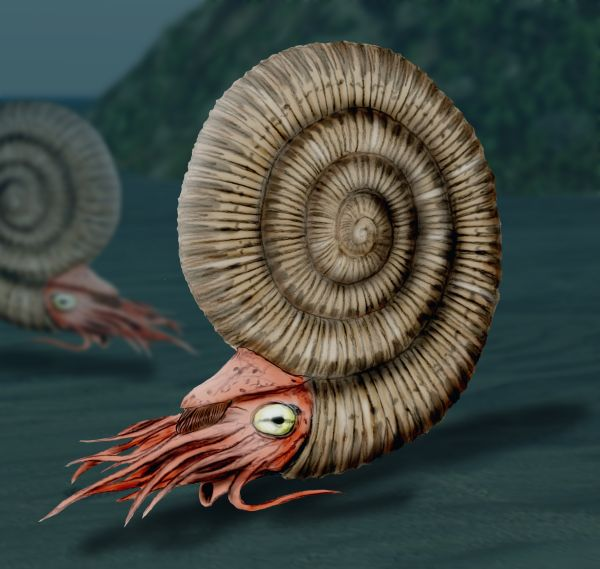
- Life restoration of the Early Jurassic ammonoid cephalopod Dactylioceras
  †Dactylioceras
  - †Dactylioceras commune – or unidentified comparable form
  - †Dactylioceras kanense
- †Dagyspirifer – type locality for genus
  - †Dagyspirifer fascicostata – type locality for species
- †Damesites
  - †Damesites hetonaiensis
- †Daonella
- †Daxatina
  - †Daxatina canadensis – or unidentified comparable form
- Dentalina
- †Dentalium
- †Desmiophyllum
  - †Desmiophyllum magnum
  - †Desmiophyllum spp.
- †Desmoceras
  - †Desmoceras japonicum
- †Desmophyllites
  - †Desmophyllites diphylloides
- †Dettermania
  - †Dettermania truncata – type locality for species
- Dicotylophyllum
  - †Dicotylophyllum spp.
- †Dictyophyllum
  - †Dictyophyllum nilssoni
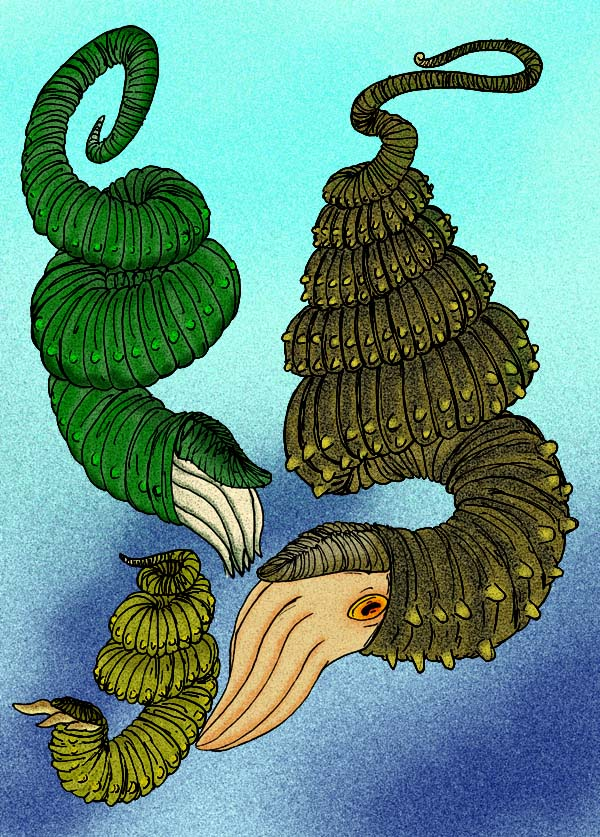
- Restoration of several species of the Late Cretaceous ammonoid cephalopod Didymoceras
  †Didymoceras
  - †Didymoceras hornbyense – or unidentified related form
- †Dielasma – tentative report
  - †Dielasma chapini – type locality for species
- †Dieneroceras
  - †Dieneroceras dieneri
- †Dimyodon
  - †Dimyodon storrsi
- †Diplomoceras
  - †Diplomoceras notabile
  - †Diplomoceras notable
- †Discamphiceras
  - †Discamphiceras reissi – or unidentified related form
  - †Discamphiceras silberlingi – or unidentified comparable form
- †Discophyllites
  - †Discophyllites patens
- †Discotropites
  - †Discotropites davisi
  - †Discotropites mojsvarensis
  - †Discotropites sandlingensis
- †Distichomeandra
  - †Distichomeandra austriaca
  - †Distichomeandra minor
- †Distichophyllia
  - †Distichophyllia marmorea
  - †Distichophyllia melnikovae – type locality for species
  - †Distichophyllia norica
- Ditrupa
  - †Ditrupa cornu – type locality for species
- †Divatella
  - †Divatella robinsoni – type locality for species
- †Docidoceras
  - †Docidoceras camachoi – type locality for species
  - †Docidoceras longalvum – or unidentified related form
  - †Docidoceras paucinodosum – type locality for species
  - †Docidoceras widebayense – type locality for species
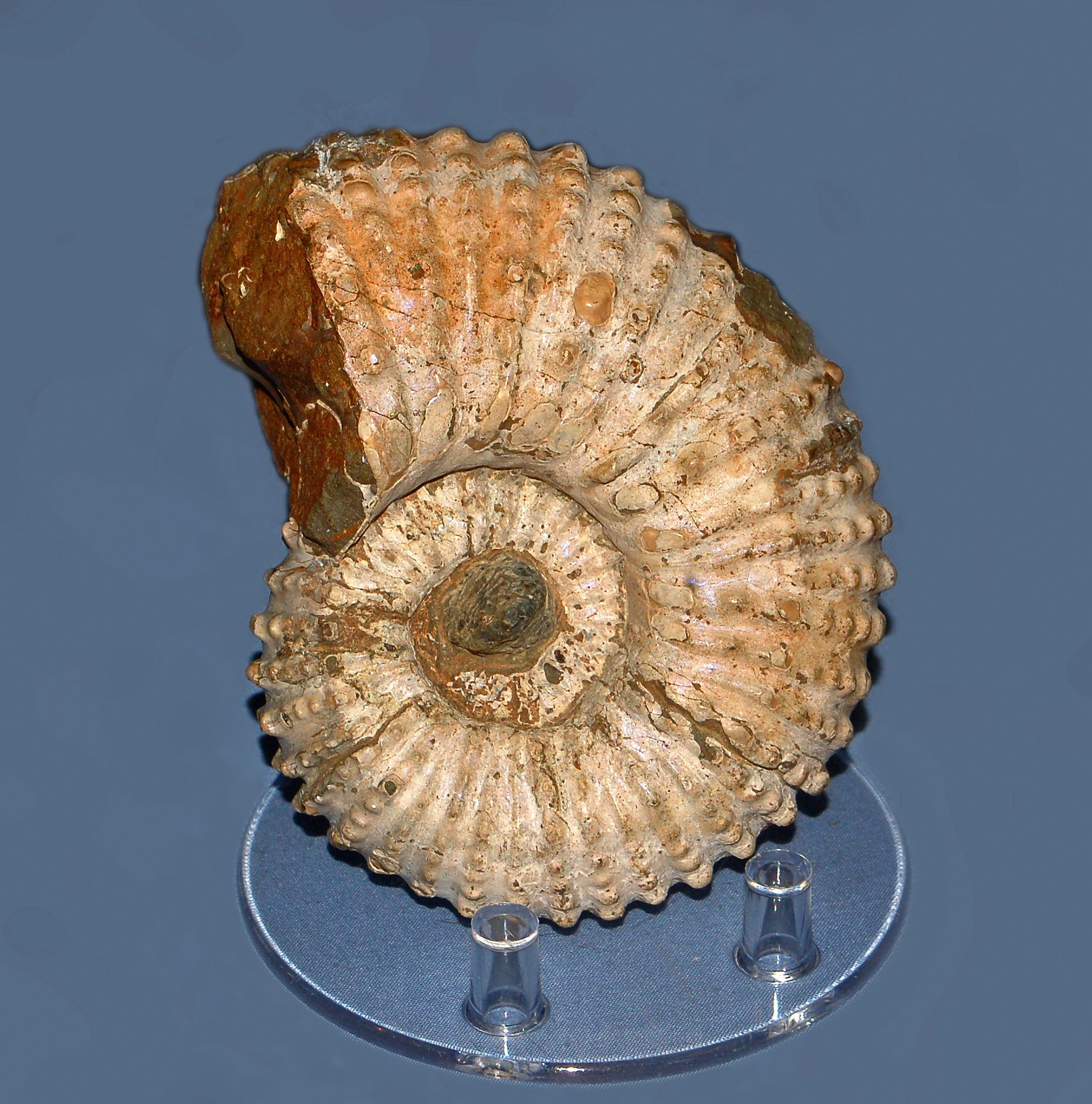
- Fossilized shell of the Early-Late Cretaceous ammonoid cephalopod Douvilleiceras
  †Douvilleiceras
  - †Douvilleiceras mammillatum
- †Dromaeosaurus
  - †Dromaeosaurus albertensis

== E ==
- †Edmontonia
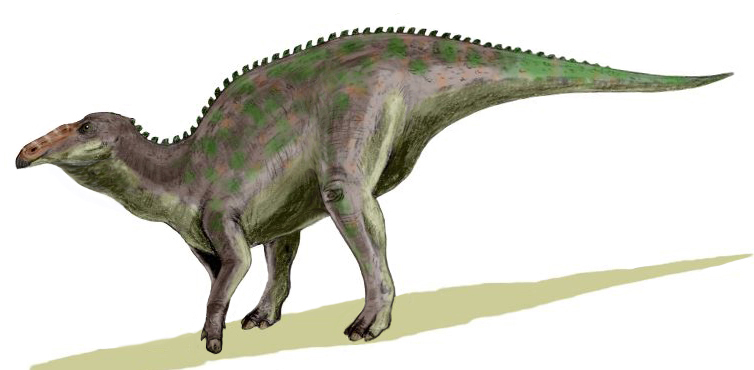
- Restoration of the Late Cretaceous duck-billed dinosaur Edmontosaurus annectens
  †Edmontosaurus – or unidentified related form
  - †Edmontosaurus saskatchewanensis
- †Eleganticeras
  - †Eleganticeras exaratum – or unidentified comparable form
- †Ellisonia
  - †Ellisonia triassica
- †Elymella – tentative report
  - †Elymella nuculoides – or unidentified comparable form
- †Elysastraea
  - †Elysastraea profunda
  - †Elysastraea vancouverensis
- †Enantigonathus
  - †Enantigonathus mungoensis
  - †Enantigonathus ziegleri
- †Entolium
  - †Entolium utukokense – type locality for species
  - †Entolium yukonensis – type locality for species
- †Entollum
- †Eocomoseris
  - †Eocomoseris ramosa
- †Eogunnarites
  - †Eogunnarites alaskaensis
  - †Eogunnarites alaskensis
- †Eolytoceras
  - †Eolytoceras tasekoi – or unidentified comparable form
- †Eopecten – tentative report
- †Epigondolella
  - †Epigondolella bidentata – or unidentified comparable form
- †Eptingium
  - †Eptingium manfredi – or unidentified comparable form
- †Equisetites
  - †Equisetites burejensis
- †Erdtmanipollis
  - †Erdtmanipollis procumbentiformis
- †Erycites
  - †Erycites howelli
- †Euaptetoceras
  - †Euaptetoceras amplectens
  - †Euaptetoceras nucleospinosum – or unidentified related form
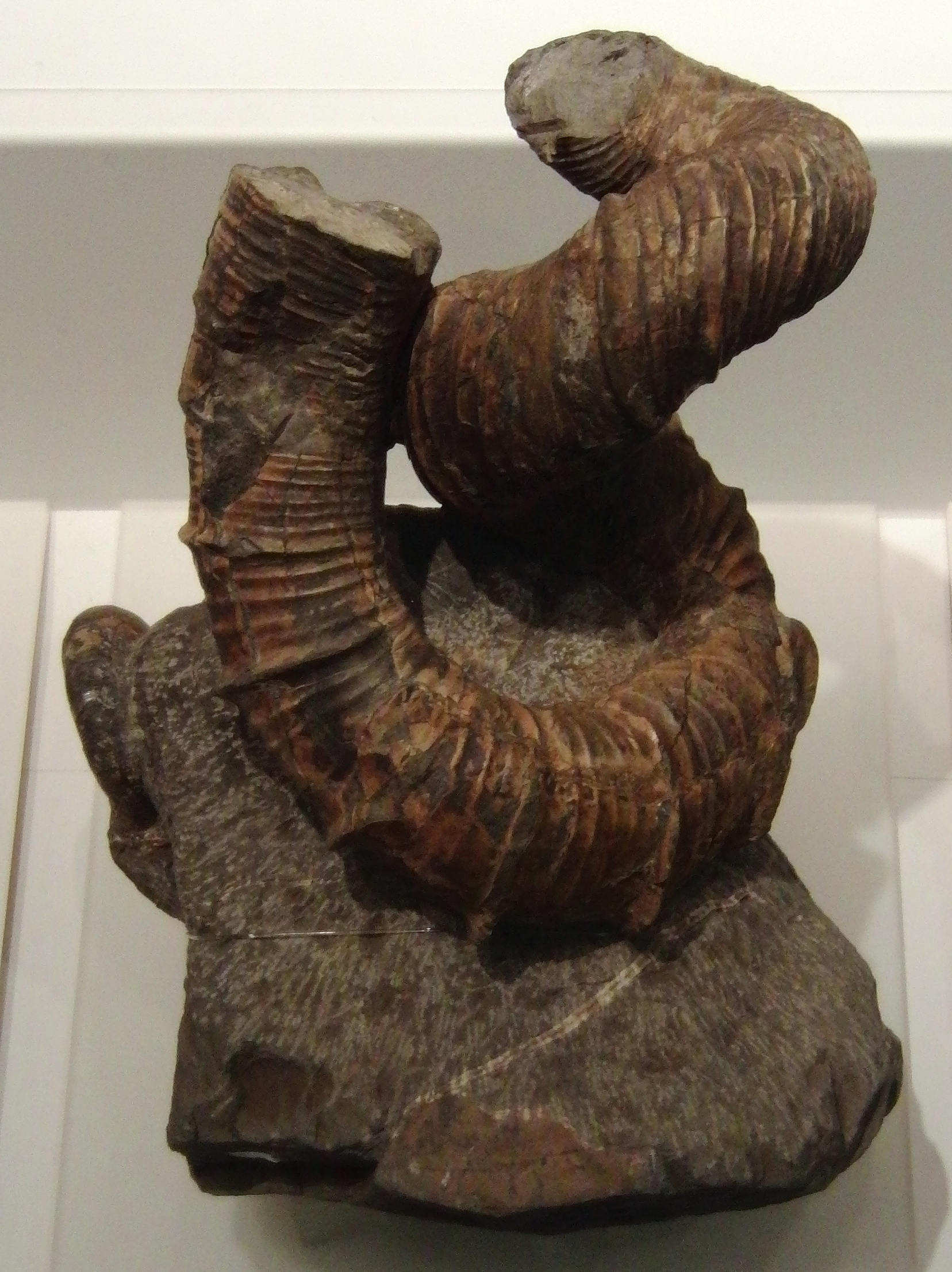
- Fossilized shell of the Late Cretaceous ammonoid cephalopod Eubostrychoceras
  †Eubostrychoceras
  - †Eubostrychoceras japonicum – or unidentified comparable form
- †Eudmetoceras
  - †Eudmetoceras eudmetum – or unidentified related form
- †Euflemingites
  - †Euflemingites cirratus
  - †Euflemingites romunderi
- †Eumorphotis
  - †Eumorphotis nationalis – type locality for species
- †Euomphaloceras
- †Euomphalus
- †Euphyllites – tentative report

== F ==
- †Faguspollenites
  - †Faguspollenites granulatus
- †Fanninoceras
  - †Fanninoceras carlottense
  - †Fanninoceras fannini
  - †Fanninoceras maudense – or unidentified comparable form
- †Ferresium
- †Fibulapollis
- †Fissirhynchia
  - †Fissirhynchia fissicostata
- †Flaventia – tentative report
  - †Flaventia kukpowrukensis – type locality for species
- †Franziceras – tentative report
- †Freboldiceras – type locality for genus
  - †Freboldiceras singulare – type locality for species
- †Fresvillia
  - †Fresvillia teres – or unidentified related form

== G ==
- †Gabbioceras
- †Gablonzeria
  - †Gablonzeria grandiosa
  - †Gablonzeria major
  - †Gablonzeria profunda
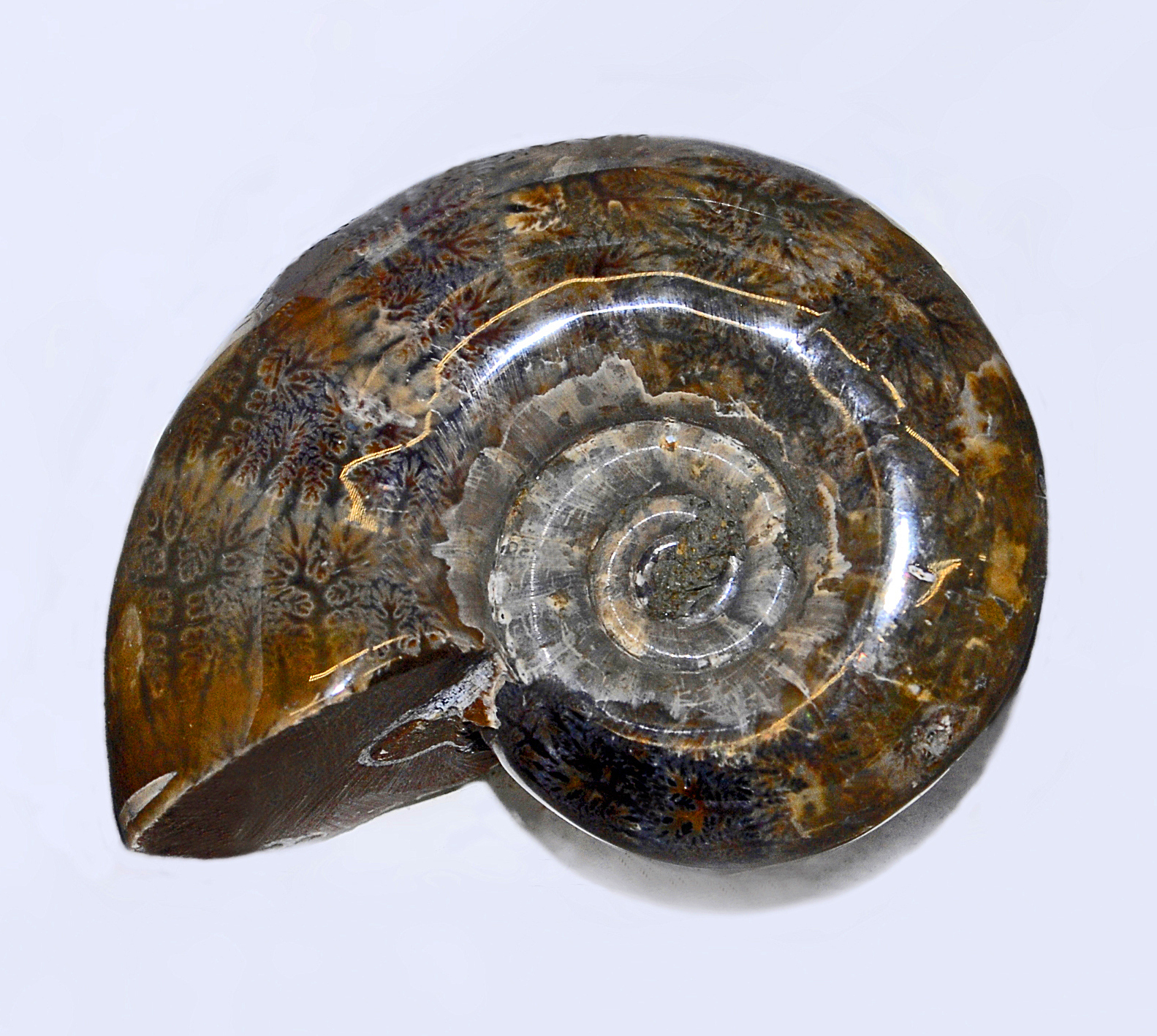
- Fossilized shell of the Cretaceous ammonoid cephalopod Gaudryceras
  †Gaudryceras
  - †Gaudryceras denseplicatum – or unidentified related form
  - †Gaudryceras hobetsense
  - †Gaudryceras tenuiliratum
- †Gavellinella
  - †Gavellinella velascoensis – or unidentified comparable form
- †Germanonautilus
  - †Germanonautilus brooksi – type locality for species
- †Gervillia
  - †Gervillia spp.
- Ginkgo
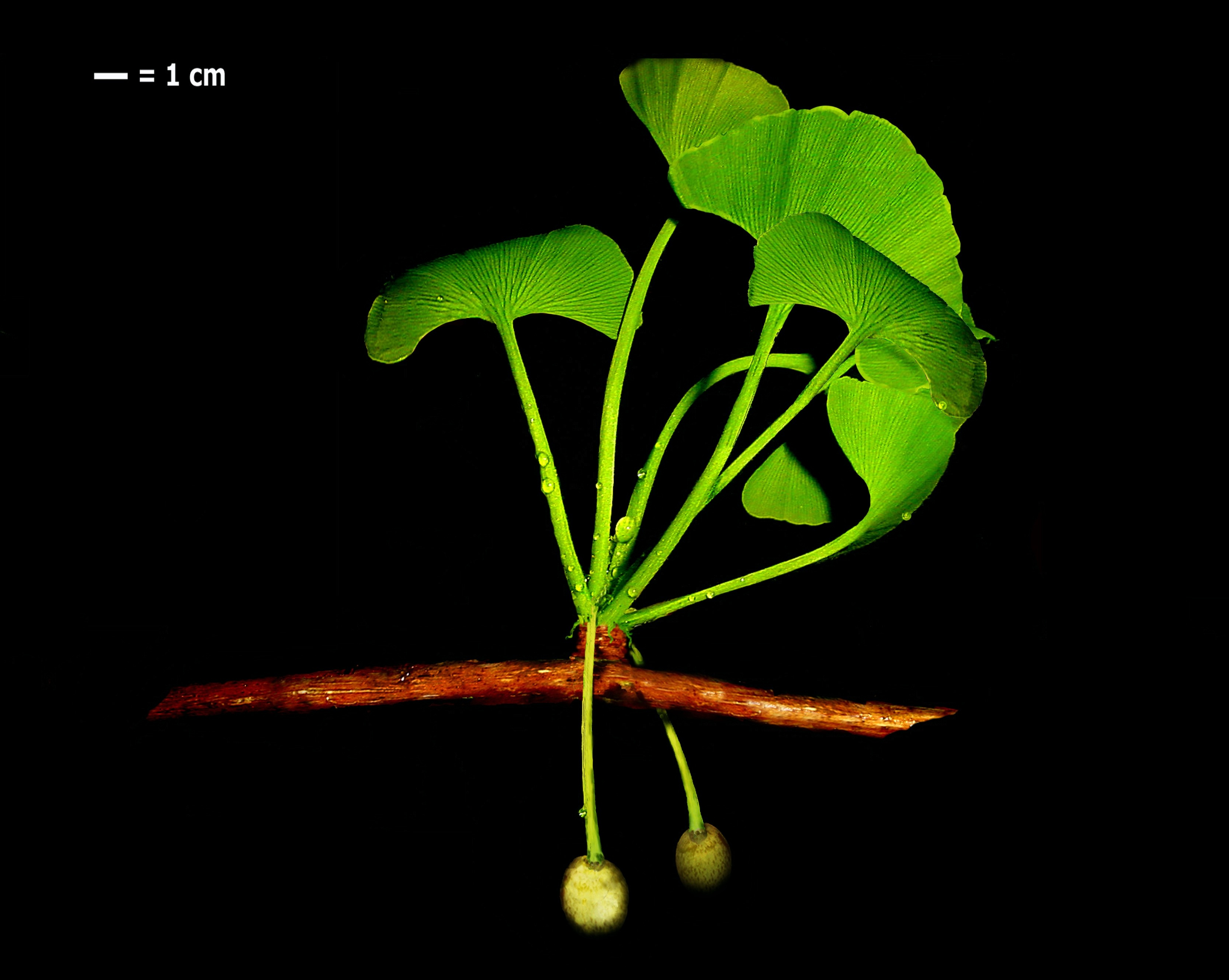
  - Restored foliage of the Late Cretaceous-Miocene ginkgo tree Ginkgo adiantoides
    †Ginkgo adiantoides - or unidentified loosely related form
  - †Ginkgo concinna - or unidentified loosely related form
- Gleichenia
  - †Gleichenia pseudocrenata – or unidentified comparable form
- †Glossites – tentative report
  - †Glossites lingualis – or unidentified comparable form
- †Goniomya – tentative report
- †Gonodon – tentative report
- †Gowericeras
  - †Gowericeras snugharborense – type locality for species
  - †Gowericeras spinosum – type locality for species
- †Grammatodon
- †Grantziceras
  - †Grantziceras affine
  - †Grantziceras glabrum
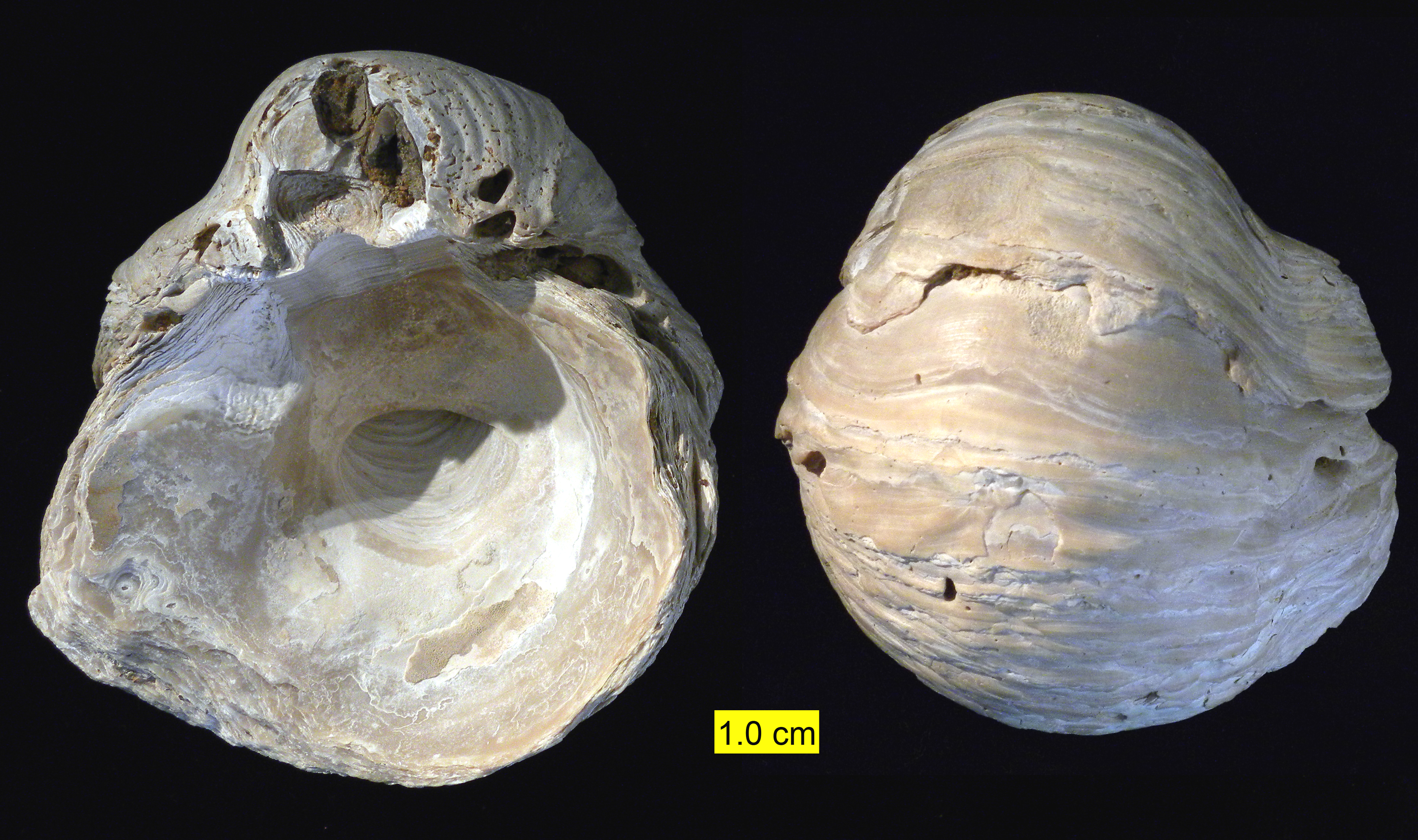
- Interior and exterior of a fossilized shell of the Late Triassic-Eocene marine bivalve Gryphaea
  †Gryphaea
  - †Gryphaea arcuataeformis
  - †Gryphaea arcusta – or unidentified comparable form
  - †Gryphaea cymbium – or unidentified comparable form
  - †Gryphaea impressimarginata
  - †Gryphaea keilhaui – or unidentified comparable form
  - †Gryphaea rockymontana
- †Gulielmiceras
  - †Gulielmiceras alaskanum – type locality for species
- Guttulina
- †Gymnocodium
  - †Gymnocodium bellerophontis
- †Gypsonictops – or unidentified comparable form
- Gyroidinoides

== H ==
- †Halobia
  - †Halobia alaskana – type locality for species
  - †Halobia austriaca
  - †Halobia brooksi – type locality for species
  - †Halobia cordillerana
  - †Halobia dalliana – type locality for species
  - †Halobia dilatata
  - †Halobia distincta
  - †Halobia fallax
  - †Halobia halorica
  - †Halobia lineata
  - †Halobia ornatissima
  - †Halobia septentrionalis – type locality for species
  - †Halobia superba
  - †Halobia sustriaca
  - †Halobia symmetrica – type locality for species
- †Halomitra – report made of unidentified related form or using admittedly obsolete nomenclature
  - †Halomitra triadica
- †Halorella – tentative report
- †Halorites
- †Hamulus – tentative report
- †Hannaoceras – tentative report
- Haplophragmoides
- †Hauerites
- †Healdia
- †Hebetoxyites
  - †Hebetoxyites hebes – or unidentified related form
- †Heilungia
  - †Heilungia oloensis – or unidentified comparable form
- †Heptastylis
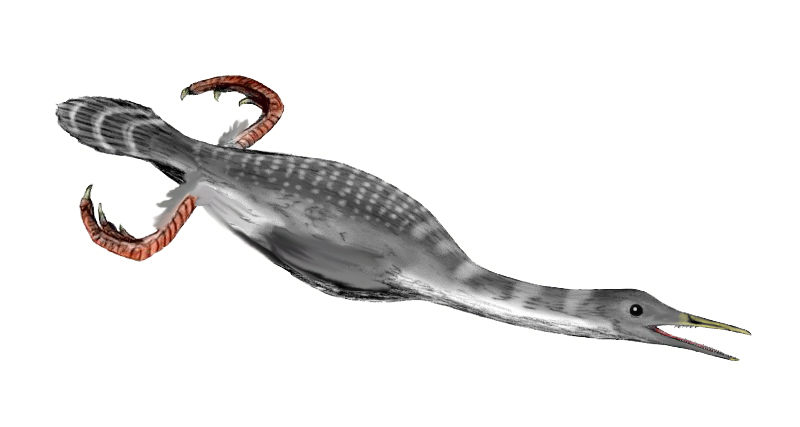
- Life restoration of the Late Cretaceous toothed bird Hesperornis
  †Hesperornis
- †Heterastridium
  - †Heterastridium conglobatum
- Heteropora
- †Hiatobairdia
  - †Hiatobairdia arcuata
- †Higumastra
  - †Higumastra transversa – type locality for species
- †Hildaites – tentative report
- †Himavatites – tentative report
  - †Himavatites multiauritis – or unidentified comparable form
- †Holcophylloceras
  - †Holcophylloceras costisparsum
- †Hoplotropites
  - †Hoplotropites jokelyi – or unidentified comparable form
- †Hsuum – tentative report
  - †Hsuum inexploratum – type locality for species
- †Hulenites
  - †Hulenites reesidei – or unidentified comparable form
- †Hypophylloceras
  - †Hypophylloceras californicatus – or unidentified comparable form
  - †Hypophylloceras californicum – or unidentified comparable form

== I ==
- †Iniskinites
  - †Iniskinites abruptus – type locality for species
  - †Iniskinites intermedius – type locality for species
  - †Iniskinites magniformus
  - †Iniskinites martini – type locality for species
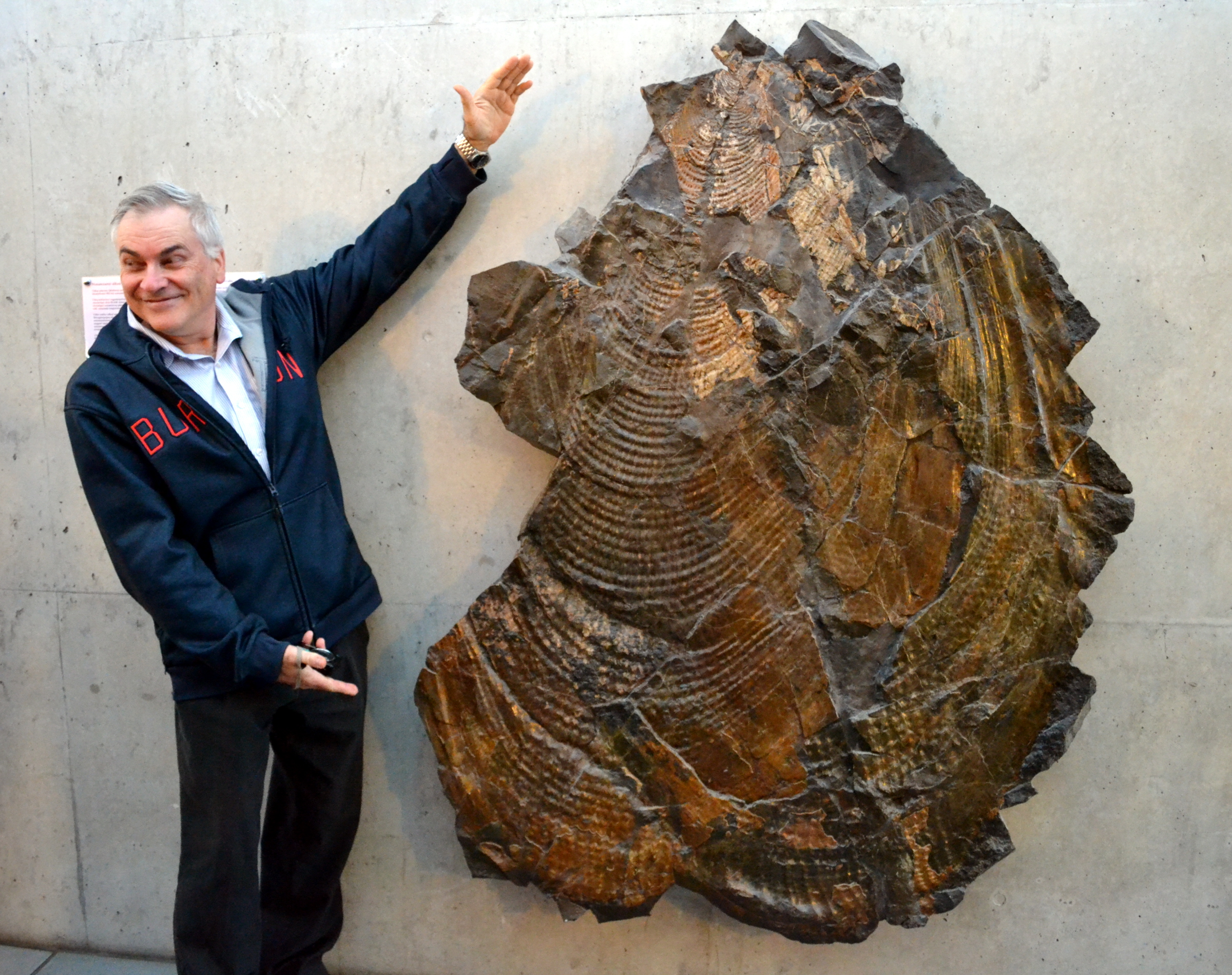
- Fossilized shell of the Early Jurassic-Late Cretaceous marine bivalve Inoceramus with a human indicating its size
  †Inoceramus
  - †Inoceramus comancheanus
  - †Inoceramus cuvieri – or unidentified comparable form
  - †Inoceramus elegans – or unidentified related form
  - †Inoceramus eximius
  - †Inoceramus hobetsensis – or unidentified related form
  - †Inoceramus mamatensis – or unidentified related form
  - †Inoceramus naumanni – or unidentified comparable form
  - †Inoceramus porrectus – or unidentified comparable form
  - †Inoceramus schmidti
  - †Inoceramus subundatus – or unidentified comparable form
  - †Inoceramus teshioensis – or unidentified related form
  - †Inoceramus yokoyamai – or unidentified comparable form
- †Integricorpus
- †Isastrea – tentative report
- Isocrinus
  - †Isocrinus gravinse
- †Isocyprina – tentative report
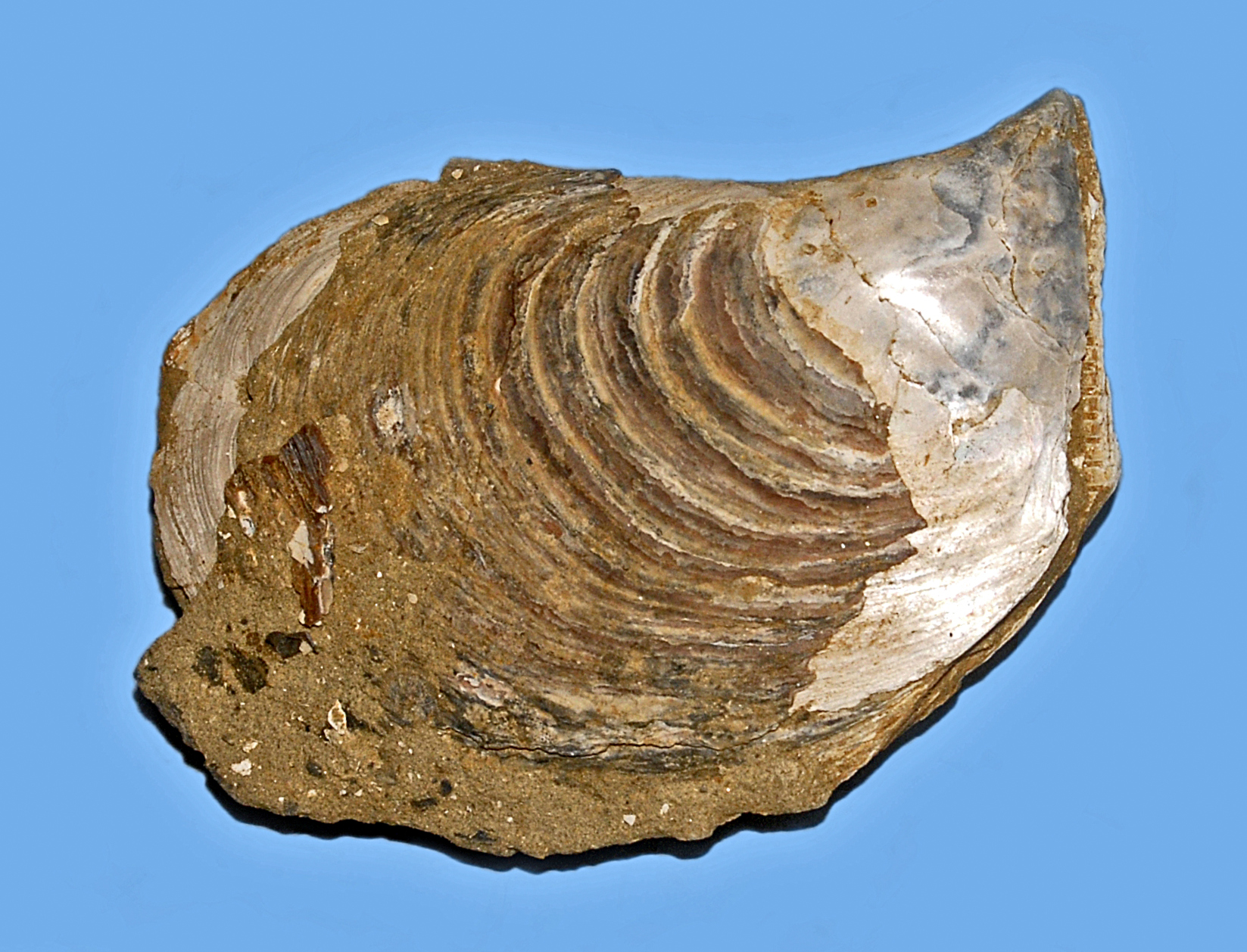
- Fossilized shell of the Permian-modern marine bivalve Isognomon
  Isognomon – tentative report

== J ==
- †Joannites
- †Juvavites
  - †Juvavites knowltoni
  - †Juvavites magnus – or unidentified comparable form
  - †Juvavites subinterruptus
- †Juvenites
  - †Juvenites septentrionalis

== K ==
- †Kammerkarites
  - †Kammerkarites frigga – or unidentified comparable form
  - †Kammerkarites megastoma - or unidentified loosely related form
- †Kenella
  - †Kenella filatovii
- †Kennicottia – type locality for genus
  - †Kennicottia bifurcata – type locality for species
  - †Kennicottia rugosa – type locality for species
- †Kepplerites
- †Kompsasteria
  - †Kompsasteria oligocystis – or unidentified comparable form
- †Kosmoceras
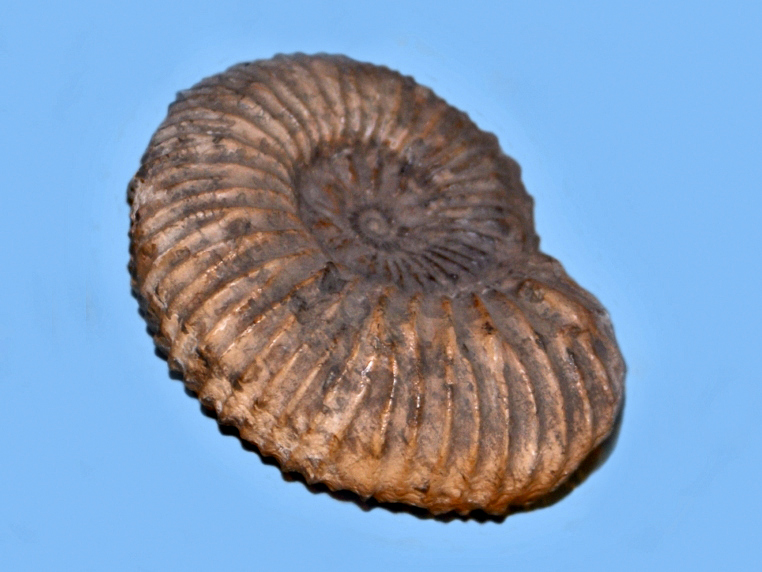
  - Fossilized shell of the Middle Jurassic ammonoid cephalopod Kosmoceras spinosum
    †Kosmoceras spinosum – or unidentified comparable form
- †Kuhnastraea
  - †Kuhnastraea decussata
  - †Kuhnastraea incrassata – type locality for species
- †Kukaspis – type locality for genus
  - †Kukaspis usingeri – type locality for species

== L ==
- †Laballa
  - †Laballa suessi
- †Lanceolites
  - †Lanceolites bicarinatus
  - †Lanceolites compactus
- †Latimaeandra – report made of unidentified related form or using admittedly obsolete nomenclature
  - †Latimaeandra alaskana
- †Leconteites
  - †Leconteites deansi
  - †Leconteites deansii
  - †Leconteites modestus
- †Lemuroceras
  - †Lemuroceras dubium – or unidentified comparable form
- †Leptaleoceras – tentative report
- †Liliacidites
  - †Liliacidites variegatus
- †Lilloettia
  - †Lilloettia buckmani
  - †Lilloettia lilloetensis
  - †Lilloettia mertonyarwoodi
  - †Lilloettia milleri – type locality for species
  - †Lilloettia stantoni – type locality for species
- Lima
  - †Lima blackburnei – type locality for species
  - †Lima kimballi – or unidentified related form
  - †Lima martini – type locality for species
  - †Lima spp.
- †Lioceratoides
  - †Lioceratoides involutum – or unidentified comparable form
- †Liospiriferina
  - †Liospiriferina rostrata
- †Lobites
  - †Lobites pacianus – or unidentified comparable form
- †Lobothyris
  - †Lobothyris monstrifer – or unidentified comparable form
  - †Lobothyris mostrifer – or unidentified comparable form
  - †Lobothyris praepunctata
  - †Lobothyris punctata – or unidentified comparable form
- †Loranthacites
  - †Loranthacites pilatus
- †Lucina
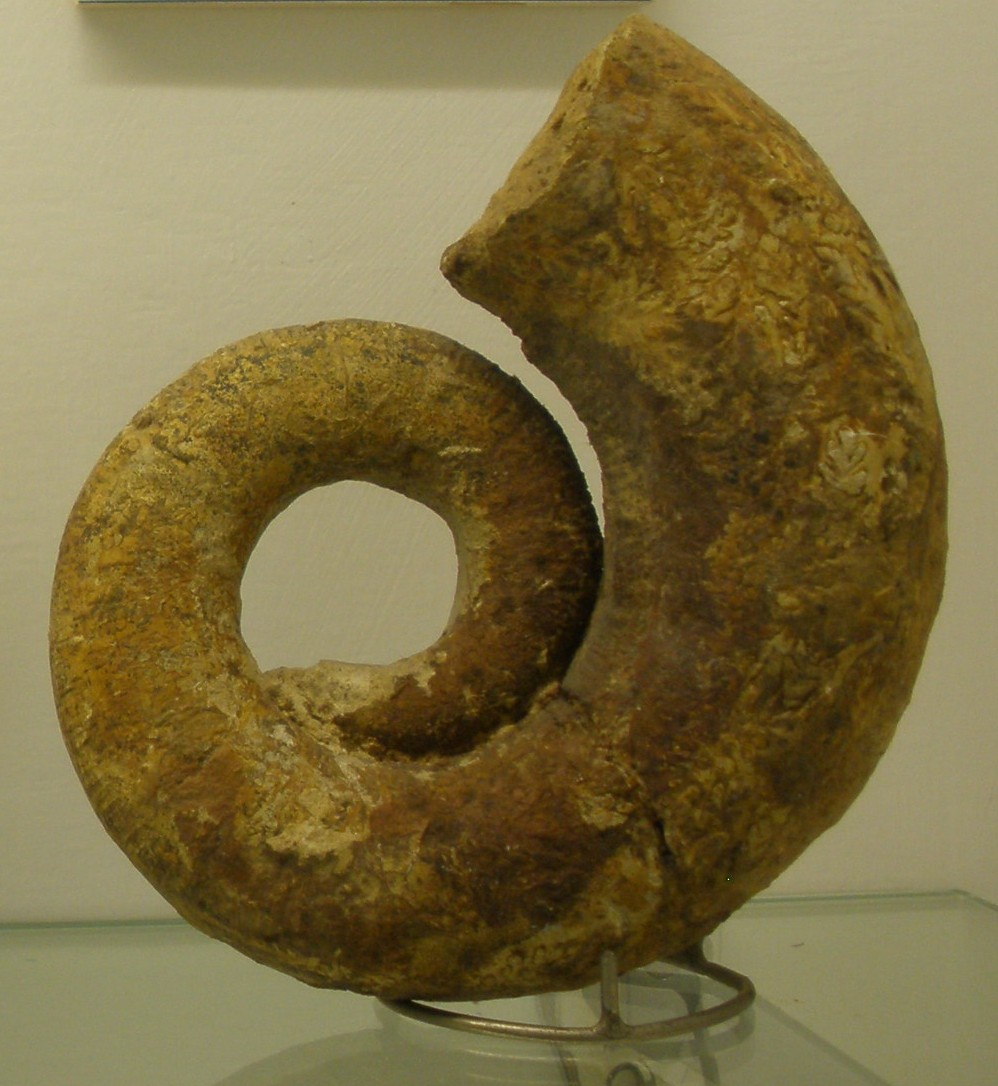
- Fossilized shell of the Early Jurassic-Late Cretaceous ammonoid cephalopod Lytoceras
  †Lytoceras
  - †Lytoceras eudesianum – or unidentified related form
  - †Lytoceras fimbriatum – or unidentified comparable form

== M ==
- †Maclurites – tentative report
- †Macrophylloceras
  - †Macrophylloceras grossicostatum
- †Maeandrostylis
  - †Maeandrostylis grandiseptus
  - †Maeandrostylis vancouverensis
- †Mancicorpus
  - †Mancicorpus trapeziforme
- †Maoritrigonia
- †Margarastraea
  - †Margarastraea eucystis
  - †Margarastraea granissima
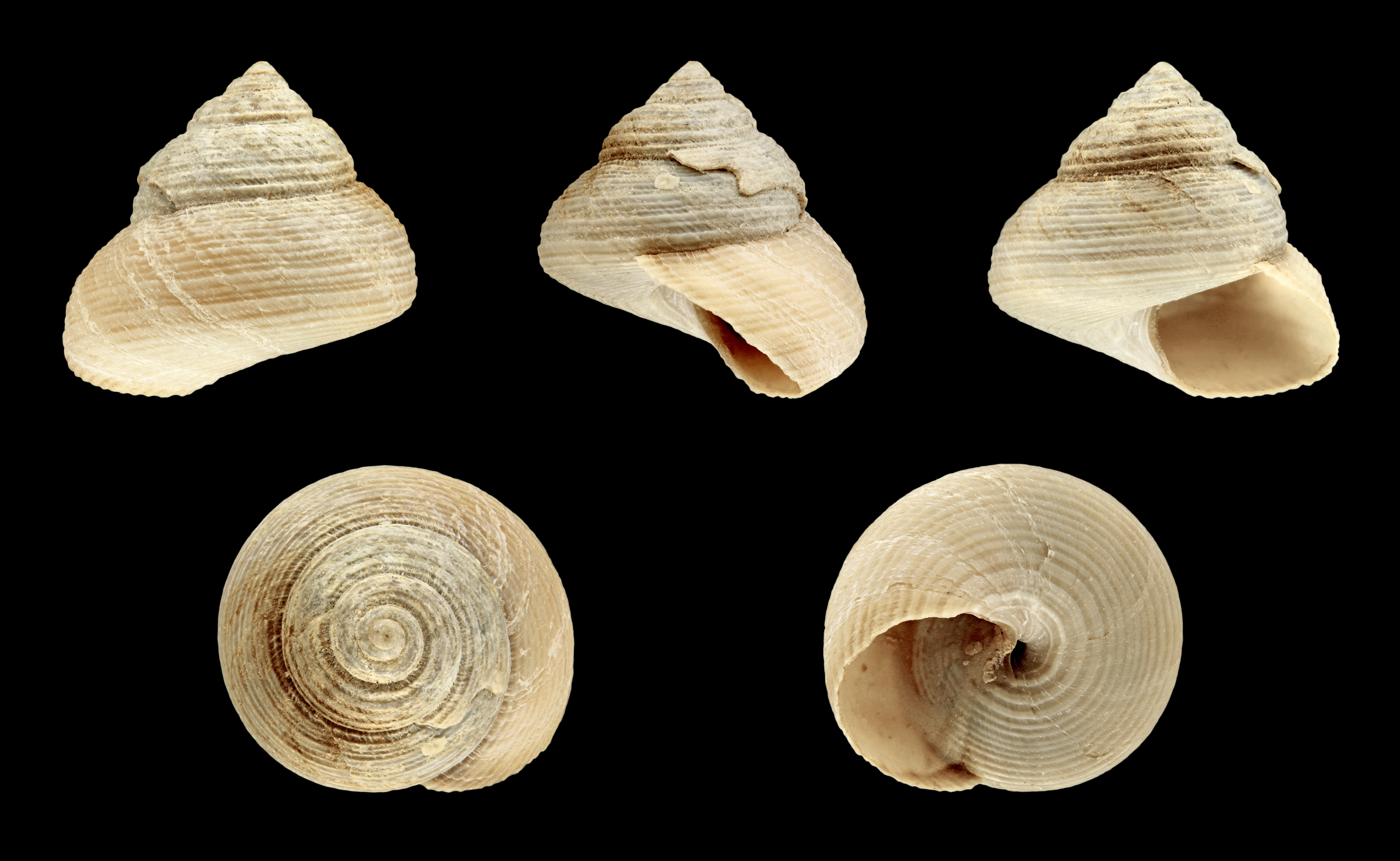
- Shell in multiple views of a Margarites sea snail
  Margarites
  - †Margarites moffiti – type locality for species
- †Margaritropites
  - †Margaritropites johnsoni
- †Margarosmilia
  - †Margarosmilia chalyana – tentative report
  - †Margarosmilia charlyana
  - †Margarosmilia confluens
  - †Margarosmilia richthofeni – or unidentified comparable form
- †Marginotruncana
  - †Marginotruncana sigali – or unidentified comparable form
- †Marshallites
  - †Marshallites cumshewaensis
- †Meekoceras
  - †Meekoceras gracilitatis
- †Meginoceras
- †Meleagrinella
- †Mesochara
- †Mesopuzosia
  - †Mesopuzosia indopacifica – or unidentified comparable form
- †Metapolygnathus
  - †Metapolygnathus primitius
- †Metasibirites
- †Metussuria
  - †Metussuria waageni
- †Microchara
- †Microdoma – tentative report
- †Microreticulatisporites
  - †Microreticulatisporites uniformis
- Milax
  - †Milax alienus – type locality for species
  - †Milax flexuosus – type locality for species
  - †Milax inflatus – type locality for species
- †Minetrigonia
  - †Minetrigonia cairnesi – or unidentified comparable form
  - †Minetrigonia suttonensis
- †Mirella
  - †Mirella borealis – or unidentified related form
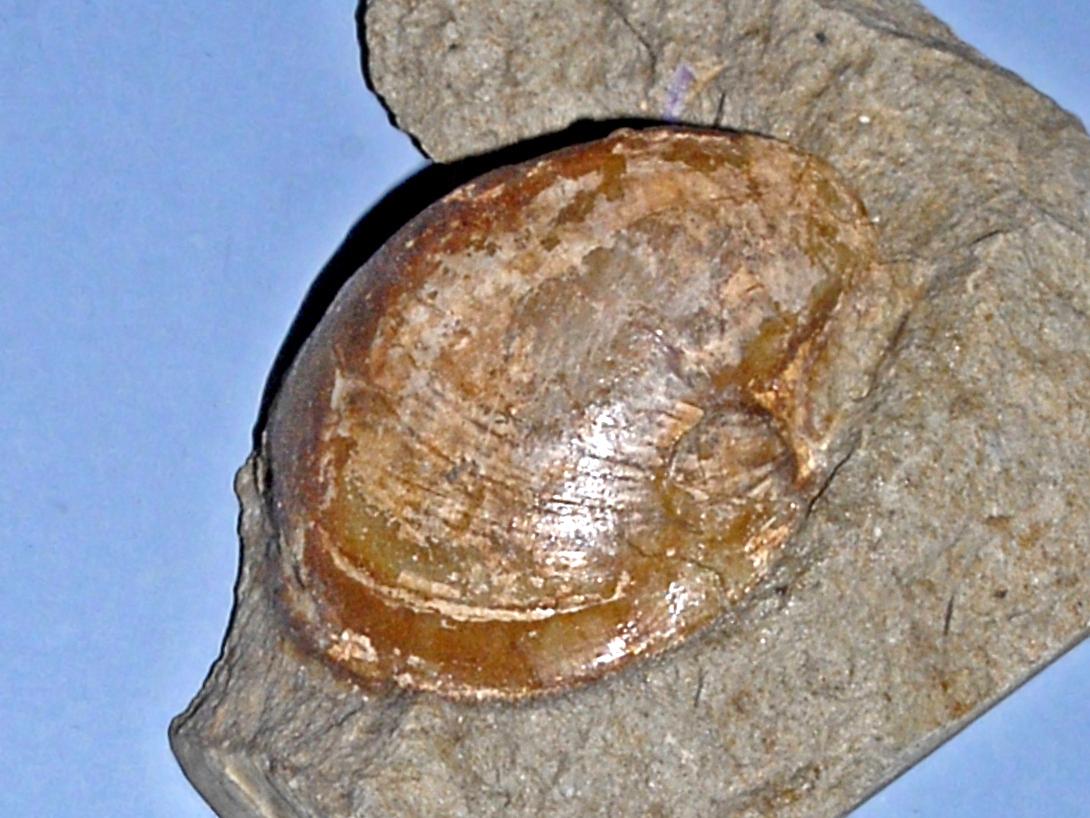
- Fossilized shell of a Modiolus, or horsemussel
  †Modiolus
- †Moffiites
  - †Moffiites robustus
- †Moffites
  - †Moffites robustus
- †Moffitites – type locality for genus
  - †Moffitites crassus
  - †Moffitites robustus – type locality for species
- †Mojsvaroceras – tentative report
- †Mongolocypris
- †Monotis
  - †Monotis alaskana – type locality for species
  - †Monotis anjuensis
  - †Monotis daonellaeformis
  - †Monotis haueri
  - †Monotis jakutica
  - †Monotis obtusicostata
  - †Monotis ochotica
  - †Monotis pachypleura
  - †Monotis pinensis – tentative report
  - †Monotis subcircularis
  - †Monotis typica
- †Montlivaltia
  - †Montlivaltia martini – type locality for species
- †Muelleritortis
  - †Muelleritortis cochleata
- †Mullerites
  - †Mullerites pleuroacanthitoides – or unidentified comparable form
- †Muramotoceras
  - †Muramotoceras yezoense – or unidentified related form
- †Murchisonia – tentative report
- †Myoconcha
  - †Myoconcha nana – or unidentified comparable form
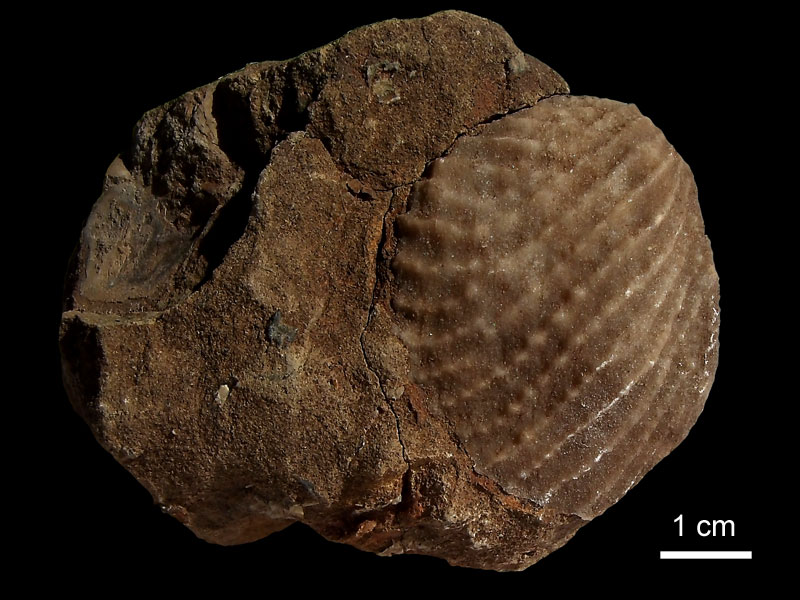
- Fossilized shell of the Jurassic-Cretaceous marine bivalve Myophorella
  †Myophorella
  - †Myophorella alaskaensis – type locality for species
  - †Myophorella argo
  - †Myophorella dawsoni
  - †Myophorella devexa
  - †Myophorella orientalis
  - †Myophorella packardi
  - †Myophorella tipperi
  - †Myophorella tuxedniensis – type locality for species
- †Myophoria
  - †Myophoria beringiana – type locality for species
- †Myphoria – tentative report
- †Mytiloceramus
  - †Mytiloceramus lucifer
- †Mytiloides
  - †Mytiloides stantoni
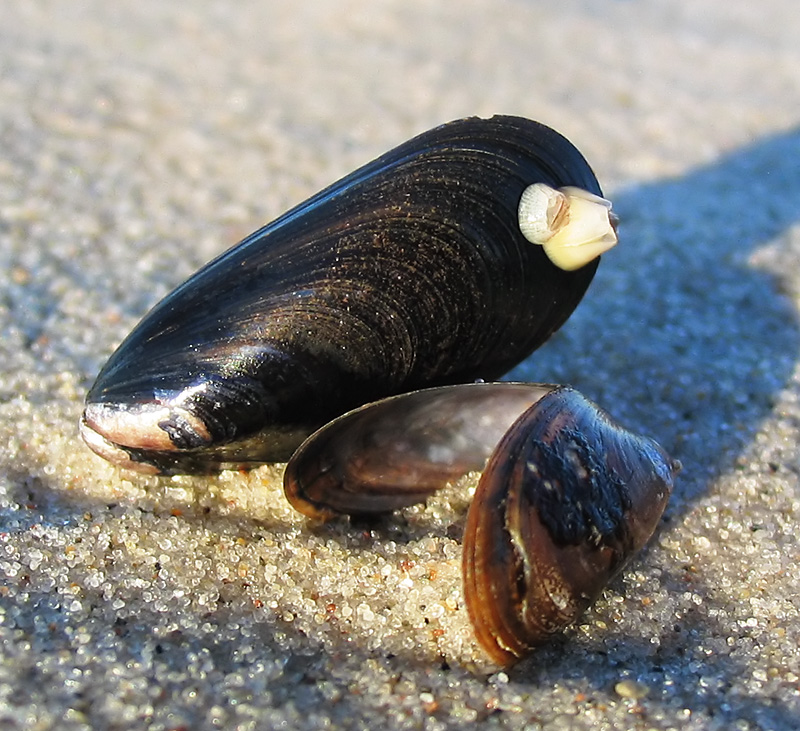
- Shells washed ashore of Mytilus mussels
  †Mytilus

== N ==
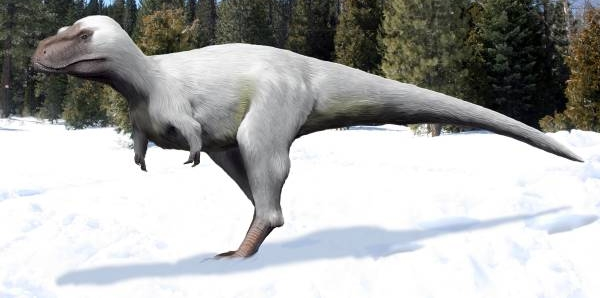
- Life restoration of the Late Cretaceous tyrannosaur Nanuqsaurus
  †Nanuqsaurus – type locality for genus
  - †Nanuqsaurus hoglundi – type locality for species
- Napora
  - †Napora aculeata – type locality for species
  - †Napora bukryi – or unidentified comparable form
  - †Napora milleri – type locality for species
  - †Napora pualensis – type locality for species
- †Nathorstites
  - †Nathorstites alaskanus – type locality for species
- Natica
  - †Natica spp.
- †Neogondelella
  - †Neogondelella jubata
- †Neogondolella
  - †Neogondolella navicula
  - †Neogondolella silberlingi
  - †Neogondolella tozeri
- †Neohimavatites
  - †Neohimavatites canadensis – or unidentified comparable form
- †Neophylloceras
  - †Neophylloceras hetonaiense
  - †Neophylloceras ramosum
  - †Neophylloceras seresitense
- †Neospathodus – report made of unidentified related form or using admittedly obsolete nomenclature
  - †Neospathodus conservativus
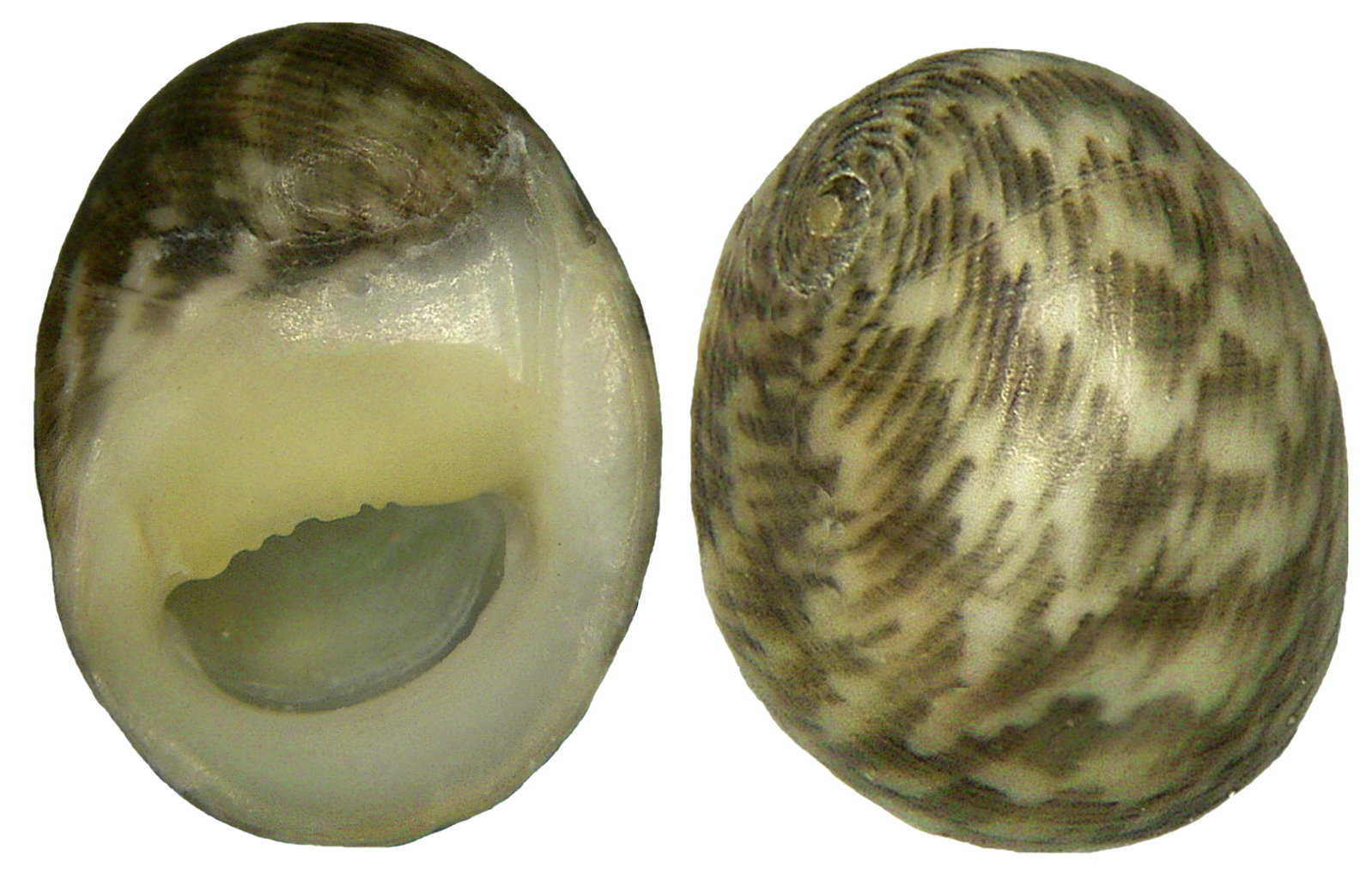
- Shell in multiple views of a Nerita polita sea snail
  Nerita – tentative report
- †Neritaria
  - †Neritaria nuetzeli – type locality for species
- Neritopsis
- †Nevadathalamia
  - †Nevadathalamia cylindrica
  - †Nevadathalamia minima – type locality for species
- †Nilsonia
  - †Nilsonia decursiva – or unidentified comparable form
  - †Nilsonia magnifolia
  - †Nilsonia menneri
  - †Nilsonia polymorpha
  - †Nilsonia serotina – or unidentified comparable form
- Nodosaria
- †Novispathodus
  - †Novispathodus waageni
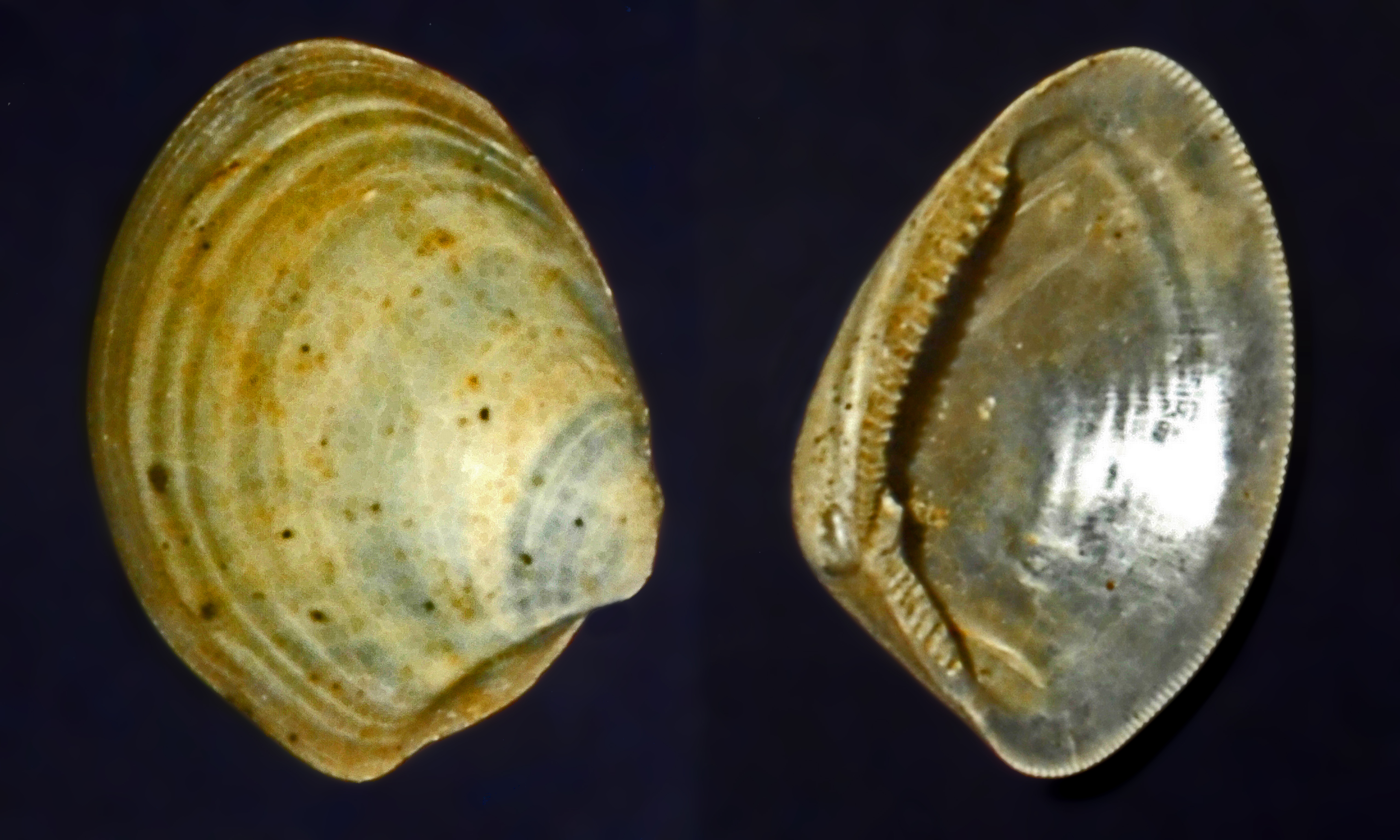
- Interior of a fossilized shell of the Early Ordovician-modern marine bivalve Nucula
  Nucula
  - †Nucula percrassa – or unidentified related form
- Nuculana – tentative report

== O ==
- †Ogmoconcha
  - †Ogmoconcha alaskaense – type locality for species
  - †Ogmoconcha limbata – or unidentified related form
  - †Ogmoconcha marquardti
  - †Ogmoconcha owthropensis
  - †Ogmoconcha tailleuri – type locality for species
  - †Ogmoconcha unicerata – type locality for species
- †Omphaloptycha
- †Onychiopsis
  - †Onychiopsis psilotoides – or unidentified comparable form
- †Ophiceras
  - †Ophiceras commune
  - †Ophiceras greenlandicum – or unidentified comparable form
- †Orbiculiforma
  - †Orbiculiforma iniqua – type locality for species
  - †Orbiculiforma multifora – or unidentified related form
- †Orbiculiformella – tentative report
  - †Orbiculiformella incognita – type locality for species
- Ostrea
- †Otoceras
  - †Otoceras boreale
- †Otoscaphites
  - †Otoscaphites teshioensis
- †Otozamites
  - †Otozamites bornholmiensis – tentative report
  - †Otozamites pterophylloides
- †Owenites
  - †Owenites koeneni – or unidentified comparable form
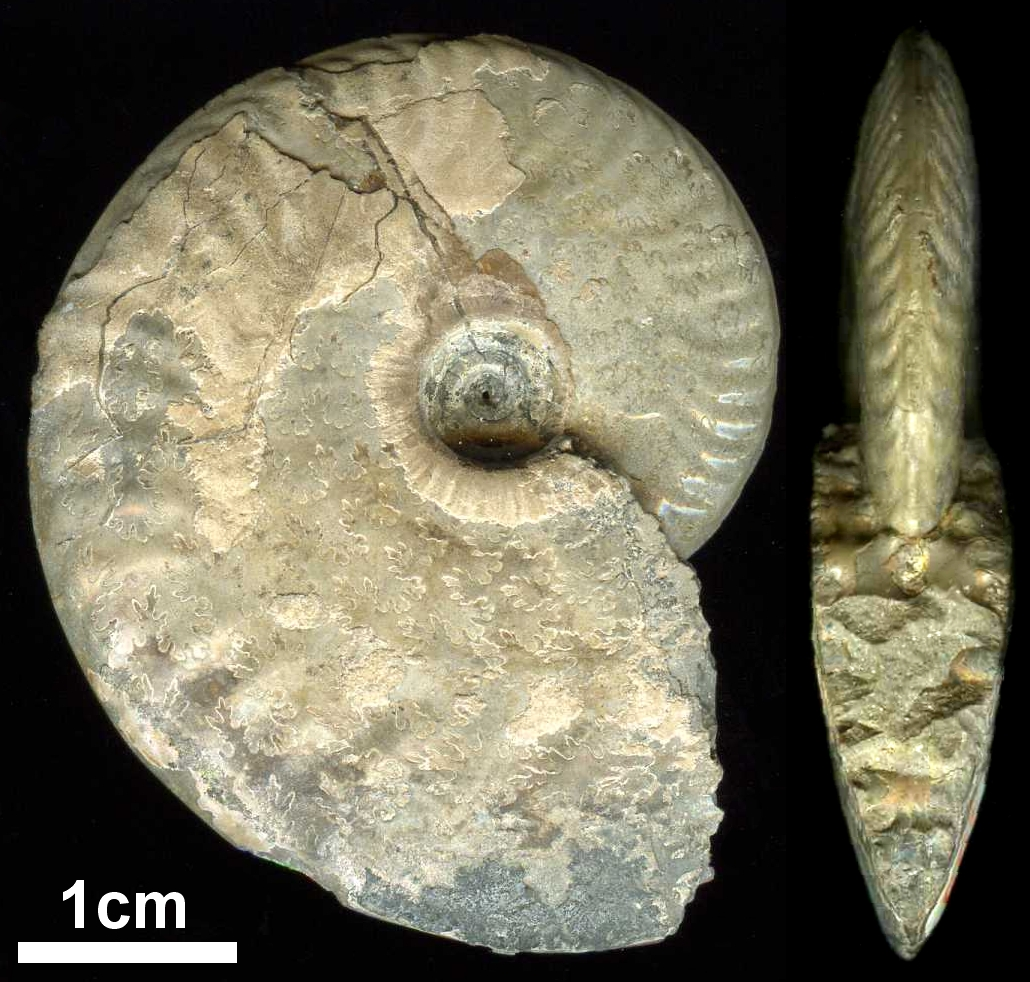
- Fossilized shell in multiple views of the Middle Jurassic ammonoid cephalopod Oxycerites
  †Oxycerites
  - †Oxycerites chinitnana – type locality for species
- †Oxytoma

== P ==
- †Pachydiscus
  - †Pachydiscus hazzardi – type locality for species
  - †Pachydiscus kamishakensis – type locality for species
  - †Pachydiscus obsoletiformis – type locality for species
  - †Pachydiscus ootacodensis
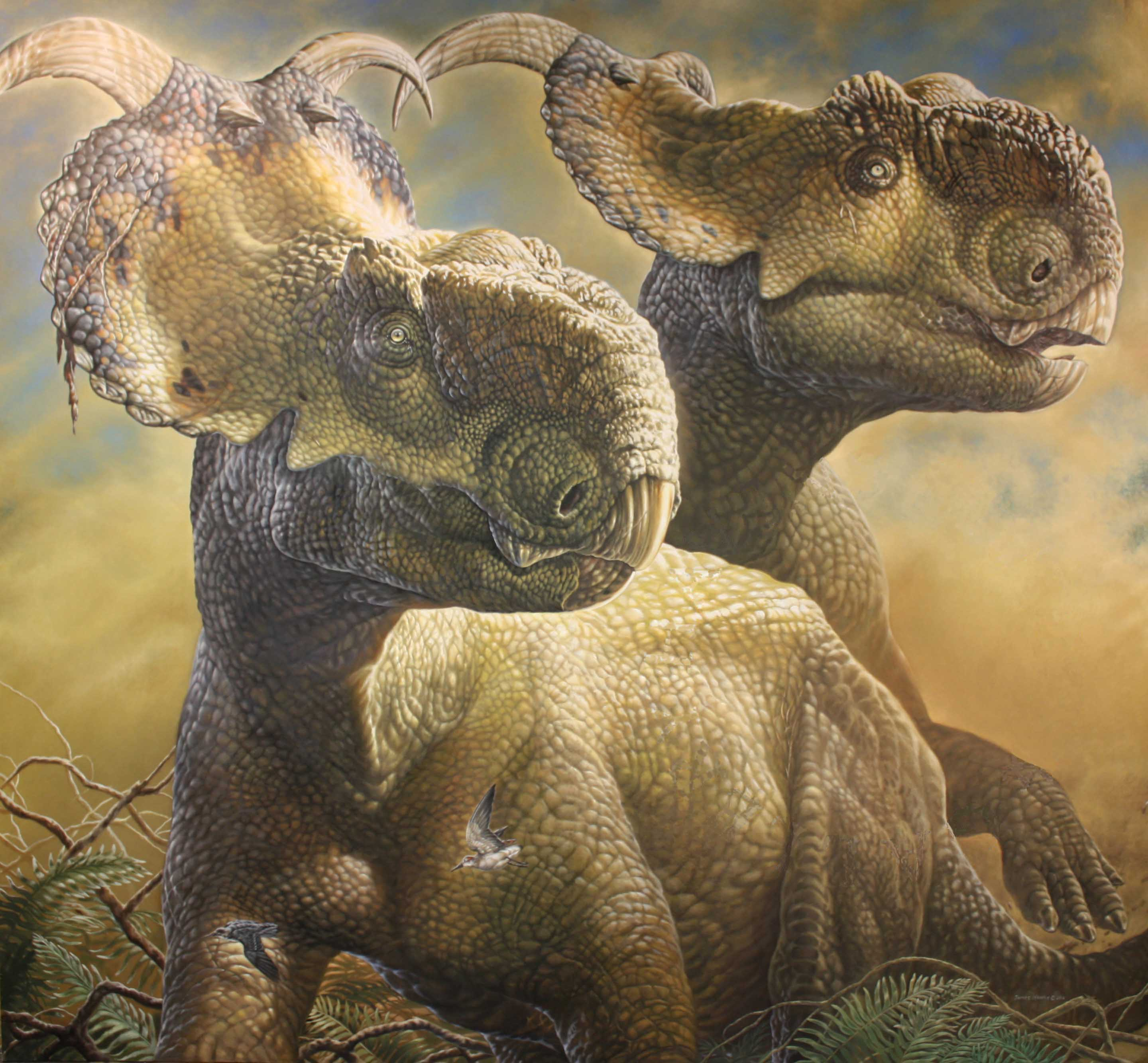
- Life restoration of two of the Late Cretaceous horned dinosaur Pachyrhinosaurus perotorum
  †Pachyrhinosaurus
  - †Pachyrhinosaurus perotorum – type locality for species
- †Pagiophyllum
  - †Pagiophyllum falcatum
  - †Pagiophyllum triangulare
- †Palaeastraea
  - †Palaeastraea borealis
  - †Palaeastraea descussata
- †Palaeopharus
  - †Palaeopharus buriji – or unidentified comparable form
- †Paleosaturnalis
- †Pamiroseris
  - †Pamiroseris borealis – type locality for species
  - †Pamiroseris meriani
  - †Pamiroseris rectilamellosa – or unidentified comparable form
- Panopea
  - †Panopea elongatissima – or unidentified comparable form
  - †Panopea kissoumi
- †Pantanellium
  - †Pantanellium fosteri – or unidentified related form
- †Paracadoceras
  - †Paracadoceras chisikense – type locality for species
  - †Paracadoceras moffiti – type locality for species
  - †Paracadoceras multiforme
  - †Paracadoceras tonniense – type locality for species
- †Paracuifia
  - †Paracuifia anomala
  - †Paracuifia jennieae – type locality for species
  - †Paracuifia smithi – type locality for species
- †Paracyclas – tentative report
  - †Paracyclas ellipticus – or unidentified comparable form
- †Paradelphinulopsis
  - †Paradelphinulopsis vallieri
- †Parallelodon
  - †Parallelodon cumshewaensis
  - †Parallelodon simillimus
- †Paranannites
  - †Paranannites aspenensis
  - †Paranannites slossi
- †Parareineckeia
  - †Parareineckeia hickersonensis – type locality for species
  - †Parareineckeia shelikofana – type locality for species
- †Parasilesites – type locality for genus
  - †Parasilesites bullatus – type locality for species
  - †Parasilesites irregularis – type locality for species
- †Parastraeomorpha
  - †Parastraeomorpha minuscula
- †Parataxodium
  - †Parataxodium wigginsii – or unidentified comparable form
- †Paratropites
- †Parauvanella
  - †Parauvanella ferdowsensis – or unidentified comparable form
- †Parkinsonia – tentative report
- †Paroecotraustes
- †Paronaella
  - †Paronaella bandyi – or unidentified related form
  - †Paronaella pessagnoi – type locality for species
  - †Paronaella pygmaea – or unidentified related form
  - †Paronaella venadoensis – or unidentified related form
  - †Paronaella venusta – type locality for species
- †Partschiceras
  - †Partschiceras ellipticum – type locality for species
  - †Partschiceras grantzi – type locality for species
  - †Partschiceras japonicum
  - †Partschiceras subobtusiforme
- Parvamussium – report made of unidentified related form or using admittedly obsolete nomenclature
- †Parvicingula
  - †Parvicingula blackhornensis
  - †Parvicingula praeacutum – type locality for species
  - †Parvicingula rothwelli – or unidentified related form
- †Patagiosites
  - †Patagiosites alaskensis – type locality for species
- Patella – tentative report
- †Pecten
  - †Pecten spp.
- †Pelekodites
  - †Pelekodites pelekus – or unidentified comparable form
- †Pentacrinus
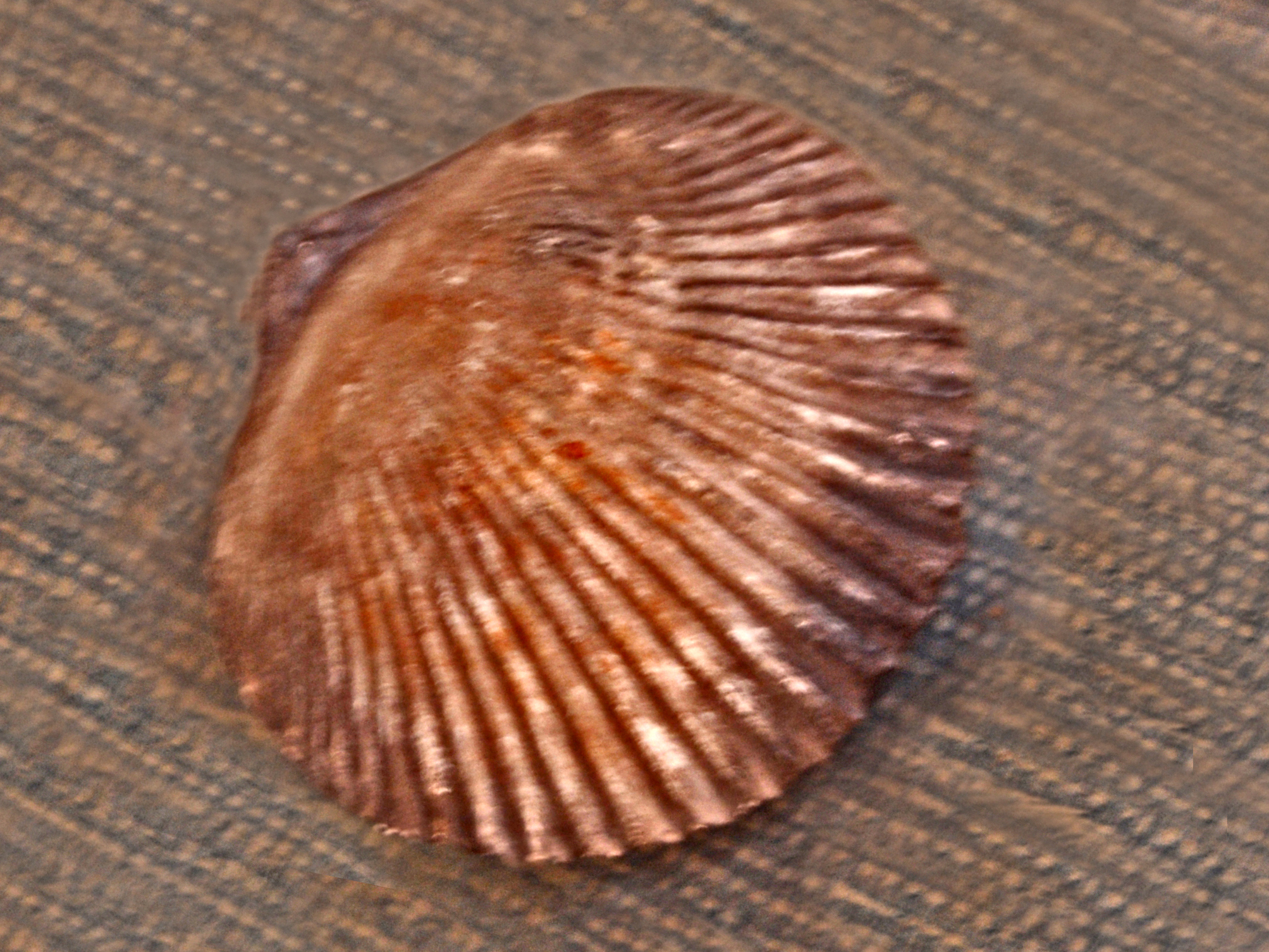
- Fossilized shell of the Cretaceous brachiopod Peregrinella
  †Peregrinella
  - †Peregrinella chisania – type locality for species
- †Peribositria – report made of unidentified related form or using admittedly obsolete nomenclature
  - †Peribositria mimer – tentative report
- †Perispyridium
  - †Perispyridium alinchakense
  - †Perispyridium dettermani
  - †Perispyridium nitidum
- †Phacelophyllia – report made of unidentified related form or using admittedly obsolete nomenclature
  - †Phacelophyllia suttonensis
- †Phacelostylophyllum
  - †Phacelostylophyllum zitteli
- †Phloioceras
- †Phoenicopsis
  - †Phoenicopsis angustifolia - or unidentified loosely related form
- Pholadomya
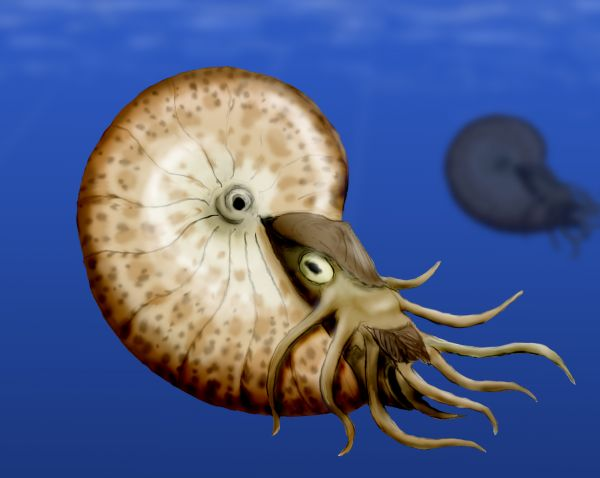
- Life restoration of the Early Jurassic-Late Cretaceous ammonoid cephalopod Phylloceras
  †Phylloceras
  - †Phylloceras bakeri – type locality for species
- †Phyllopachyceras
  - †Phyllopachyceras chitinanum – type locality for species
  - †Phyllopachyceras forbesianum
  - †Phyllopachyceras shastalense – or unidentified comparable form
- †Piarorhynchia – report made of unidentified related form or using admittedly obsolete nomenclature
  - †Piarorhynchia hamiltonensis – type locality for species
- †Pinacoceras
  - †Pinacoceras rex – or unidentified comparable form
- †Pinna
  - †Pinna expansa – or unidentified comparable form
- †Pinnigena
- †Pityolepis – tentative report
- †Pityophyllum
  - †Pityophyllum nordenskioldii - or unidentified loosely related form
  - †Pityophyllum staratschinii - or unidentified loosely related form
- †Pityostrobus
  - †Pityostrobus piceoides – or unidentified comparable form
- †Placites
- †Placunopsis – tentative report
- †Plagiostoma
- †Planolites – tentative report
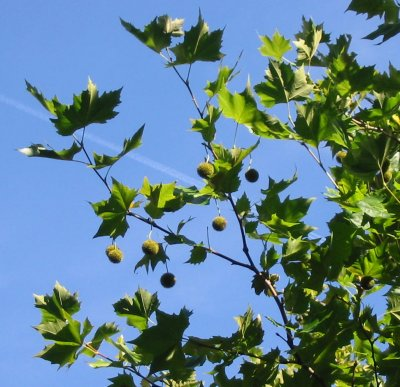
- Leaves and fruit of a living Platanus, or plane tree
  Platanus
  - †Platanus louravetlanica
- †Platyceras
- †Pleuroacanthites
  - †Pleuroacanthites mulleri - or unidentified loosely related form
- †Pleuromya
  - †Pleuromya carlottensis
- †Pleuronautilus
  - †Pleuronautilus alaskensis – type locality for species
- †Pleurophorus – report made of unidentified related form or using admittedly obsolete nomenclature
  - †Pleurophorus overbecki – type locality for species
- Pleurotomaria
- Plicatula
  - †Plicatula perimbricata – or unidentified comparable form
  - †Plicatula periobricata – or unidentified comparable form
- †Podozamites
  - †Podozamites eichwaldii - or unidentified loosely related form
  - †Podozamites spp.
- †Polycingulatisporites
  - †Polycingulatisporites triangularis
- †Posidonia
- †Poulpus
  - †Poulpus transitus
- †Praeparvicingula
  - †Praeparvicingula communis – type locality for species
  - †Praeparvicingula decora – or unidentified related form
  - †Praeparvicingula inornata – type locality for species
  - †Praeparvicingula prisca – type locality for species
- †Proarcestes
  - †Proarcestes shastensis
- †Procerites
  - †Procerites irregularis – type locality for species
- †Procyclolites
- †Projuvavites
  - †Projuvavites brockensis
- †Promathildia – tentative report
- †Proptychites
  - †Proptychites rosenkrantzei – or unidentified comparable form
- †Protocardia
- †Protocula
  - †Protocula bassetti
- †Protorcula
  - †Protorcula bassetti – type locality for species
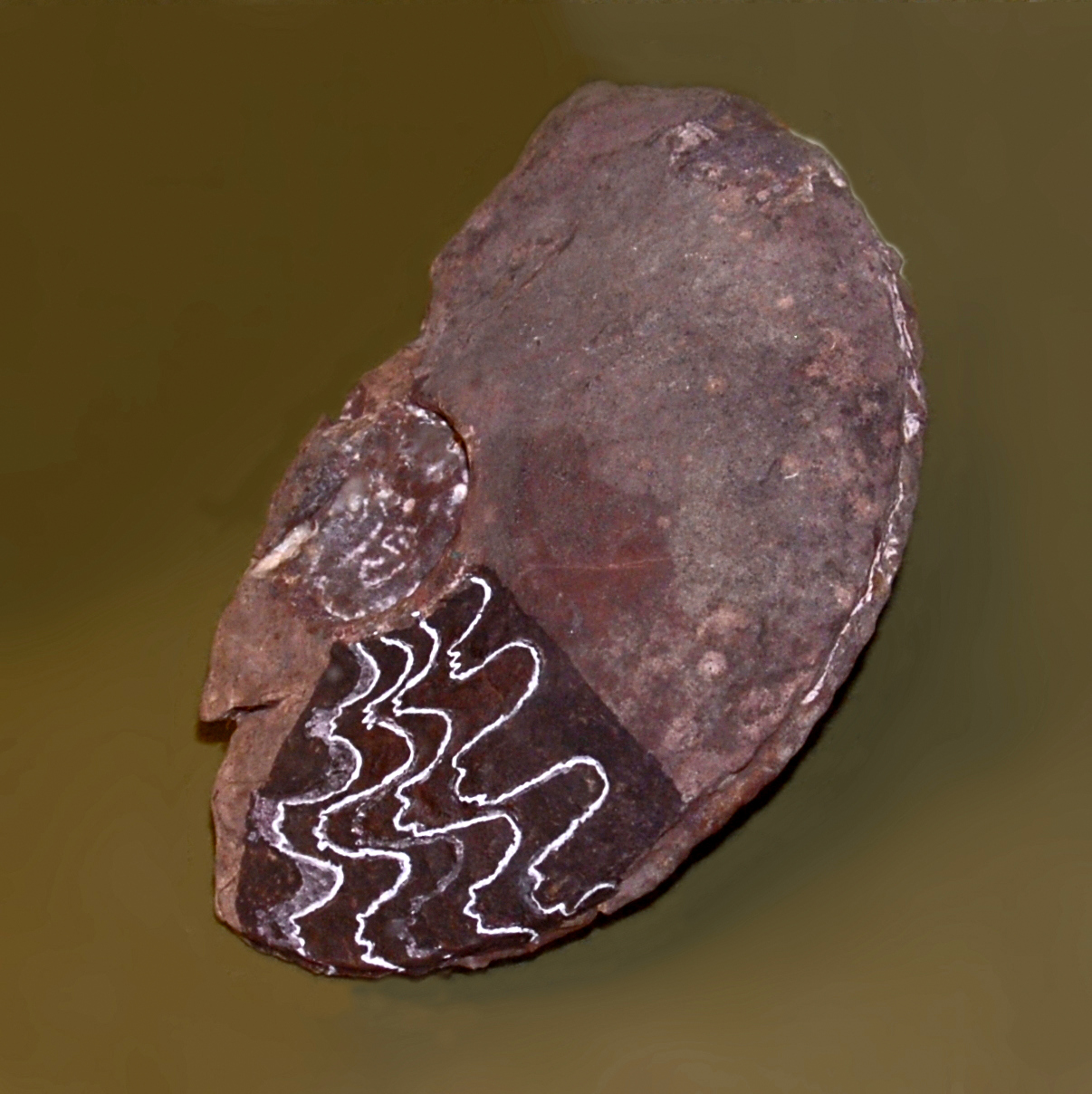
- Fossilized shell of the Triassic ammonoid cephalopod Protrachyceras
  †Protrachyceras
- †Pseudammatoceras
  - †Pseudammatoceras benneri – or unidentified related form
- †Pseudaptetoceras
  - †Pseudaptetoceras klimakomphalum
- †Pseudobythocypris
- †Pseudocrucella
  - †Pseudocrucella plana – type locality for species
  - †Pseudocrucella prava – type locality for species
- †Pseudocycas
- †Pseudodictromitria
  - †Pseudodictromitria carpatica
- †Pseudoencurtis
- †Pseudoheliodiscus
  - †Pseudoheliodiscus viejoensis
- †Pseudolioceras
  - †Pseudolioceras compactile – or unidentified comparable form
  - †Pseudolioceras costistriatum – type locality for species
  - †Pseudolioceras fastigatum – type locality for species
  - †Pseudolioceras lythense – or unidentified comparable form
  - †Pseudolioceras whiteavesi
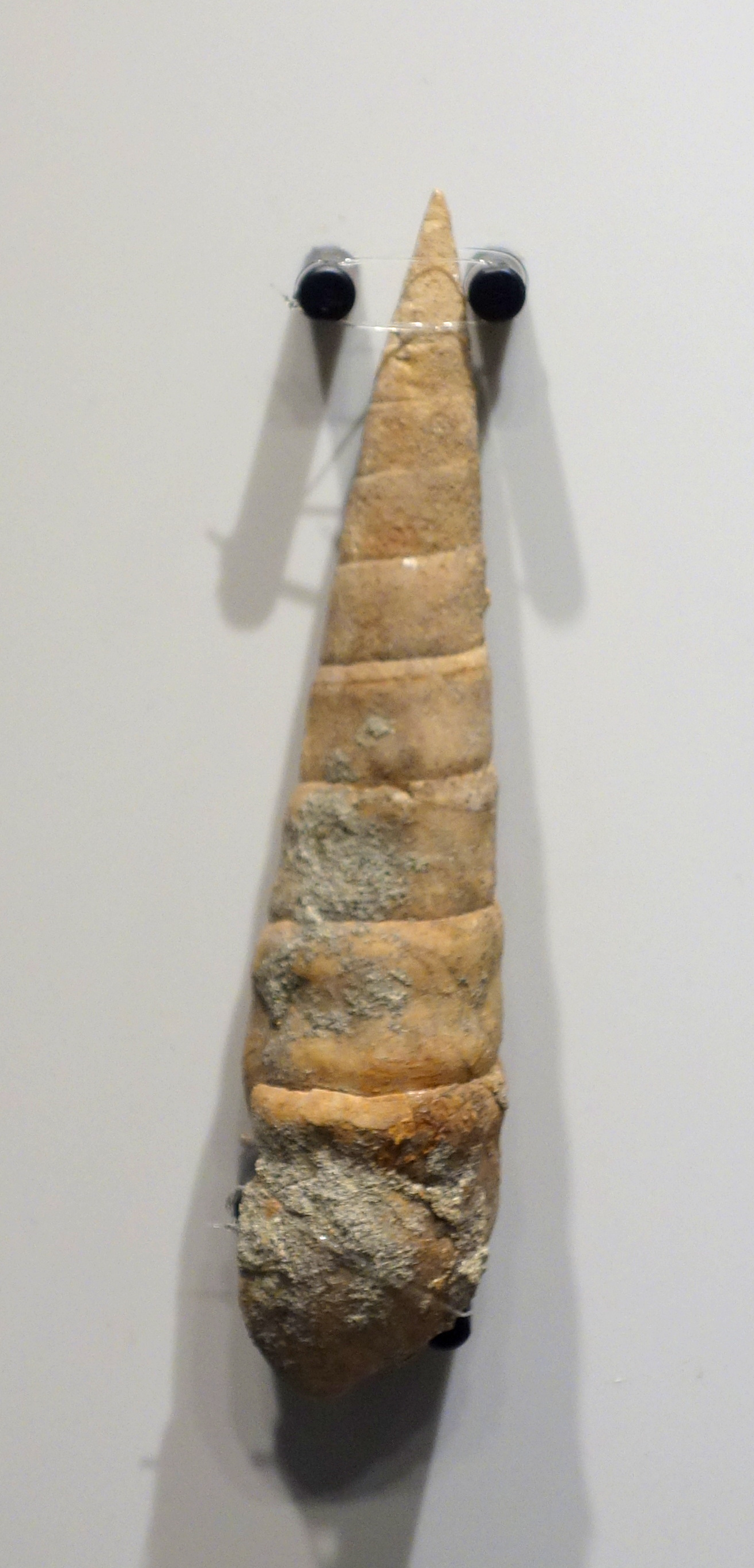
- Fossilized shell of a Pseudomelania sea snail
  †Pseudomelania – tentative report
- †Pseudomonotis – tentative report
- †Pseudophyllites
  - †Pseudophyllites indra
- †Pseudosageceras
- †Pseudoseptifer
- †Pseudospondylospira – type locality for genus
  - †Pseudospondylospira perplexa – type locality for species
- †Pseudostylosphaera
  - †Pseudostylosphaera coccostyle
  - †Pseudostylosphaera helicatum
  - †Pseudostylosphaera japonica
  - †Pseudostylosphaera nazarovi
- †Pseudotoites
  - †Pseudotoites argentinus – or unidentified comparable form
  - †Pseudotoites transatlanticus – or unidentified comparable form
- †Pseudoxybeloceras – tentative report
- †Pteria
- †Pterophyllum
  - †Pterophyllum aequale
  - †Pterophyllum rajmahalense
- †Ptychoceras
  - †Ptychoceras laeve – or unidentified comparable form
- †Ptyctothyris – report made of unidentified related form or using admittedly obsolete nomenclature
  - †Ptyctothyris stephani
- Purpurina
  - †Purpurina gravinaensis – type locality for species
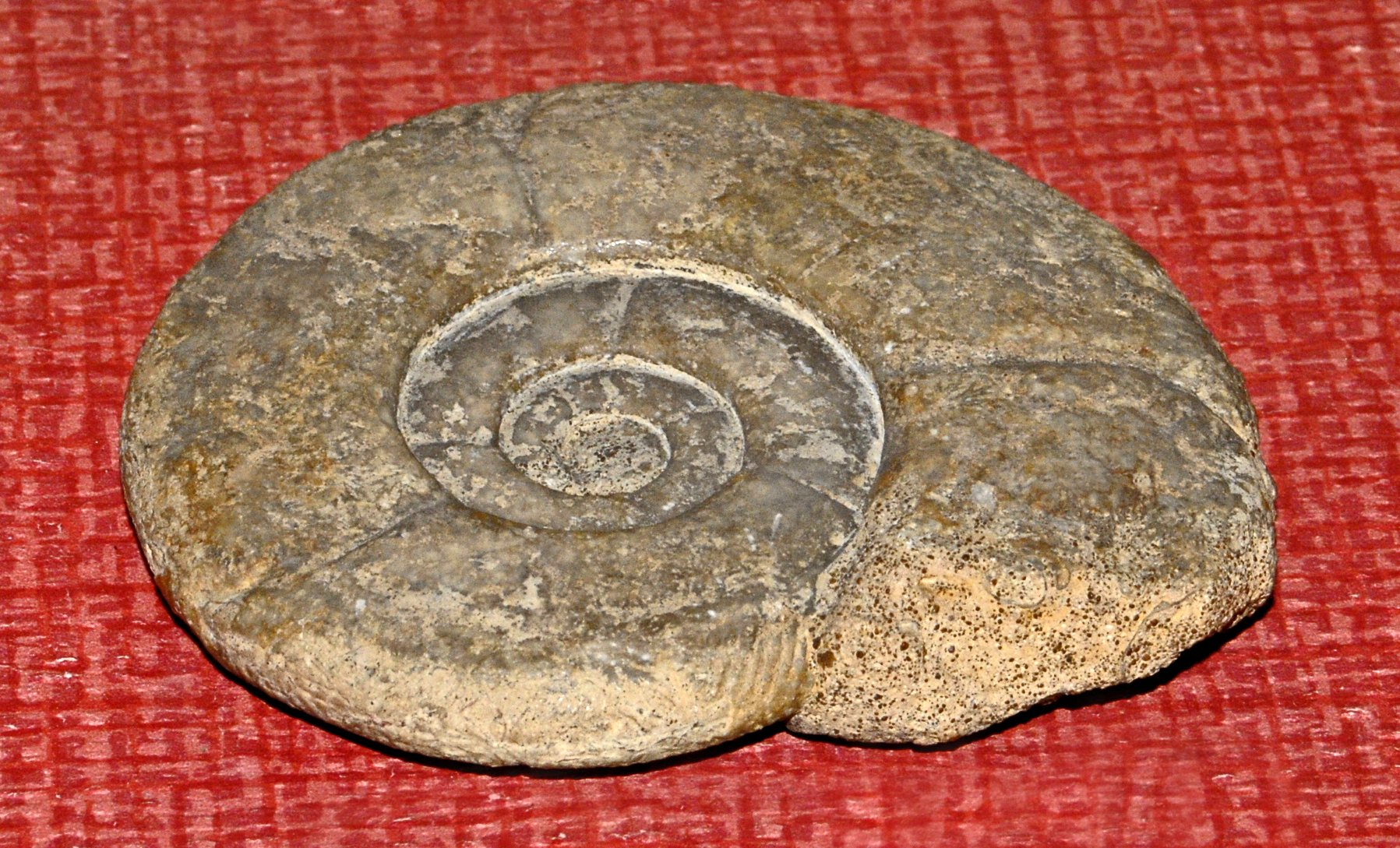
- Fossilized shell of the Early-Late Cretaceous ammonoid cephalopod Puzosia
  †Puzosia
  - †Puzosia alaskana – type locality for species
- †Puzosigella
  - †Puzosigella perrinsmithi – or unidentified comparable form
  - †Puzosigella spp.
  - †Puzosigella taffi – or unidentified comparable form

== Q ==
- †Quercoidites
  - †Quercoidites genustriatus

== R ==
- †Recytella
- †Reineckeites
  - †Reineckeites stuebeli – or unidentified comparable form
- †Reineckia
  - †Reineckia stuebeli – or unidentified comparable form
- †Retiophyllia
  - †Retiophyllia caespitosa
  - †Retiophyllia clathrata – type locality for species
  - †Retiophyllia dawsoni
  - †Retiophyllia delicatula
  - †Retiophyllia fenestrata
  - †Retiophyllia frechi – or unidentified comparable form
  - †Retiophyllia norica
  - †Retiophyllia obtusa
  - †Retiophyllia oppeli
  - †Retiophyllia parviseptum
  - †Retiophyllia robusta – or unidentified comparable form
  - †Retiophyllia tenuicosta
- Rhombocythere
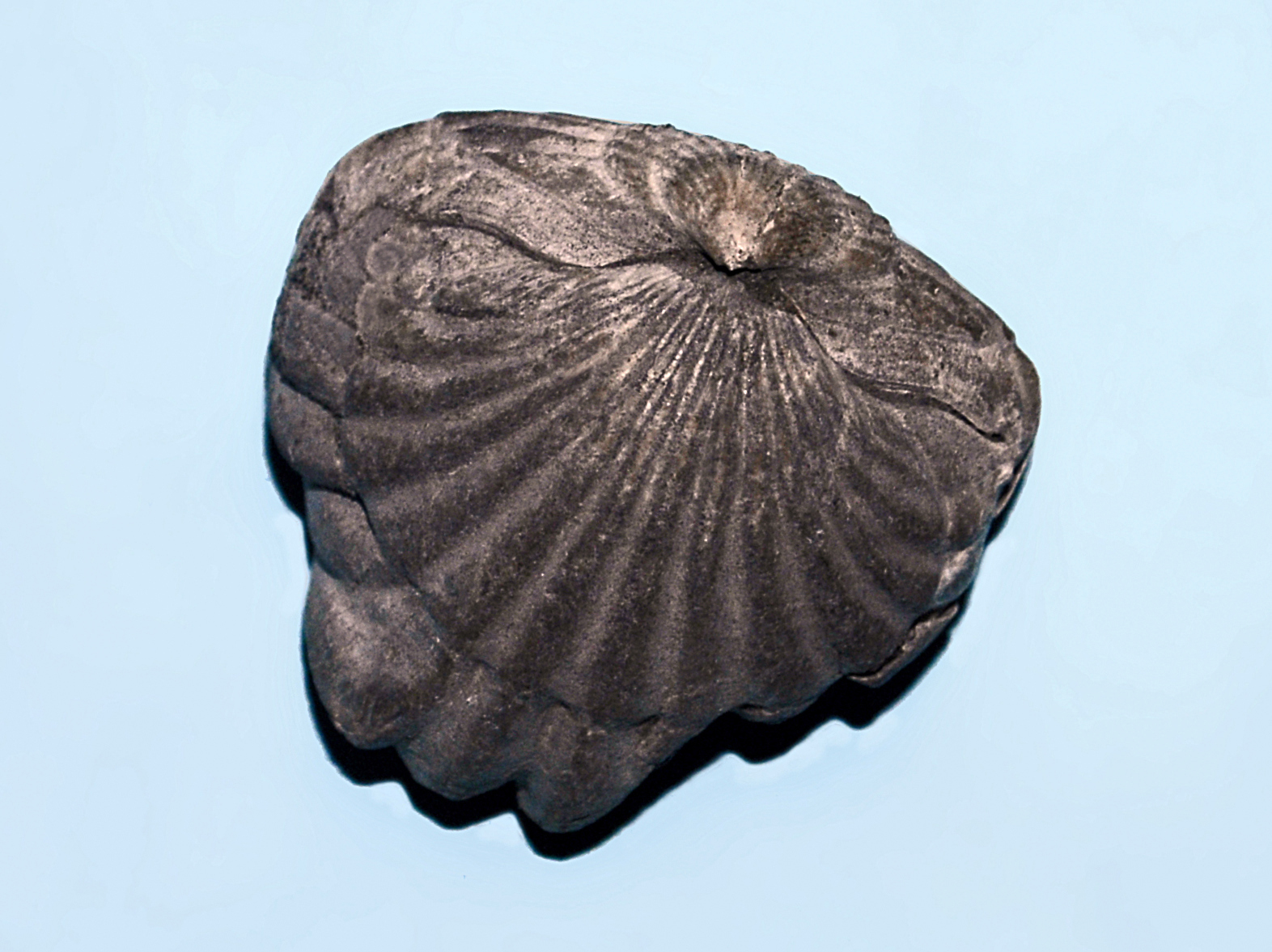
- Fossilized shell of the Silurian-Eocene articulate brachiopod Rhynchonella
  †Rhynchonella
  - †Rhynchonella blackwelderi – type locality for species

== S ==
- †Sagenites – tentative report
- †Sagenopteris – tentative report
- †Sarla
  - †Sarla vetusta
- †Saurexallopus
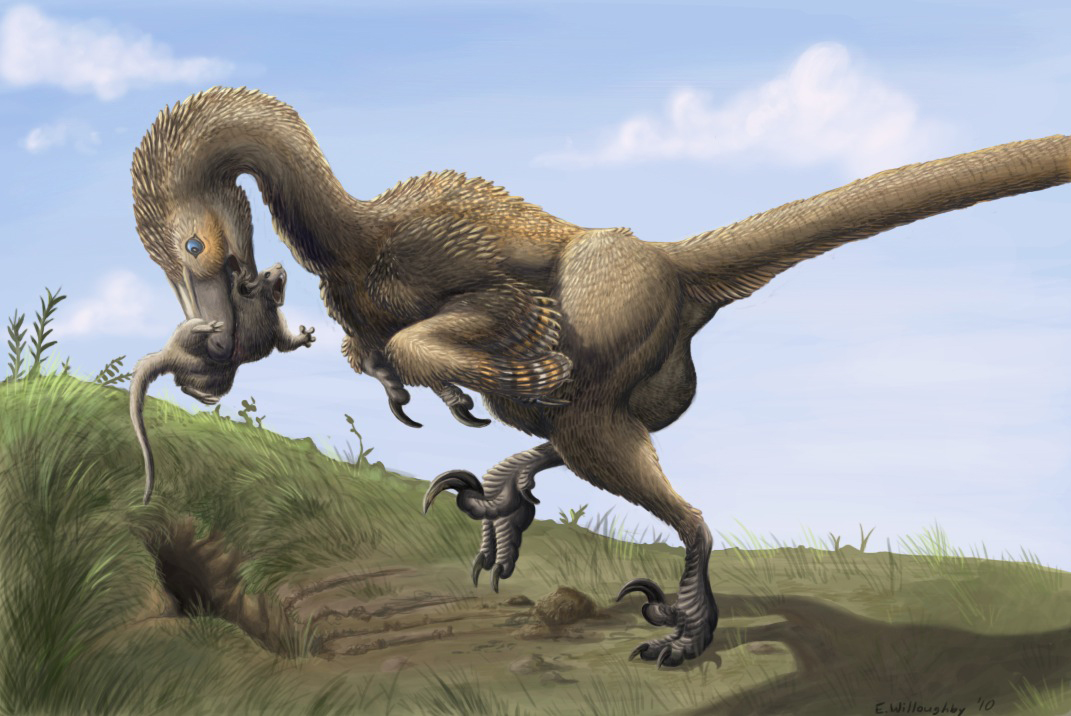
- Life restoration of the Late Cretaceous dromaeosaurid Saurornitholestes preying upon a multituberculate mammal
  †Saurornitholestes
  - †Saurornitholestes langstoni
- †Saxoceras – tentative report
  - †Saxoceras portlocki - or unidentified loosely related form
- †Scaphites
- †Scheffleraephyllum
  - †Scheffleraephyllum venustum
- †Schizodus – tentative report
  - †Schizodus appressus – or unidentified comparable form
- †Sciponoceras
- Scurria – tentative report
- †Seirocrinus
  - †Seirocrinus subangularis
- †Septocardia
  - †Septocardia pascoensis – or unidentified comparable form
  - †Septocardia peruviana – or unidentified comparable form
- Serpula
- †Seymourites
  - †Seymourites abruptus
  - †Seymourites alticostatus – type locality for species
  - †Seymourites gittinsi
  - †Seymourites ingrahami
  - †Seymourites mcevoyi
  - †Seymourites multus
  - †Seymourites plenus
  - †Seymourites tychonis
- †Siemiradzkia – or unidentified comparable form
  - †Siemiradzkia aurigera
- †Sigmopollis
  - †Sigmopollis psilatus
- †Simbirskites
- †Sirenites
  - †Sirenites hayesi – type locality for species
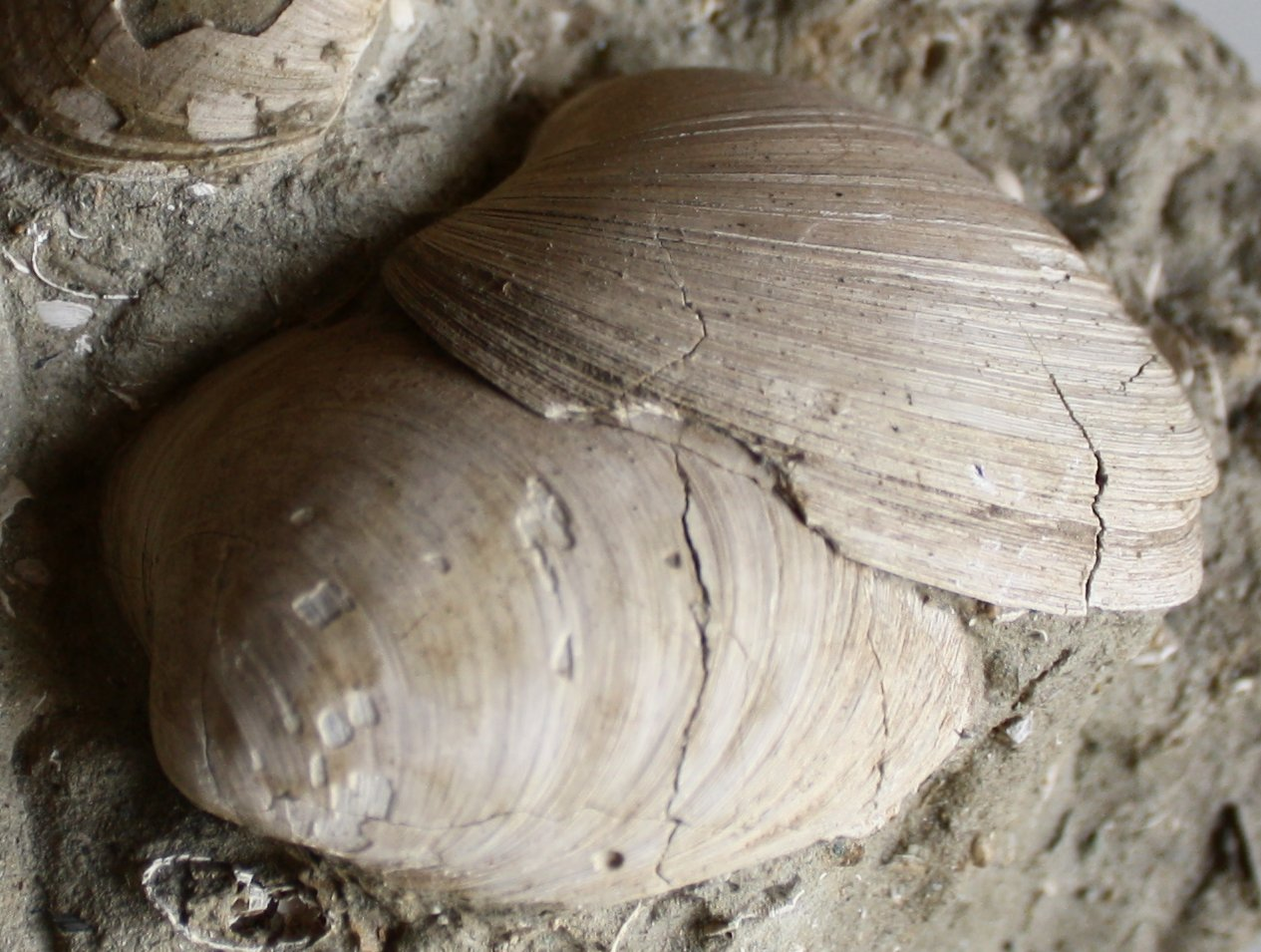
- Fossilized shells of the marine bivalve Solecurtus
  Solecurtus – tentative report
  - †Solecurtus chapmani – type locality for species
- Solemya – tentative report
- †Solenopora
- †Sonninia
  - †Sonninia alaskensis – type locality for species
  - †Sonninia bifurcata – type locality for species
- †Spatulites
  - †Spatulites spatians – or unidentified related form
- †Sphaerocladiscites
  - †Sphaerocladiscites martini – type locality for species
  - †Sphaerocladiscites mendenhalli – type locality for species
- †Sphaeroidochyria – tentative report
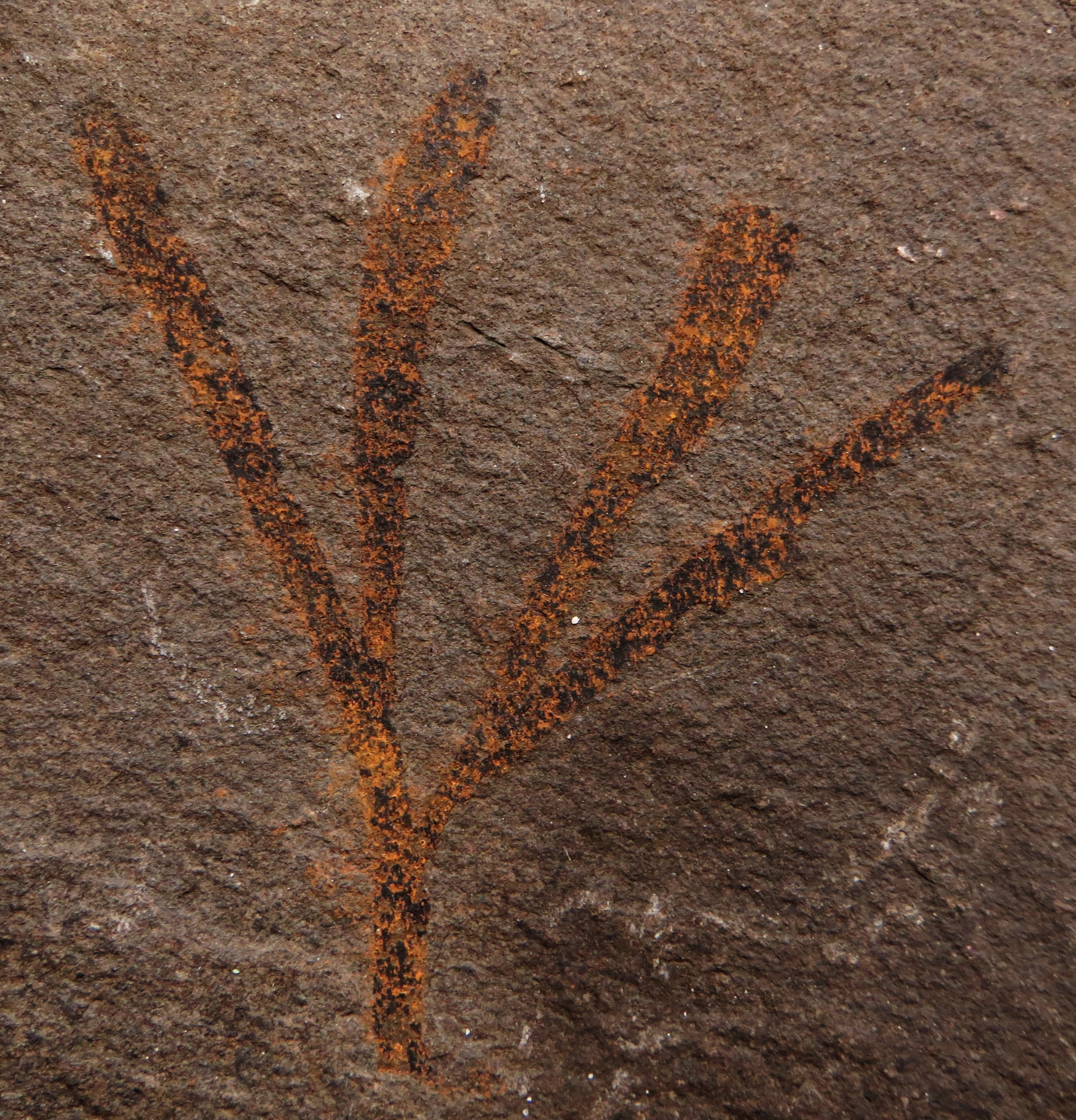
- Fossilized leaf of the Late Cretaceous ginkgo relative Sphenobaiera
  †Sphenobaiera
  - †Sphenobaiera biloba - or unidentified loosely related form
  - †Sphenobaiera czekanowskiana - or unidentified loosely related form
  - †Sphenobaiera longifolia - or unidentified loosely related form
- †Spinidelphinulopsis
  - †Spinidelphinulopsis whaleni
- †Spiriferina
  - †Spiriferina borealis – tentative report
  - †Spiriferina yukonensis – type locality for species
- †Spirocyclina – tentative report
- †Spirogmoceras
  - †Spirogmoceras shastense – or unidentified comparable form
- †Spondylospira
  - †Spondylospira lewesensis
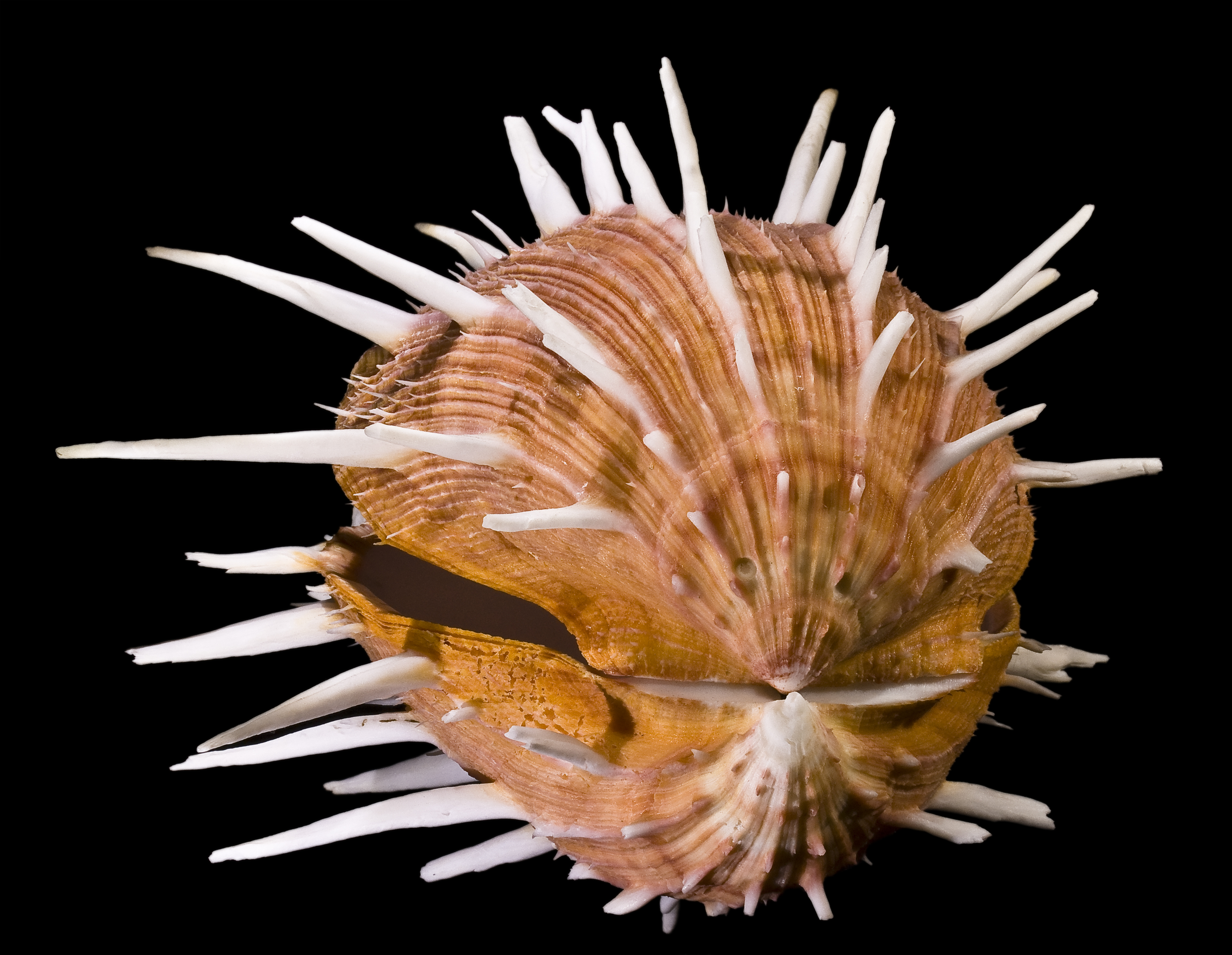
- Shell of a Spondylus, or spiny oyster
  Spondylus – tentative report
- †Spongiomorpha
  - †Spongiomorpha acyclica
  - †Spongiomorpha gibbosa
  - †Spongiomorpha ramosa
- †Steinmannites
- †Stellispongia
  - †Stellispongia subsphaerica – or unidentified comparable form
- †Stenocadoceras
  - †Stenocadoceras bowserense – type locality for species
  - †Stenocadoceras iniskinense – type locality for species
  - †Stenocadoceras multicostatum – type locality for species
  - †Stenocadoceras pomeroyense – type locality for species
  - †Stenocadoceras stenoloboide
  - †Stenocadoceras striatum – type locality for species
- †Stenorachis
  - †Stenorachis striolatus
- †Stereisporites
  - †Stereisporites regium
- †Stromatomorpha
  - †Stromatomorpha californica
- †Stylophyllum
  - †Stylophyllum pygmaeum
- †Sunrisites – tentative report

== T ==
- †Taeniopteris – tentative report
- †Tancredia
  - †Tancredia kurupana – type locality for species
  - †Tancredia stelcki
- Terebratula
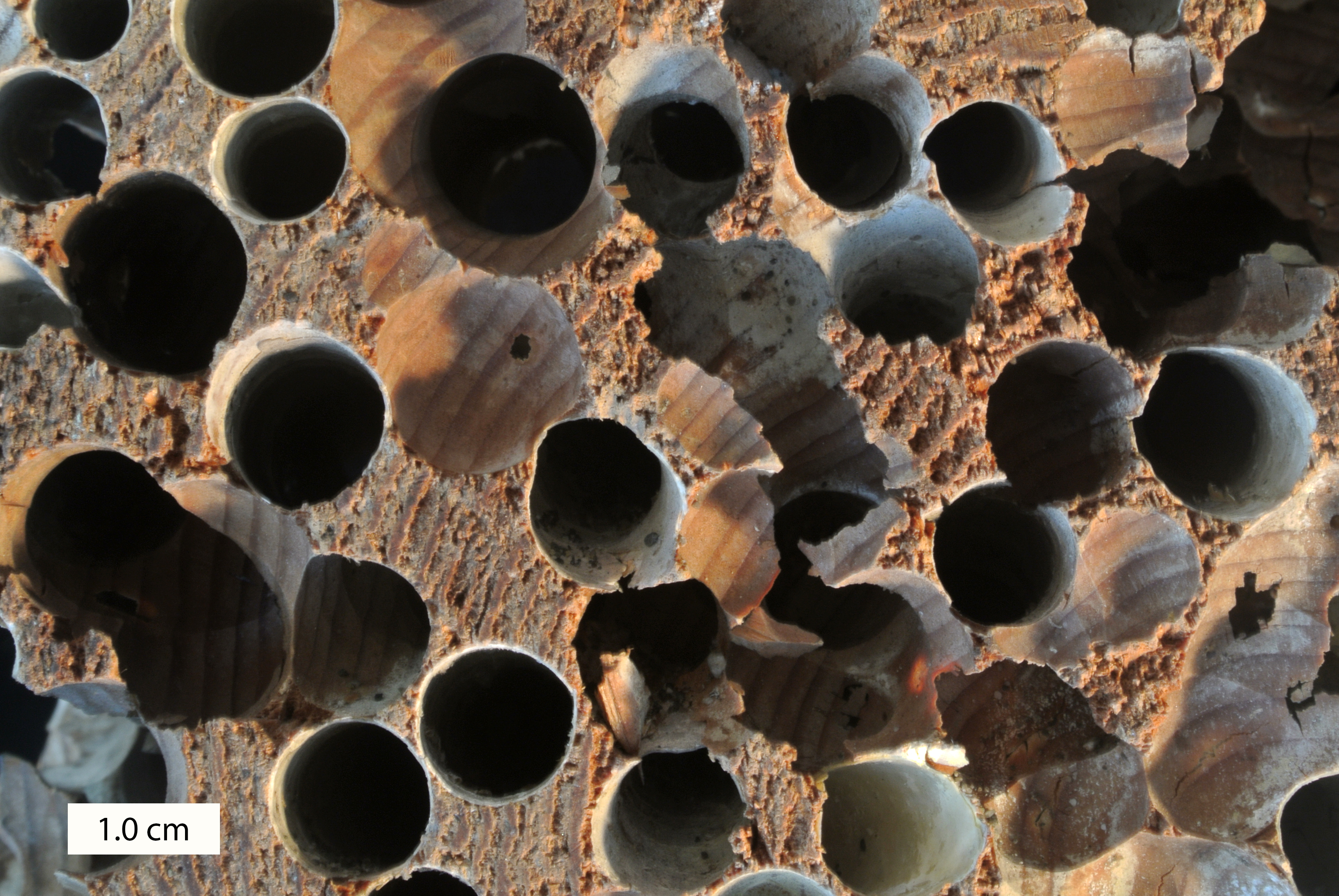
- Fossils of the ichnogenus Teredolites, produced by bivalves boring into wood.
  Teredolites
- †Tetragonites
  - †Tetragonites glabrus
  - †Tetragonites kiliani
  - †Tetragonites timotheanus – or unidentified related form
- †Thallites
  - †Thallites arctica - or unidentified loosely related form
- †Thamnasteria
  - †Thamnasteria borealis
  - †Thamnasteria smithi
- †Thecosmilia – report made of unidentified related form or using admittedly obsolete nomenclature
- Thracia
  - †Thracia semiplanata
  - †Thracia stelcki
- †Tosapecten – tentative report
- †Trachyceras – tentative report
- †Triassocampe
  - †Triassocampe deweveri
- †Triassocypris
- †Trichites – report made of unidentified related form or using admittedly obsolete nomenclature
- †Tricolpopollenites
  - †Tricolpopollenites parvulus
- †Trigonarca – or unidentified comparable form
  - †Trigonarca tumida
- †Trigonia
- †Trigonodus – tentative report
- †Tritrabs
  - †Tritrabs worzeli – or unidentified related form
- Trochocyathus – tentative report
- Trochus
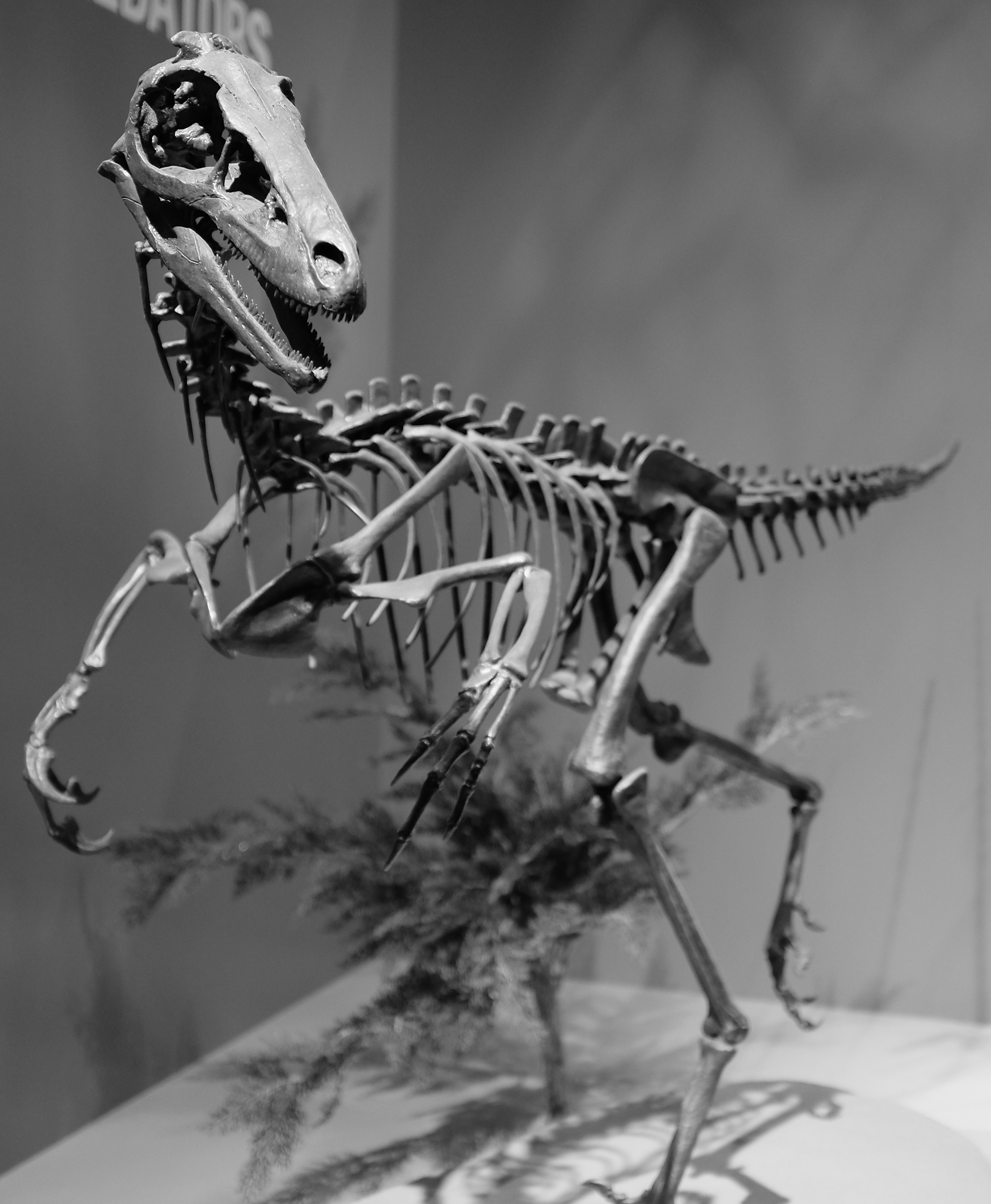
- Fossilized skeleton found in Alaska of the Late Cretaceous troodontid Troodon
  †Troodon
  - †Troodon formosus
- †Tropites
  - †Tropites stantoni – type locality for species
- †Trudopollis
  - †Trudopollis meekeri
- †Trypanostylus – tentative report
- †Turanta – tentative report
  - †Turanta unica – type locality for species
- Turbo – tentative report
- Turritella – tentative report
- †Tutcheria
  - †Tutcheria densestriata

== U ==
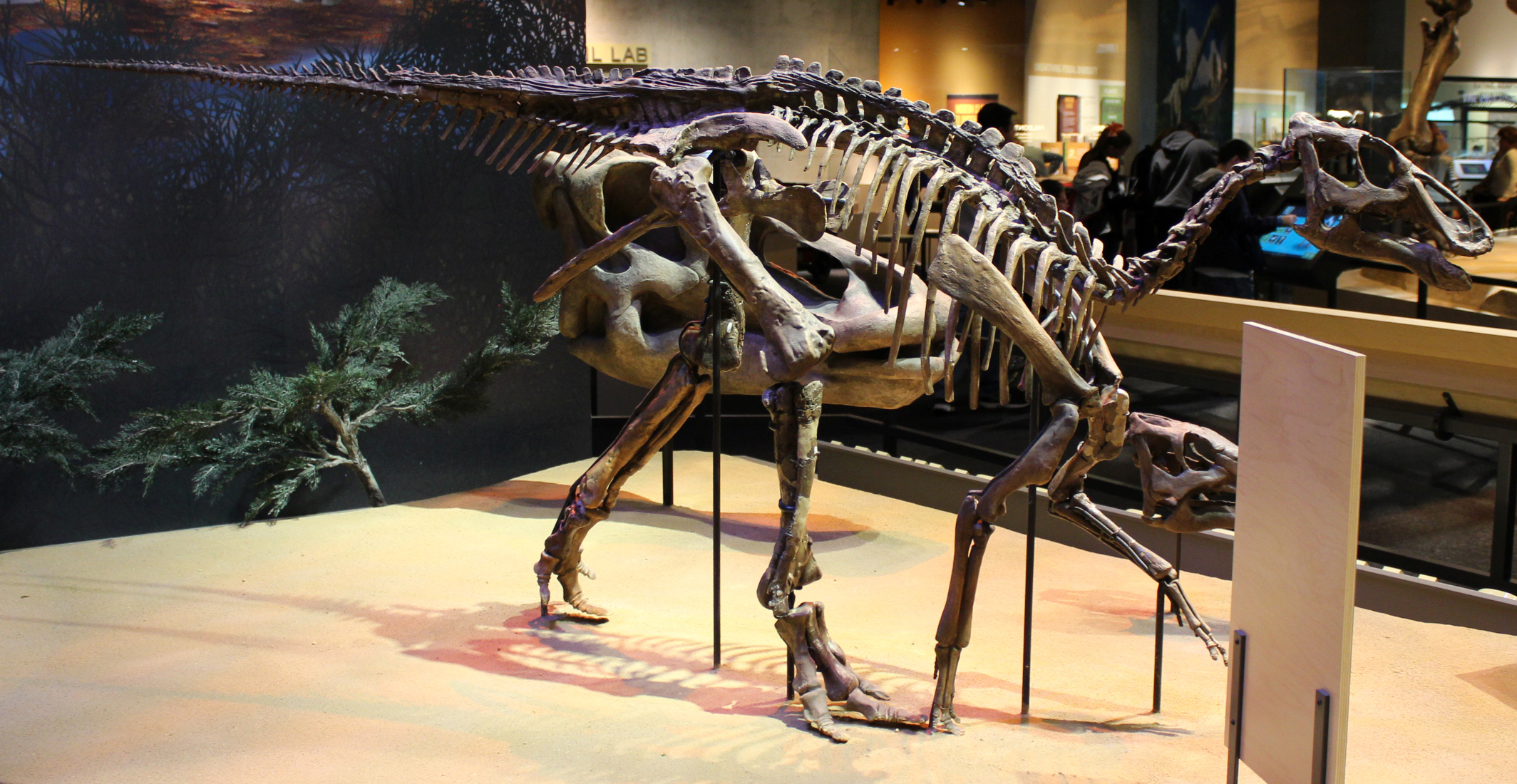
- Fossilized skeleton found in Alaska of the Late Cretaceous duck-billed dinosaur Ugrunaaluk
  †Ugrunaaluk – type locality for genus
  - †Ugrunaaluk kuukpikensis – type locality for species
- †Unnuakomys – type locality for genus
  - †Unnuakomys hutchisoni – type locality for species

== V ==
- Vaginulina
- †Valdedorsella – tentative report
  - †Valdedorsella whiteavesi – type locality for species
- †Variamusiua – tentative report
- †Vaugonia
  - †Vaugonia doroschini
  - †Vaugonia imlayi – type locality for species
- †Vermiceras
  - †Vermiceras rursicostatum – or unidentified comparable form
- †Vinassaspongus
  - †Vinassaspongus erendili
  - †Vinassaspongus subsphaericus

== W ==
- †Weyla
  - †Weyla unca
- †Witchellia
  - †Witchellia sutneroides – type locality for species
- †Wollemanniceras
  - †Wollemanniceras alaskanum
  - †Wollemanniceras fohlinense
- †Worthenia
  - †Worthenia klamathensis
  - †Worthenia spp.
- †Wyomingites
  - †Wyomingites aplanatus

== X ==
- †Xenoceltites
  - †Xenoceltites cordilleranus
- †Xenocephalites
  - †Xenocephalites hartsocki – type locality for species
  - †Xenocephalites vicarius – type locality for species
- †Xenoxylon
  - †Xenoxylon latiporosum

== Y ==
- †Yezoites
  - †Yezoites puerculus
  - †Yezoites teshionesis

== Z ==
- †Zetoceras
  - †Zetoceras zetes – or unidentified comparable form
- †Zugmayerella
  - †Zugmayerella americana
  - †Zugmayerella koessensis
  - †Zugmayerella ormana
  - †Zugmayerella uncinata
- †Zygopleura
