= Unipeltoceras =

Unipeltoceras Temporal range: M Jura (U Callov)

Scientific classification
- Kingdom: Animalia
- Phylum: Mollusca
- Class: Cephalopoda
- Subclass: †Ammonoidea
- Order: †Ammonitida
- Family: †Aspidoceratidae
- Subfamily: †Peltoceratinae
- Genus: †Unipeltoceras; Jeannet, 1951

Extinct genus of ammonites

Unipeltoceras is an extinct ammonite genus included in the perisphictacian family, Aspidoceratidae, and a member of the subfamily Peltoceratinae, that lived during the Callovian stage, late in the Middle Jurassic.

Unipeltoceras is characterized by its strongly evolute, discoidal shell with sharp ribbing on the inner whorls and differing from Peltoceras, s.s. by having only an outer row of tubercles on the outer whorls.
