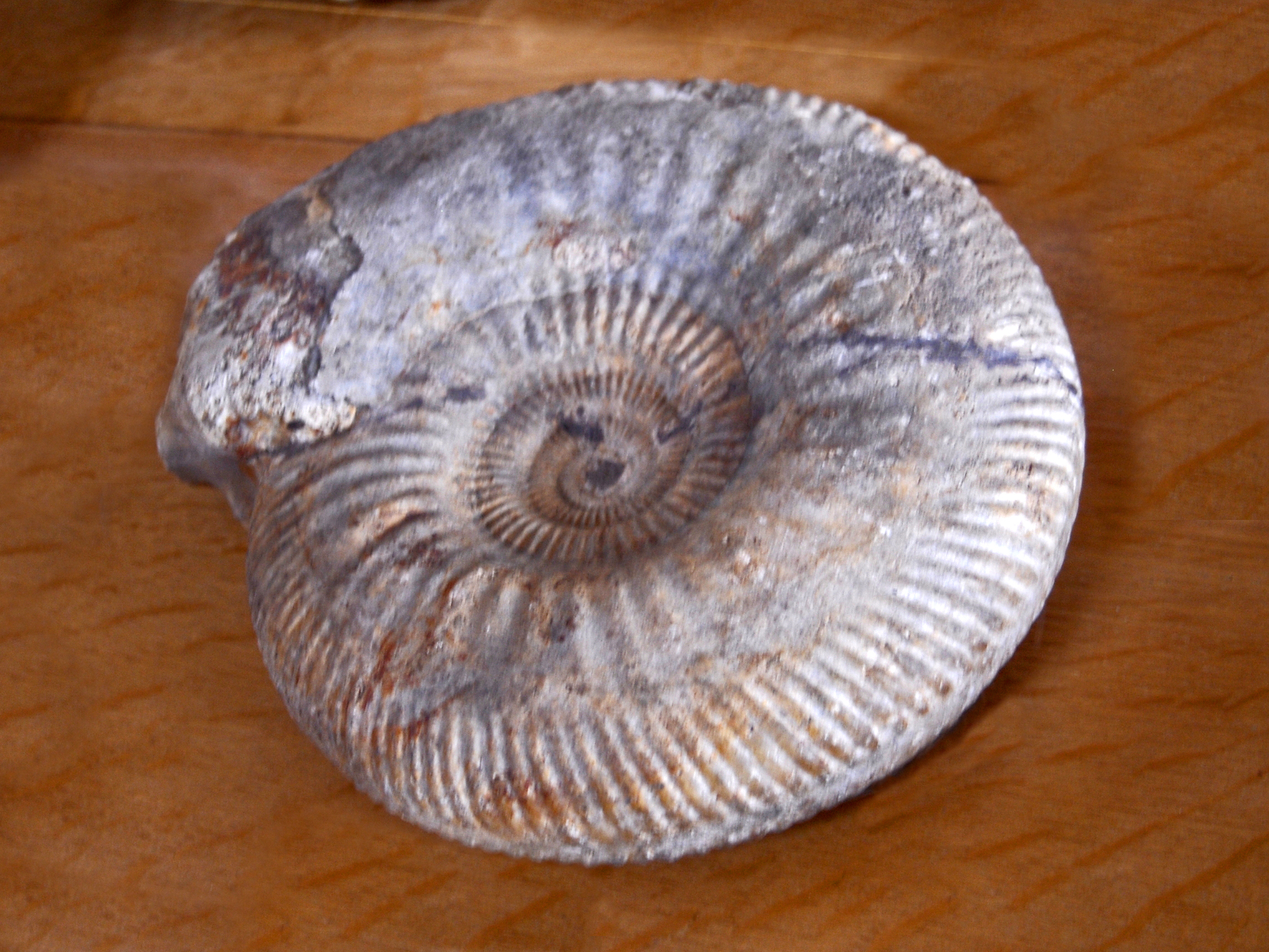
- Fossil of Durotrigensia species from France, on display at Galerie de paléontologie et d'anatomie comparée in Paris

Scientific classification
- Kingdom: Animalia
- Phylum: Mollusca
- Class: Cephalopoda
- Subclass: †Ammonoidea
- Order: †Ammonitida
- Family: †Parkinsoniidae
- Genus: †Durotrigensia; Buckman, 1928

Species
- see text

= Durotrigensia =

Durotrigensia Temporal range: Bajocian

Extinct genus of ammonites

Durotrigensia is a genus of ammonites (Ammonitida) in the perisphinctoid family Parkinsoniidae.

Durotrigensia is sometimes considered a subgenus of Parkinsonia and is related also to Oraniceras and Okribites.

These cephalopods lived during the Bajocian stage of the Middle Jurassic some 170 to 164 million years ago.

== Description ==
These large to giant ammonites have sharp and finely ribbed inner whorls and smooth outer whorls, without tubercles or lappets.
