= Chari Formation =

Geologic formation in India

- Stratigraphic range: Callovian-Oxfordian; ~165–158 Ma
- Type: Geological formation
- Sub-units: Dhosa Conglomerate, Dhosa Oolite & Dhosa Sandstone Members

Lithology
- Primary: Limestone, siltstone, sandstone
- Other: Oolite

Location
- Coordinates: 23.5°N 69.4°E
- Approximate paleocoordinates: 23.6°S 32.6°E
- Region: Gujarat
- Country: India

Type section
- Named for: Chari, "salt affected"
- Chari Formation (India) Chari Formation (Gujarat)

The Chari Formation is a Jurassic (Callovian to Oxfordian) geologic formation in Gujarat, western India. Dinosaur remains are among the fossils that have been recovered from the formation, although none have yet been referred to a specific genus. The ammonite Reineckeia has also been found here. The skulls of two marine crocodiles have also been found and have been putatively identified as Steneosaurus.

== Fossil content ==
Color key: Taxon / Reclassified taxon / Taxon falsely reported as present / Dubious taxon or junior synonym / Ichnotaxon / Ootaxon / Morphotaxon	Notes; Uncertain or tentative taxa are in small text; ~~crossed out~~ taxa are discredited.

=== Dinosaurs ===
Sauropods of the Chari Formation
Genus	Species	Location	Stratigraphic position	Material	Notes	Image
Sauropoda indet.	Indeterminate	Jumara		JUM/V/1, proximal part of left tibia.	An indeterminate sauropod	

=== Thalattosuchians ===
Thalattosuchians of the Chari Formation
Genus	Species	Location	Stratigraphic position	Material	Notes	Image
Steneosaurus?	S.? sp.	Dhosa Oolith		Two skulls, one of those skull is said to be 1602 mm in overall length.	A large teleosaurid thalattosuchian	

=== Mollusks ===
==== Ammonites ====
Ammonites of the Chari Formation
Genus	Species	Location	Stratigraphic position	Material	Notes	Image
Choffatia	C. pardagatus	Jumara			A perisphincitid ammonite	
Choffatia	C. cobra	Jumara			A perisphincitid ammonite	
Indosphinctes	I. indica	Jumara			A perisphincitid ammonite	
Phlycticeras	P. sp.	Jumara			A strigoceratid ammonite	
Reineckeia	R. anceps	Jumara			A reineckeiid ammonite	

=== Echinoderms ===
Echinoderms of the Chari Formation
Genus	Species	Location	Stratigraphic position	Material	Notes	Image
Alternacantha	A. schwermannorum	Jumara			A ophiacanthid brittle star	
Hanshessia	H. trochitophila	Jumara			A ophiacanthid brittle star	
Ishidacantha	I. fuersichi	Jumara			A ophiacanthid brittle star	
Lapidaster	L. etteri	Jumara			A ophiacanthid brittle star	
Ophiogaleus	O. dorecki	Jumara			A Ophiacanthid brittle star	

== See also ==
- List of dinosaur-bearing rock formations
  - List of stratigraphic units with indeterminate dinosaur fossils
