= Simoceratinae =

Simoceratinae Temporal range: Upper Jurassic

Scientific classification
- Kingdom: Animalia
- Phylum: Mollusca
- Class: Cephalopoda
- Subclass: †Ammonoidea
- Order: †Ammonitida
- Family: †Aspidoceratidae
- Subfamily: †Simoceratinae; Spath, 1924

Genera
- Aulasimoceras; Baeticoceras; Benacoceras; Hemisimoceras; Lytogyroceras; Pseudoclambites; Pseudosimoceras; Simoceras; Virgatosimoceras

Extinct subfamily of ammonites

The Simoceratinae is a subfamily in the Aspidoceratidae, a family of ammonites in the Perisphinctaceae, that lived during most of the Late Jurassic, especially in the Pacific and Tethyan realms. Early genera more closely resemble Perisphictidae and have constricted apertures. Later, more aberrant forms are unconstricted and develop grooved or concave venters.
