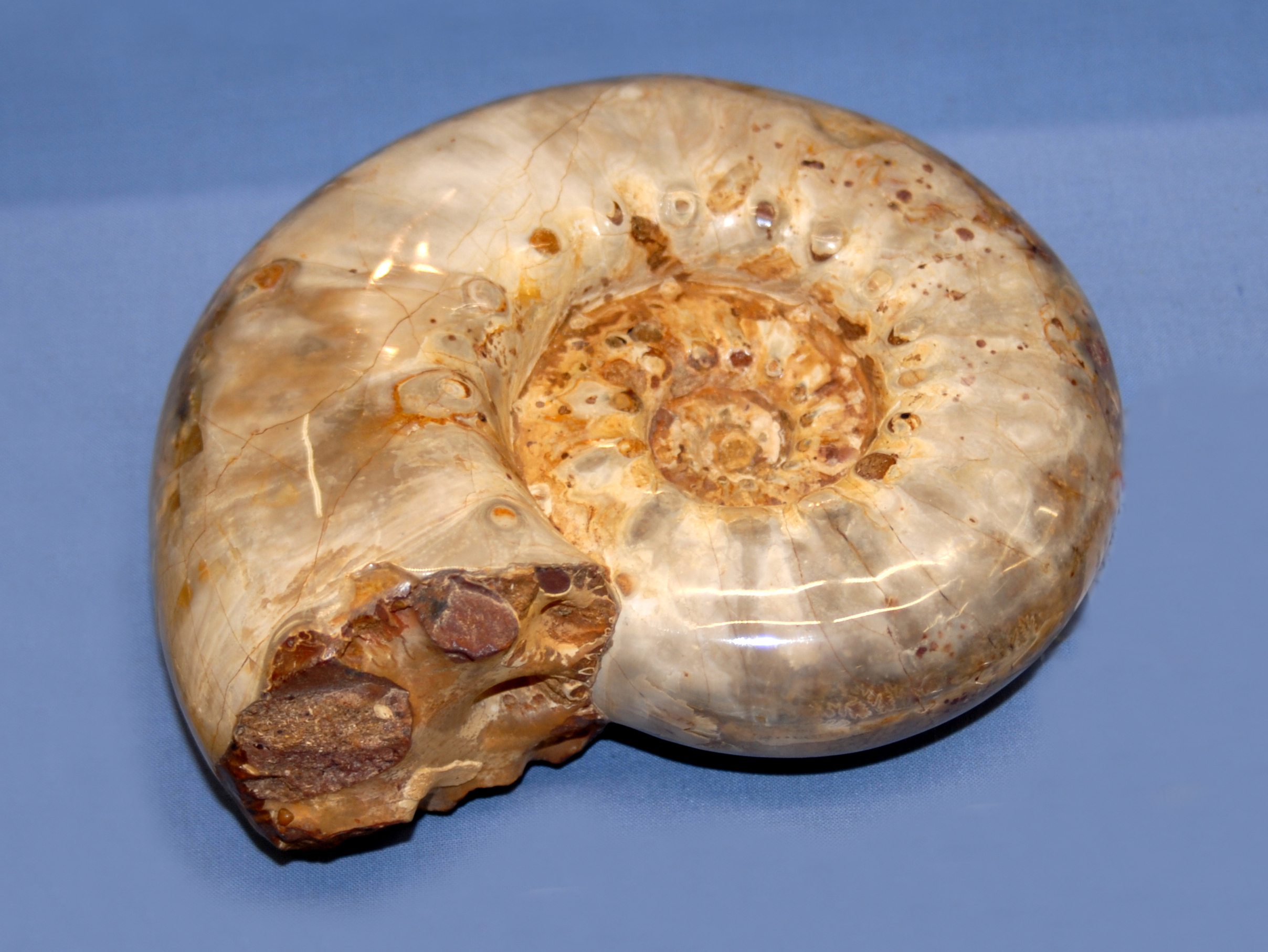
- Fossil shell of Aspidoceras acanthicum from Jurassic of Madagascar

Scientific classification
- Kingdom: Animalia
- Phylum: Mollusca
- Class: Cephalopoda
- Subclass: †Ammonoidea
- Order: †Ammonitida
- Family: †Aspidoceratidae
- Subfamily: †Aspidoceratinae
- Genus: †Aspidoceras; Zidttel, 1868

= Aspidoceras =

Aspidoceras Temporal range: Oxfordian–Berriasian

Genus of molluscs (fossil)

Aspidoceras is an extinct ammonoid cephalopod genus belonging to the family Aspidoceratidae.

== Taxonomy ==
Aspidoceras, named by Zittel, 1868, is the type genus for the persphictacian family Aspidoceratidae and subfamily Aspidoceratinae in which it is included. It is considered related to genera like Chinamecaceras, Cubaspidoceras, Euaspidoceras, Extranodites, Intranodites, Neaspidoceras, Oligopsychopsis, Orthaspidoceras, Schaireria and Simaspidoceras.

== Selected species ==
- † Aspidoceras argobbae Dacque 1905
- † Aspidoceras catalaunicum Loriol 1872
- † Aspidoceras somalicum Dacque 1905
- † Aspidoceras supraspinosum Dacque 1905

== Fossil record ==
Aspidoceras mainly lived during the Late Jurassic (Oxfordian) until Cretaceous (Berriasian), with a fairly broad distribution. Fossils have been found in Italy, Chile, Spain, Algeria, Antarctica, Argentina, Ethiopia, France, Germany, Hungary, India, Iran, Madagascar, Portugal, Romania, Russia, Somalia, Switzerland, the United Kingdom, United States and Canada.

== Description ==
Aspidoceras has an evolute shell with quadrate-rounded or depressed whorls that have two rows of tubercles, the outer near the middle of the whorl sides. The outer row soon fades in many species. Some species are also ribbed. The venter, or outer rim, is generally wide and broadly arched. Aspidoceras was predated by Euaspidoceras, possibly its ancestor.

== See also ==
- List of ammonite genera
