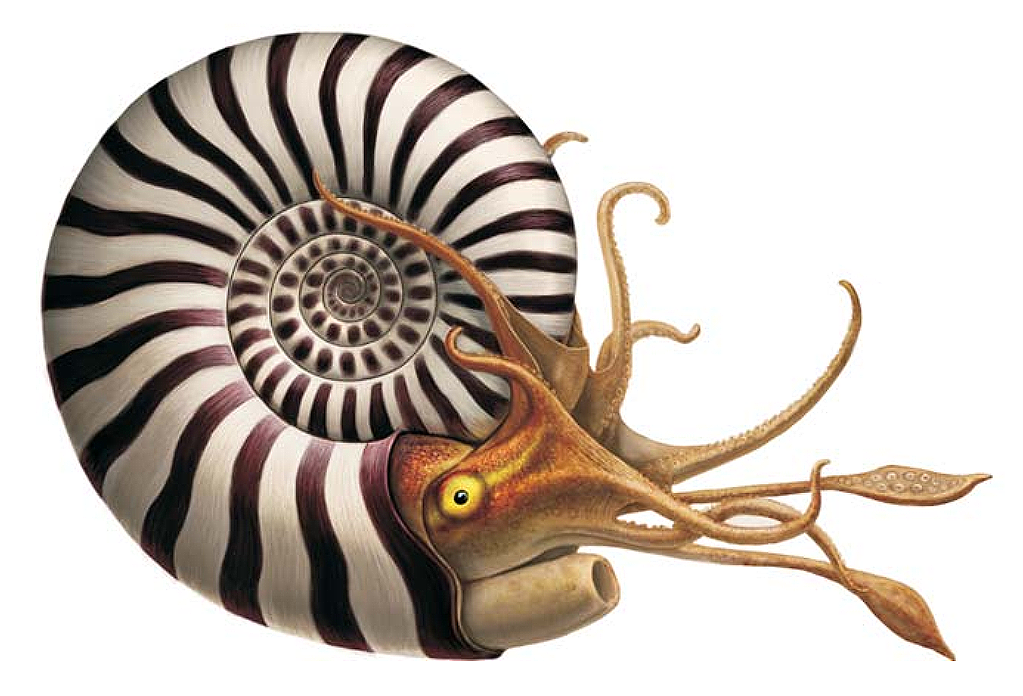
- Life reconstruction of Kachpurites fulgens by Andrey Atuchin based on (Mironenko, A.A., 2015).

Scientific classification
- Kingdom: Animalia
- Phylum: Mollusca
- Class: Cephalopoda
- Subclass: †Ammonoidea
- Order: †Ammonitida
- Superfamily: †Perisphinctoidea
- Family: †Craspeditidae
- Genus: †Kachpurites Spath, 1924

Type species
- Kachpurites fulgens Trautschold, 1861

Species
- Seven, see text

= Kachpurites =

Kachpurites Temporal range: Tithonian

Genus of ammonite

Kachpurites is a genus of perisphinctoid ammonite that lived during the uppermost Jurassic period (Tithonian). Kachpurites is a characteristic genus of the lower part of the upper Volgan substage in the Russian Platform.

== Description ==
The shell of Kachpurites is subinvolute with a rounded section and bears low, close spaced, moderately sinuous ribs.

The blood vessels in the siphuncle of Kachpurites consist of one large central vein with four arteries. This size and arrangement of the blood vessels is nearly identical to the blood vessels found in the siphuncles of other extinct genera such as the Permian prolecanitid Akmilleria or the extant Nautilus. This similarity of all three species show that the size and arrangement of their blood vessels is strongly conserved and it is likely that the last common ancestor of Ammonoidea and Nautilida also had similar structure.

=== Shell malformations ===
There have been malformed shells of Kachpurites fulgens discovered. They have small elongated pits that are arranged into groups on the surface of the shell and concentrated near the terminal aperture. Without changing in thickness they are bend downwards. These pits sometimes significantly alter the shape of the shell. Due to a lack of evidence, they are likely not from drilling, biting or healing of puncture wounds. Instead theses malformations were caused by epifauna that were located on the flexible uncalcified part of the periostracum in the apertural region of the growing ammonite shell.

== Taxonomy ==
It possibly belongs to the family Craspeditidae although some classify Craspeditidae as a subfamily within the family Polyptychitidae.

The genus currently contains seven described species. They are listed below:

- Kachpurites cheremkhensis Mitta et al., 1999
- Kachpurites evolutus Rogov et al., 2017
- Kachpurites fulgens Trautschold, 1861
- Kachpurites involutus Rogov, 2017
- Kachpurites laevis Kiselev & Rogov, 2021
- Kachpurites praefulgens Kiselev & Rogov, 2021
- Kachpurites tenuicostatus Rogov et al., 2017
