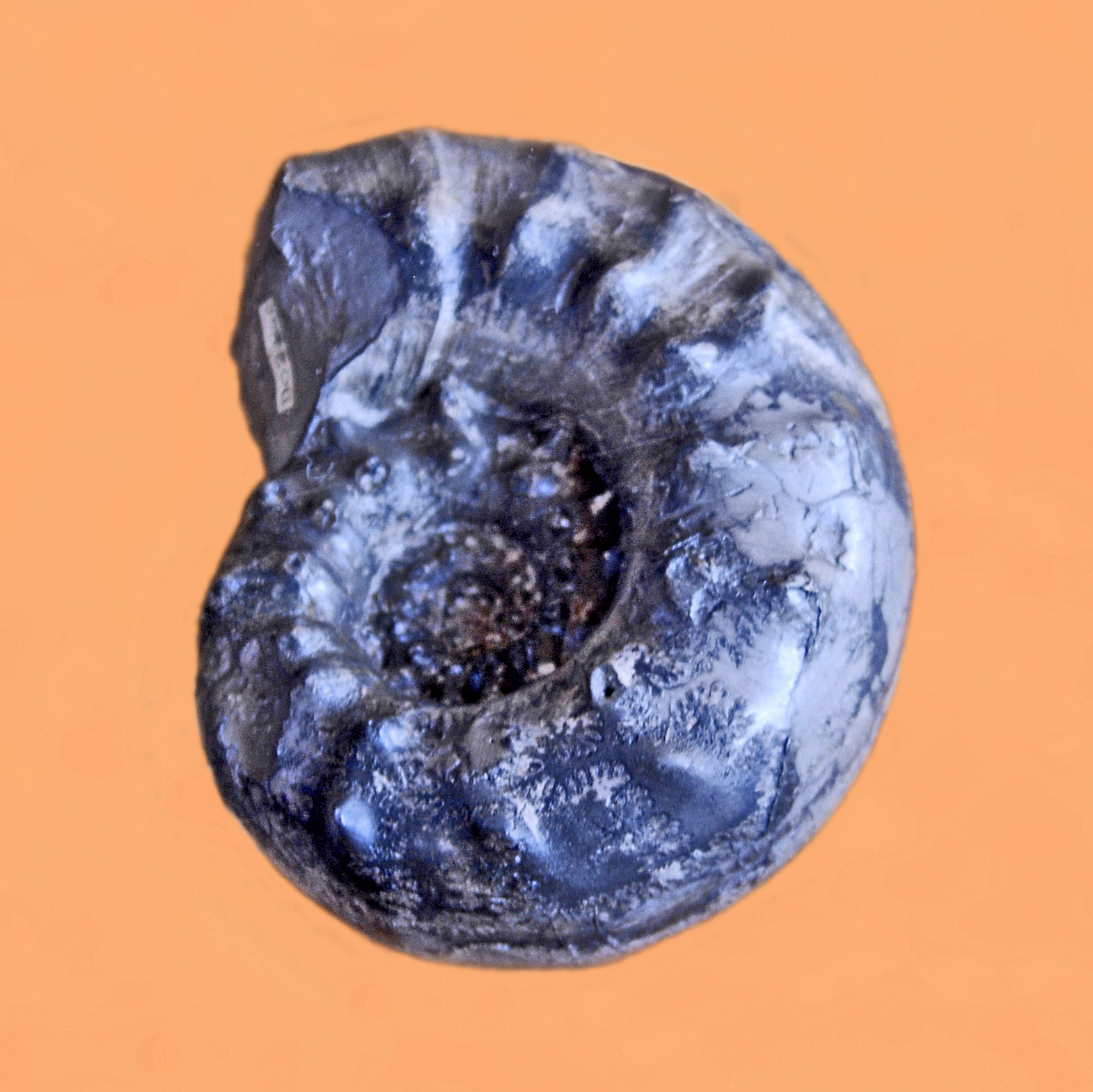
- Fossil of Euaspidoceras babeanum from Calvados, on display at Galerie de paléontologie et d'anatomie comparée in Paris

Scientific classification
- Kingdom: Animalia
- Phylum: Mollusca
- Class: Cephalopoda
- Subclass: †Ammonoidea
- Order: †Ammonitida
- Family: †Aspidoceratidae
- Genus: †Euaspidoceras
- Species: †E. babeanum

Binomial name
- †Euaspidoceras babeanum d’Orbigny, 1848

= Euaspidoceras babeanum =

Euaspidoceras babeanum Temporal range: Callovian–Oxfordian

Extinct species of mollusc

Euaspidoceras babeanum is an extinct ammonoid-cephalopod species that lived during the Jurassic period.

Fossils of Euaspidoceras babeanum may be found in the Upper Jurassic, Oxfordian stage of France, around 154 to 146 million years ago.

== Description ==
Euaspidoceras babeanum has a shell reaching up to 40 centimetres (16 in) of diameter.
