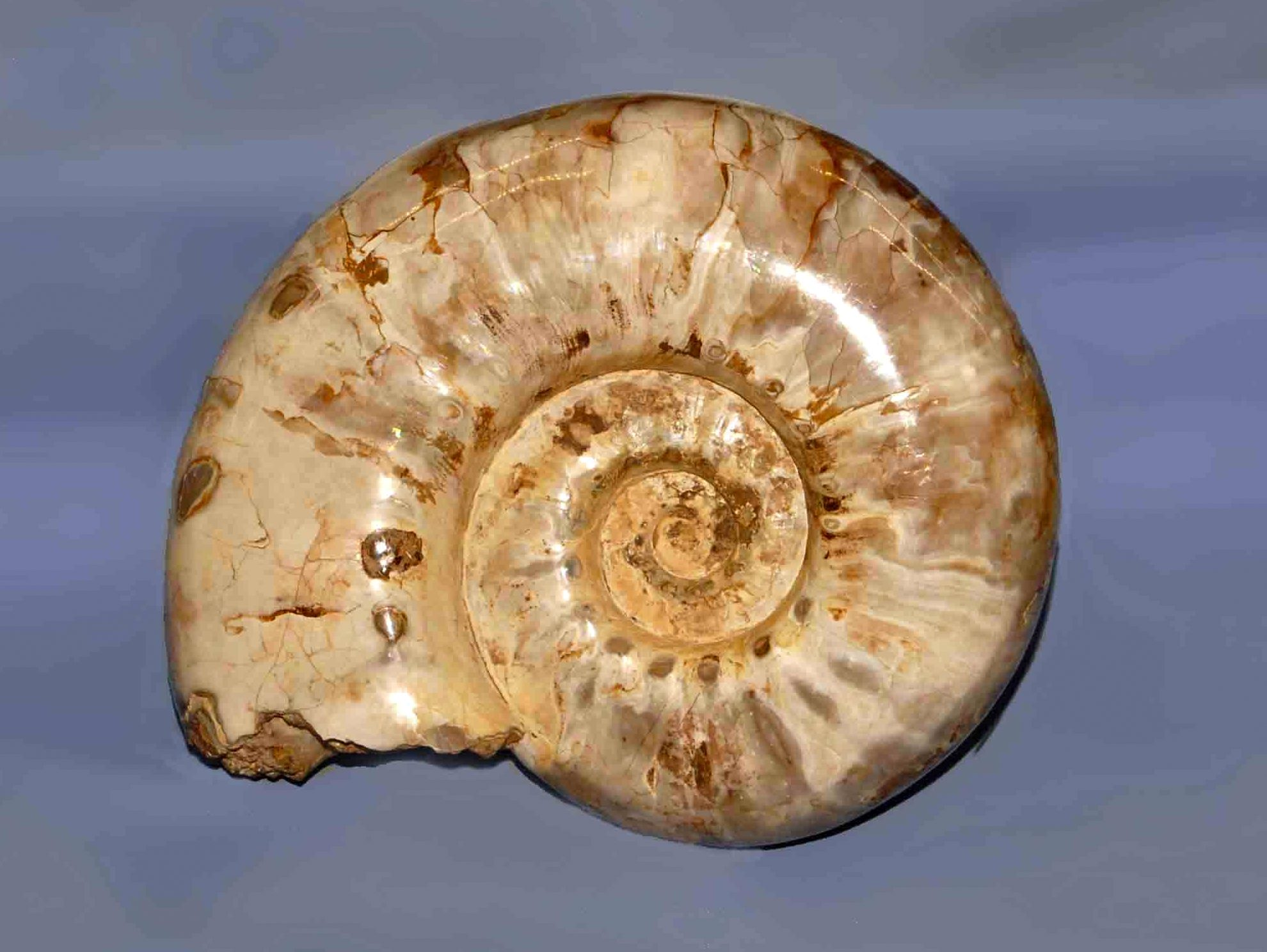
- Pseudowaagenia micropla from Madagascar

Scientific classification
- Kingdom: Animalia
- Phylum: Mollusca
- Class: Cephalopoda
- Subclass: †Ammonoidea
- Order: †Ammonitida
- Family: †Aspidoceratidae
- Genus: †Pseudowaagenia

= Pseudowaagenia =

Pseudowaagenia Temporal range: Jurassic, (Lower Kimmeridgian) 161.2–150.8 Ma

Genus of molluscs (fossil)

Pseudowaagenia is a genus of extinct ammonoid cephalopods in the family Aspidoceratidae.

== Distribution ==
Shells of this species have been found in the Jurassic of Italy and Madagascar.

== See also ==
- List of Ammonite Genera
