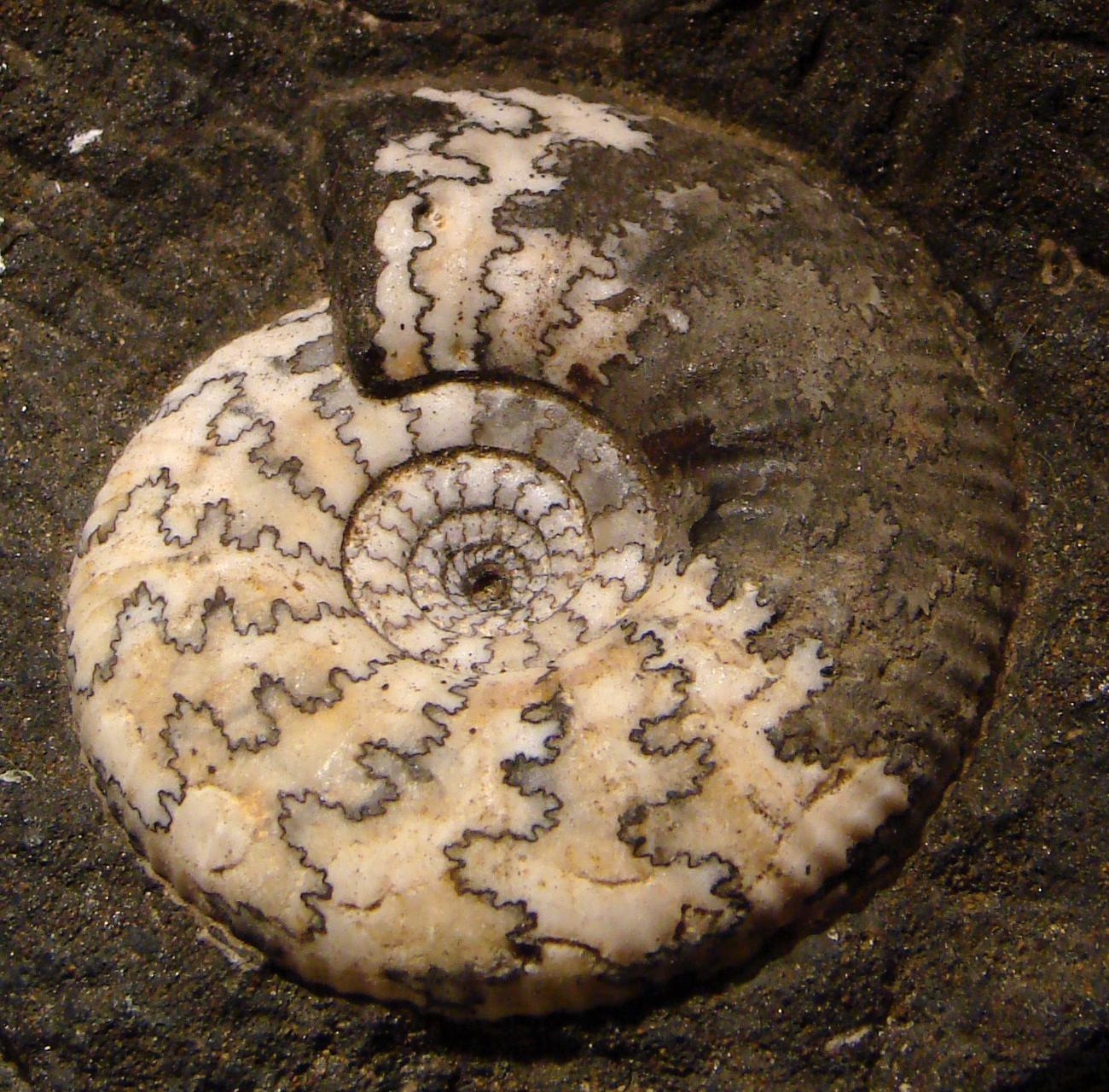

Scientific classification
- Kingdom: Animalia
- Phylum: Mollusca
- Class: Cephalopoda
- Subclass: †Ammonoidea
- Order: †Ammonitida
- Family: †Craspeditidae
- Genus: †Craspedites; Pavlow, 1892

= Craspedites =

Craspedites Temporal range: Tithonian–Berriasian

Genus of molluscs (fossil)

Craspedites is an ammonoid cephalopod included in the Perisphinctoidea that lived during the Late Jurassic and Early Cretaceous, found in Canada, Greenland, Poland, and the Russian Federation.

== Diagnosis and range ==
Craspedites, described by Aleksei Petrovich Pavlow in 1892, is characterized by a small, up to about 5 cm in diameter, smooth, essentially involute shell with simple ammonitic sutures. Whorl section is rounded, venter smooth; umbilicus small, exposing the dorsal portion of the inner whorls. Main sutural elements, primary saddles and lobes, are modified by small secondaries.

Craspedites was thought to be restricted to the Upper Jurassic Tithonian until discovery of a new species, C. sachsi, described from the Berriasian age of Russia by A. E. Igolnikov in 2012, named in honour of paleontologist V.N. Sachs.

== Species ==
- C. canadensis Jeletzky, 1966
- C. ivanovi Gerasimov, 1960
- C. jugensis Prigorovsky, 1906
- C. kaschpuricus
- C. mosquensis Gerasimov, 1960
- C. nodiger Eichwald, 1868
- C. planus
- C. praeokensis Rogov, 2017
- C. pseudofragilis Gerasimov, 1960
- C. sachsi Igolnikov, 2012
- C. shulginae Alifirov, 2009
- C. singularis
- C. taimyrensis
- C. transitionis Rogov, 2017
- C. unshensis
