= Umiaites =

Umiaites Temporal range: U Jurassic (Tith)

Scientific classification
- Kingdom: Animalia
- Phylum: Mollusca
- Class: Cephalopoda
- Subclass: †Ammonoidea
- Order: †Ammonitida
- Family: †Olcostephanidae
- Subfamily: †Spiticeratinae
- Genus: †Umiaites; Spath, 1931

Umiaites is a Late Jurassic (Tithonian stage) ammonitid included in the Olcostephanidae which is part of the Perisphinctoidea. The type is Umiaites rajnathi Spath, 1931.

The shell of Umiaites is large, reaching a diameter of 16 cm or greater, and evolute with a wide shallow umbilicus. Flanks are flat to gently curving. Whorls overlap the previous by a fourth.

So far, Umiaites is known only from Kutch in western India and is considered endemic to the region. Related genera include Spiticeras and Proniceras, with different distribution.
