= Aulasimoceras =

Aulasimoceras Temporal range: Tithonian

Scientific classification
- Kingdom: Animalia
- Phylum: Mollusca
- Class: Cephalopoda
- Subclass: †Ammonoidea
- Order: †Ammonitida
- Family: †Aspidoceratidae
- Subfamily: †Simoceratinae
- Genus: †Aulasimoceras; Spath, 1931

Extinct genus of ammonite

Aulasimoceras is an extinct genus of ammonite belonging to the family Simoceratinae.
