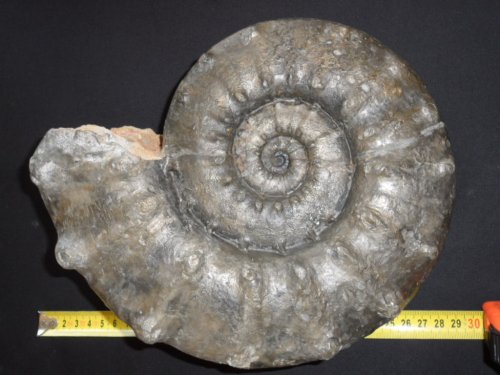
- Euaspidoceras, Coll. Reiter
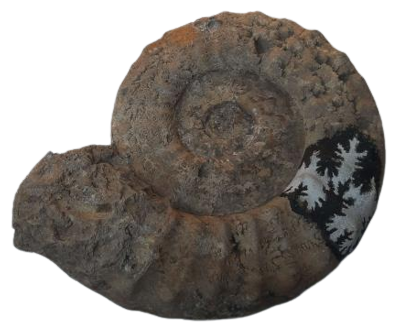
- Euaspidoceras akantheen, Coll. OUMNH

Scientific classification
- Kingdom: Animalia
- Phylum: Mollusca
- Class: Cephalopoda
- Subclass: †Ammonoidea
- Order: †Ammonitida
- Family: †Aspidoceratidae
- Subfamily: †Aspidoceratinae
- Genus: †Euaspidoceras; Oppel, 1863

= Euaspidoceras =

Euaspidoceras Temporal range: Callovian–Oxfordian

Genus of molluscs (fossil)

Euaspidoceras is an extinct ammonoid cephalopod genus that lived during the Middle Jurassic.

The ancestor of Euaspidoceras is probably Aspidoceras, and it is considered to be related to genera such as Orthaspidoceras, Simaspidoceras, and Intranodites.

== Species ==
- Euaspidoceras ajax Leanza 1947
- Euaspidoceras akantheen (or Aspidoceras akantheen) Buckman 1928
- Euaspidoceras davouxi Bert and Bonnot 2004
- Euaspidoceras babeanum d’Orbigny, 1848
- Euaspidoceras perarmatum J. Sowerby, 1822
- Euaspidoceras veranadaense Parent 2006

== Distribution ==
Euaspidoceras species may be found in the middle to late Jurassic of Argentina, France, Germany, India, Italy, Madagascar, Saudi Arabia, Spain, the United Kingdom and Yemen.
