= Reineckeites =

Reineckeites Temporal range: Callovian

Scientific classification
- Kingdom: Animalia
- Phylum: Mollusca
- Class: Cephalopoda
- Subclass: †Ammonoidea
- Order: †Ammonitida
- Family: †Reineckeiidae
- Genus: †Reineckeites

Species
- Reineckeites douvillei Steinmann 1881; Reineckeites helveticus Jeannet 1951; Reineckeites hungaricus Till 1910; Reineckeites paronai Petitclerc 1915; Reineckeites planus Lee 1915; Reineckeites stuebeli Steinmann 1881

Genus of molluscs (fossil)

Reineckeites is a Lower Jurassic ammonite belonging to the ammonitid.

== Distribution ==
Chile, China, Europe, Madagascar and Alaska
