= Bihenduloceras =

Bihenduloceras Temporal range: Tithonian

Scientific classification
- Kingdom: Animalia
- Phylum: Mollusca
- Class: Cephalopoda
- Subclass: †Ammonoidea
- Order: †Ammonitida
- Family: †Olcostephanidae
- Genus: †Bihenduloceras; Spath, 1945

Species
- None cataloged

Bihenduloceras is an Upper Jurassic perisphinctacean ammonite and member of the olcostephanid subfamily Spiticeratine. Its shell has a subquadrate whorl section, flattended venter, and fine ribs that spring in bundles from large umbilical tubercles.
