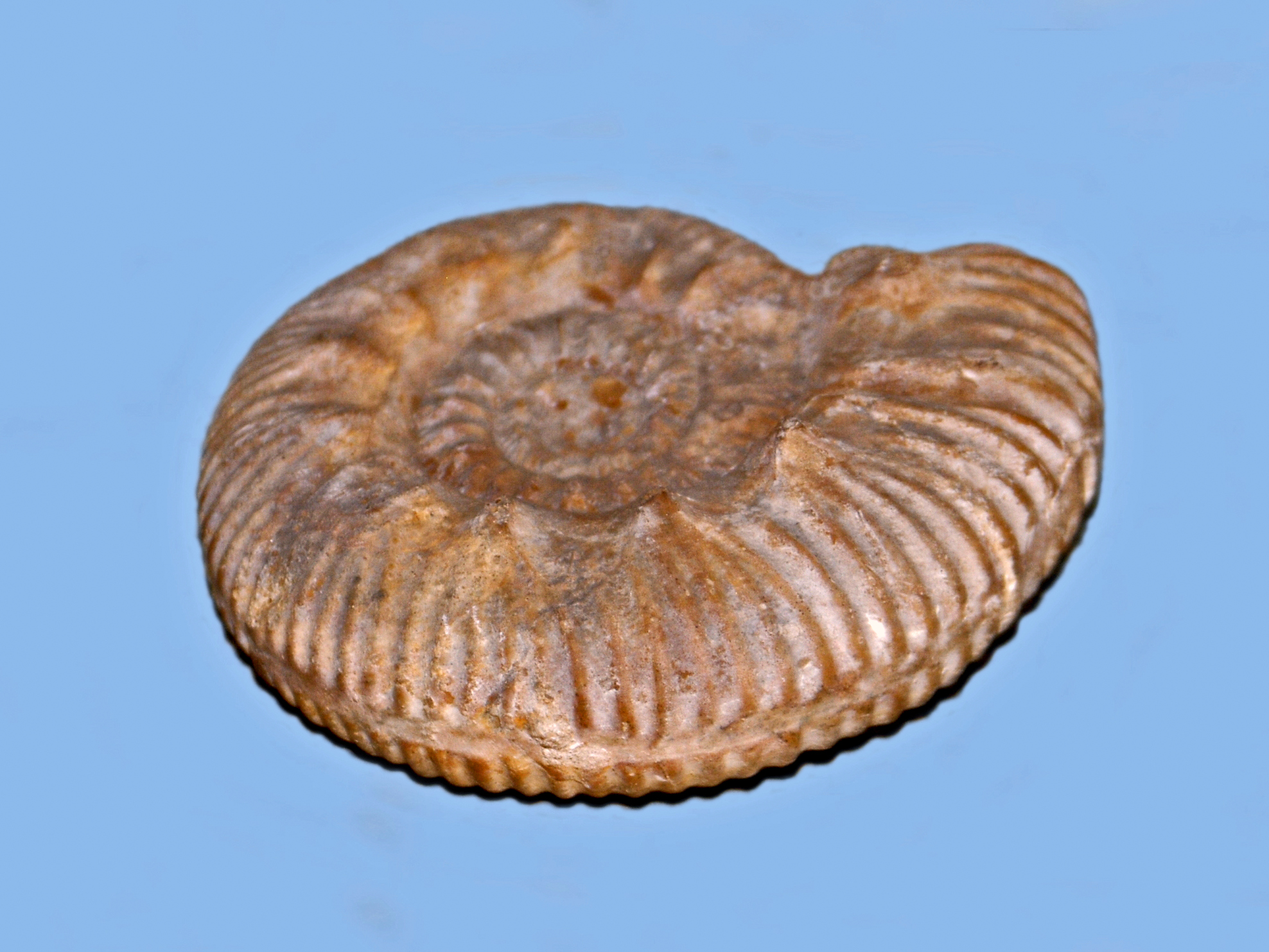
- Fossil shell of Reineckeia anceps from Poitou (France), on display at Galerie de paléontologie et d'anatomie comparée in Paris

Scientific classification
- Kingdom: Animalia
- Phylum: Mollusca
- Class: Cephalopoda
- Subclass: †Ammonoidea
- Order: †Ammonitida
- Family: †Reineckeiidae
- Genus: †Reineckeia; Bayle 1818

= Reineckeia =

Reineckeia Temporal range: Middle Jurassic, 164.7–145.5 Ma

Genus of molluscs (fossil)

Reineckeia is an extinct genus of ammonoid cephalopods belonging to the family Reineckeiidae.

These fast-moving nektonic carnivores lived during the Middle Jurassic period, from the Bathonian age to the Callovian age.

== Description ==
Shells of Reineckeia species can reach a diameter of about 38 centimetres (15 in).

== Distribution ==
Fossils of species within this genus have been found in the Middle Jurassic Calabozo and Los Molles Formations of Argentina, Chile, France, the Berching Formation of Germany, Portugal, Chari Formation of India, Madagascar, Switzerland and United States.
