= James Parkinson =

English surgeon (1755–1824)

James Parkinson FGS
- Born: 11 April 1755; Hoxton, London, England
- Died: 21 December 1824 (aged 69); Hoxton, London, England
- Resting place: St Leonard's Church, Shoreditch
- Education: The London Hospital
- Occupations: Surgeon; geologist; palaeontologist
- Known for: First description of Parkinson's disease
- Spouse: Mary Dale (m. 1783)
- Children: 8

James Parkinson (11 April 1755 – 21 December 1824) was an English surgeon, apothecary, geologist, palaeontologist, and political activist. He is best known for his 1817 work An Essay on the Shaking Palsy, in which he was the first to describe "paralysis agitans", a condition that was later renamed Parkinson's disease by Jean-Martin Charcot.

== Early life ==
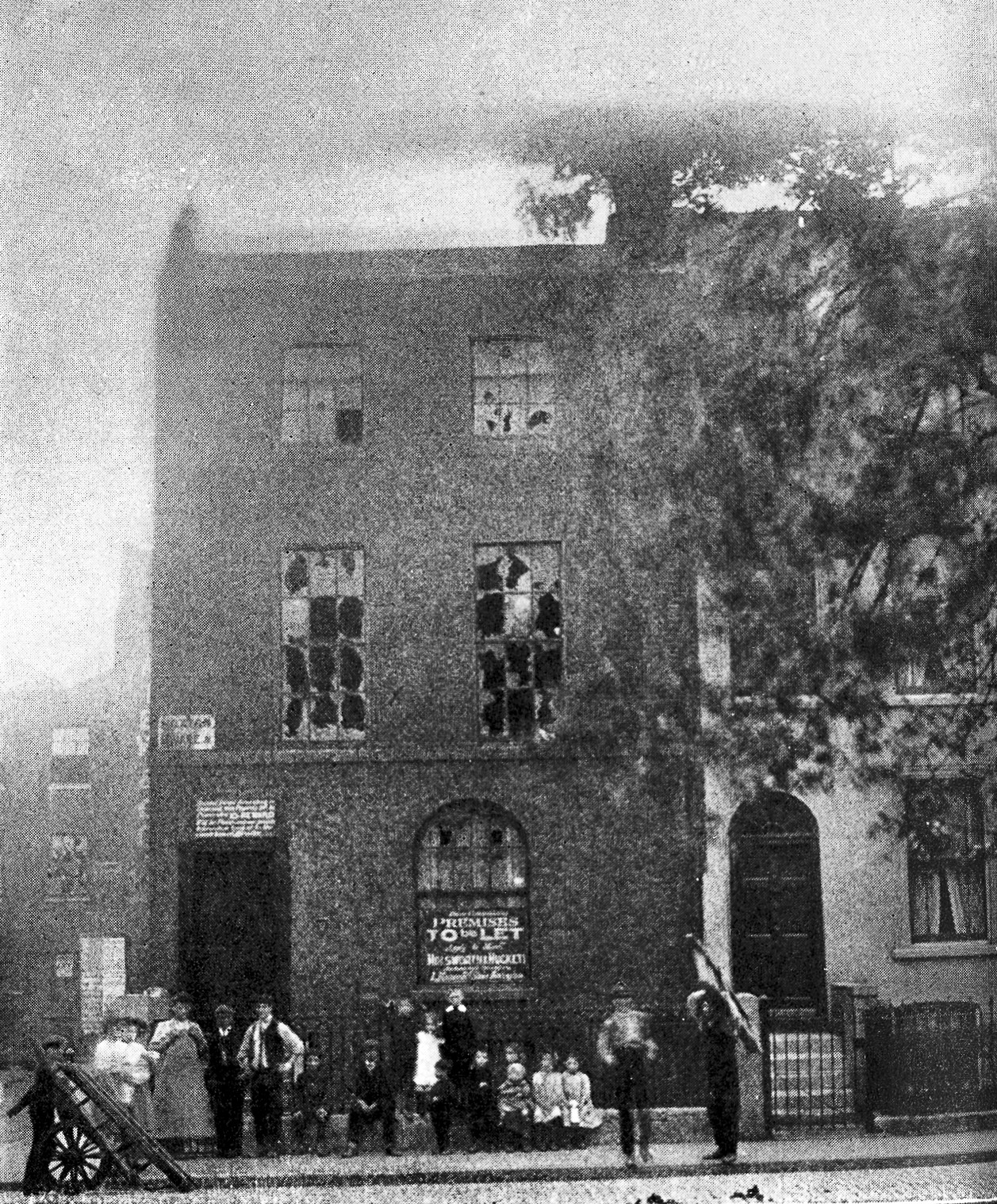
Parkinson's home and office at 1 Hoxton Square

James Parkinson was born on 11 April 1755 in Shoreditch, London, England. He was the son of John Parkinson, an apothecary and surgeon practising in Hoxton Square in London, and the oldest of five siblings, including his brother William and his sister Mary Sedgwick. In 1784, Parkinson was approved by the City of London Corporation as a surgeon.

On 21 May 1783, he married Mary Dale, with whom he subsequently had eight children; two did not survive past childhood. Soon after he was married, Parkinson succeeded his father in his practice in 1 Hoxton Square.

== Politics ==
In addition to his flourishing medical practice, Parkinson had an avid interest in geology and palaeontology, as well as the politics of the day.

Parkinson was a strong advocate for the underprivileged, and an outspoken critic of the Pitt government. His early career was marked by his being involved in a variety of social and revolutionary causes, and some historians think he most likely was a strong proponent for the French Revolution. He published nearly 20 political pamphlets in the post-French Revolution period, while Britain was in political chaos. Writing under his own name and his pseudonym "Old Hubert", he called for radical social reforms and universal suffrage.

Parkinson called for representation of the people in the House of Commons, the institution of annual parliaments. He was a member of several secret political societies, including the London Corresponding Society and the Society for Constitutional Information. In 1794, his membership in the organisation led to him being examined under oath before William Pitt and the Privy Council to give evidence about a trumped-up plot to assassinate King George III. He refused to testify regarding his part in the Popgun Plot until he was certain he would not be forced to incriminate himself. The plan was to use a poisoned dart fired from a pop-gun to bring the king's reign to a premature conclusion. No charges were ever brought against Parkinson, but several of his friends languished in prison for many months before being acquitted.

== Medicine ==
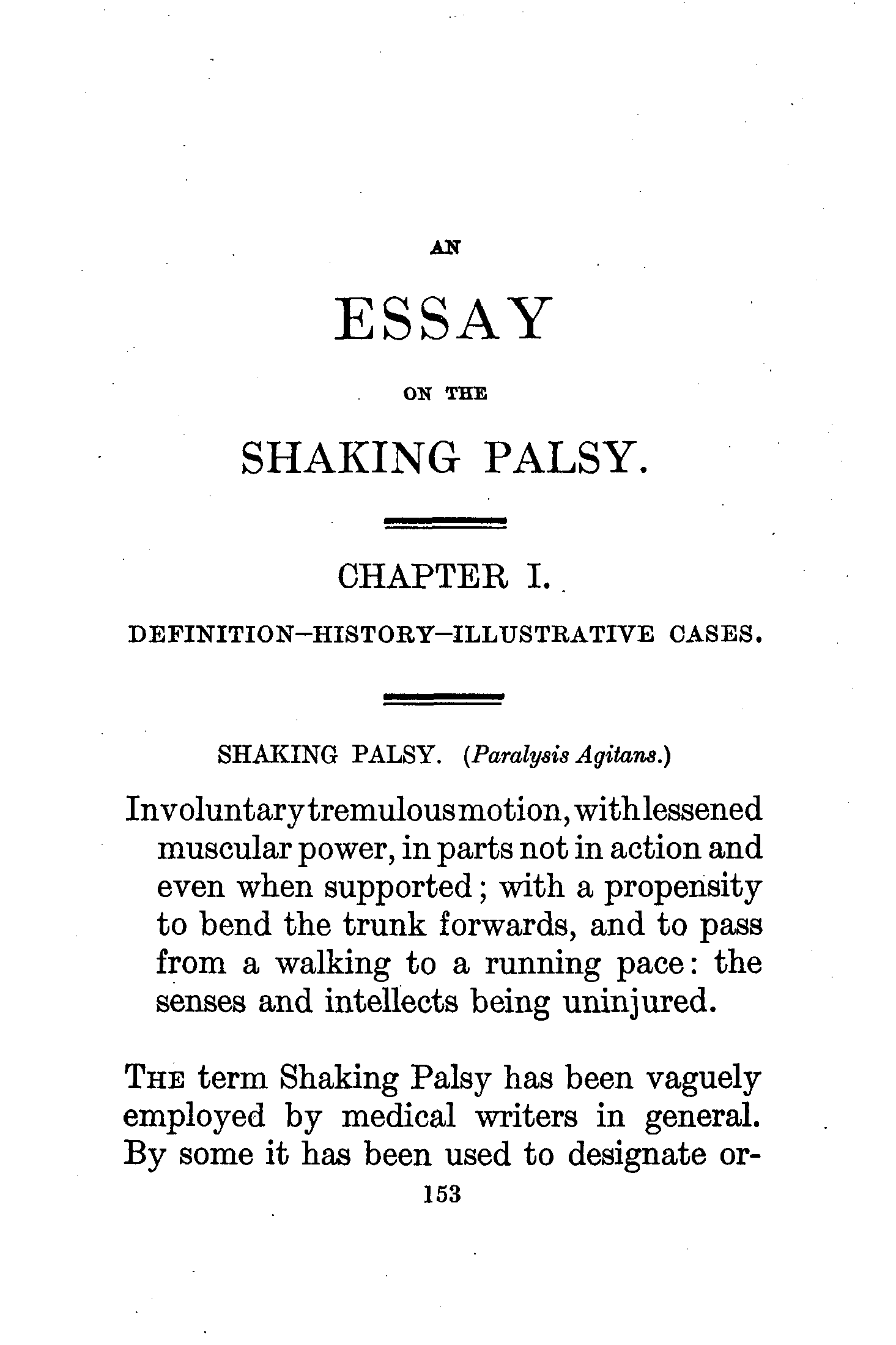
First page of Parkinson's classical essay on shaking palsy

Parkinson turned away from his tumultuous political career, and between 1799 and 1807, published several medical works, including a work on gout in 1805. He was also responsible for early writings on ruptured appendix.

Parkinson was interested in improving the general health and well-being of the population. His writings on public health revealed a concern for the welfare of the people similar to that expressed in his political activism. He was also a crusader for the legal protection for the mentally ill, as well as their doctors and families.

In 1812, Parkinson assisted his son with the first described case of appendicitis in English, and the first instance in which perforation was shown to be the cause of death.

He believed that any worthwhile surgeon should know shorthand, at which he was adept.

=== Parkinson's disease ===
Parkinson was the first person to systematically describe six individuals with symptoms of the disease that bears his name. In An Essay on the Shaking Palsy (1817), he reported on three of his own patients and three persons whom he saw in the street. He referred to the disease that later bore his name as paralysis agitans, or shaking palsy. He distinguished between resting tremors and the tremors with motion. Jean-Martin Charcot coined the term "Parkinson's disease" some 60 years later.

Parkinson erroneously suggested that the tremors in these patients were due to lesions in the cervical spinal cord.

== Science ==
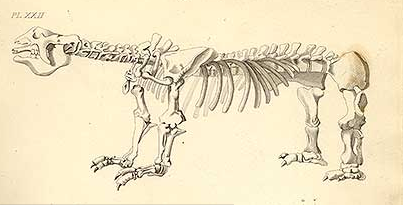
Megatherium fossil illustrated in Parkinson's Organic Remains of a Former World

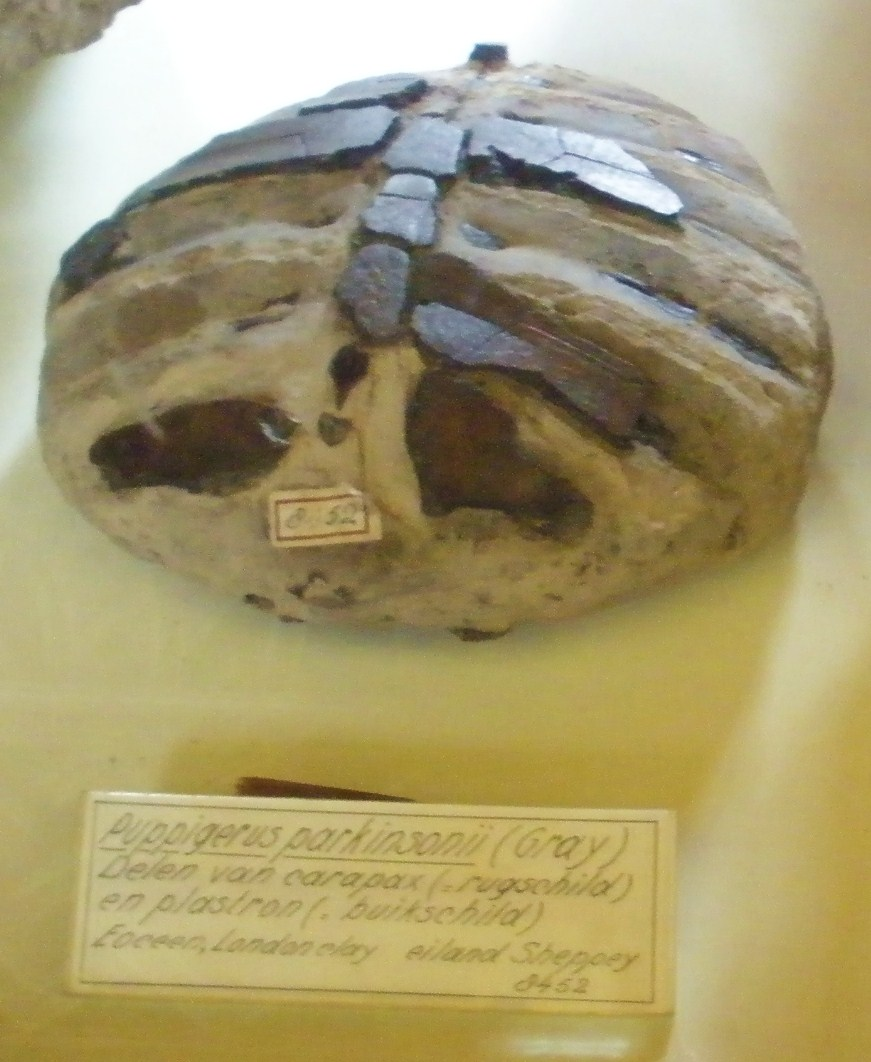
Fossilized turtle Puppigerus found in the London Clay on the Isle of Sheppey and named for Parkinson, collection Teylers Museum, Haarlem, Netherlands

Parkinson's interest gradually turned from medicine to nature, specifically the relatively new fields of geology and palaeontology. He began collecting specimens and drawings of fossils in the latter part of the 18th century. He took his children and friends on excursions to collect and observe fossil plants and animals. His attempts to learn more about fossil identification and interpretation were frustrated by a lack of available literature in English, so he decided to improve matters by writing his own introduction to the study of fossils.

In 1804, the first volume of his Organic Remains of a Former World was published. Gideon Mantell praised it as "the first attempt to give a familiar and scientific account of fossils". A second volume was published in 1808, and a third in 1811. Parkinson illustrated each volume and his daughter Emma coloured some of the plates. The plates were later reused by Gideon Mantell. In 1822, Parkinson published the shorter "Outlines of Oryctology: an Introduction to the Study of Fossil Organic Remains, especially of those found in British Strata".

Parkinson also contributed several papers to William Nicholson's "A Journal of Natural Philosophy, Chemistry, and the Arts", and in the first, second, and fifth volumes of the Geological Society's Transactions. He wrote a single volume Outlines of Oryctology in 1822, a more popular work. On 13 November 1807, Parkinson and other distinguished gentlemen met at the Freemasons' Tavern in London. The gathering included such great names as Sir Humphry Davy, Arthur Aikin, and George Bellas Greenough. This was to be the first meeting of the Geological Society of London.

Parkinson belonged to a school of thought, catastrophism, that concerned itself with the belief that the Earth's geology and biosphere were shaped by recent, large-scale cataclysms. He cited the Noachian deluge of Genesis as an example, and he firmly believed that creation and extinction were processes guided by the hand of God. His view on Creation was that each "day" was actually a much longer period, that lasted perhaps tens of thousands of years.

== Death and memorials ==
Parkinson died on 21 December 1824, after a stroke that interfered with his speech. He bequeathed his houses in Langthorne to his sons and wife, and his apothecary's shop to his son John. His collection of organic remains was given to his wife, and much of it was sold in 1827; a catalogue of the sale has never been found. He was buried at St. Leonard's Church, Shoreditch.

Parkinson's life is commemorated with a stone tablet inside the church of St Leonard's, Shoreditch, where he was a member of the congregation; the exact site of his grave is not known and his body may lie in the crypt or in the churchyard. A blue plaque at 1 Hoxton Square marks the site of his home. Several fossils were named after him.

There is no known portrait of him. A photograph sometimes identified as an image of him is either a dentist of the same name or James Cumine Parkinson (1832–87) who became a lighthouse keeper in Tasmania. Parkinson died before the invention of photography.

World Parkinson's Day is held each year on his birthday, 11 April. In addition to the eponymous disease, Parkinson is commemorated in the names of several fossil organisms, including the ammonite Parkinsonia parkinsoni, the crinoid Apiocrinus parkinsoni, the snail Rostellaria parkinsoni, and the tree Nipa parkinsoni.

== Works ==
- An Address, to the Hon. Edmund Burke from the Swinish Multitude London, 1793.
- Medical admonitions addressed to families, respecting the practice of domestic medicine, and the preservation of health London, 1799. Fifth Edition, 1812
- Hints for the improvement of trusses; intended to render their use less inconvenient, and to prevent the necessity of an understrap. With the description of a truss of easy construction and slight expence [sic], for the use of labouring poor. London: Symonds. 1802.
- The Town and Country Friend and Physician. Philadelphia, 1803.
- Organic remains of a former world. An examination of the mineralized remains of the vegetables and animals of the antediluvian world; generally termed extraneous fossils. London: Robson. 1804. The first volume containing the vegetable kingdom, 1804. Second Edition 1833. The second volume containing the fossil zoophytes, 1808. Second Edition 1833. The third volume containing the fossil starfish, echini, shells, insects, amphibia, mammals &c. 1811
- Parkinson, James (1805). Observations on the nature and cure of gout; on nodes of the joints; and on the influence of certain articles of diet, in gout, rheumatism, and gravel. London: Symonds.
- Dangerous sports. A tale addressed to children. London: Symonds. 1807.
- An Essay on the Shaking Palsy. London: Sherwood Neely and Jones. 1817.
- Outlines of oryctology. An introduction to the study of fossil organic remains; especially those found in the British strata: intended to aid the student in his inquiries respecting the nature of fossils, and their connection with the formation of the earth. London: Sherwood Neely and Jones. 1822. Second Edition, 1830
