= Aspidoceratinae =

Aspidoceratinae Temporal range:

Scientific classification
- Kingdom: Animalia
- Phylum: Mollusca
- Class: Cephalopoda
- Subclass: †Ammonoidea
- Order: †Ammonitida
- Family: †Aspidoceratidae
- Subfamily: †Aspidoceratinae; Zittel, 1895

Genera
- Arcaspidoceras Jeannet 1951; Aspidoceras Zittel; Chinamecaceras Cantu-Chapa 2006; Cubaspidoceras Myczynski 1976; Euaspidoceras; Extranodites Jeannet 1951; Intranodites Jeannet 1951; Neaspidoceras Spath 1931; Schaireria Checa 1985

Extinct subfamily of ammonites

The Aspidoceratinae is a subfamily in the perisphictacean ammonite family, Aspidoceratidae found world wide in middle and upper Jurassic sediments.

Aspidoceratinae differ from Peltoceratinae in that the early biplicate ribbed stage is lacking, or greatly reduced, and no forms with lappets are known. Aptycus are bivalved and very durable, and in the "lower Kimmeridgian form Aptychus beds, containing few or no ammonites". (Kimmeridgian is middle Upper Jurassic, follows the Oxfordian and predates the Tithonian).

The earliest Aspidoceratinae occur with the first Peltoceratinae, and likewise are probably derived from within the Perisphinctidae
