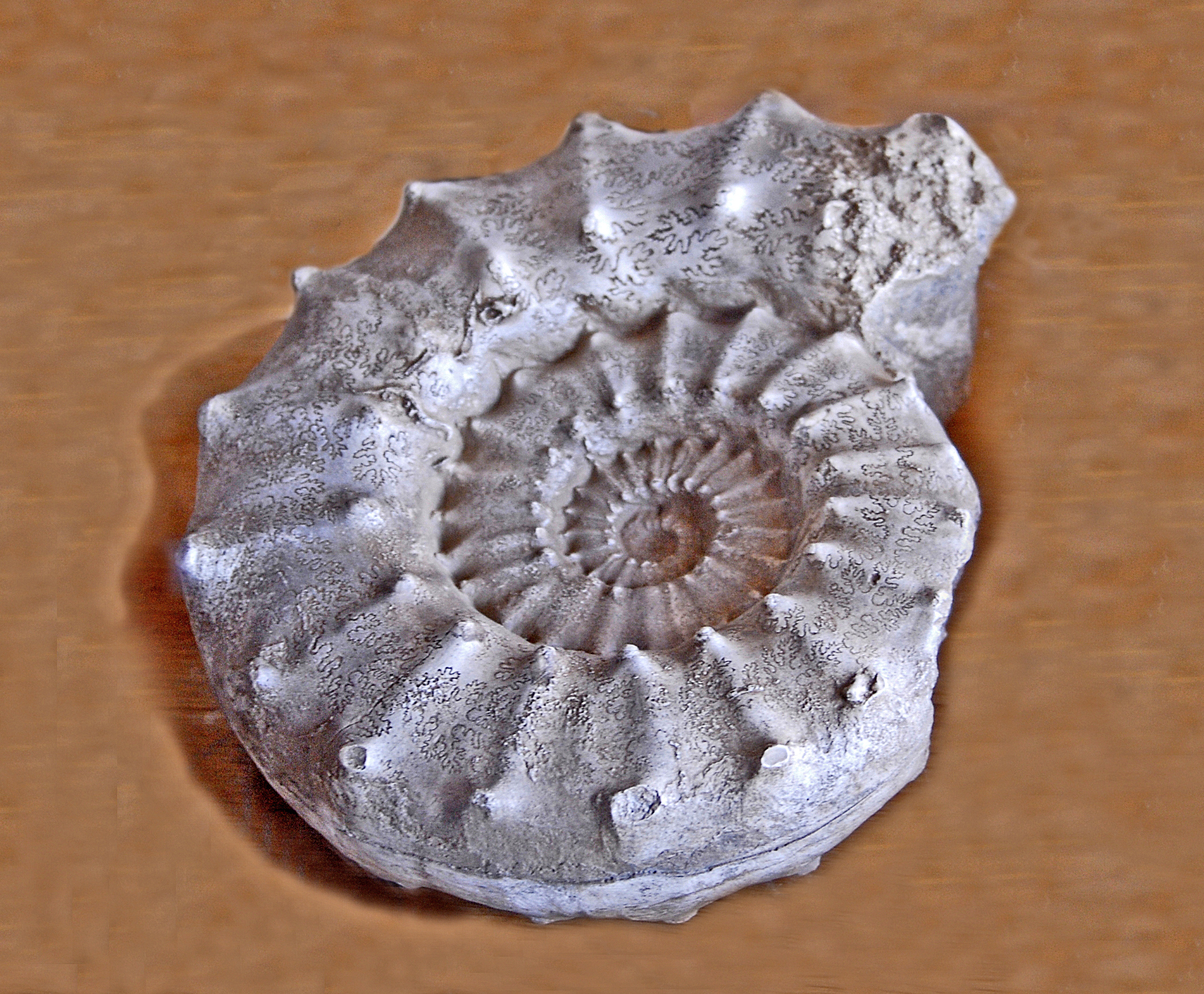
- Fossil of Euaspidoceras perarmatum from Calvados, on display at Galerie de paléontologie et d'anatomie comparée in Paris

Scientific classification
- Kingdom: Animalia
- Phylum: Mollusca
- Class: Cephalopoda
- Subclass: †Ammonoidea
- Order: †Ammonitida
- Family: †Aspidoceratidae
- Genus: †Euaspidoceras
- Species: †E. perarmatum

Binomial name
- †Euaspidoceras perarmatum J. Sowerby, 1822

= Euaspidoceras perarmatum =

Euaspidoceras perarmatum Temporal range: Callovian–Oxfordian

Extinct species of mollusc

Euaspidoceras perarmatum is an extinct ammonoid cephalopod species that lived during the Jurassic.

Fossils of Euaspidoceras perarmatum may be found in the upper Jurassic, Oxfordian stage of France, Germany, Russia and Saudi Arabia, around 154 to 146 million years ago.

== Description ==
Euaspidoceras perarmatum has a shell reaching up to 7.5 centimetres (3.0 in) of diameter.
