= Okribites =

Okribites Temporal range: Bajocian–Bathonian

Scientific classification
- Kingdom: Animalia
- Phylum: Mollusca
- Class: Cephalopoda
- Subclass: †Ammonoidea
- Order: †Ammonitida
- Family: †Parkinsoniidae
- Genus: †Okribites; Kakhadze, 1937

Species
- See text

Genus of molluscs (fossil)

Okribites is a perisphinctoidean ammonite from the middle Jurassic of the Republic of Georgia. It is assigned to the family Parkinsoniidae, a group of strongly but evenly ribbed evolute, commonly discoidal ammonites. Parkinsonia is a related genus.
