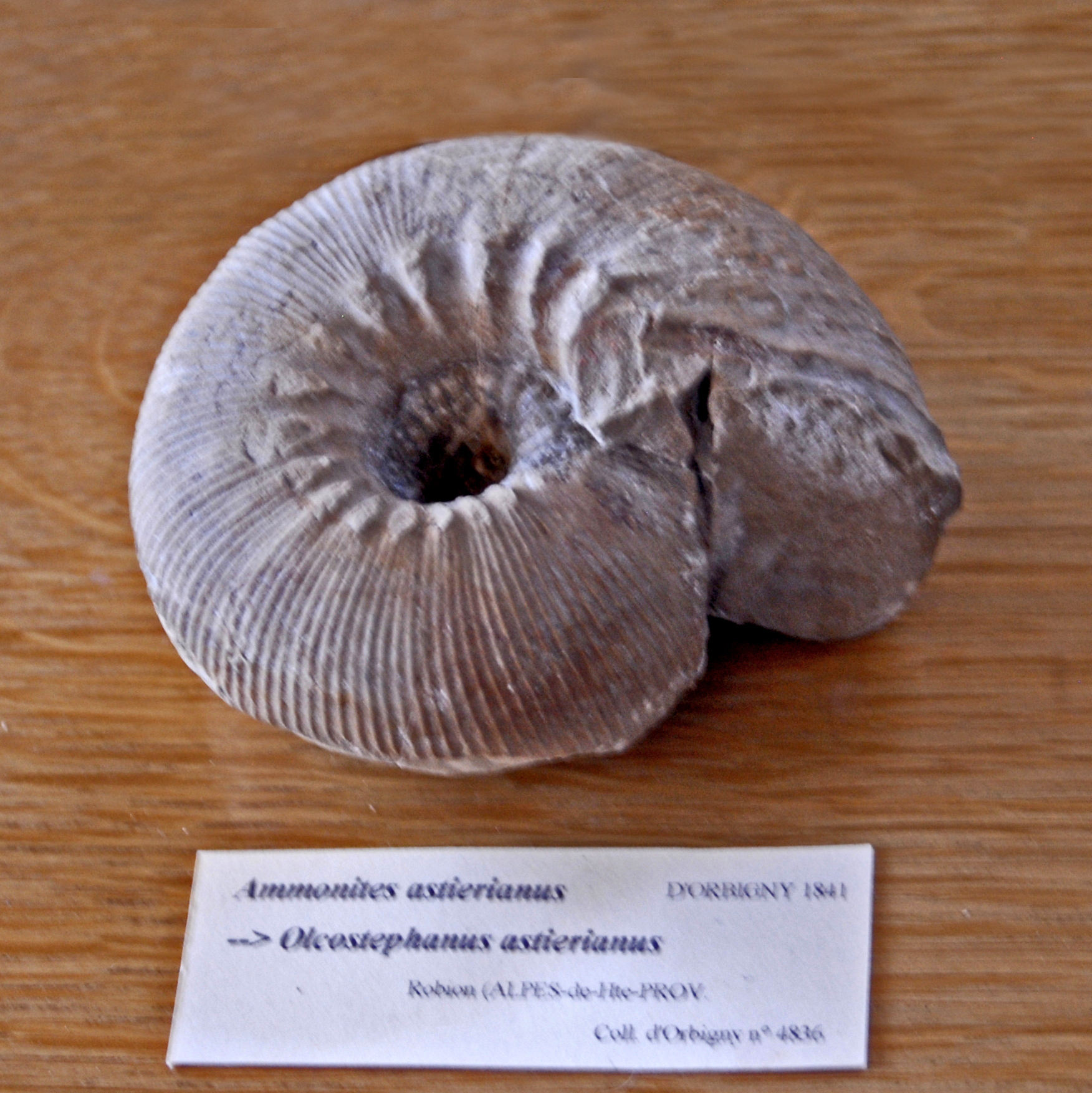
- Fossil of Olcostephanus astierianus from France, on display at Galerie de paléontologie et d'anatomie comparée in Paris

Scientific classification
- Kingdom: Animalia
- Phylum: Mollusca
- Class: Cephalopoda
- Subclass: †Ammonoidea
- Order: †Ammonitida
- Superfamily: †Perisphinctoidea
- Family: †Olcostephanidae; Haug, 1910

Subfamilies
- Olcostephaninae; Spiticeratinae

= Olcostephanidae =

Olcostephanidae Temporal range: from Jurassic to Cretaceous, 150.8–125.45 Ma

Extinct family of molluscs

Olcostephanidae is an extinct ammonoid cephalopod family belonging to the superfamily Perisphinctoidea. These fast-moving nektonic carnivores lived from the Jurassic to the Cretaceous period.

== Genera ==
- Aspidostephanus
- Baronnites
- Cantianiceras
- Capeloites
- Ceratotuberculus
- Garcites
- Groebericeras
- Holcostephanus
- Kilianiceras
- Mexicanoceras
- Negreliceras
- Olcostephanus
- Parastieria
- Proniceras
- Santafecites
- Saynoceras
- Simospiticeras
- Spiticeras (=Bihenduloceras)
- Umiaites
- Valanginites

== Distribution ==
Fossils of species within this genus have been found in the Cretaceous sediments of Antarctica, Argentina, Austria, Chile, Colombia, Czech Republic, Czechoslovakia, France, Hungary, Italy, Mexico, Morocco, Peru, Poland, Portugal, Romania, Slovakia, South Africa, Spain, Russia, United States, as well as in the Jurassic of Argentina and Mexico.
