= Baronnites =

Baronnites Temporal range: Valanginian

Scientific classification
- Kingdom: Animalia
- Phylum: Mollusca
- Class: Cephalopoda
- Subclass: †Ammonoidea
- Order: †Ammonitida
- Family: †Olcostephanidae
- Genus: †Baronnites; Bulot, Company & Thieuloy, 1990

Baronnites is an ammonoid cephalopod from the upper Valanginian stage of the Lower Cretaceous. Baronnites is represented by a single species, Baronnites hirsutus found in marine silty to sandy limestone and marl in Morocco, associated with another ammonoid, Busnardoites campylotoxus, brachiopods, bivalves, and other invertebrates.
