= Caumontisphinctes =

Caumontisphinctes Temporal range: Bajocian

Scientific classification
- Kingdom: Animalia
- Phylum: Mollusca
- Class: Cephalopoda
- Subclass: †Ammonoidea
- Order: †Ammonitida
- Family: †Parkinsoniidae
- Genus: †Caumontisphinctes; Buckman, 1920

Genus of molluscs (fossil)

Caumontisphinctes is an ammonoid genus from the ammonitid superfamily Parkinsonatoidea that lived during the Bajocian stage of the Middle Jurassic.

Chaumontisphinctis, named by Buckman, is like the genus Perisphinctis in being compressed with an ovoid whorl section but perkinsoniid in having sharp ribbing, a smooth or grooved venter, and tubercles commonly developed at bifurcation points on the ribs and at the ventral edge or on the venter.
