= Rursiceras =

Rursiceras Temporal range: Callovian

Scientific classification
- Kingdom: Animalia
- Phylum: Mollusca
- Class: Cephalopoda
- Subclass: †Ammonoidea
- Order: †Ammonitida
- Family: †Aspidoceratidae
- Subfamily: †Peltoceratinae
- Genus: †Rursiceras; Buckman, 1919

Species
- Rursiceras pseudotorosum Prieser 1937; Rursiceras reversum Leckenby 1859

Genus of molluscs (fossil)

Rursiceras is a Jurassic ammonite belonging to the ammonitid.

== Distribution ==
France and Switzerland
