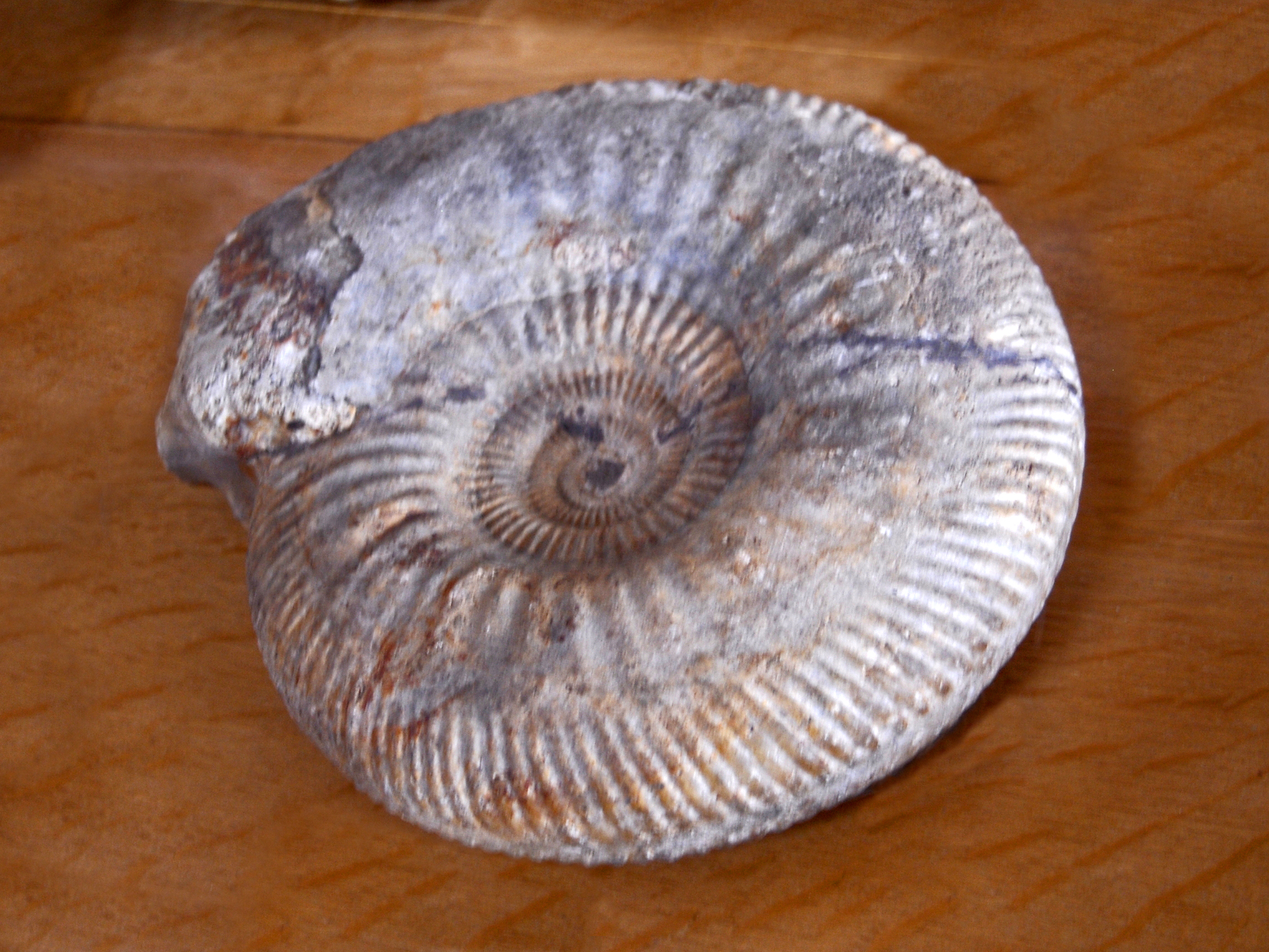
- Fossil of Durotrigensia species from France, on display at Galerie de paléontologie et d'anatomie comparée in Paris

Scientific classification
- Kingdom: Animalia
- Phylum: Mollusca
- Class: Cephalopoda
- Subclass: †Ammonoidea
- Order: †Ammonitida
- Superfamily: †Perisphinctoidea
- Family: †Parkinsoniidae; Buckman, 1920

Genera
- Caumontisphinctes; Epistrenoceras; Hemigarantia; Okribites; Oraniceras; Pseudocosmoceras; Strenoceras; Parapatoceratinae; Acuariceras; Parapatoceras; Parkinsoniinae; Parkinsonia

= Parkinsoniidae =

Parkinsoniidae Temporal range: Bajocian–Bathonian

Extinct family of ammonites

Parkinsoniidae is a family of ammonites belonging to the order Ammonitida. The cephalopod family lived from the Bajocian stage to the Bathonian age of the Middle Jurassic.
