= Epistrenoceras =

Epistrenoceras Temporal range: Bajocian–Bathonian

Scientific classification
- Kingdom: Animalia
- Phylum: Mollusca
- Class: Cephalopoda
- Subclass: †Ammonoidea
- Order: †Ammonitida
- Family: †Parkinsoniidae
- Genus: †Epistrenoceras; Bentz, 1928

Genus of molluscs (fossil)

Epistrenoceras is an extinct genus from a well-known class of fossil cephalopods, the ammonites. It lived during the Bajocian to the Bathonian.

== Distribution ==
Only found only at Winnberg quarry, Sengenthal, Bavaria, Germany.
