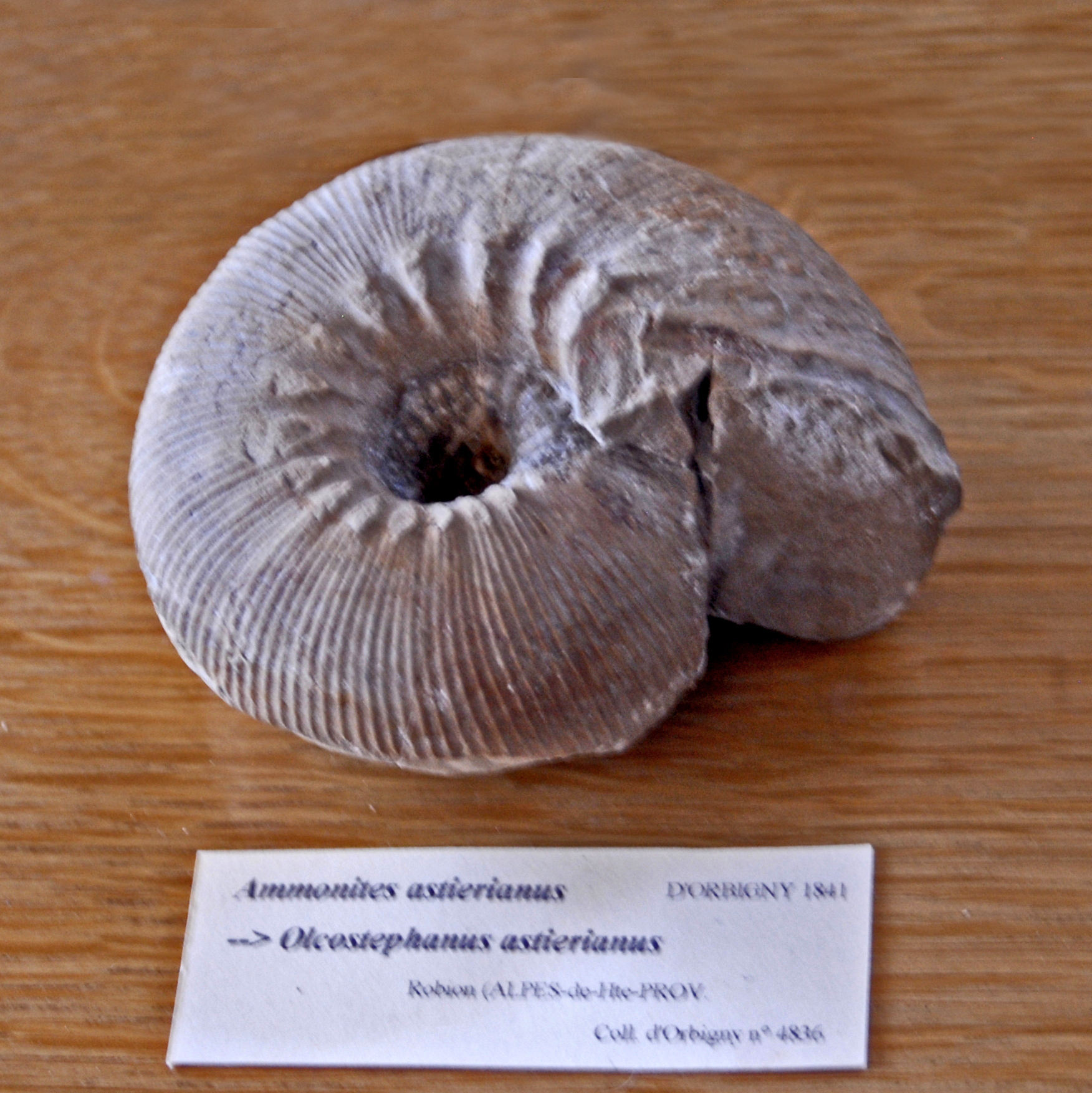
- Fossil of Olcostephanus astierianus from France, on display at Galerie de paléontologie et d'anatomie comparée in Paris

Scientific classification
- Kingdom: Animalia
- Phylum: Mollusca
- Class: Cephalopoda
- Subclass: †Ammonoidea
- Order: †Ammonitida
- Family: †Olcostephanidae
- Genus: †Olcostephanus; Neumayr, 1875

Synonyms
- Astieria Pavlow, 1892; Holcostephanus (Astieria) Pavlow, 1892; Lemurostephanus Thieuloy, 1977; Olcostephanus (Astieria) Pavlow, 1892; Rogersites Spath, 1924; Satoites Canta-Chapa, 1966

= Olcostephanus =

Olcostephanus Temporal range: Valanginian-Early Cretaceous ~139.8–130.0 Ma

Genus of molluscs (fossil)

Olcostephanus is an extinct ammonoid cephalopod genus belonging to the family Olcostephanidae. These fast-moving nektonic carnivores lived during the Cretaceous, from the upper Valanginian to the lower Hauterivian age.

== Species ==
- Olcostephanus astierianus (d'Orbigny, 1840)
- Olcostephanus atherstoni Sharpe, 1856
- Olcostephanus bakeri Imlay, 1937
- Olcostephanus bosei Riedel, 1938
- Olcostephanus delicatecostatus Haas, 1960
- Olcostephanus detonii Rodighiero 1919
- Olcostephanus filifer Imlay, 1937
- Olcostephanus laticosta Gerth, 1925
- Olcostephanus paucicostatus Imlay, 1937
- Olcostephanus pecki Imlay, 1960
- Olcostephanus popenoei Imlay, 1960
- Olcostephanus prorsiradiatus Imlay, 1937
- Olcostephanus quadriradiatus Imlay, 1938
- Olcostephanus sanlazarensis Imlay, 1937

== Distribution ==
Fossils of species within this genus have been found in the Cretaceous sediments of Antarctica, Argentina, Austria, Bulgaria, Chile, Colombia (Macanal Formation, Eastern Ranges), Czech Republic, France, Hungary, Italy, Mexico, Morocco, Poland, Portugal, Romania, Slovakia, South Africa, Spain, Russia, United States, as well as in the Jurassic of Argentina.
