= An Address, to the Hon. Edmund Burke from the Swinish Multitude =

1793 pamphlet by James Parkinson

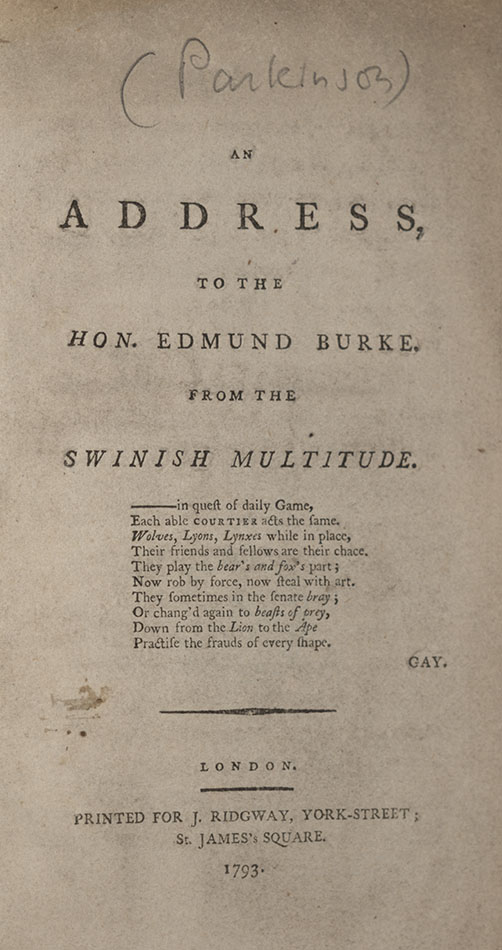
- Author: James Parkinson
- Language: English
- Genre: Politics
- Publication date: 1793
- Publication place: England
- Pages: 28 (first edition)

An Address, to the Hon. Edmund Burke. from the Swinish Multitude was a widely reviewed pamphlet by James Parkinson published in 1793 under his pseudonym "Old Hubert" in response and criticism to Edmund Burke's use of the phrase "swinish multitude" in his 1790 book Reflections on the Revolution in France.

E. P. Thompson quotes Parkinson's following passage from the pamphlet, in his The Making of the English Working Class:

"Whilst ye are… gorging yourselves at troughs filled with the daintiest wash; we, with our numerous train of porkers, are employed, from the rising to the setting sun, to obtain the means of subsistence, by… picking up a few acorns"
