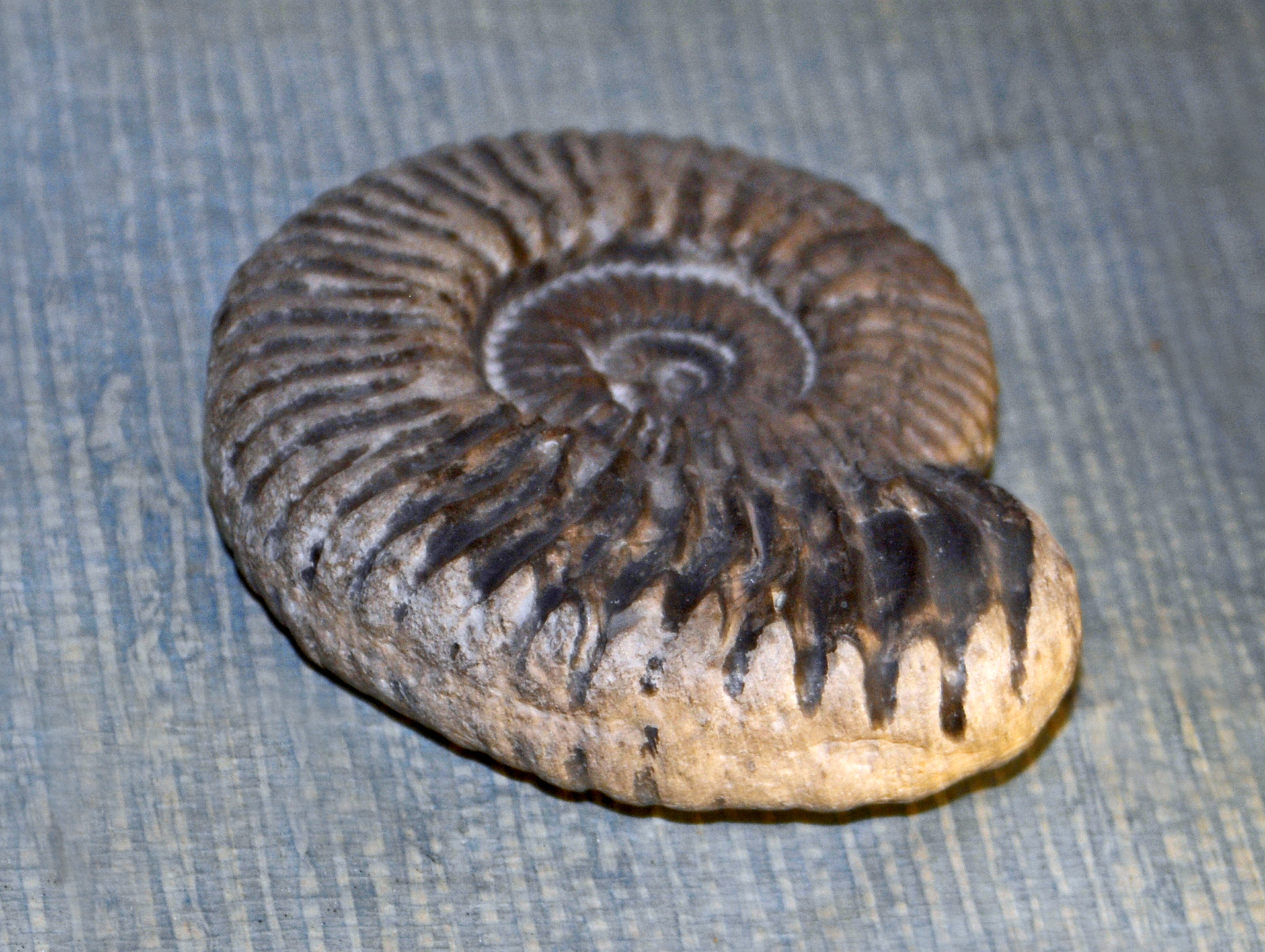
- Fossil shell of Peltoceras arduennense from Calvados (France), on display at Galerie de paléontologie et d'anatomie comparée in Paris

Scientific classification
- Kingdom: Animalia
- Phylum: Mollusca
- Class: Cephalopoda
- Subclass: †Ammonoidea
- Order: †Ammonitida
- Family: †Aspidoceratidae
- Subfamily: †Peltoceratinae; Spath, 1924

Genera
- Gregoryceras; Metapeltoceras; Parapeltoceras; Peltoceras; Peltoceratoides; Peltoraspailites; Prieserites; Pseudogregoryceras; Raspailites; Rursiceras; Unipeltoceras

= Peltoceratinae =

Peltoceratinae Temporal range: Middle Jurassic–Upper Jurassic

Subfamily of molluscs (fossil)

The Peltoceratinae comprise a subfamily in the Aspidoceratidae, (middle and upper Jurassic perisphinctacean ammonites).

Genera in the Peltoceratinae have sharply ribbed inner whorls and outer whorls that bear spines or tubercles, or have coarse simple ribs. Among these are giant forms with simple peristomes (aperture openings) that occur along with smaller forms with lappets.

Derivation of the Peltoceratinae seems most likely to be from the Pseudoperisphinctinae.
