= Acuariceras =

Acuariceras Temporal range: Callovian

Scientific classification
- Domain: Eukaryota
- Kingdom: Animalia
- Phylum: Mollusca
- Class: Cephalopoda
- Subclass: †Ammonoidea
- Order: †Ammonitida
- Family: †Parkinsoniidae
- Subfamily: †Parapatoceratinae
- Genus: †Acuariceras

Species
- Acuariceras acucostis Bert and Courville, 2016

Extinct genus of molluscs

Acuariceras is an extinct genus of cephalopod belonging to the Ammonite subclass.
