= Aspidostephanus =

Aspidostephanus Temporal range: Tithonian–Berriasian

Scientific classification
- Domain: Eukaryota
- Kingdom: Animalia
- Phylum: Mollusca
- Class: Cephalopoda
- Subclass: †Ammonoidea
- Order: †Ammonitida
- Family: †Olcostephanidae
- Genus: †Aspidostephanus; Spath, 1925

Species
- see text

Extinct genus of molluscs

Aspidostephanus is an extinct cephalopod genus belonging to the ammonite subclass, included in the perisphinctacean family Olcostephanidae that lived during the earliest Cretaceous and possible latest Jurassic. Fossils of the genus have been found in France, the Balearics, North Africa, and Argentina.

The shell of Aspidostephanus is depressed with a broad smooth venter. Early whorls have strong lateral ribs with umbilical and lateral tubercles; later whorls smooth except for tubercles at the umbilicus. Whorl height increases with age. Aspidostephanus is similar to but broader than its close relative, Spiticeras.
