= Benacoceras =

Benacoceras Temporal range: Kimmeridgian

Scientific classification
- Kingdom: Animalia
- Phylum: Mollusca
- Class: Cephalopoda
- Subclass: †Ammonoidea
- Order: †Ammonitida
- Family: †Aspidoceratidae
- Genus: †Benacoceras; Spath, 1925

Species
- None Cataloged

Benacoceras is a strongly ribbed, evolute ammonite from the Late Jurassic, coiled so that all whorls are exposed. Ribbing is biplicate, with very short secondaries. The venter, the outer rim, is smooth, at least on the outer whorl.
