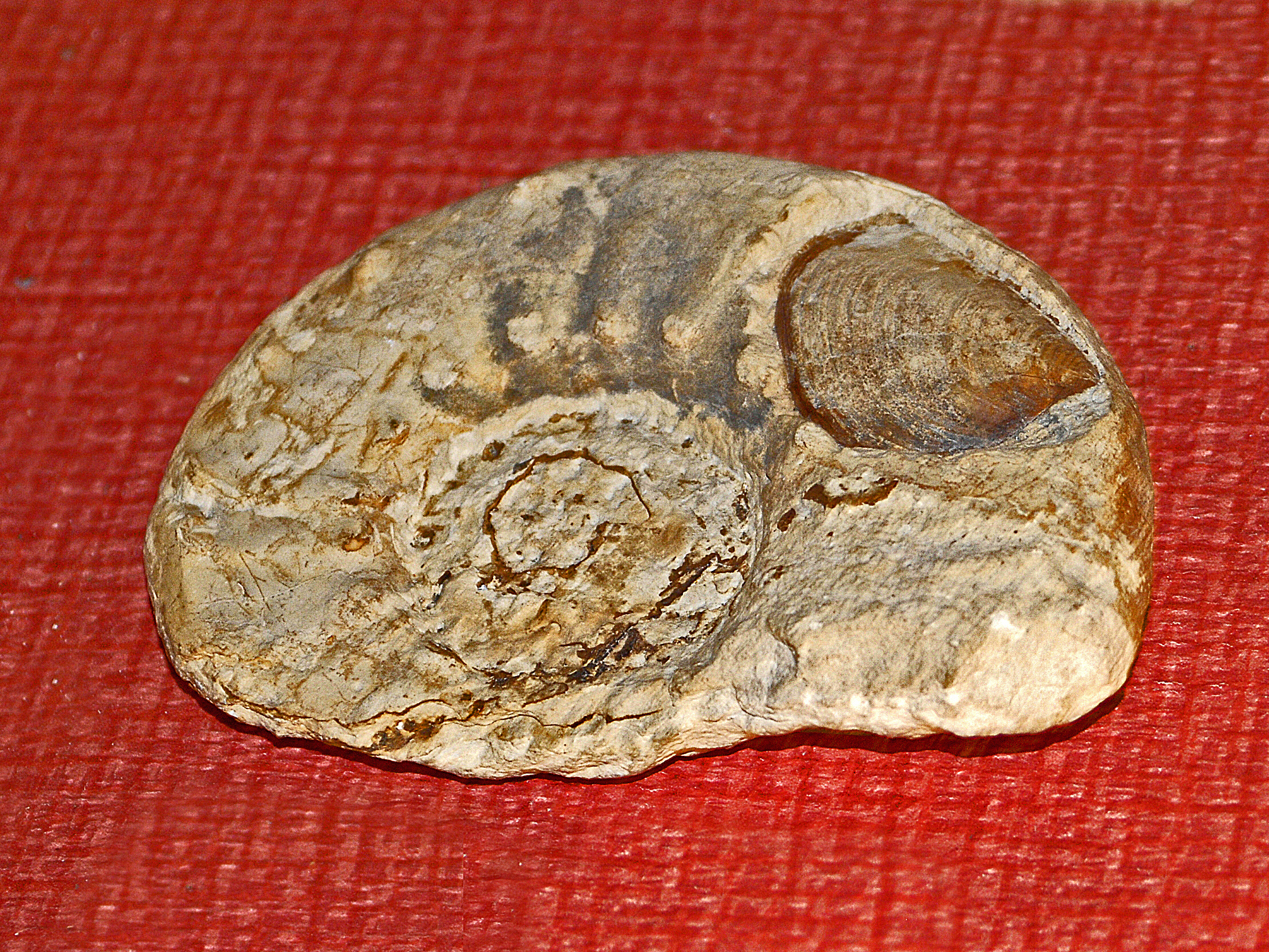
- Fossil shell of Epaspidoceras lusitanicum, from Charente-Maritime. Specimen showing the aptychus, on display at Galerie de paléontologie et d'anatomie comparée, Paris

Scientific classification
- Kingdom: Animalia
- Phylum: Mollusca
- Class: Cephalopoda
- Subclass: †Ammonoidea
- Order: †Ammonitida
- Family: †Aspidoceratidae
- Genus: †Epaspidoceras; Spath, 1931

Species
- None cataloged

= Epaspidoceras =

Epaspidoceras Temporal range: Kimmeridgian

Genus of molluscs (fossil)

Epaspidoceras is an extinct ammonoid cephalopod genus belonging to the order Ammonitida, family Aspidoceratidae. These cephalopods were fast-moving nektonic carnivores. They lived during the Jurassic (Kimmeridgian).
