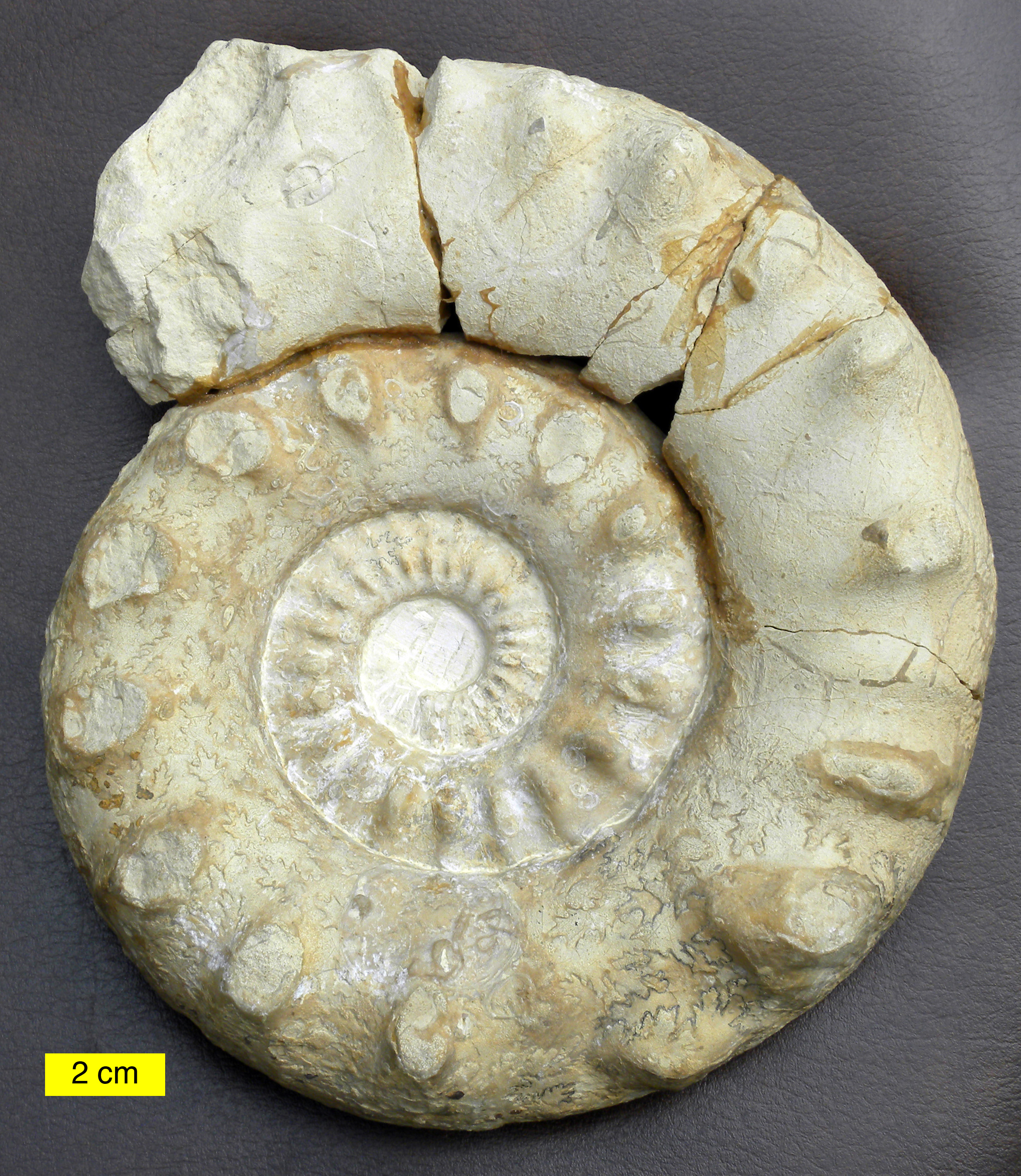
- Peltoceras solidum from the Matmor Formation (Jurassic, Callovian) in Makhtesh Gadol, Israel.

Scientific classification
- Kingdom: Animalia
- Phylum: Mollusca
- Class: Cephalopoda
- Subclass: †Ammonoidea
- Order: †Ammonitida
- Family: †Aspidoceratidae
- Subfamily: †Peltoceratinae
- Genus: †Peltoceras; Waagen, 1871

= Peltoceras =

Peltoceras Temporal range: Callovian

Genus of molluscs (fossil)

Peltoceras is an extinct ammonite genus from the aspidoceratid subfamily Peltoceratinae that lived during the later part of the Middle Jurassic (U Callovian).

The shell of Peltoceras is evolute with whorls hardly embracing, so that all whorls are mostly exposed. The outer rim, which is known as the venter, aligning with the lower part or belly of the animal, is nearly flat. Inner whorls have strong ribs that bifurcate and trifurcate on the ventral margin. The outer whorls have large simple ribs and two rows of massive lateral tubercles, the outer row developing first.
