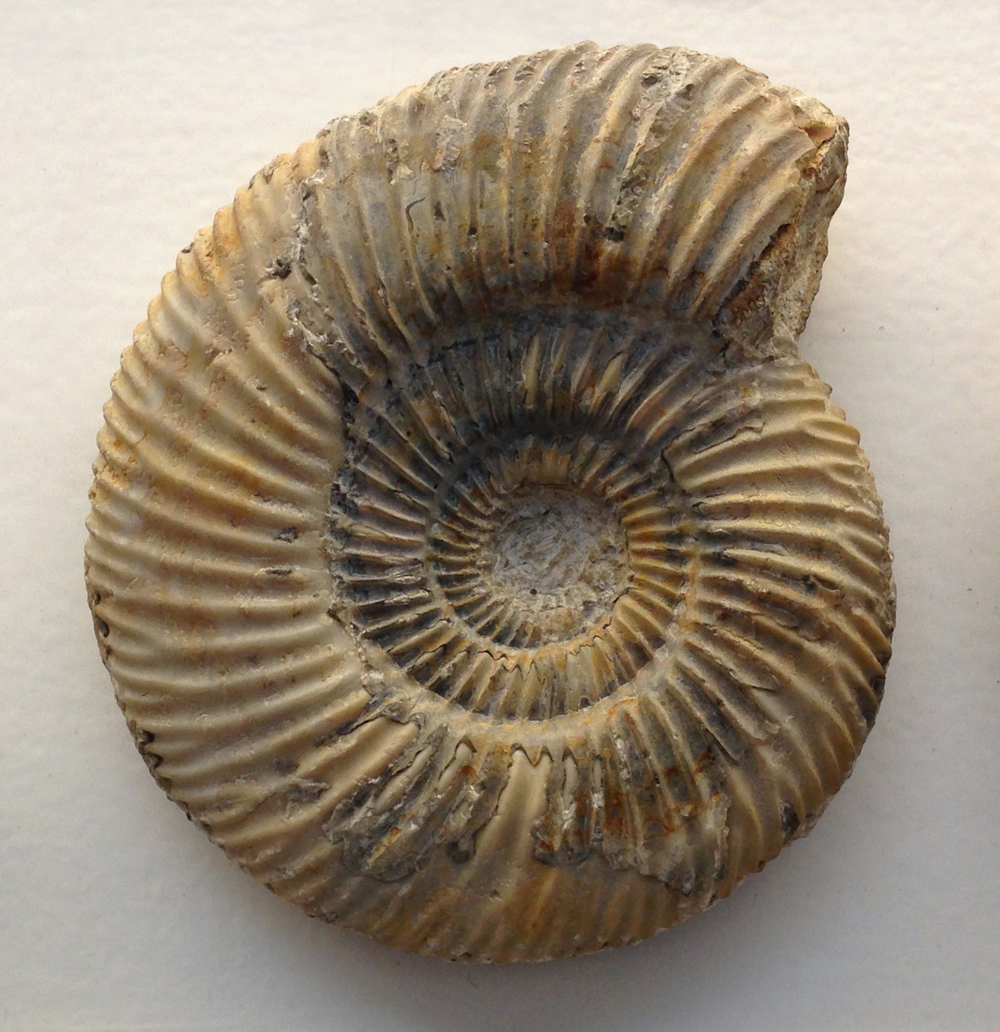
- Fossil of Parkinsonia parkinsoni from Great Britain, on display at the Natural History Museum, London

Scientific classification
- Kingdom: Animalia
- Phylum: Mollusca
- Class: Cephalopoda
- Subclass: †Ammonoidea
- Order: †Ammonitida
- Family: †Parkinsoniidae
- Subfamily: †Parkinsoniinae
- Genus: †Parkinsonia; Bayle, 1878

= Parkinsonia (ammonite) =

Parkinsonia Temporal range: Bajocian–Bathonian

Genus of molluscs (fossil)

Parkinsonia is a genus of ammonites belonging to the family Parkinsoniidae.

These fast-moving nektonic carnivores lived from the Bajocian age to the Bathonian age of the Middle Jurassic.

== Description ==
Parkinsonia species have a compressed spiral shell with strong ribbing.

== Distribution ==
Fossils of species within this genus have been found in the Jurassic of France, Germany, Iran, Russia, United Kingdom, and United States.
