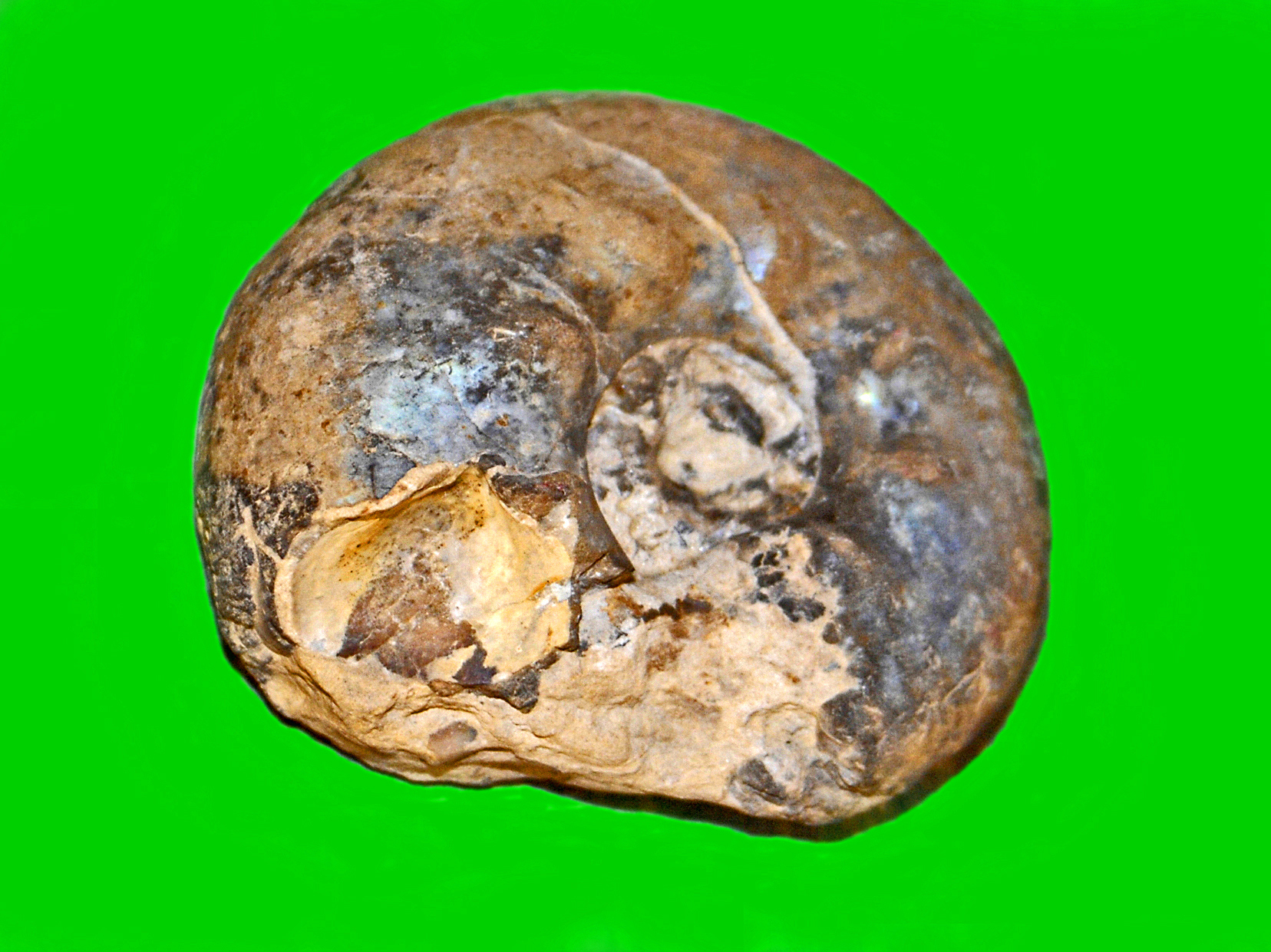
- Craspedites nodiger

Scientific classification
- Kingdom: Animalia
- Phylum: Mollusca
- Class: Cephalopoda
- Subclass: †Ammonoidea
- Order: †Ammonitida
- Superfamily: †Perisphinctoidea
- Family: †Craspeditidae; Spath, 1934

= Craspeditidae =

Craspeditidae Temporal range: Late Jurassic–Early Cretaceous

Extinct family of molluscs

Craspeditidae is an ammonoid cephalopod family included in the Perisphinctoidea superfamily. Some classifiers consider the Craspeditidae a subfamily in the Polyptychitidae.

These ammonites lived during the Late Jurassic and Early Cretaceous.

== Genera ==
- Craspedites †
- Platylenticeras †
- Tolypeceras †
