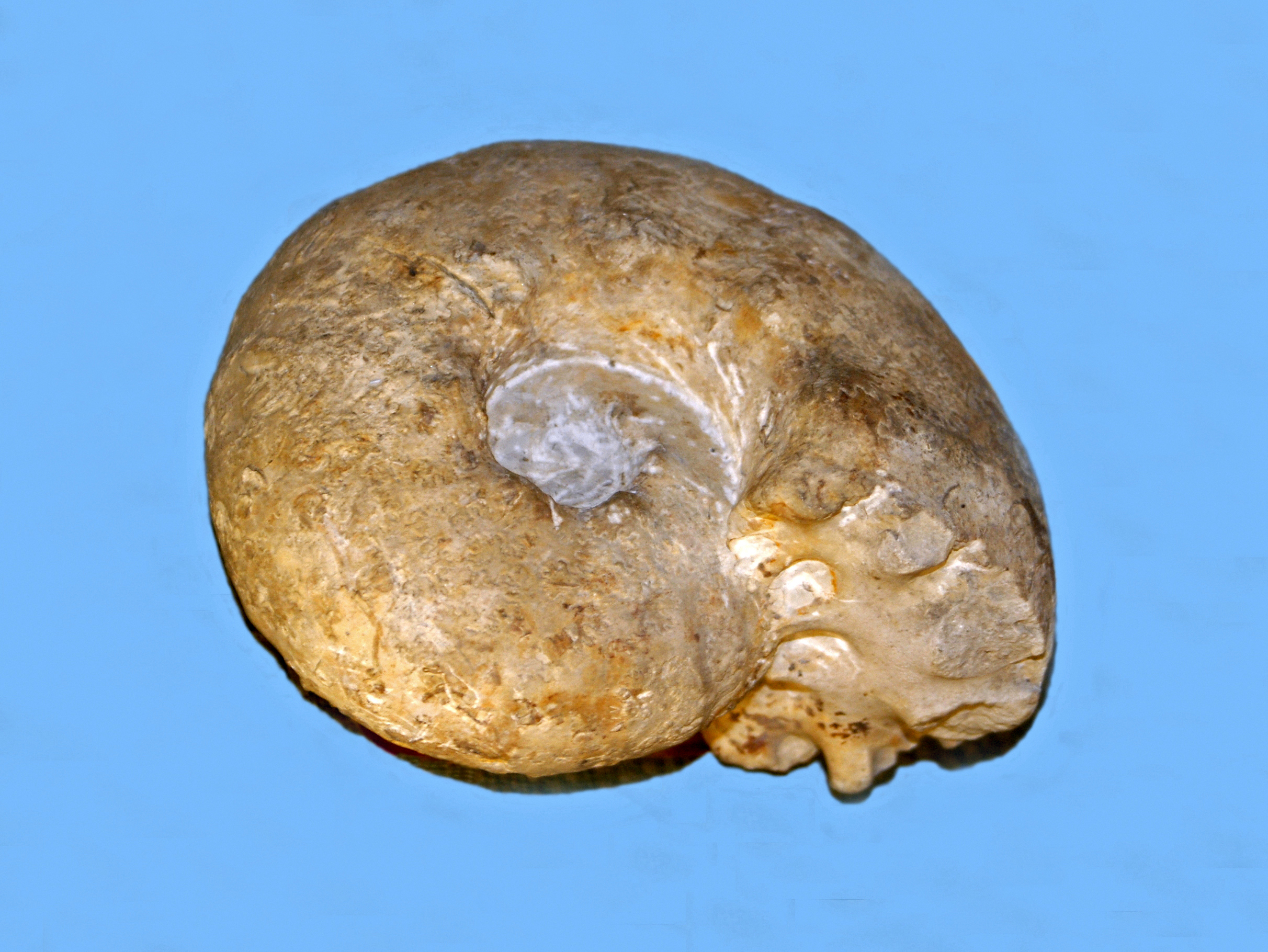
- Fossil shell of Orthaspidoceras schilleri, on display at Galerie de paléontologie et d'anatomie comparée in Paris

Scientific classification
- Kingdom: Animalia
- Phylum: Mollusca
- Class: Cephalopoda
- Subclass: †Ammonoidea
- Order: †Ammonitida
- Family: †Aspidoceratidae
- Genus: †Orthaspidoceras; Spath 1925

Species
- Orthaspidoceras lallerianum (d'Orb.), Orthaspidoceras schilleri (Opp.); Orthaspidoceras orthocera (d' Orb.).

= Orthaspidoceras =

Orthaspidoceras Temporal range: Kimmeridgian

Genus of molluscs (fossil)

Orthaspidoceras is an extinct ammonoid cephalopod genus belonging to the family Aspidoceratidae. These nektonic carnivores lived during the Jurassic period, Kimmeridgian age.

== Description ==
Shells of Orthaspidoceras are medium or large-sized, with a diameter reaching about 20–25 centimetres (7.9–9.8 in). These shells are relatively involute and thick, with a quadrate-rounded or depressed whorls. The ornamentation consists of a row of coarse tubercles and fine streaks.

== Distribution ==
Jurassic deposites of Italy, Mexico, Switzerland and Yemen.
