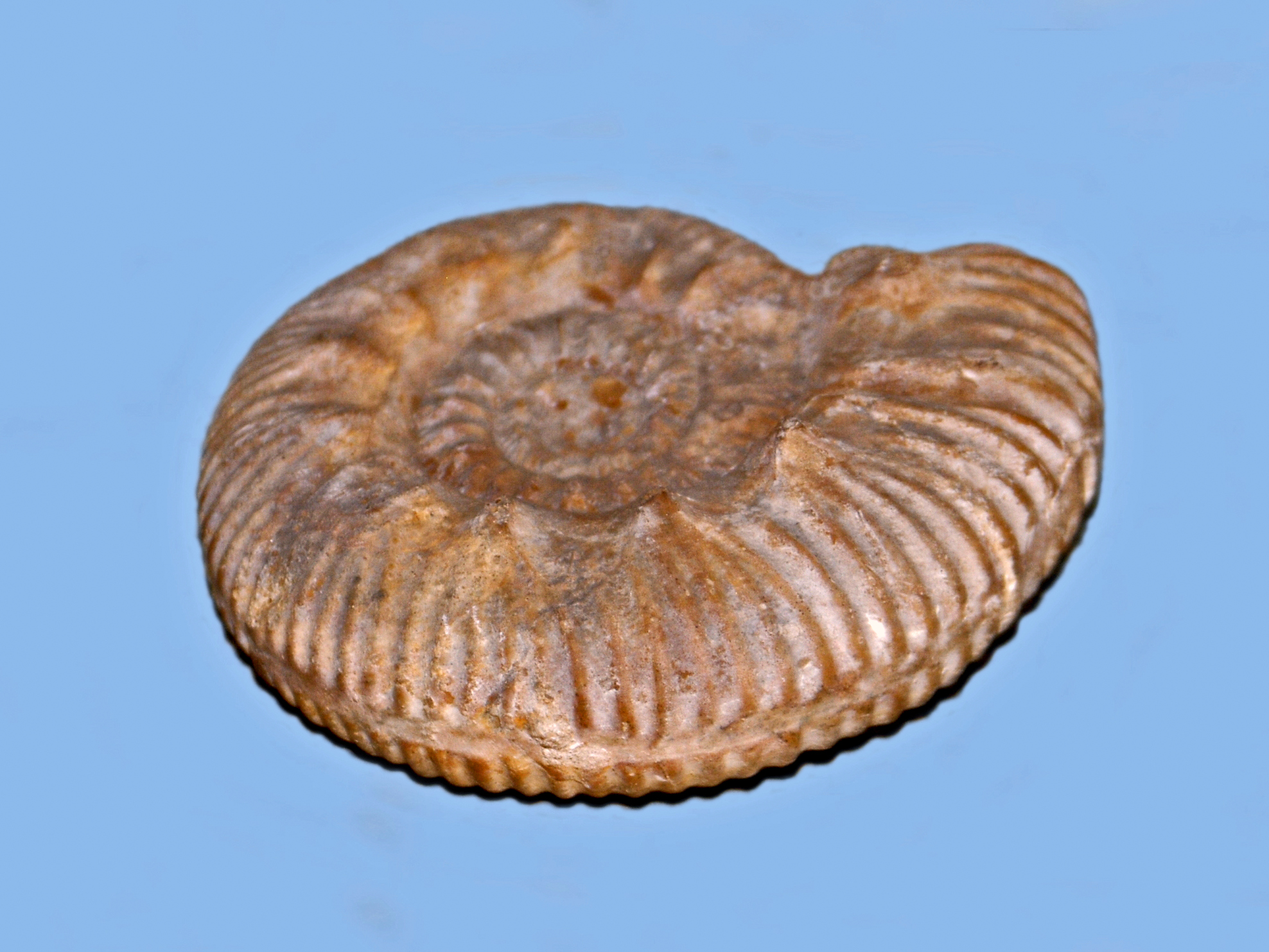
- Fossil shell of Reineckeia anceps from Poitou (France), on display at Galerie de paléontologie et d'anatomie comparée in Paris

Scientific classification
- Kingdom: Animalia
- Phylum: Mollusca
- Class: Cephalopoda
- Subclass: †Ammonoidea
- Order: †Ammonitida
- Superfamily: †Perisphinctoidea
- Family: †Reineckeiidae; Hyatt 1900

= Reineckeiidae =

Reineckeiidae Temporal range: Jurassic, 171.6–155.7 Ma

Extinct family of molluscs

Reineckeiidae is an extinct ammonoid cephalopod family belonging to the superfamily Perisphinctoidea.

These fast-moving nektonic carnivores lived during the Jurassic period, from the Callovian to the Oxfordian.
