= Callovian =

Fourth and last age of the middle Jurassic

- 165.3 ± 1.1 – 161.5 ± 1.0 Ma

Chronology
← / Triassic–Jurassic extinction event
Subdivision of the Jurassic according to the ICS, as of 2024. Vertical axis scale: Millions of years ago

Etymology
- Name formality: Formal

Usage information
- Celestial body: Earth
- Regional usage: Global (ICS)
- Time scale(s) used: ICS Time Scale

Definition
- Chronological unit: Age
- Stratigraphic unit: Stage
- Time span formality: Formal
- Lower boundary definition: FAD of the Ammonite genus Kepplerites
- Lower boundary GSSP candidate section(s): Pfeffingen, Swabian Alb, Germany; Russia
- Upper boundary definition: FAD of ammonite species Brightia thuouxensis
- Upper boundary GSSP candidate section(s): Redcliff Point, Dorset, UK; Savouron, Provence, France

In the geologic timescale, the Callovian is an age and stage in the Middle Jurassic, lasting between 165.3 ± 1.1 Ma (million years ago) and 161.5 ± 1.0 Ma. It is the last stage of the Middle Jurassic, following the Bathonian and preceding the Oxfordian.

== Stratigraphic definitions ==
The Callovian Stage was first described by French palaeontologist Alcide d'Orbigny in 1852. Its name derives from the Latinized name for Kellaways Bridge, a small hamlet 3 km north-east of Chippenham, Wiltshire, England.

The base of the Callovian is defined as the place in the stratigraphic column where the ammonite genus Kepplerites first appears, which is the base of the biozone of Macrocephalites herveyi. A global reference profile (a GSSP) for the base had in 2009 not yet been assigned.

The top of the Callovian (the base of the Oxfordian) is at the first appearance of ammonite species Brightia thuouxensis.

=== Subdivision ===
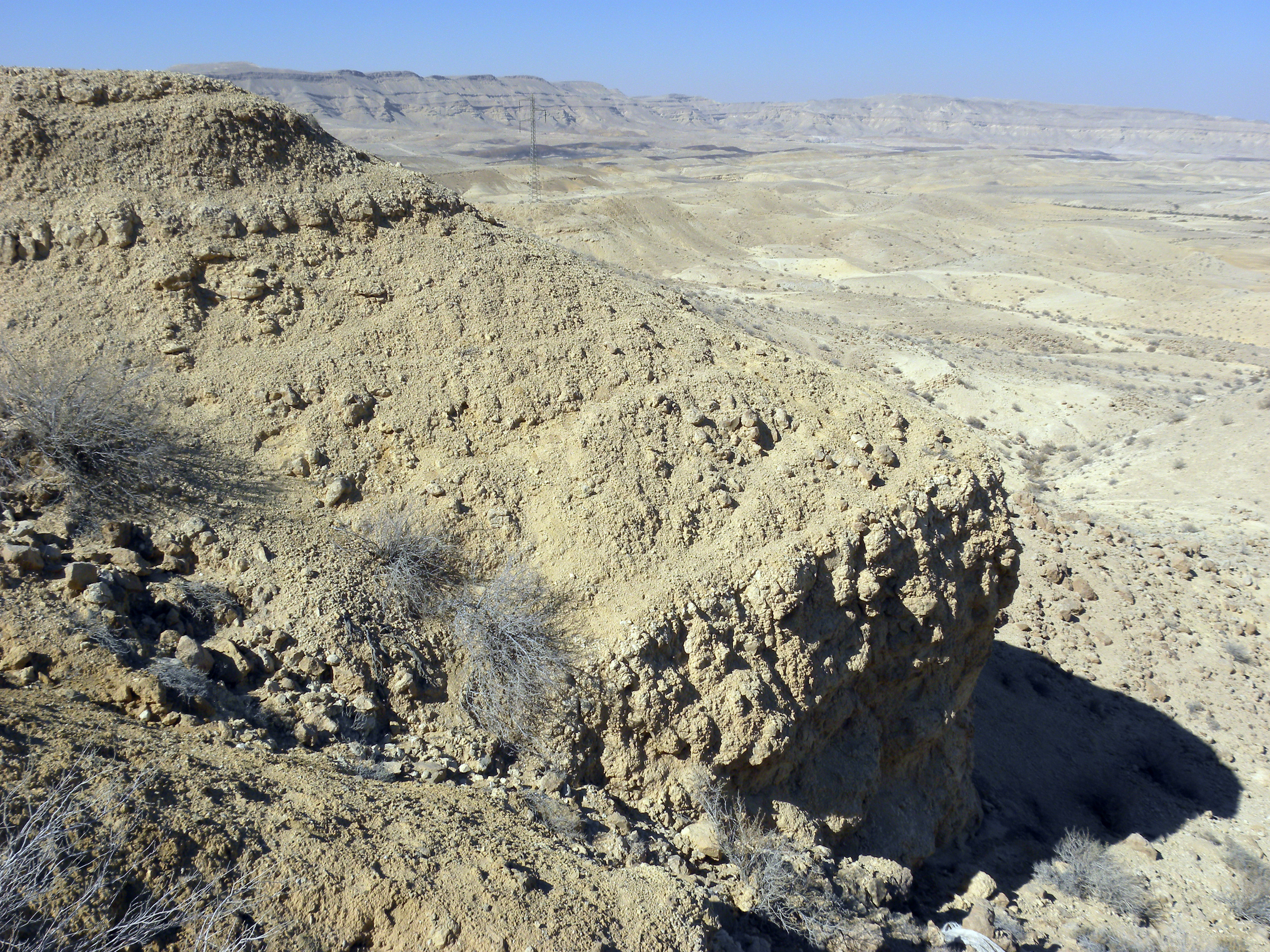
Matmor Formation (Callovian, Peltoceras athleta Zone) in Makhtesh Gadol, Israel.

The Callovian is often subdivided into three substages (or subages): Lower/Early, Middle and Upper/Late Callovian. In the Tethys domain, the Callovian encompasses six ammonite biozones:

- zone of Quenstedtoceras lamberti
- zone of Peltoceras athleta
- zone of Erymnoceras coronatum
- zone of Reineckeia anceps
- zone of Macrocephalites gracilis
- zone of Bullatimorphites bullatus

== Palaeogeography ==
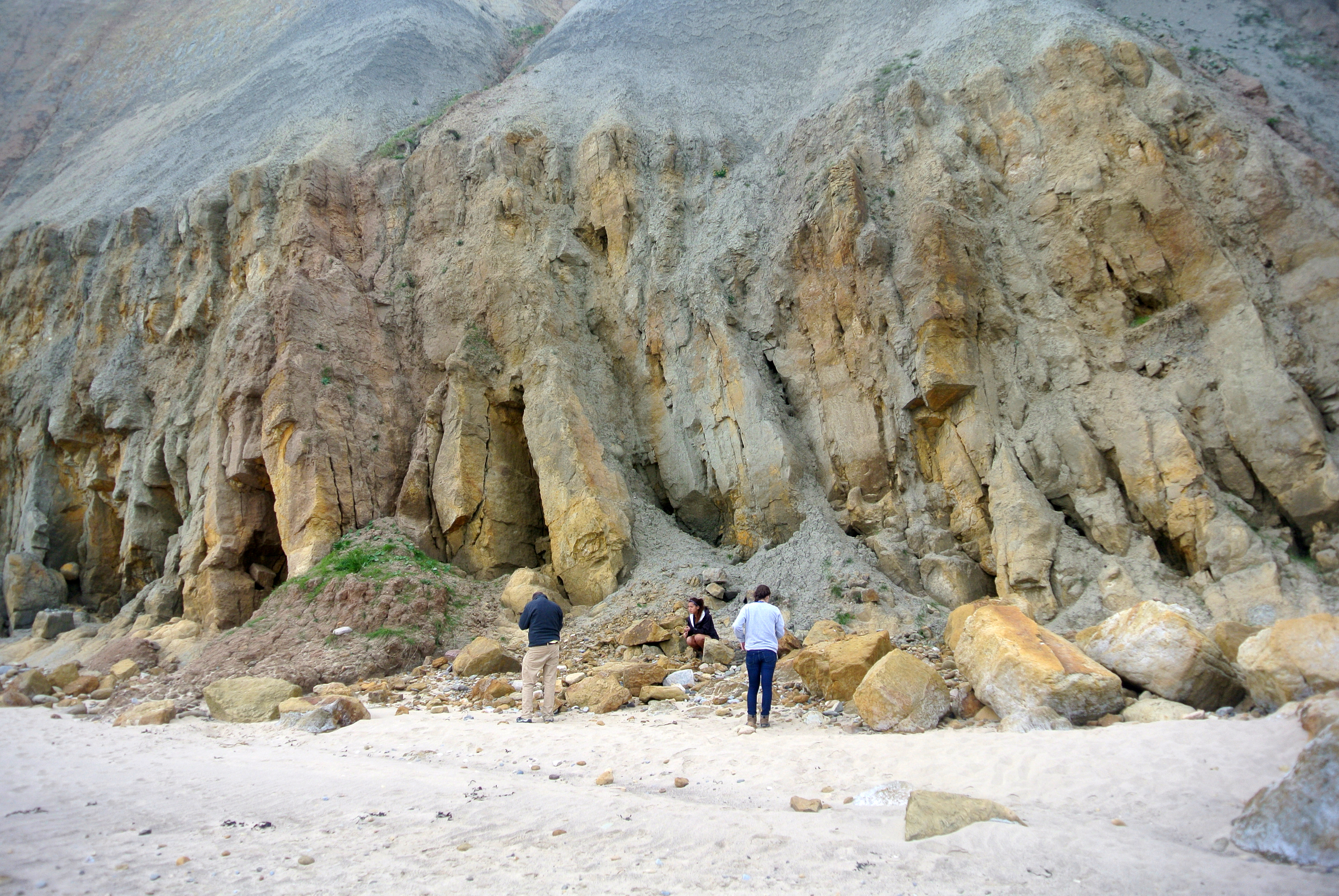
Callovian rocks of the Osgodby Formation at Cayton Bay in North Yorkshire, England

During the Callovian, Europe was an archipelago of a dozen or so large islands. Between them were extensive areas of continental shelf. Consequently, there are shallow marine Callovian deposits in Russia and from Belarus, through Poland and Germany, into France and eastern Spain and much of England. Around the former island coasts are frequently, land-derived sediments. These are to be found, for example, in western Scotland.

The Louann Salt and the southern Campeche Salt of the Gulf of Mexico are thought to have formed by an embayment of the Pacific Ocean across modern-day Mexico.
