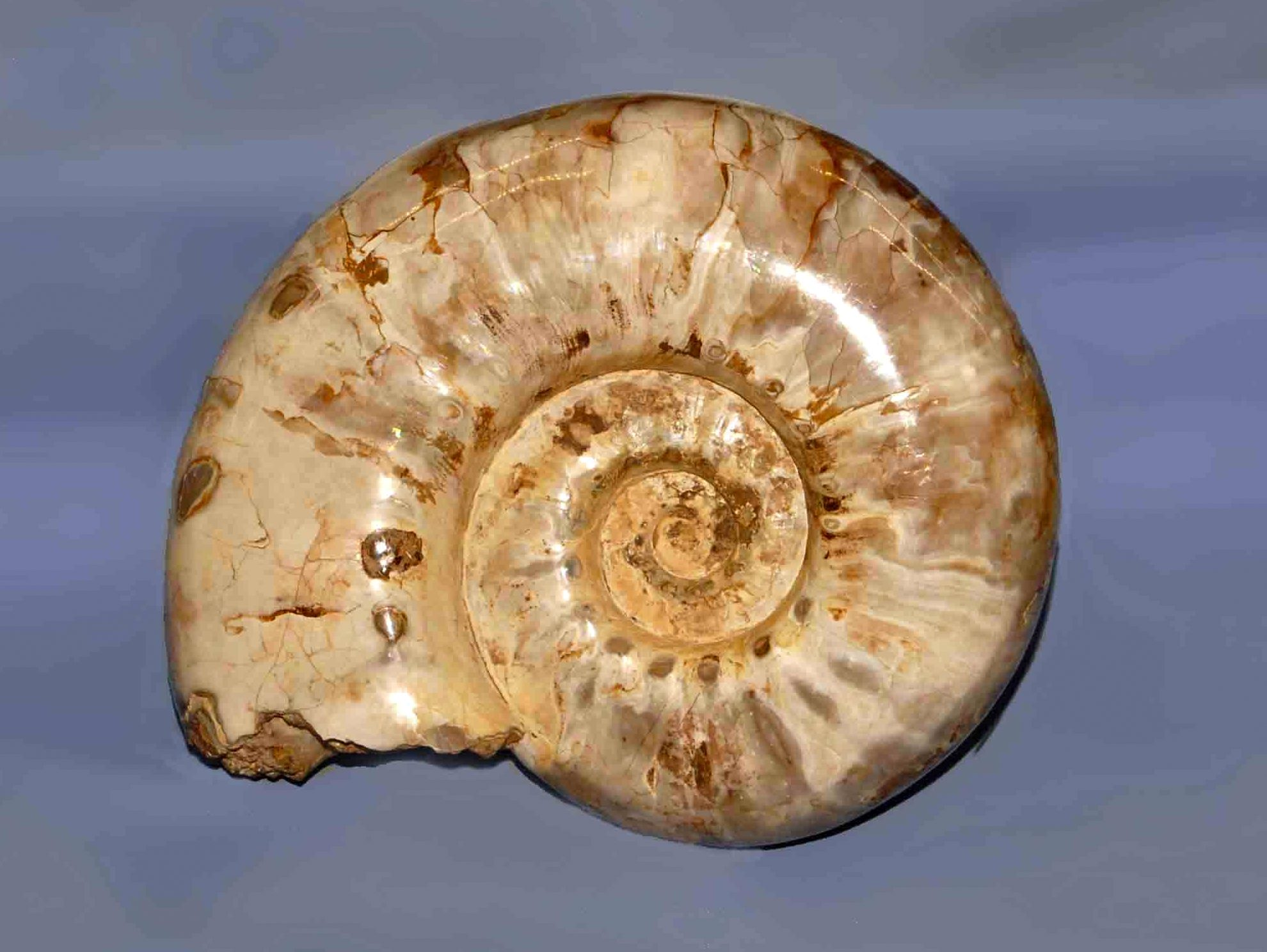
- Pseudowaagenia micropla from Madagascar

Scientific classification
- Kingdom: Animalia
- Phylum: Mollusca
- Class: Cephalopoda
- Subclass: †Ammonoidea
- Order: †Ammonitida
- Superfamily: †Perisphinctoidea
- Family: †Aspidoceratidae; Zittel, 1895

= Aspidoceratidae =

Aspidoceratidae Temporal range: Middle Jurassic–Upper Jurassic

Extinct family of ammonites

The Aspidoceratidae comprise a family of middle and upper Jurassic ammonites that make up part of the superfamily Perisphinctoidea, characterized by evolute shells, commonly stocky, that tend to develop tubercles.

The Aspidoceratidae are thought to be derived from the Perisphinctidae and have been subdivided into three subfamilies, the Aspidoceratinae, Peltoceratinae, and Simoceratinae.

== Subfamilies and genera ==
- Aspidoceratinae Zittel 1895
  - Aspidoceras
  - Chinamecaceras Cantu-Chapa 2006
  - Epaspidoceras
  - Euaspidoceras
  - Orthaspidoceras
- Peltoceratinae Spath 1924
  - Peltoceras
  - Peltoceratoides
  - Rursiceras
- Simoceratinae
  - Simoceras
  - Virgatosimoceras
