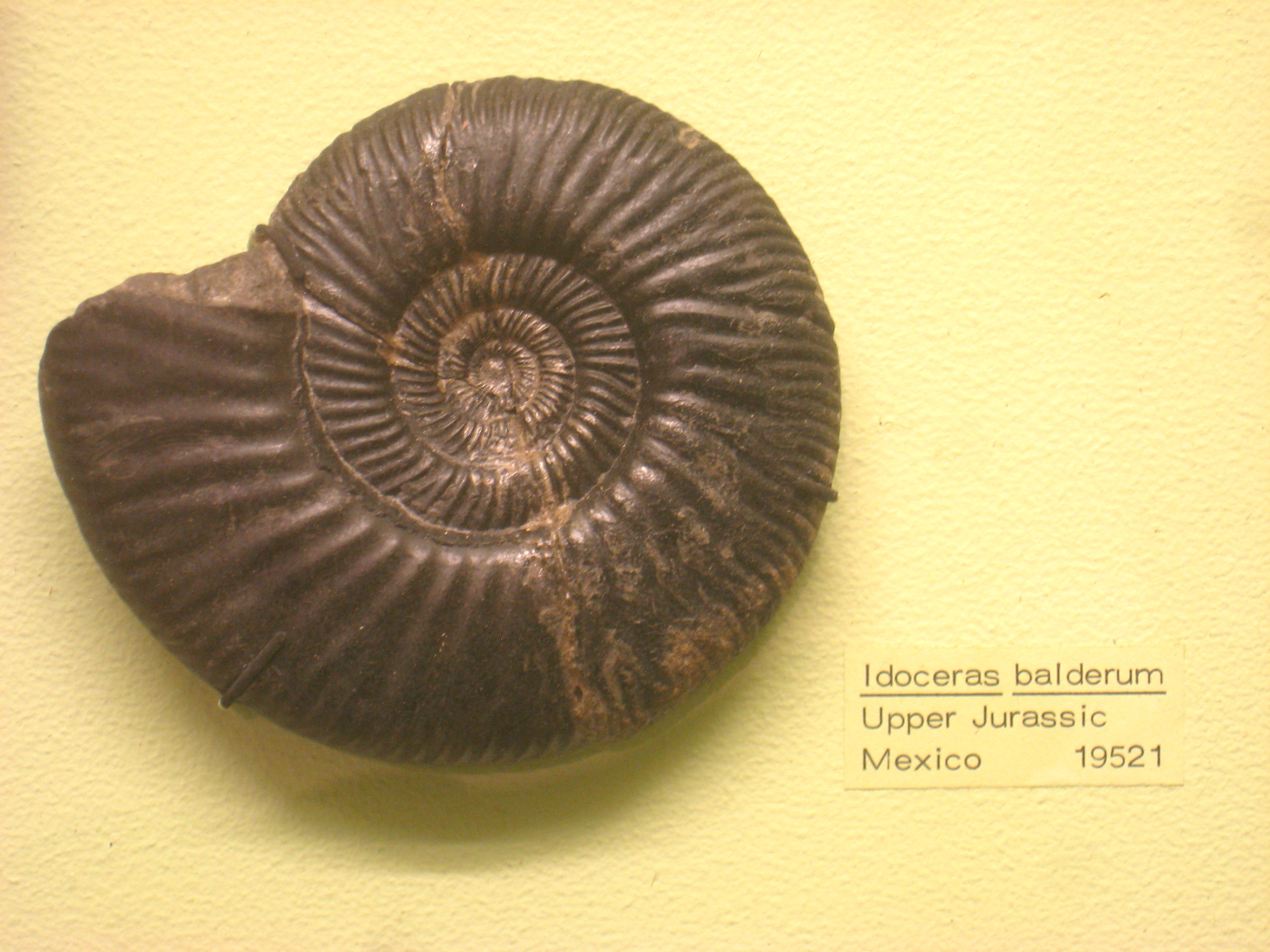
- Idoceras balderum

Scientific classification
- Kingdom: Animalia
- Phylum: Mollusca
- Class: Cephalopoda
- Subclass: †Ammonoidea
- Order: †Ammonitida
- Suborder: †Ammonitina
- Superfamily: †Perisphinctoidea; Steinmann, 1890

Families
- See text

Synonyms
- Perisphinctaceae

= Perisphinctoidea =

Perisphinctoidea Temporal range: Bajocian–Barremian

Extinct superfamily of ammonites

Perisphinctoidea, formerly Perisphinctaceae, is a superfamily of Middle Jurassic (Bajocian) to Lower Cretaceous (Barremian) ammonites, commonly with evolute shells with strong ribbing that typically divides about mid flank before crossing the venter.

== Classification ==
Some 16 families have been recognized in the Perisphinctoidea. The following is based on Donovan et al. 1981 with modification from the Treatise on Invertebrate Paleontology, Part L (1957)

- Perisphinctidae: Middle and Upper Jurassic root stock, derived from the Stephanoceratidae

(Middle Jurassic direct derivatives of the Perisphinctidae)

- Morphoceratidae
- Tulitidae
- Reineckeiidae
- Pachyceratidae
- Aspidoceratidae

(early Upper Jurassic (Oxfordian) derivatives of Perisphinctidae)

- Aulacostephanidae
- Ataxioceratidae

(mid Upper Jurassic (Kimmeridgian) derivatives of the Ataxioceratidae)

- Dorsoplanitidae
- Virgatitidae

(late Upper Jurassic (Tithonian) derivatives of Perisphinctidae)

- Simoceratidae
- Himalayitidae
- Olcostephanidae
- Holcodiscidae (indirect, from Olcostaphanidae)(now placed in the suberfamily Desmoceratoidea)

(Lower Cretaceous Perisphinctoidea (Berriasan - Hauterivien)

- Berriasellidae (derived from Ataxioceratidae)(now considered a subfamily of Neocomitidae)
- Polytichitidae [=Craspeditidae] (derived from Dorsoplanitidae)
- Neocomitidae (derived from Berriasellidae)(now placed in the superfamily Endemoceratoidea)
- Oosterellidae (Hauterivian derivative of the Neocomitidae)
