= Úrkút Manganese Ore Formation =

Jurassic geologic formation in Hungary

- Stratigraphic range: Toarcian; ~184–179 Ma
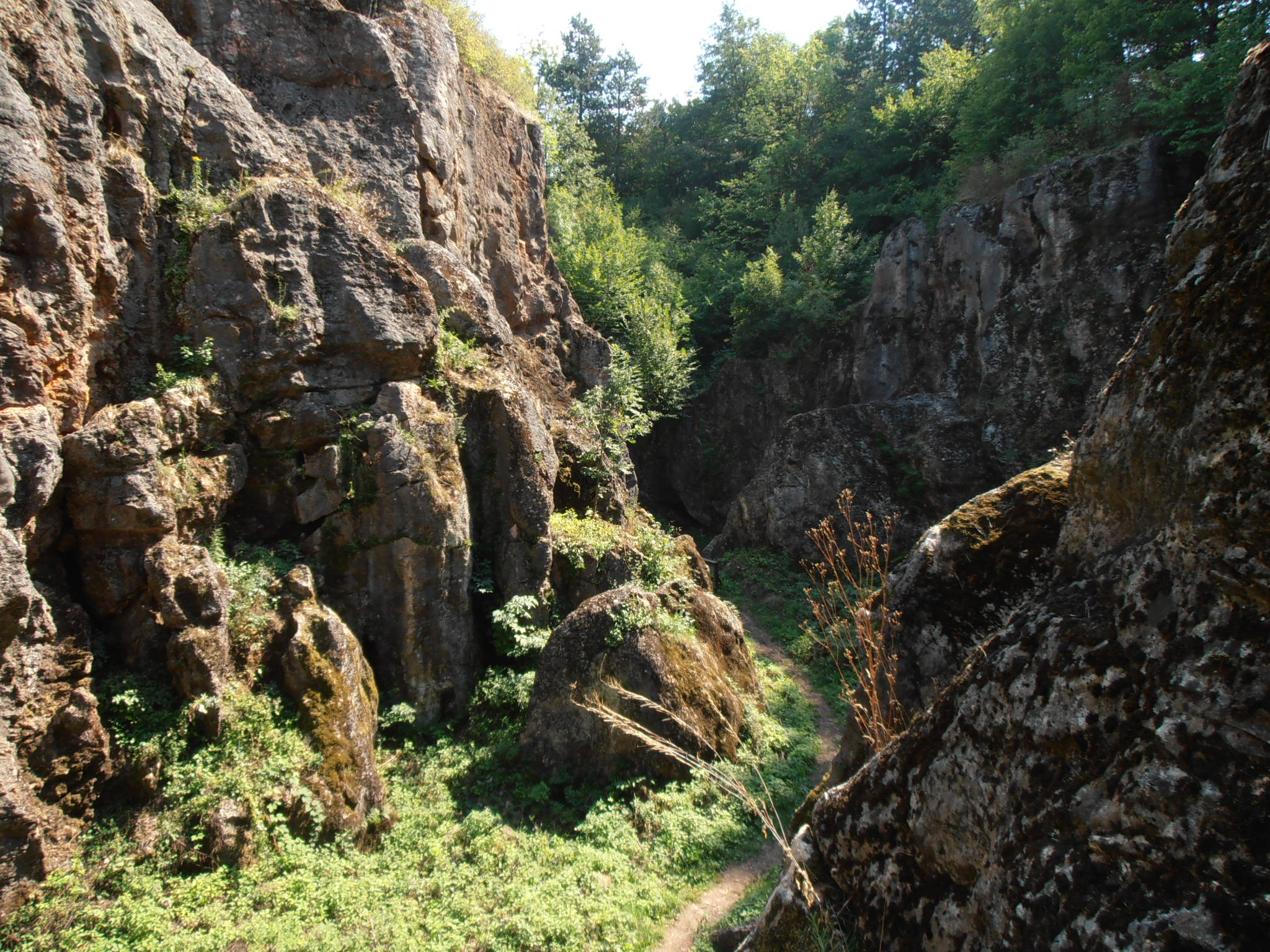
- Ancient karst formation in an abandoned manganite quarry in Úrkút
- Type: Geological formation
- Unit of: Úrkút Basin
- Underlies: Épleny Limestone Formation
- Overlies: Isztimér Formation
- Thickness: 15 m (49 ft)

Lithology
- Primary: Manganese
- Other: Rhodochrosite

Location
- Region: Central Mountains of Transdanubia
- Country: Hungary
- Extent: ~12 km (7.5 mi) by 4–6 km (2.5–3.7 mi)

Type section
- Named for: Úrkút
- Named by: Drubina-Szabo
- Year defined: 1959
- Úrkút Manganese Ore Formation (Hungary)

The Úrkút Manganese Ore Formation is a Jurassic geologic formation in Hungary. It covers the Early Toarcian stage of the Early Jurassic, and it is one of the main regional units linked to the Toarcian Anoxic Events. Different fossils heve been recovered on the locations, including marine life such as Ammonites Fish and terrestrial fossils, such as Palynomorphs and fossil wood. Úrkút (17´38'E and 47´05'N) and Eplény (17´55'E and 47´12'N) are the main deposits of the Formation. Are related to the Bakony Range, an ancient massif that was uplifted gradually and exposed to a long period of erosion, where the deposits of Úrkút appear to be a basin inclined gently to the north, while the highest point to the south is the basalt mass of Kab Mountain. Eplény region consists of a broad N-S trending open valley between fiat-topped, small hills.

== Geology ==
The Urkut Area is part of the Bakony Tectonic Block, with the abundant presence of faults dividing the region into several segments. The terrain where the Manganese Ore is developed is characterised by a high fracturation, where the Jurassic beds and shale lent themselves readily to deformation, with minor folds, faults and shear zones. During the geological evolution of the Bakony range a series of principal fractures were active repeatedly, yielding to vertical as well as horizontal forces that ultimately produced the structural make-up controlling the present topographic configuration of the area. The Jurassic sediments, along the other Mesozoic aged strata were deposited in a branch of a Geosyncline, connected with the Alpine coeval biota. On the Triassic-Jurassic boundary Kimmerian movements take place, as evidenced by the change observed on the texture of the local Calcareous sediments, interpreted as a gradual rising of the sea bottom. To the end of the Lower Jurassic, on the Toarcian, there are several records of another series of pulses from Kimmerian movements, that resulted in partial emergence, which dates the beginning of Karst development on the Csirda Mountain. However, marine sedimentation continued over most of the region and the sea became more widespread. On this time a global sea transgression occur, where on the Úrkút basin shallow-water sediments accumulated near the margins, and with progressive deepening of the sea bottom until the end of late Liassic time, sediments of correspondingly deeper water were deposited. Due to a cut-off of water circulation there were a series of changes on the local development of the basin, which led to the accumulation of the manganese minerals.

The Éplény Area shows a structure and geological development with minor differences from those of Úrkút, being considered overall identical. However, it suffered minor deformation during the late Kimmerian movements, and instead of the Austrian movements, the Subhercynian and Laramide movements produced important structures. After the Pyrenean and Savian movements, the Éplény area started to sink slowly and to receive marine sediments, emerging later on the Middle Miocene. The manganese ore group of beds appears in an absolutely different way according to evolution in Eplény, where while in Úrkút 4 beds can be divided, in Eplény, the 3 beds appear usually with sharp boundary, in reduced thickness.

== Stratigraphy ==
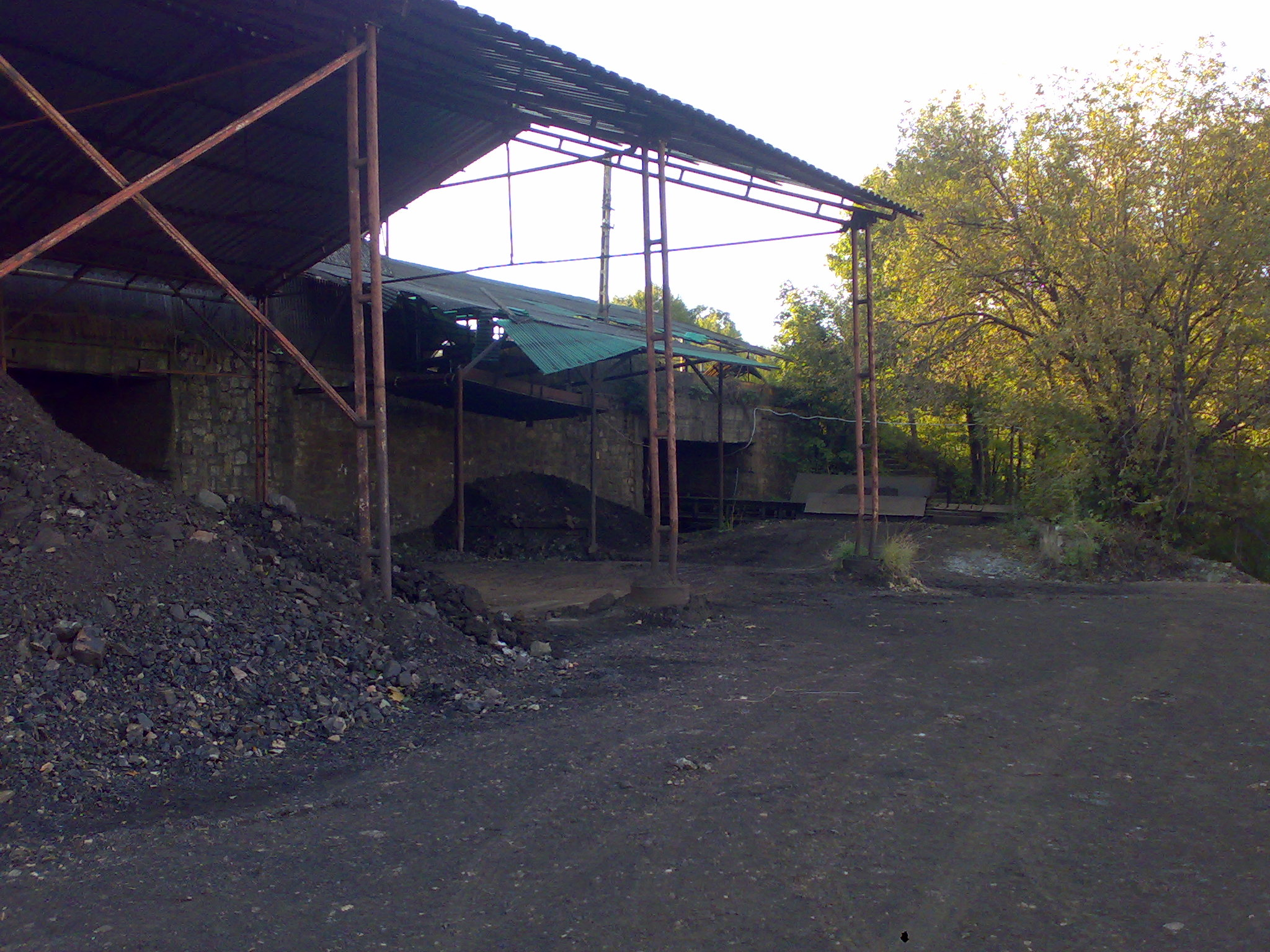
Local Manganese Mine

The oldest formations on the Úrkút basin are referred to the Upper Triassic Dolomite range and the Dachstein Limestone of Raetian age. After the deposition of the Triassic rocks a series of Jurassic strata successions have overlain the older deposits, with its lowermost contact found on the uppermost strata of the own Dachstein Limestone, developing a lower Liassic sequence that is a white, yellowish-gray or pink, dense Limestone resembling that of the Dachstein. Over it, there is a series of younger liassic strata and a Crinoid-Brachiopod and Rhynchonellatan bearing reddish Limestone, that resembles the Sinemurian Hierlatz Limestone of the Csárda Mountain, that is the last unit under the coeval Manganese deposits from there. Late Pliensbachian strata is composed by nodular and cherty red limestone with abundant ammonites and brachiopods, that belong to the Isztimér Formation. On the uppermost Pliensbachian strata there is a series of beds that consists of greenish-gray limestone and marl, which also contain crinoids and brachiopods, being the last unit under the Manganese Ore. The Upper Liassic (Toarcian) sequence is composed mostly by the Úrkút Manganese and the Éplény Limestone (Late Toarcian-Aalenian), and starts with thick-bedded, gray, Radiolaria-bearing, argillaceous marl containing several intercalations of manganese carbonate, or rarely, manganese oxides, with the top of the sequence being a brown to purple nodular Limestone with light green spots. Middle Jurassic overlaying these deposits, being mostly a series of cherty Marlstone containing the genus Posidonomya and several types of Radiolaria. The Late Jurassic strata is vanished locally, with the Cretaceous sedimentation starting with several continental beds with Bauxite and accompanying Laterites. Finally, on the Tertiary, the Lower Eocene continental clay and bauxite are overlain by gray carbonaceous clay and sandstone, with the Jurassic beds and manganiferous beds eroded.

== Lithology ==
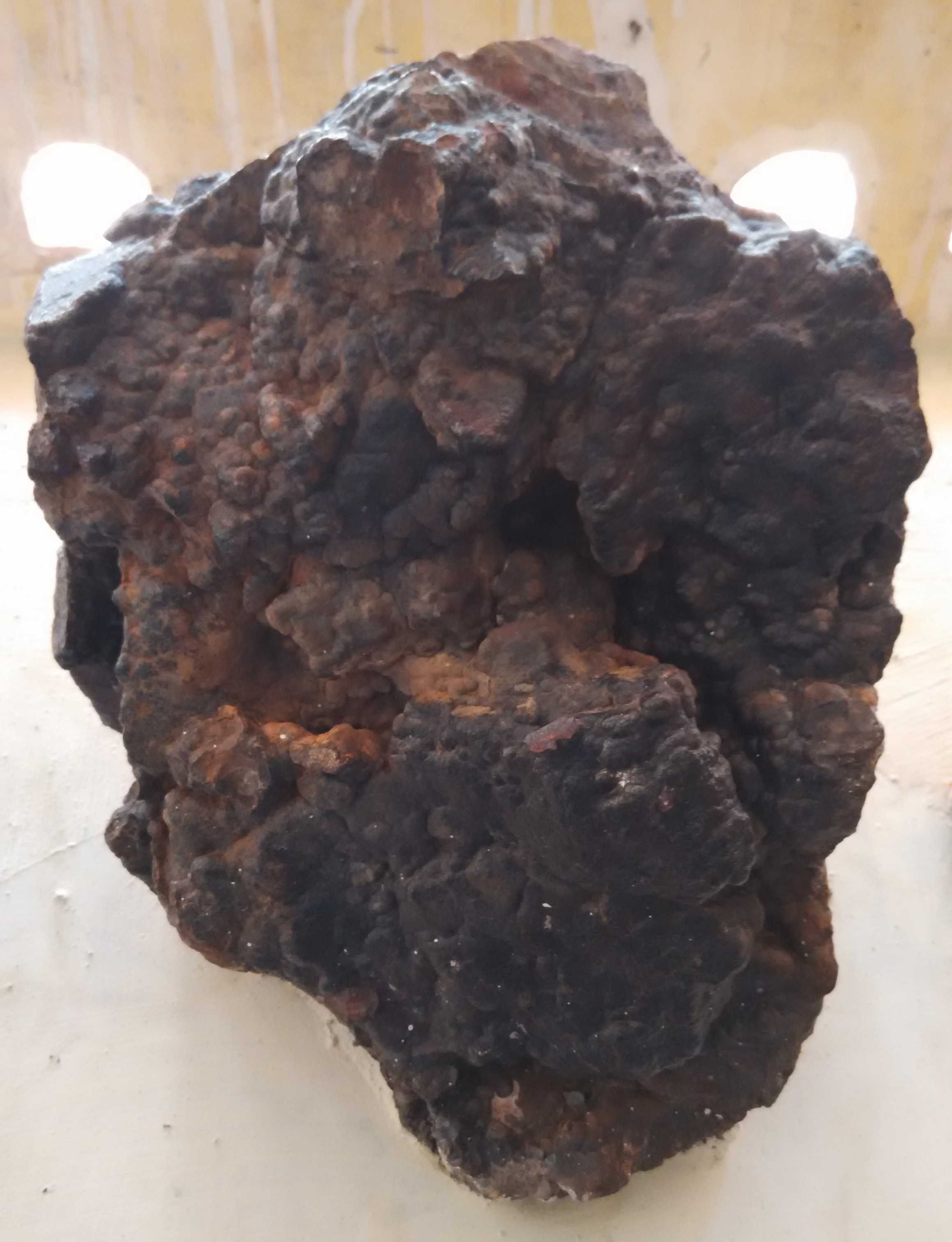
Manganese ores are the main lithologic component of the formation, related with depth Volcanic-Hydrothermal conditions

The Manganese Ore is the main component of the formation, and its distinctive characteristic element. The Úrkút Manganese ores occur on marine sedimentary rocks composed mainly of bioclastic Limestone, radiolarian Clay Marlstone, and dark-gray to Black Shale. The Origin of the Local Manganese Ores based on the presence of siliceous manganese ores and antauthigenic Silica points to the volcanogenic-sedimentary origin of this Mn-ore deposits Manganese nodules are widely distributed in the area in Jurassic rocks, mainly on the Lower Jurassic, but younger nodules also occur. The Black Shale with Mn-carbonate get its maximum deposition on the Toarcian, concretely during the Tenuicostatum–Falciferum Ammonite zones in the coeval Sachrang Formation, Strubberg Formation and Allgäu Formation in the Northern Calcareous Alps and the Eastern Alps (Austria, Germany and Switzerland), while Úrkút and related deposits were the regional equivalent in the Transdanubian Range. There are other deposits with Shale and associated Mn particles on contemporaneous oxic deposits occur that formed under similar environmental conditions. The Úrkút Manganese deposit has been investigated geologically, mineralogically and chemically. It has several properties, including very fine grain size (~ 1 μm), an enrichment of metals over a geologically very short time (-500 thousand years). Both Metals and the Manganese have been related with local hydrothermal vent systems, where the metal enrichment was a result of microbial activity. There are at least three types of Manganese deposits that occur close in proximity. The first, those with cherty Fe–Mn-oxide ore, developed on the margins of the much larger carbonate ore body, whose origin has been related with proximal fracture systems, being composed by varicolored metalliferous Claystone. Other type includes the so-called Csárda-hill, where it is very cherty and iron-rich, and is suggested as originated from a low-temperature fluid flow along an associated fracture zone. This deposit is associated with sedimentary dykes, filled with red Lime-Mudstone, varicoloured Claystone, carbonate debris, or Mn oxides. The last type is the Black Shale-hosted Mn-carbonate, considered a distal ore-forming environment, where the Mn-carbonate proto-ore sediment accumulated. A hydrothermal/exhalative source of metals may have contributed to the formation of the deposits of Black Shale.

There is a rhodochrosite ore, composed of laminated gray, green, brown, and black sections, and is associated with a diagenetic origin. Rhodochrosite concretions with fish and plant fossils are common on the strata, composed by Mn-bearing Calcite with traces of hydroxyl-apatite, kutnohorite, smectite, quartz, feldspar, barite, pyrite, and quartz-cristobalite. Mineralized sections do not contain fossils or traces of benthic fauna, and contain only rarely fish remnants, planktonic organisms as well as silicified, manganized, or coalified plant fragments.

Celadonite and smectite, especially the first, had particular importance for understanding the genesis of the Úrkút manganese ore. Celadonite and nontronite indicate paleo-oxygen level variations in the environment. There are well-crystallised celadonite occurrences that was formed by primary precipitation, differing from the known celadonite occurrences in that it is not found in direct association with submarine basic volcanic rocks, although being any evidence for volcanic contribution to the local ore genesis. The Smectite is also found on the lower Pliensbachian Limestone. Nearly every Sample on Úrkút contains interstratified Illite/smectite.

The Rn220 and Rn222 concentration in the Úrkút Manganese Formation is anomalously high, and it causes health risk for the attendants of the Úrkút Manganese Mine, which is considered to be related to active fossil Biomat (bacterial action) which leads local minerals to adsorb different atoms or ions, whether they are radiogenic or not.

== Paleoenvironment ==
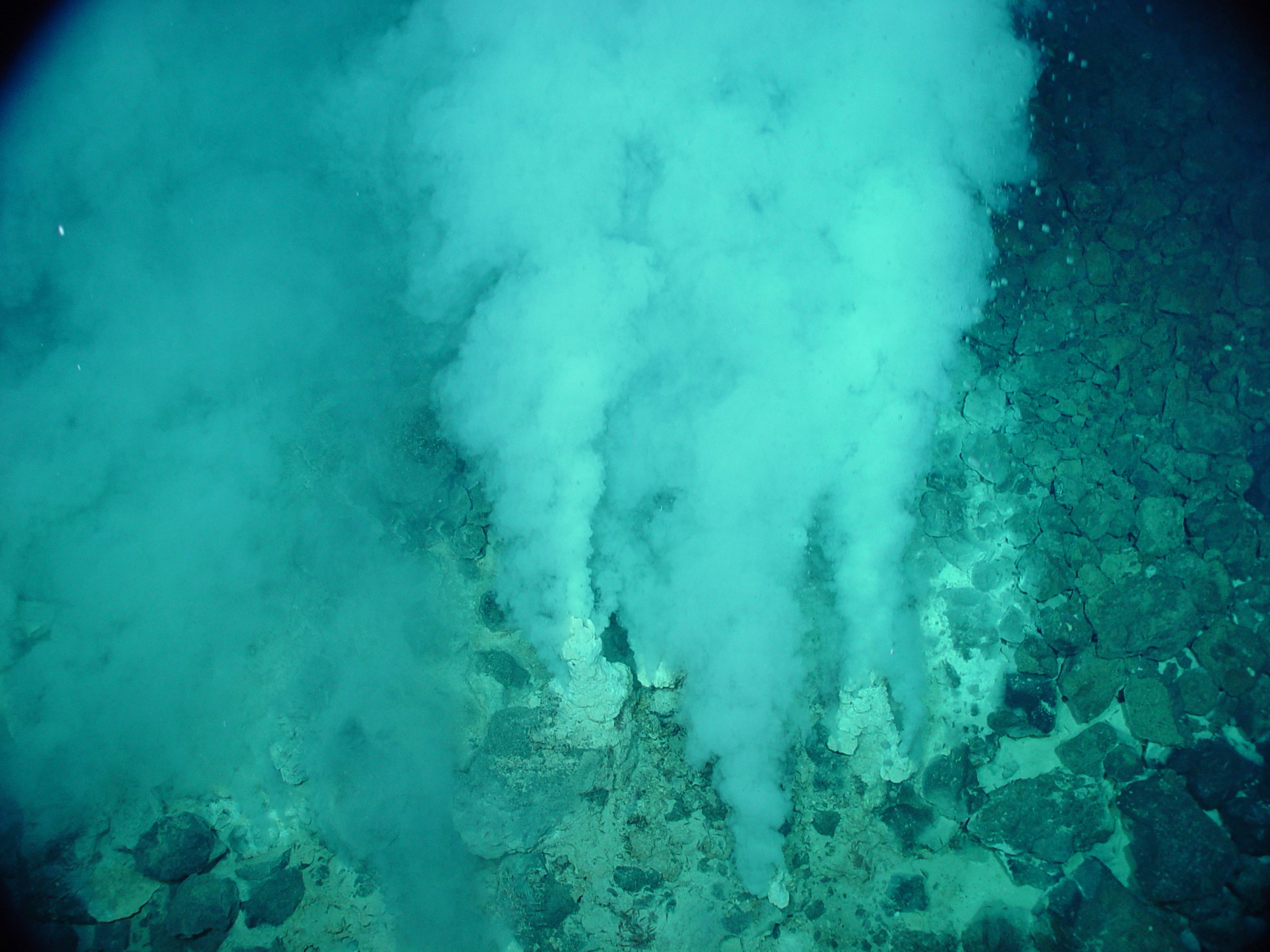
The Manganese Ore records Pelagic settings with Volcanic influence

Black Shale is present worldwide in the lower Toarcian, linked to the anoxic events that took place, in Úrkút locally related with deposits of Manganese Ore. Being part of the Transdanubian Range, the Úrkút Manganese Ore was linked to the environmental evolution of the southern passive margin of the rifting Tethys Ocean. After Hettangian drowning and Sinemurian-Pliensbachian extensional tectonics and subsidence, along with pelagic sedimentation and submarine topography, a pronounced horst developed over the local sea, with a depth on the Pliensbachian-Toarcian Basin of 600 m. The environment of the Formation was linked to 2 settings: a series of pelagic basins, including the Zala Basin and the own Úrkút and Eplieny Basins, related to open marine conditions where bioturbation is scarce, but there is a great amount of planktonic organisms, associated with a suboxic to anoxic conditions. Radiolarians, sponge spicules, crinoid ossicles, bivalves, gastropods, ammonites and fish were recovered as the main local biota, deposited on a 20–40 m basinal ore sequence. The Other deposits come from the near emerged lands, that include the Gerecse Hills, Vértes Hills and the Bakony Hills, whose biota has been recovered on the formation by palynological analysis and fossil wood.

More recent studies support the lack of any igneous event during Pliensbachian and Toarcian times in the Úrkút Basin. The Smectite formation lacks igneous rocks, tuffs, or volcanic glasses. Although, it can be due to changes in the fluctuation on the basin. Observed Mn veins and their above-proposed formation mechanism do not eliminate the possibility of tectonically formed Neptunian dikes elsewhere in the basin, which could well fit in the local, general tectonic environment observed, for instance in Eplény.

In this setting volcanism was the main local event, where eroded near basaltic sequences provided a metallic source for the ore, being channeled by suboxic waters to the Úrkút Basin. The local tectonic activity created fractures and deep faults and there was a development of endogenic thermal effects, such as degassing and the release of solutions, along with the mixing of syngenetic ash falls that deposited Fe into the carbonate rocks. The fine Volcanic material was altered on the Marine sediments. The local hydrothermal emanations in the deep fault zones, where bacterial activity caused the precipitation of large amounts of metal ions in the form of very fine-grained oxyhydroxides. Meanwhile, the accumulation of dead bacteria created a mass of very reactive organic matter. Under aerobic conditions, the action of the microbial oxidation led to the local accumulation of Mn oxides that ended being Ca-rhodochrosite, and supported Celadonite formation by mixing of geological fluids with seawater. It has been calculated 563 years for the duration of ore local formation based on an estimated 3 weeks for a microbial population growth cycle.

The local manganese ore is, in reality, a Mn-ore series of stromatolite with a volcanic tuff component, that was later transformed by diagenetic processes. The modern analog of this environment of the Úrkút Manganese Ore basinal deposits would be flourishing Prokaryotic bacteria colonies located in submarine vent systems, normally related with remnants of proto-rifts or failed rift systems on continental crust in a submarine environment. The local environments are interpreted as hydrothermal vent systems of cooler temperatures.

== Fossils ==
=== Bivalves ===
Genus	Species	Material	Location	Notes	Images
Pseudomytiloides	P. dubius	Shells	Úrkút quarry.	A Clam of the family Inoceramidae.	
Solemya	S. bollensis; S. voltzi	Shells	Úrkút quarry.	A Clam of the family Solemyidae.	

=== Brachiopoda ===
The dominant group are the Terebratulids, while Strophomenids play a significant role. While the Brachiopods and Gastropods are more abundant on the underlying Hiertlaz Formation, but also continuous on the Úrkút and Épleny quarries. In the very rich fauna of the local seamount slope the orders Terebratulida and Rhynchonellida play an equally important role, but the basin areas are characterized by a low-diversity fauna dominated by large terebratulids.

Genus	Species	Material	Location	Notes	Images
Linguithyris	L. aspasia	Shells	Úrkút quarry.; Épleny quarry; Kericser (Lókút).	A Rhynchonellatan of the family Nucleatidae.	

=== Gastropoda ===
Genus	Species	Material	Location	Notes	Images
Amberleya	A. capitaneus	Shells	Úrkút quarry.; Épleny quarry; Kericser (Lókút).	A Sea Snail of the family Eucyclidae.	

=== Cephalopoda ===
Genus	Species	Material	Location	Notes	Images
Calliphylloceras	C. spadae	Shells	Úrkút quarry.; Épleny quarry; Csernye quarry	An Ammonite of the family Phylloceratidae.	
Cenoceras	C. aratus	Shells	Úrkút quarry.; Épleny quarry; Csernye quarry	A Nautilidan of the family Cenoceratidae.	
Dactylioceras	D. sp.	Shells	Úrkút quarry.; Épleny quarry; Csernye quarry	An Ammonite of the family Dactylioceratidae.	
Hildaites	H. crassus; H. cf. forte; H. sp.	Shells	Úrkút quarry.; Épleny quarry; Csernye quarry	An Ammonite of the family Hildoceratidae.	
Lytoceras	L. sp.	Shells	Úrkút quarry.; Épleny quarry; Csernye quarry	An Ammonite of the family Lytoceratidae.	
Protogrammoceras	P. (Paltarpites) paltum; P. sp.	Shells	Úrkút quarry.; Épleny quarry; Csernye quarry	An Ammonite of the family Hildoceratidae.	
Zetoceras	Z. cf. zetes	Shells	Úrkút quarry.; Épleny quarry; Csernye quarry	An Ammonite of the family Phylloceratidae.	

=== Fish ===
Genus	Species	Material	Location	Notes	Images
Caturus	C. sp.	Single complete specimen	Úrkút quarry.	A bony fish of the family Caturidae.	
Dapedium	D. sp.	Single complete specimen	Úrkút quarry.	A bony fish of the family Dapediidae.	
Eomesodon?	E.? sp.	Single complete specimen	Úrkút quarry.	A bony fish of the family Pycnodontiformes.	
Leptolepis	L. normandica	More than 30 fishes	Úrkút quarry.; Épleny quarry	A bony fish of the family Leptolepididae.	

=== Fungi ===
Genus	Species	Material	Location	Notes	Images
Hyphae	H. sp	Hyphas	Úrkút quarry.; Épleny quarry	Incertade Sedis	
Ornatisporites	O. urkutensis	Spores	Úrkút quarry.; Épleny quarry	Incertade Sedis, probably Ophiostomatales.	

=== Palynology ===
Genus	Species	Material	Location	Notes	Images
Alisporites	A. inaequalis; A. thomasii; A. sp.	Pollen	Úrkút quarry.; Épleny quarry	Affinities with Corystospermales	
Bennettitaceaeacuminella	B. simplex	Pollen	Úrkút quarry.; Épleny quarry	Affinities with Bennettitales.	
Cerebropollenites	C. macroverrucosus	Pollen	Úrkút quarry.; Épleny quarry	Affinities with both Sciadopityaceae and Miroviaceae.	
Classopollis	C. torosus; C. classoides; C. grandis; C. minor	Pollen	Úrkút quarry.; Épleny quarry	Affinities with Cheirolepidiaceae.	
Clavatisporites	C. clarus; C. microcapitulus; C. minor; C. platycapitulus; C. pulcher	Spores	Úrkút quarry.; Épleny quarry	Incertade Sedis Pteridopsida.	
Concavisporites	C. polygonalis	Spores	Úrkút quarry.; Épleny quarry	Incertade Sedis Pteridopsida.	
Contignisporites	C. zolyomii	Spores	Úrkút quarry.; Épleny quarry	Incertade Sedis Pteridopsida.	
Corollina	C. meyeriana	Pollen	Úrkút quarry.; Épleny quarry	Affinities with Cheirolepidiaceae.	
Corrugatisporites	C. arcuatus	Spores	Úrkút quarry.; Épleny quarry	Incertade Sedis Pteridopsida.	
Crassosphaera	C. concinna	Cysts	Úrkút quarry.; Épleny quarry	Affinities with Prasinophyceae.	
Caytonipollenites	C. pallidus	Pollen	Úrkút quarry.; Épleny quarry	Affinities with Caytoniales.	
Cyathidites	C. minor; C. sp	Spores	Úrkút quarry.; Épleny quarry	Affinities with Cyatheales.	
Cycadopites	C. sp	Pollen	Úrkút quarry.; Épleny quarry	Affinities with Cycadales.	
Dictyophyllidites	D. crassiexinus; D. crassitorus; D. curvitorus; D. hungaricus; D. macrosinus; D. mortoni; D. rectitorus; D. reissingeri; D. transdanubicus	Spores	Úrkút quarry.; Épleny quarry	Affinities with Matoniaceae.	
Dictyotriletes	D. deaki; D. variegatus	Spores	Úrkút quarry.; Épleny quarry	Incertade Sedis	
Exesipollenites	E. scabrosus; E. tumulus	Spores	Úrkút quarry.; Épleny quarry	Affinities with Cheirolepidiaceae.	
Eucommiidites	E. troedssonii; E. rugulatus	Pollen	Úrkút quarry.; Épleny quarry	Affinities with Erdtmanithecales.	
Ginkgoretectina	G. ferrei; G. punctata; G. sp	Pollen	Úrkút quarry.; Épleny quarry	Affinities with Ginkgoaceae.	
Hamulatisporis	H. sp.A sp. nov.; H. sp.B sp. nov.	Spores	Úrkút quarry.; Épleny quarry	Affinities with Lycopodiaceae.	
Hystrichosphaeridium	H. sp.	Cysts	Úrkút quarry.; Épleny quarry	Affinities with Goniodomaceae (Dinophyceae).	
Inaperturopollenites	I. globulus; I. parvoglobulus	Pollen	Úrkút quarry.; Épleny quarry	Affinities with Pinidae or Cupressaceae.	
Klukisporites	K. deaki	Spores	Úrkút quarry.; Épleny quarry	Affinities with Schizaeaceae.	
Laevigatosporites	L. ovatus	Spores	Úrkút quarry.; Épleny quarry	Incertade Sedis Pteridopsida.	
Leiotriletes	L. brevilaesuratus; L. manganicus; L. pflugii; L. sphagnoides; L. transdanubicus; L. urkutensis	Spores	Úrkút quarry.; Épleny quarry	Incertade Sedis Pteridopsida.	
Lycopodiumsporites	L. clavatoides	Spores	Úrkút quarry.; Épleny quarry	Affinities with Lycopodiaceae.	
Marattisporites	M. scabratus	Spores	Úrkút quarry.; Épleny quarry	Affinities with Marattiaceae.	
Micrhystridium	M. arachnoides; M. recurvatum	Acritarchs	Úrkút quarry.; Épleny quarry	Probably related with Chloroplastida.	
Monocolpopollenites	M. sp.	Pollen	Úrkút quarry.; Épleny quarry	Either Ginkgoaceae or Cycadophyta	
Monosulcites	M. minimus; M. urkutiensis	Pollen	Úrkút quarry.; Épleny quarry	Affinities with Bennettitales, Ginkgoaceae or Cycadophyta.	
Obtusisporis	O. divisitorus; O. hexagonalis; O. kara-murzae; O. mesozoicus; O. reductus; O. undulus	Spores	Úrkút quarry.; Épleny quarry	Affinities with Lycopodiaceae.	
Paracirculina	P. tenebrosa	Pollen	Úrkút quarry.; Épleny quarry	Affinities with Bennettitales.	
Parvisaccites	P. enigmatus	Pollen	Úrkút quarry.; Épleny quarry	Affinities with Podocarpaceae.	
Perotrilites	P. pseudoreticulatus	Spores	Úrkút quarry.; Épleny quarry	Affinities with Selaginellaceae	
Pleurozonaria	P. concinna	Cysts	Úrkút quarry.; Épleny quarry	Affinities with Prasinophyceae.	
Pityosporites	P. illustris	Spores	Úrkút quarry.; Épleny quarry	Incertade Sedis Pteridopsida.	
Polycingulatisporites	P. circulus	Spores	Úrkút quarry.; Épleny quarry	Incertade Sedis Pteridopsida.	
Pteruchipollenites	P. thomasii	Pollen	Úrkút quarry.; Épleny quarry	Affinities with Umkomasiaceae.	
Punctatisporites	P. circulus; P. goczani; P. krutzschi; P. rotundus; P. sp.	Spores	Úrkút quarry.; Épleny quarry	Affinities with Lycopodiaceae.	
Sphagnumsporites	S. clavus; S. psilatus	Spores	Úrkút quarry.; Épleny quarry	Affinities with Sphagnaceae.	
Spheripollenites	S. scabratus; S. subgranulatus	Pollen	Úrkút quarry.; Épleny quarry	Affinities with Cheirolepidiaceae.	
Staplinisporites	S. hungaricus	Spores	Úrkút quarry.; Épleny quarry	Affinities with Bryophyta.	
Toroisporites	T. transdanubicus; T. (Toripunctisporis) hungaricus	Spores	Úrkút quarry.; Épleny quarry	Incertade Sedis Pteridopsida.	
Trilites	T. verrucatus; T. couperi; T. pulcher	Spores	Úrkút quarry.; Épleny quarry	Incertade Sedis Pteridopsida.	
Tricolporopollenites	T. cingulum	Pollen	Úrkút quarry.; Épleny quarry	Affinities with Caytoniales.	
Triplanosporites	T. couperi; T. goczani; T. manganicus	Spores	Úrkút quarry.; Épleny quarry	Incertade Sedis Pteridopsida.	
Tytthodiscus	T. mecsekensis	Cysts	Úrkút quarry.; Épleny quarry	Affinities with Prasinophyceae.	
Verrucosisporites	V. rarus	Spores	Úrkút quarry.; Épleny quarry	Incertade Sedis Pteridopsida.	
Undulatisporites	U. sp	Spores	Úrkút quarry.; Épleny quarry	Affinities with Schizaeaceae.	
Vitreisporites	V. craigii; V. pallidus	Spores	Úrkút quarry.; Épleny quarry	Affinities with Caytoniales.	

=== Fossil Wood ===
Genus	Species	Material	Location	Notes	Images
Agathoxylon	A. agathiforme; A. parenchymatosum; A. resiniferum; A. sp. 1; A. sp. 2; A.? sp. 3; A.? sp. 4; A.? sp. 5	Wood	Úrkút quarry.; Épleny quarry	Affinities with Araucariaceae or Cheirolepidiaceae.	
Callitrixylon	C. hungaricum	Wood	Úrkút quarry.; Épleny quarry	Affinities with Cupressaceae.	
Baieroxylon	B. lindicianum	Wood	Épleny quarry	Affinities with Ginkgoaceae.	
Podocarpoxylon	P.? sp.	Wood	Úrkút quarry.	Affinities with Podocarpaceae.	
Protelicoxylon	P. parenchymatosum	Wood	Úrkút quarry.	Affinities with Taxaceae.	
Prototaxodioxylon	P. sp.	Wood	Úrkút quarry.	Affinities with Taxaceae.	
Pteridospermaexylon	P. theresiae	Wood	Épleny quarry	Incertae sedis.	
Pseudagathoxylon	P. eplenyense	Wood	Úrkút quarry.; Épleny quarry	Affinities with Cheirolepidiaceae.	
Simplicioxylon	S. hungaricum	Wood	Úrkút quarry.; Épleny quarry	Affinities with Cheirolepidiaceae.	
Torreyoxylon	T. boureaui	Wood	Úrkút quarry.	Affinities with Araucariaceae.	
