= Eophyllites =

Eophyllites Temporal range: Early Triassic (Scythian)

Scientific classification
- Kingdom: Animalia
- Phylum: Mollusca
- Class: Cephalopoda
- Subclass: †Ammonoidea
- Order: †Ammonitida
- Family: †Ussuritidae
- Genus: †Eophyllites; Spath, 1930

Genus of molluscs (fossil)

Eophyllites is a genus of ammonoid cephalopods from the Lower Triassic and a predecessor of genera like Monophyllites and Ussurites.

The shell of Eophyllites is evolute, discoidal; whorls compressed, deeply embracing; flanks gently convex, converging on a narrowly rounded venter. Sutures basically ceratitic; ventral lobe wide, divided by a high siphonal saddle; Lobesjagged, 1st lateral larger than the second; saddles monophyllic, smooth and rounded.

Related Palaeophyllites from the same age is ribbed on the outer flanks and lobes in the suture are more terminally digitate.
