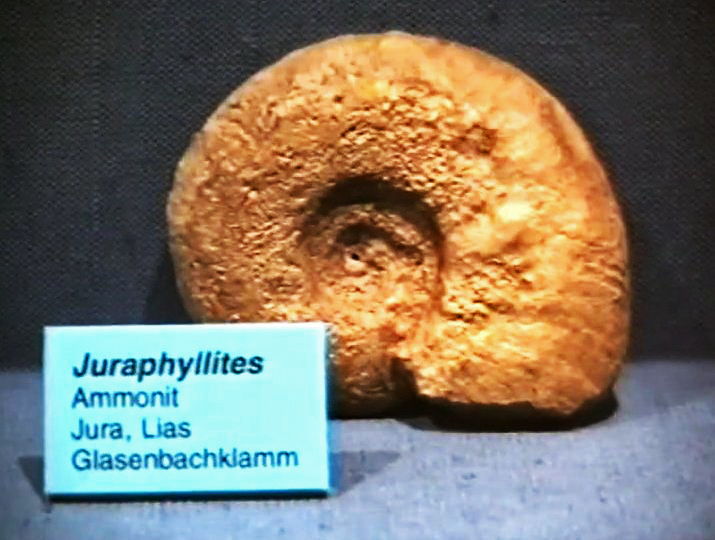

Scientific classification
- Domain: Eukaryota
- Kingdom: Animalia
- Phylum: Mollusca
- Class: Cephalopoda
- Subclass: †Ammonoidea
- Order: †Ammonitida
- Superfamily: †Phylloceratoidea
- Family: †Juraphyllitidae; Arkell, 1950

Genera
- See text

= Juraphyllitidae =

Juraphyllitidae Temporal range: Lower Jurassic

Extinct family of ammonites

Juraphyllitidae is a family of Lower Jurassic phylloceratin ammonites from Europe, North Africa, and Asia characterized by narrow, evolutely coiled shells, usually with coarse ventral ribbing on the body chamber. The first lateral saddles in the suture are diphyllic, with two terminal branches, others exposed sutural saddles are diphyllic or triphyllic, those covered by successive whorls being monophyllic. A few genera are more involute, with successive whorls partially embracing the flanks of the previous. All are compressed and a few lack ribbing.

The Juraphyllitidae are probably derived from the Late Triassic Discophyllitidae and independent from the Phylloceratidae. They apparently left no descendants.

Eight genera are included:

Juraphyllites
Tragophylloceras
Dasyceras
Schistophylloceras
Paradasyceras
Meneghiniceras
Harpophylloceras
Galaticeras

Distinctions are based on variations in overall form including nature of ribbing, ventral surface, and degree of involuteness.
