= Palaeophyllites =

Palaeophyllites Temporal range: Early Triassic (Scythian)

Scientific classification
- Kingdom: Animalia
- Phylum: Mollusca
- Class: Cephalopoda
- Subclass: †Ammonoidea
- Order: †Ammonitida
- Family: †Ussuritidae
- Genus: †Palaeophyllites; Welter, 1922

Genus of molluscs (fossil)

Palaeophyllites is a genus of ammonoids from the Lower Triassic and a contemporary of the related ussuritid Eophyllites.

The shell of Palaeophyllites is evolute, inner whorls generally smooth, outer whorl with irregular ribs. Sutures are basically ceratitic with digitate lobes and simple rounded monophyllic saddles. Paleophyllites differs from contemporary Eophyllites in having ribs on the outer part of the terminal whorl and lobes that are more quadrate in outline.

Like Eophyllites, Palaeophyllites is ancestral to genera like Ussurites and Monophyllites.
