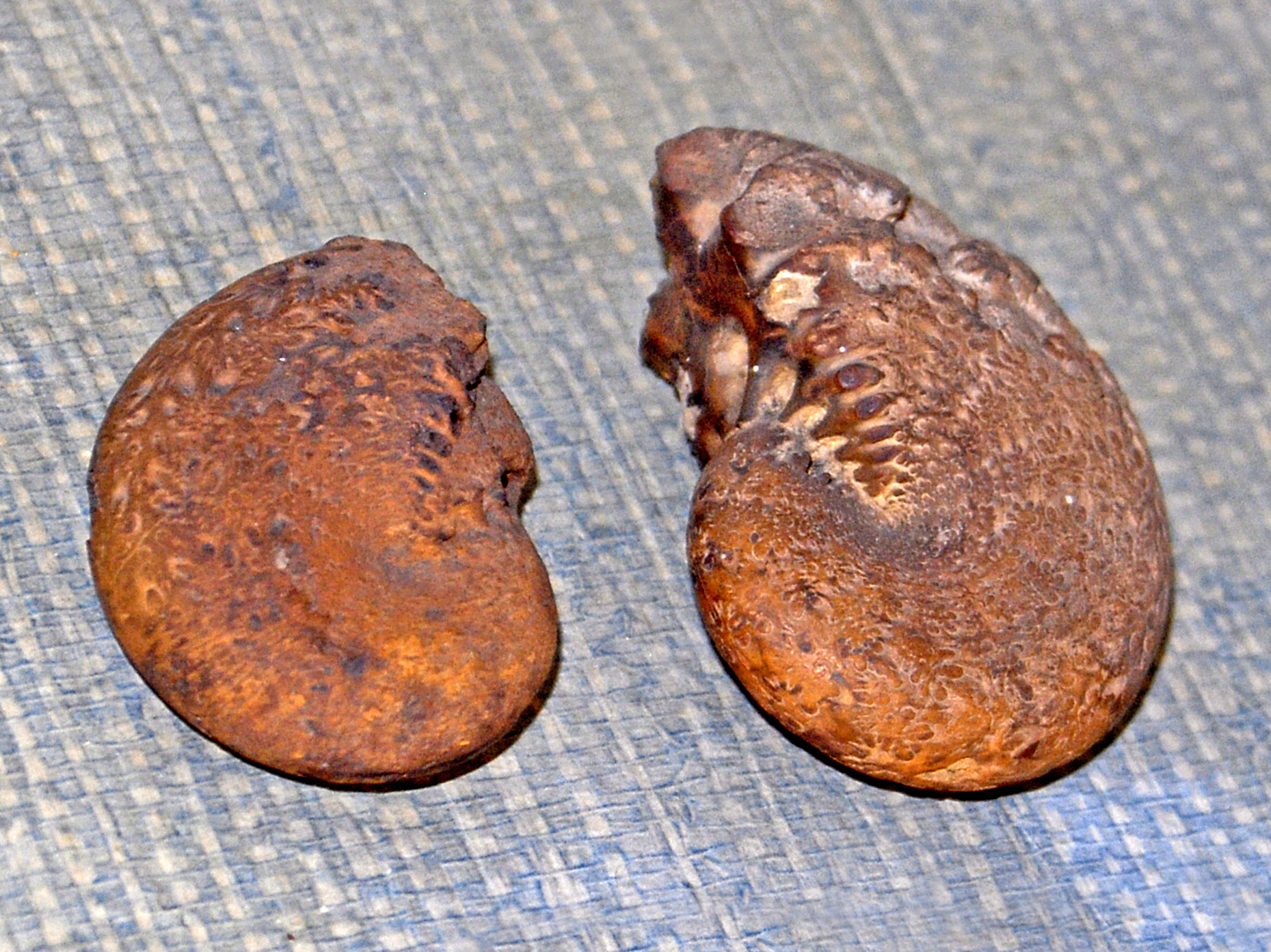
- Fossil shells of Phylloceras serum from Alpes-de-Haute-Provence, on display at Galerie de paléontologie et d'anatomie comparée in Paris

Scientific classification
- Kingdom: Animalia
- Phylum: Mollusca
- Class: Cephalopoda
- Subclass: †Ammonoidea
- Order: †Ammonitida
- Family: †Phylloceratidae
- Genus: †Phylloceras
- Species: †P. serum

Binomial name
- †Phylloceras serum Oppel 1865

= Phylloceras serum =

Phylloceras serum Temporal range: Early Jurassic–Late Cretaceous

Extinct species of mollusc

Phylloceras serum is an extinct species of ammonoid cephalopods belonging to the family Phylloceratidae. These nektonic carnivores lived from Early Jurassic to Late Cretaceous (from 150,8 to 125.45 Ma).

== Distribution ==
Fossils of species within this genus have been found in the Cretaceous of Austria, Mexico, Morocco, Poland, South Africa, Ukraine and in the Jurassic of Hungary and Italy.
