= Dasyceras =

Dasyceras Temporal range: Sinemurian

Scientific classification
- Kingdom: Animalia
- Phylum: Mollusca
- Class: Cephalopoda
- Subclass: †Ammonoidea
- Order: †Ammonitida
- Family: †Juraphyllitidae
- Genus: †Dasyceras; Hyatt, 1900

Species
- None cataloged

Genus of molluscs (fossil)

Dasyceras is an early phylloceratid from the Sinemurian stage of the lower Jurassic, found in Europe.

The shell is evolute, compressed in section. Inner whorls are smooth, outer mature whorl develops coarse falcoid ribs that arise near the umbilical rim but to not pass over the rounded venter.
