= Zetoceras =

Zetoceras Temporal range: Sinemurian–Bajocian

Scientific classification
- Kingdom: Animalia
- Phylum: Mollusca
- Class: Cephalopoda
- Subclass: †Ammonoidea
- Order: †Ammonitida
- Family: †Phylloceratidae
- Subfamily: †Phylloceratinae
- Genus: †Zetoceras; Kovacs, 1939

Extinct genus of molluscs

Zetoceras is an extinct ammonoid cephalopod genus from the suborder Phylloceratina that lived during the Early and Middle Jurassic in what is now Europe, and is included in the (family) Phylloceratidae.

Zetoceras has a compressed involute shell with a very small umbilicus. The suture is phylloid, as for the suborder, with tall primary sutural elements. Saddles commonly have tetraphyllic endings. Zetoceras is considered by some (Wright et al, 1996) to be a subgenus of Phylloceras. The two are very similar except that the saddle endings in Phylloceras split in three rather than in four as in Zetoceras.
