= Leiophyllites =

Scientific classification
- Kingdom: Animalia
- Phylum: Mollusca
- Class: Cephalopoda
- Subclass: †Ammonoidea
- Order: †Ammonitida
- Family: †Ussuritidae
- Genus: †Leiophyllites; Diener, 1915

Genus of molluscs (fossil)

Leiophyllites is a genus of early to middle Triassic ammonites belonging to the family Ussuritidae, possibly forming an evolutionary link between Lower Triassic and later members of the family.

The shell is evolute with a very slightly embracing whorls, ovoid in cross section. Sutures have digitate lobes and monophyllic saddles, most closely resembling those of Palaeophyllites except lobes are more flared at the ends and saddles are constricted at the base.
