= Ussurites =

Ussurites Temporal range: 245–237 Ma

Scientific classification
- Kingdom: Animalia
- Phylum: Mollusca
- Class: Cephalopoda
- Subclass: †Ammonoidea
- Order: †Ammonitida
- Family: †Ussuritidae
- Genus: †Ussurites; Hyatt, 1900

Extinct genus of molluscs

Ussurites is an extinct ammonoid cephalopod genus belonging to the suborder Phylloceratina and is included in the family Ussuritidae. Its range is restricted to the early Middle Triassic, (Anisian)

As with the family, the shell of Ussurites is discoidal, evolute, and generally smooth. The suture is phyletic with divided lobes and simple, rounded, elongate saddles. The ventral lobe is bifurcated, the two branches sharply serrated. The two lateral lobes are asymmetrically trifurcated, sections sharply pointed. The first lateral saddle (closest to the venter) is fairly evenly rounded, the second and third are narrower and asymmetric, leaning away from the venter and toward the umbilicus.

Monophyllites, which extends through the Middle Triassic into the Carnian is similar, differing in the details of the suture.
