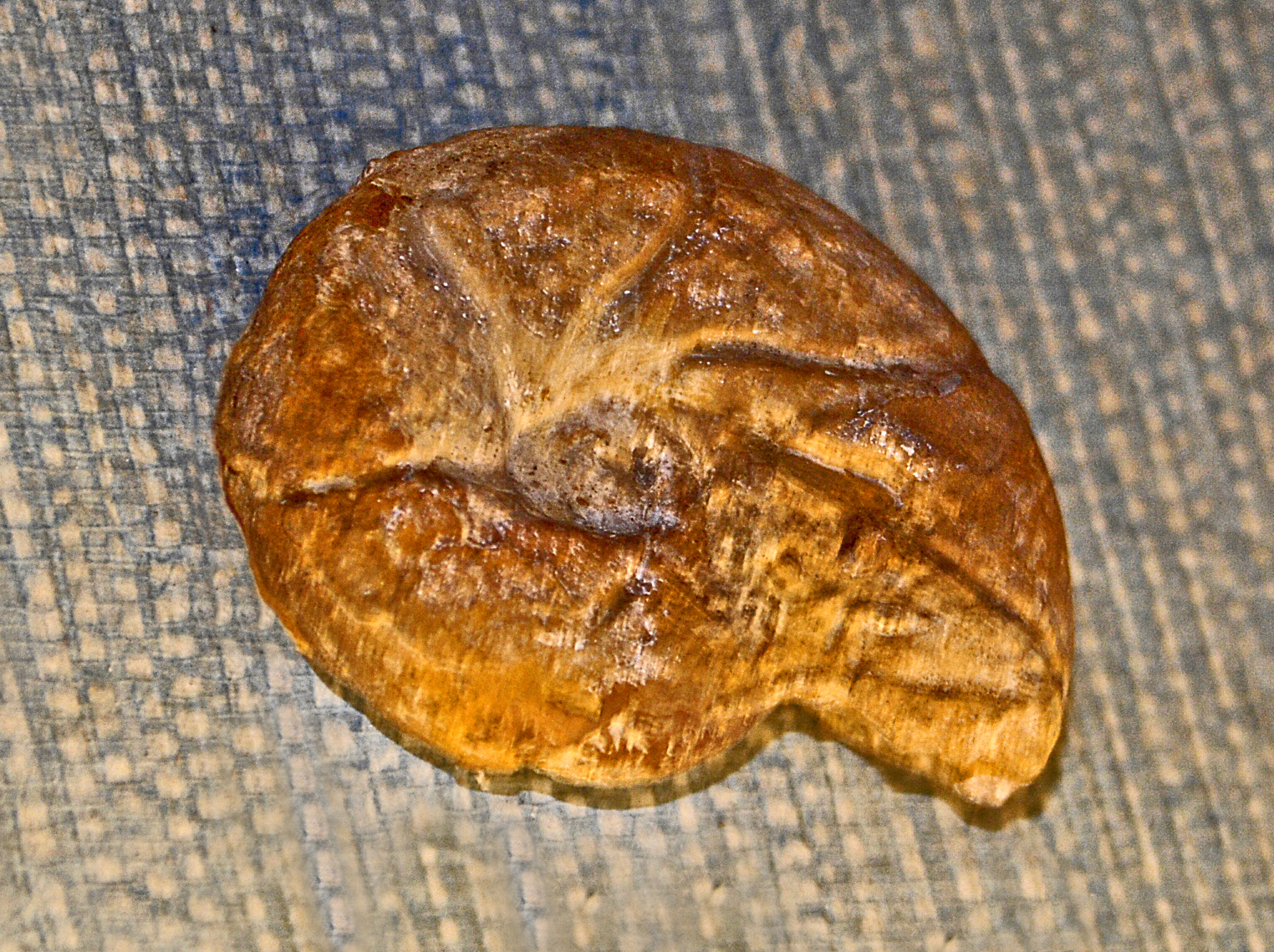
- Sowerbyceras tortisulcatum from Ardèche (France), on display at Galerie de paléontologie et d'anatomie comparée in Paris

Scientific classification
- Kingdom: Animalia
- Phylum: Mollusca
- Class: Cephalopoda
- Subclass: †Ammonoidea
- Order: †Ammonitida
- Family: †Phylloceratidae
- Subfamily: †Calliphylloceratinae
- Genus: †Sowerbyceras; Parona and Bonarelli 1895

Species
- S. tortisulcatus

= Sowerbyceras =

Sowerbyceras Temporal range: Oxfordian–Kimmeridgian

Genus of molluscs (fossil)

Sowerbyceras is a genus of ammonoid cephalopods belonging to the family Phylloceratidae. These nektonic carnivores lived during the Jurassic period, from Oxfordian to Kimmeridgian age.

== Description ==
Shells of Sowerbyceras can reach a diameter of about 6.3 centimetres (2.5 in). Form is evolute, smooth, moderately thick, with rather flattened flanks.

== Evolution of the genus Sowerbyceras ==
Sowerbyceras from the Kimmeridgian of Southern Alps (Northern Italy) show that the evolution of the Genus is strongly affected by fluctuations in sea level. In Southern Alps extinction and phyletic changes occur in transgressive phases instead of in regressive phases. Also the maxima and minima of intraspecific variability are the opposite to those of the epicontinental environment.

During times of high sea-level (transgressive phases = slight bottom currents) Sowerbyceras faunas decreased in numbers, and were smaller, with a lower thickness ratio Wb/D (whorl breadth/Diameter) and a more evolute conch. During times of low sea-level (regressive phases = higher bottom currents) there is an increase in frequency of Sowerbyceras, which were larger, with a greater t.r. Wb/D, and a more involute conch.

Morphological parameters D, Uw, wH, also vary with sea level. Sea-level lows (regressive phases) correspond to high intraspecific variability of D and lower intraspecific variability of Wb. Sea-level highs (trasgressive phases) correlate with lower intraspecific variability of D and higher intraspecific variability of Wb.

New species do not originate from a population that presents a wide range of intraspecific variability, but the speciation only occurs when this variability decreases and the population is also numerically reduced. A transgressive phase led to a numerically small population of Sowerbyceras that in turn resulted in low intraspecific variability and as a consequence speciation occurred.

This is of crucial importance for the survival of the species. In fact where, despite a low number of specimens, a high intraspecific variability is observed (at the top of the Beckeri-Pressulum Zone) Sowerbyceras became extinct in a short time. This observation is extremely important and assists the understanding of the process of extinction (From: "SARTI C. - 2003, Sea-level changes in the Kimmeridgian (Late Jurassic) and their effects on the phenotype evolution and dimorphism of the ammonite genus Sowerbyceras (Phylloceratina) and other ammonoid faunas from the distal pelagic swell area of the “Trento Plateau” (Southern Alps, Northern Italy): GeoActa, Vol.2, pp.115-144")

== Distribution ==
Fossils of species within this genus have been found in the Jurassic of Algeria, France, Italy, Madagascar and Spain.
