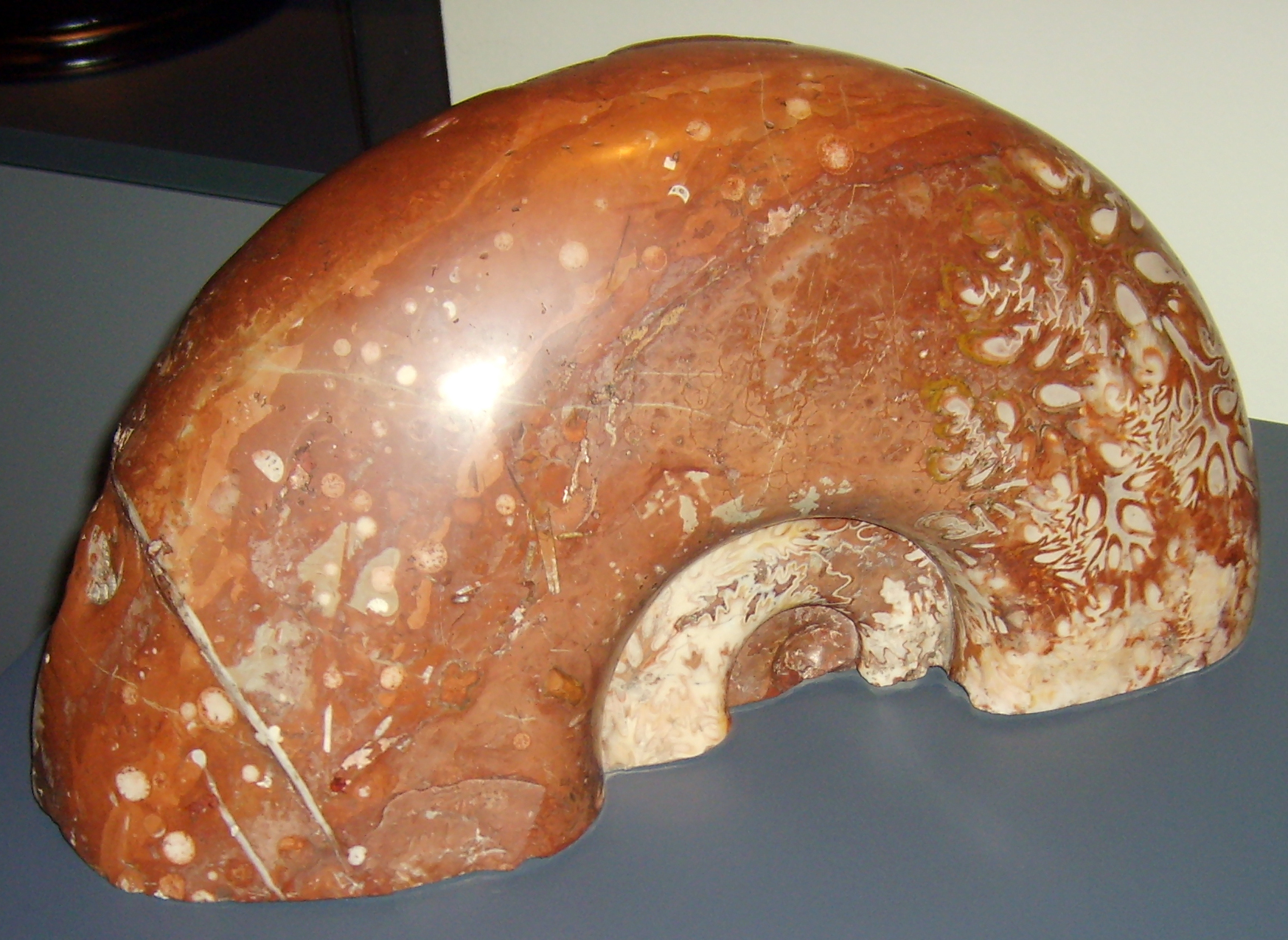
- Rhacophyllites neojurensis at the Museum für Naturkunde, Berlin

Scientific classification
- Domain: Eukaryota
- Kingdom: Animalia
- Phylum: Mollusca
- Class: Cephalopoda
- Subclass: †Ammonoidea
- Order: †Ammonitida
- Suborder: †Phylloceratina
- Family: †Discophyllitidae

Genera
- Discophyllites; Rhacophyllites; Tragorhacoceras

= Discophyllitidae =

Discophyllitidae Temporal range: 235.0–189.6 Ma

Extinct family of molluscs

Discophyllitidae are discoidal, generally evolute Phylloceratina from the Upper Triassic, derived from the Ussuritidae, in which the principal saddles of the suture have bifurcated or trifurcated endings, described as being di- or triphyllic. Discophyllitid shells are rather similar to those of the ancestral Ussuritidae and are distinguished primarily by the more complex suture. The Discophyllitidae provided the source for the Jurassic Phylloceratidae and Juraphyllitidae. Four genera are recognized and described.

== Discophyllitid genera ==
- Discophyllites: Discophyllitids in which the first lateral saddle of the suture is asymmetrically monophyllic, like those of the Ussuritidae. The remaining are characteristic of the family.
- Rhacophyllites: Discophyllitidae in which the first lateral saddle of the suture is diphyllic and adjacent lateral saddles are diphyllic or triphillic.
- Tragorhacoceras: Discophyllitidae with peripheral ribs on the outer whorl and with large leaflets in the sutural saddles.
- Trachyphyllites: a discophyllitid with sigmoidal growth lines and about six ribs or flares per whorl; suture less phylloid than in other genera of the family.

Discophyllites and Rhacophyllites have their beginnings in the early Late Triassic. Both are found in Europe, the Himalayas, and on Timur; Discophyllites in California and Alaska as well. Discophyllites is the more primitive and ancestral genus. Rhacophyllites is slightly more evolved with its more developed suture.

Tragorhacoceras and Trachyphyllites are known from the middle Late Triassic, Tragorhacoceras from the Alps and Sicily, Trachyphyllites from the island of Timur. Both result from further, but different, evolutionary developments within the Discophyllitidae.
