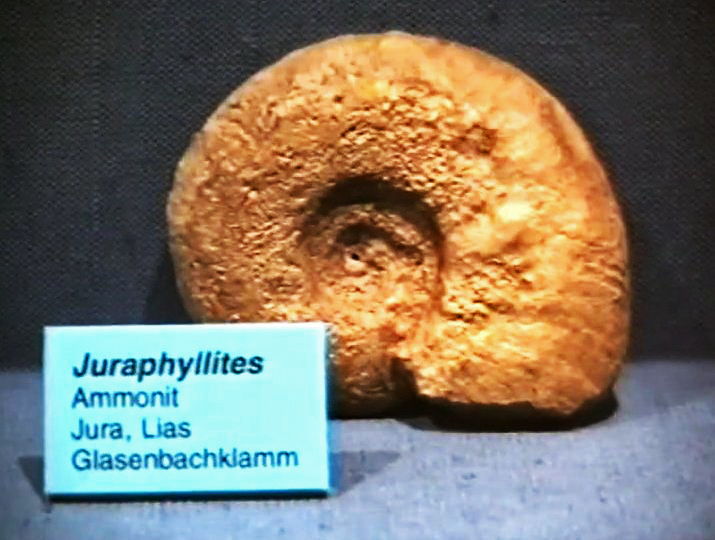
- Fossil of Juraphyllites.at Haus der Natur, Salzburg

Scientific classification
- Domain: Eukaryota
- Kingdom: Animalia
- Phylum: Mollusca
- Class: Cephalopoda
- Subclass: †Ammonoidea
- Order: †Ammonitida
- Family: †Juraphyllitidae
- Genus: †Juraphyllites; Muller, 1939

= Juraphyllites =

Juraphyllites Temporal range: Jurassic

Genus of ammonites

Juraphyllites is a genus of ammonites belonging to the family Juraphyllitidae.

== Fossil record ==
These ammonites lived in the Jurassic from Sinemurian to Toarcian (age range: 196.5 to 182.0 million years ago). Fossils of this genus can be found in Argentina, Austria, Canada, Chile, China, France, Germany, Hungary, Italy, Morocco, Portugal, Slovakia, Spain, Tunisia, Turkey and United States.

== Species ==
Species within this genus include:

- Juraphyllites (Harpophylloceras) eximius Hauer 1854
- Juraphyllites (Meneghiniceras) lariense Meneghini 1875
- Juraphyllites diopsis Gemmellaro 1884
- Juraphyllites gigas Fucini 1901
- Juraphyllites helveticus Wiedenmayer 1977
- Juraphyllites libertus Gemmellaro 1884
- Juraphyllites libertus australis Hillebrandt 2006
- Juraphyllites limatus Rosenberg 1909
- Juraphyllites mimatensis d'Orbigny 1844
- Juraphyllites nardii Meneghini 1853
- Juraphyllites planispira Reynes 1868
- Juraphyllites planispiroides Rakus 1994
- Juraphyllites separabilis Fucini 1901

== See also ==
- List of ammonite genera
