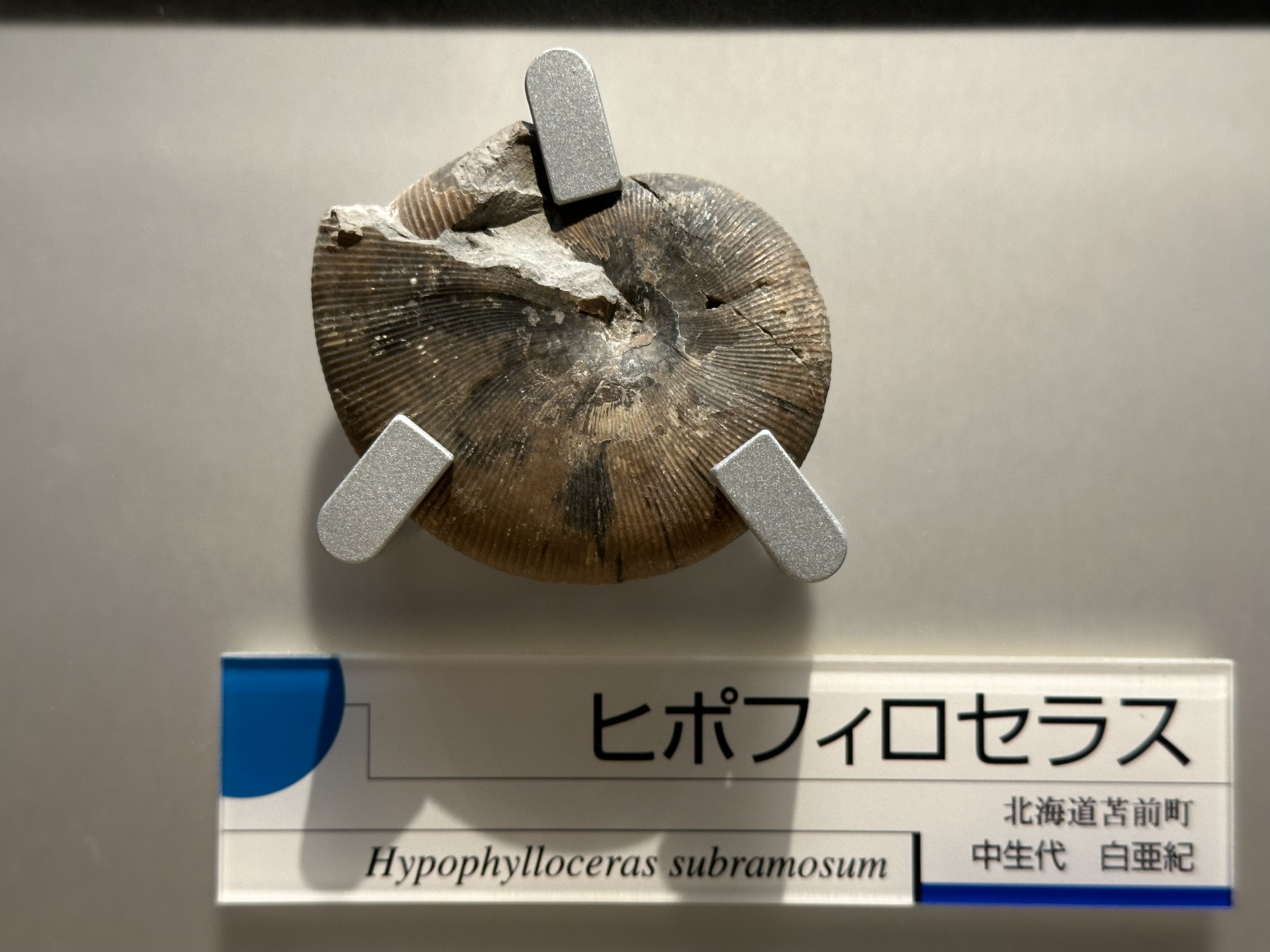
- A fossil of Hypophylloceras subramosum in Toyohashi Museum of Natural History

Scientific classification
- Kingdom: Animalia
- Phylum: Mollusca
- Class: Cephalopoda
- Subclass: †Ammonoidea
- Order: †Ammonitida
- Family: †Phylloceratidae
- Subfamily: †Phylloceratinae
- Genus: †Hypophylloceras; Salfeld, 1924

= Hypophylloceras =

Hypophylloceras Temporal range: Valanginian–Maastrichtian

Extinct genus of ammonites

Hypophylloceras is a Cretaceous ammonite with a finely ribbed, compressed, involute shell; some having periodic stronger ribs or folds. The suture is complex, with large, asymmetric and finely divided lobes; the 1st lateral being much larger than the external (=ventral) and 2nd lateral lobes. Saddle endings commonly not phylloid.

Hypophylloceras includes Neophylloceras Shimizu 1934 (=Paraphylloceras Chimisu 1935 ), Hyporbulites Brestroffer 1947, Goretophylloceras Collingnon 1949 and Aphrotiticeras Mahmoud in Breister, 1952.

The type species Hypophylloceras ononense, named by Salfeld in 1924 and based on Phylloceras ononense Santon 1895, comes from the Aptian of California.
