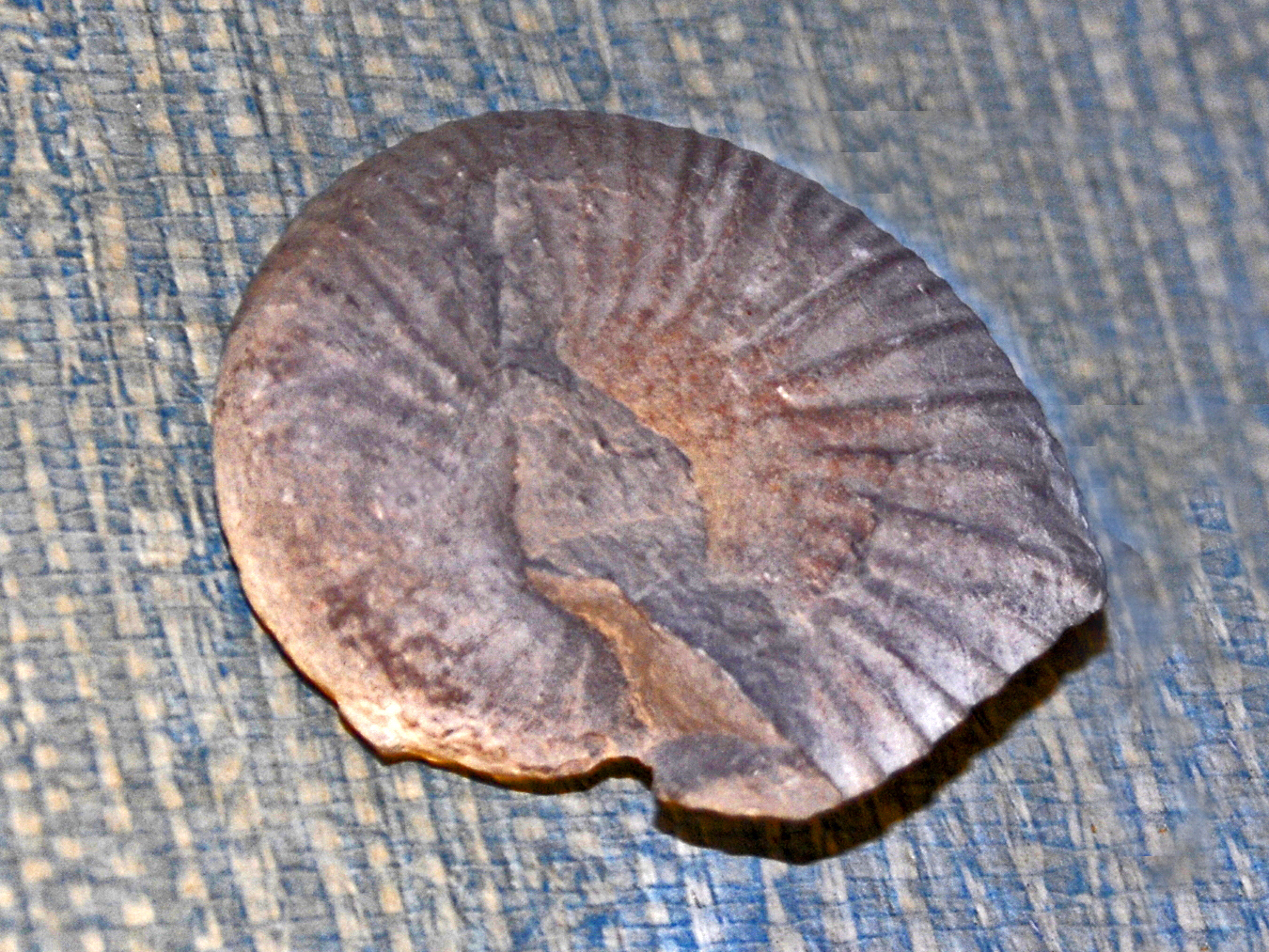
- Fossil shells of Phyllopachyceras infundibulum from Alpes-de-Haute-Provence, on display at Galerie de paléontologie et d'anatomie comparée in Paris

Scientific classification
- Kingdom: Animalia
- Phylum: Mollusca
- Class: Cephalopoda
- Subclass: †Ammonoidea
- Order: †Ammonitida
- Family: †Phylloceratidae
- Subfamily: †Phylloceratinae
- Genus: †Phyllopachyceras; Spath, 1925

= Phyllopachyceras =

Phyllopachyceras Temporal range: Cretaceous, 145.5–70.6 Ma

Extinct genus of molluscs

Phyllopachyceras is an extinct genus of ammonoid cephalopods belonging to the family Phylloceratidae. These nektonic carnivores lived in the Cretaceous, from Hauterivian to Maastrichtian to age.

== Species ==
- Phyllopachyceras chitianum Imlay, 1960
- Phyllopachyceras infundibulum d'Orbigny, 1841
- Phyllopachyceras reymenti Riccardi, 2018
- Phyllopachyceras trinitense Anderson, 1938
- Phyllopachyceras umpuanum Anderson, 1938

== Description ==
Shells of Phyllopachyceras can reach a diameter of about 4.5 centimetres (1.8 in). On the external surface ribs are alternately short and long and sutures show a high complexity, with saddle endings perfectly quadruple (tetraphillic). The section of the shell is quite thick.

== Distribution ==
Fossils of species within this genus have been found in the Cretaceous of Antarctica, Argentina, Austria, China, France, Hungary, Italy, Japan, Madagascar, New Zealand, Poland, Russia, Spain, Ukraine and United States.
