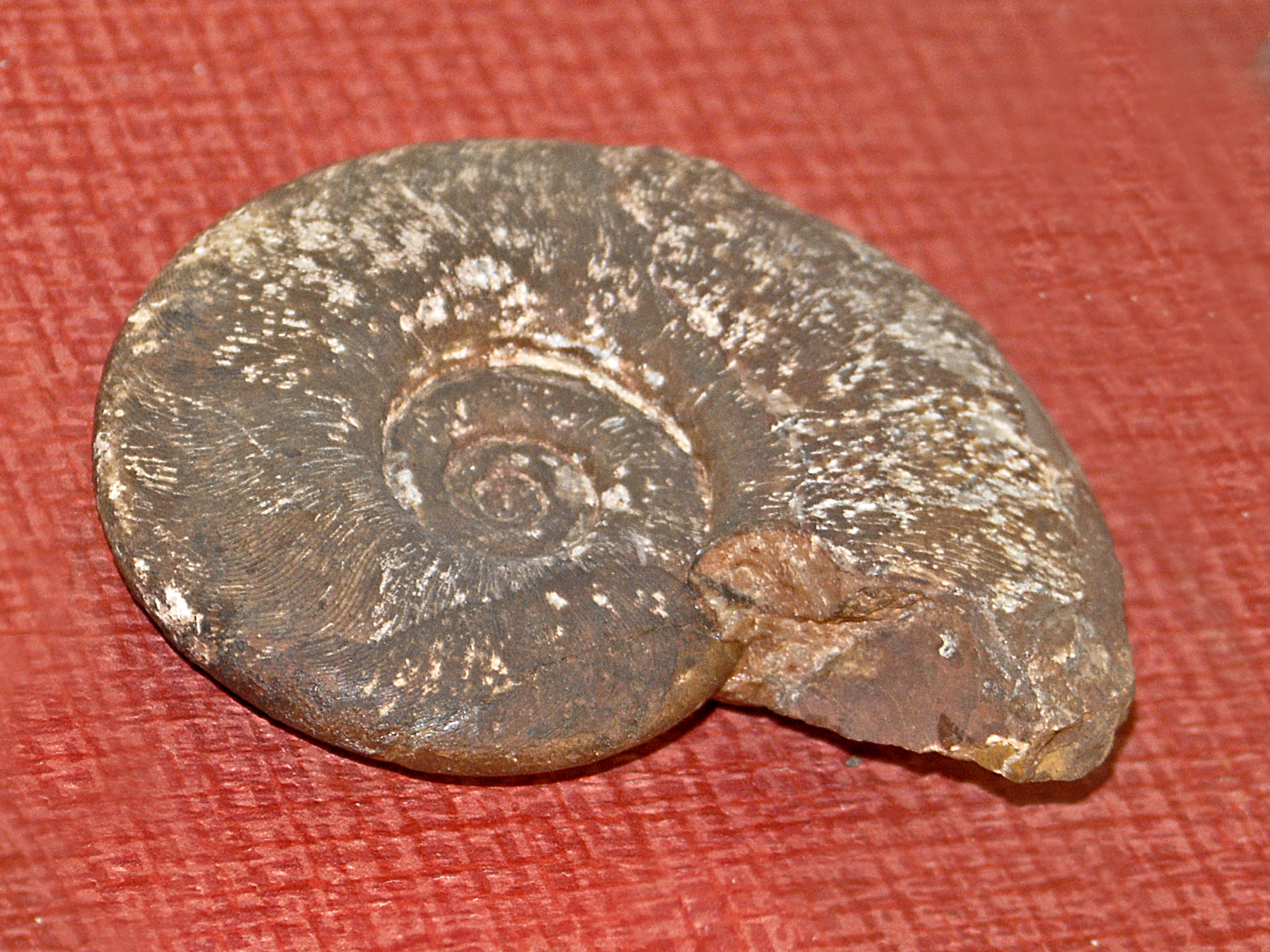
- Rhacophyllites debilis from Austria, on display at Galerie de paléontologie et d'anatomie comparée in Paris

Scientific classification
- Kingdom: Animalia
- Phylum: Mollusca
- Class: Cephalopoda
- Subclass: †Ammonoidea
- Order: †Ammonitida
- Family: †Discophyllitidae
- Genus: †Rhacophyllites; Zittel, 1884

= Rhacophyllites =

Rhacophyllites Temporal range: Upper Triassic, 217–212 Ma

Genus of molluscs (fossil)

Rhacophyllites is an extinct genus of cephalopods belonging to the family Discophyllitidae. These nektonic carnivores lived during the Triassic period, from Carnian to Rhaetian age.

== Species ==
- Rhacophyllites debilis Hauer, 1846
- Rhacophyllites kavasensis Kovacs, 1942

== Description ==
Rhacophyllites can reach a maximum diameter of about 120 millimetres (4.7 in). They have a discoidal, generally evolute shell. The first lateral saddle of the suture is diphyllic and adjacent lateral saddles are diphyllic or triphillic.
