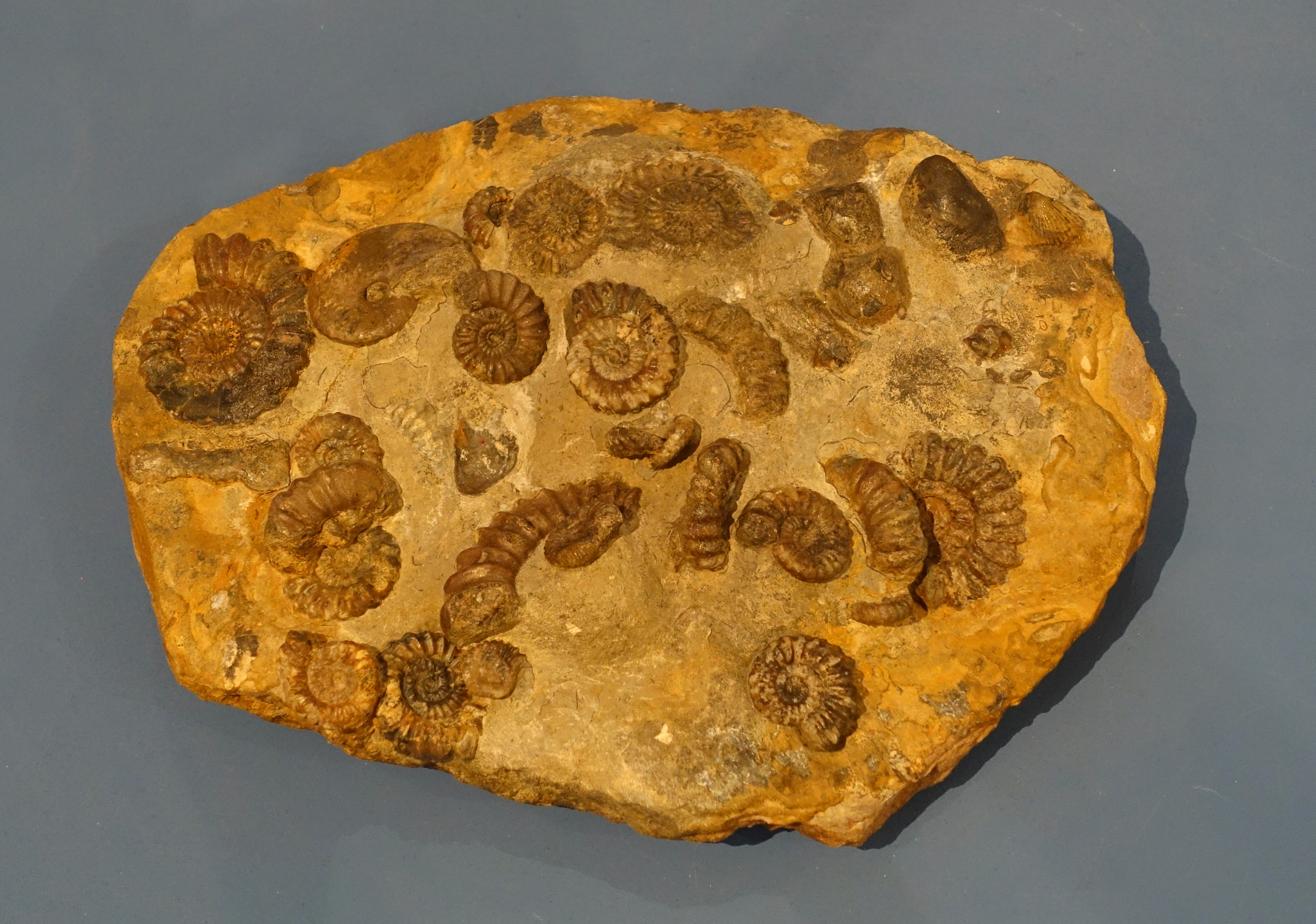
- Tragophylloceras numismale and Androgynoceras lataecosta

Scientific classification
- Domain: Eukaryota
- Kingdom: Animalia
- Phylum: Mollusca
- Class: Cephalopoda
- Subclass: †Ammonoidea
- Order: †Ammonitida
- Family: †Juraphyllitidae
- Genus: †Tragophylloceras; Hyatt in Eastman-Zittel, 1900

Species
- T. alloeotypus; T. carinatum; T. ibex; T. loscombi; T. numismale; T. undulatum

= Tragophylloceras =

Tragophylloceras Temporal range: Pliensbachian

Genus of molluscs (fossil)

Tragophylloceras is an extinct genus of cephalopod belonging to the Ammonite subclass.

== Distribution ==
Jurassic of Austria, France, Germany, Serbia and Montenegro, Spain, Switzerland, Poland and the United Kingdom.
