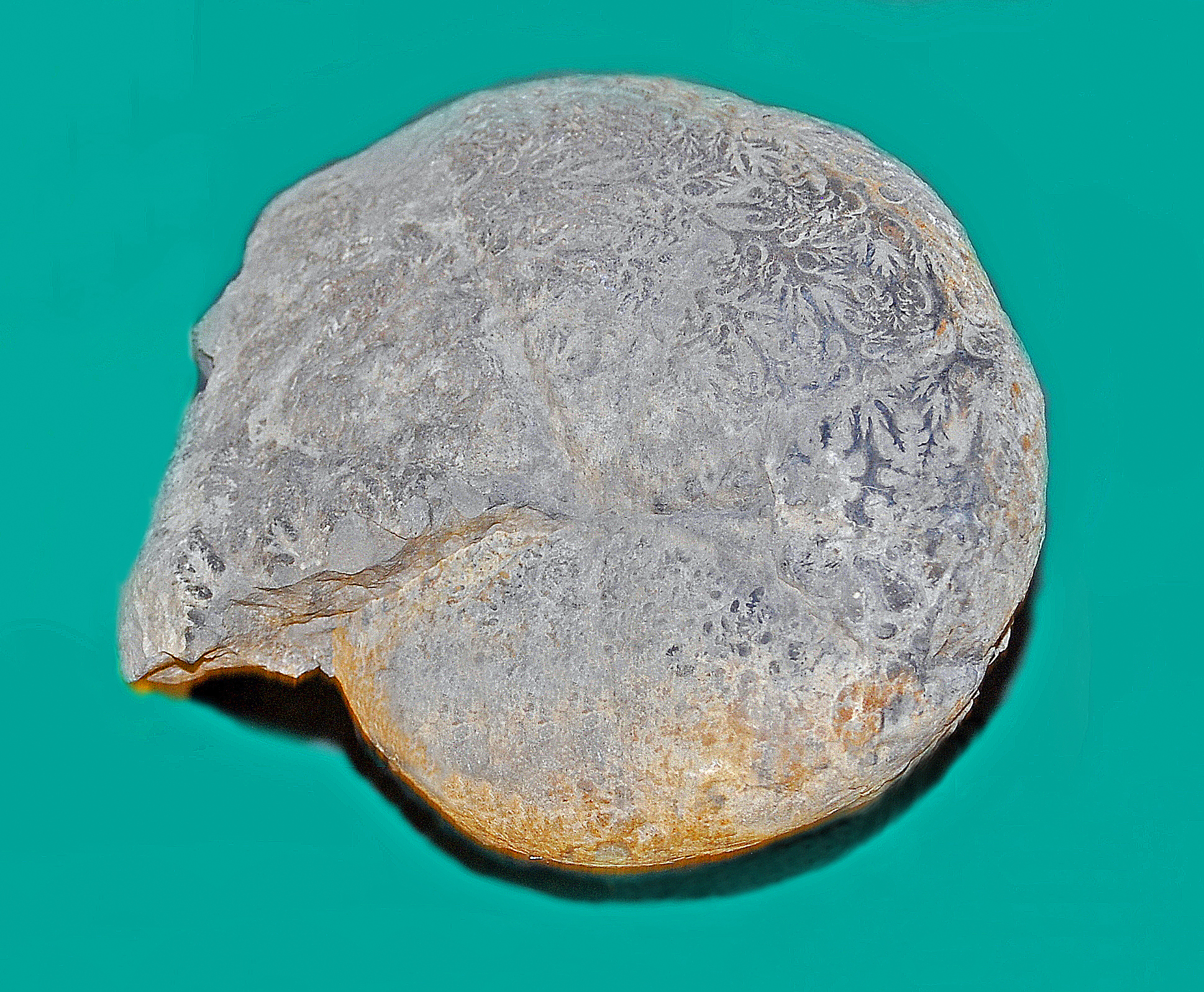
- Fossil of Calliphylloceras disputabile from Chaudon (France) (abt 175 ma)

Scientific classification
- Domain: Eukaryota
- Kingdom: Animalia
- Phylum: Mollusca
- Class: Cephalopoda
- Subclass: †Ammonoidea
- Order: †Ammonitida
- Family: †Phylloceratidae
- Subfamily: †Calliphylloceratinae
- Genus: †Calliphylloceras; Spath, 1927

Type species
- Calliphylloceras disputabile Spath, 1927

= Calliphylloceras =

Calliphylloceras Temporal range: Hettangian–Albian

Genus of ammonites

Calliphylloceras is an ammonite belonging to the Phylloceratidae.

== Species ==
Species within this genus include:

- Calliphylloceras alontinum (Gemmellaro, 1884)
- Calliphylloceras bicicolae
- Calliphylloceras capitanii
- Calliphylloceras demidoffi (Rousseau, 1842)
- Calliphylloceras disputabile (type) Spath, 1927
- Calliphylloceras freibrocki Imlay, 1953
- Calliphylloceras kochi (Oppel, 1865)
- Calliphylloceras nilssoni
- Calliphylloceras nizinanum
- Calliphylloceras propinquum
- Calliphylloceras seroplicatum
- Calliphylloceras spadae
- Calliphylloceras supraliasicum

The holotype of C disputabile, the type species, named by Spath in 1927, which came from the Middle Jurassic of Hungary, is based on Phylloceras disputabile Zittil. Neocalliphylloceras Bresairie 1936, Captianioceras Kuvacs 1939 and Euphylloceras Draughtchitz 1953 are equivalent genera.

== Description ==
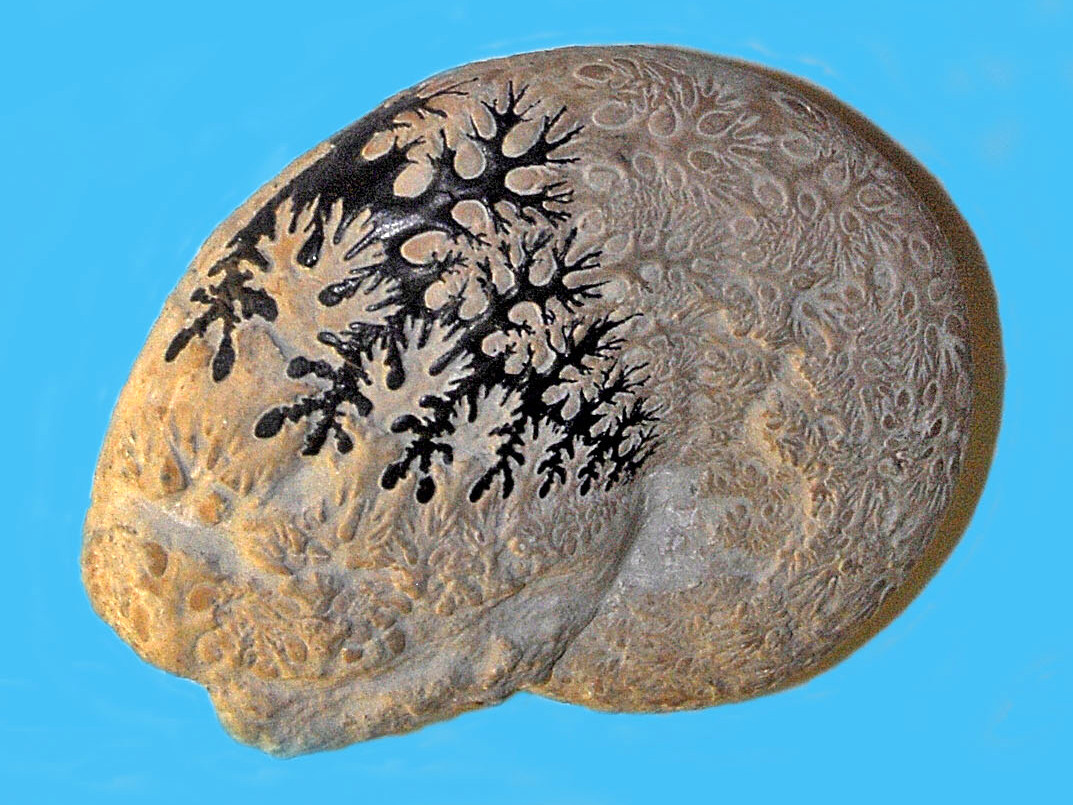
Fossil shell of Calliphylloceras spadae. Museum specimen

Calliphylloceras has a smooth, compressed involute shell with a rounded venter and periodic constrictions in the internal mold; surface covered with lirae as in Phylloceras. The first and 2nd lateral saddles are usually triphyllic, others diphyllic.

== Distribution ==
This species has been found in the Cretaceous of Bulgaria, Canada, France, Japan, United States and in the Jurassic of Argentina, Austria, Germany, Hungary, India, Iran, Italy, Japan, Madagascar, the Russian Federation, Spain, Turkey, United States

== Bibliography ==
- Imlay 1960. Early Cretaceous (albian) Ammonites from the Chitina Valley and Talkeetna Mountains, Alaska. US Geological Survey PP 354-D
