= Úrkút =

- Flag Coat of arms

- Location of Veszprém county in Hungary

- Location of Úrkút
- Coordinates: 47°04′55″N 17°38′40″E
- Country: Hungary
- County: Veszprém

Area
  - Total: 20.13 km^{2} (7.77 sq mi)

Population (2004)
  - Total: 2,216
  - Density: 110.08/km^{2} (285.1/sq mi)
- Time zone: UTC+1 (CET)
  - Summer (DST): UTC+2 (CEST)
- Postal code: 8409
- Area code: 88

Úrkút is a village in Veszprém county, Hungary.

South of Úrkút, there is the 238 metres tall Kabhegy TV Mast, the fourth tallest radio tower in Hungary.
