= Eplény =

- Coat of arms

- Location of Eplény in Hungary
- Coordinates: 47.2058°N 17.921°E
- Country: Hungary
- Region: Central Transdanubia
- County: Veszprém

Area
  - Total: 8.28 km^{2} (3.20 sq mi)

Population (2012)
  - Total: 523
  - Density: 63.2/km^{2} (164/sq mi)
- Time zone: UTC+1 (CET)
  - Summer (DST): UTC+2 (CEST)
- Postal code: 8413
- Area code: +36 88
- Website: https://epleny.hu/

Eplény is a village in Veszprém county, Hungary.
