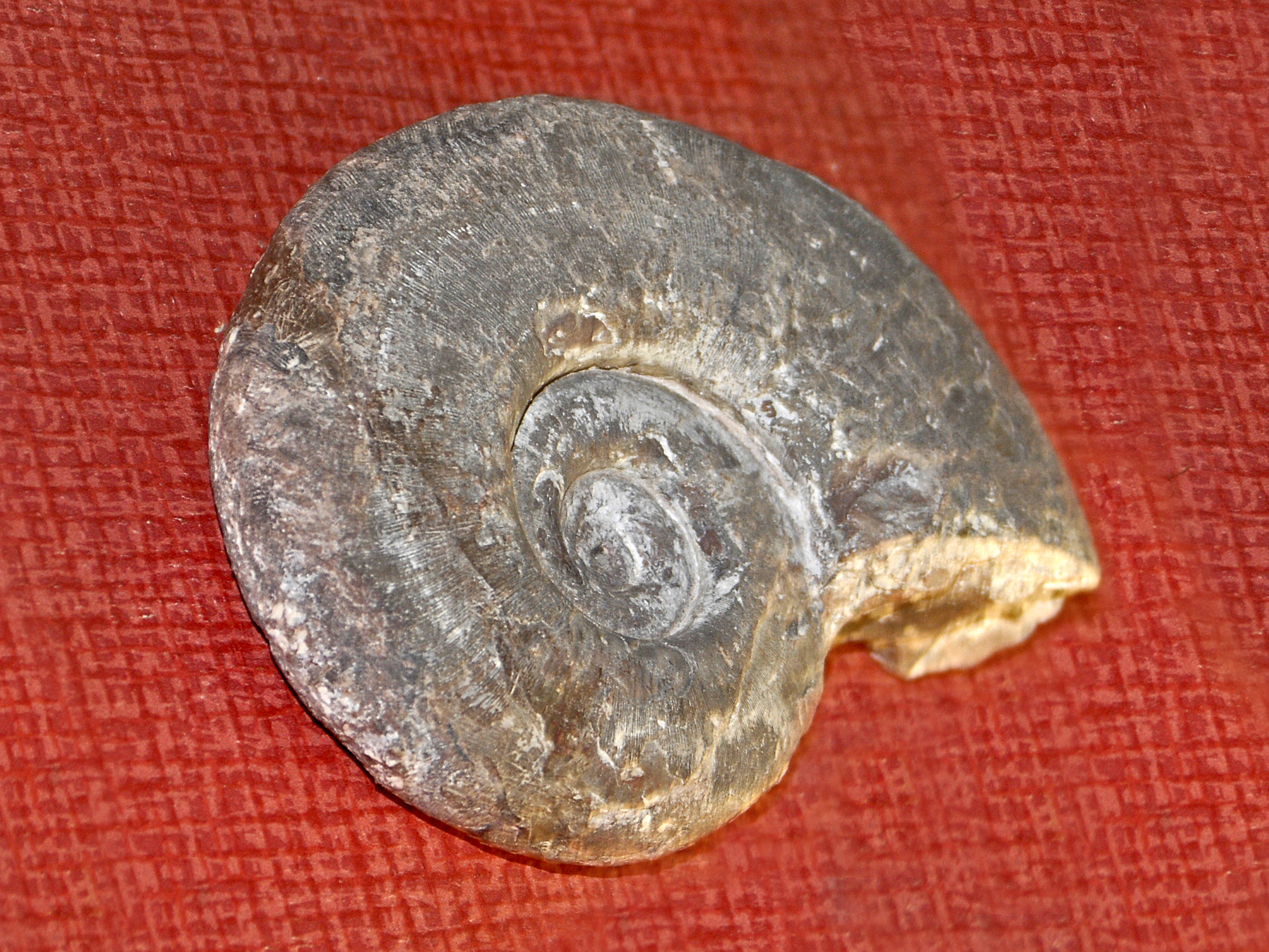
- Fossil of Monophyllites sphaerophyllus from Bosnia, on display at Galerie de paléontologie et d'anatomie comparée in Paris

Scientific classification
- Kingdom: Animalia
- Phylum: Mollusca
- Class: Cephalopoda
- Subclass: †Ammonoidea
- Order: †Ammonitida
- Suborder: †Phylloceratina
- Family: †Ussuritidae; Hyatt, 1900

= Ussuritidae =

Ussuritidae Temporal range: Triassic

Extinct family of molluscs

Ussuritidae are ancestral, Triassic, Phylloceratina characterized by generally smooth, discoidal, evolute shells with rounded venters and little or no ornamentation and by sutures with primitive monophyllitic saddles with a single terminal branch or leaflet.

The Ussuritidae are most likely derived from the Dieneroceratidae and give rise to the Discophyllitidae. Seven genera are included:

- Ussurites
- Palaeophyllites
- Monophyllites
- Majsvarites
- Leiophyllites
- Eopsiloceras
- Eophyllites

Genera are distinguished on the basis of shell morphology and characteristics of the suture.

Ussuritidae are also known as the Monophyllitidae, a junior synonym. Palaeophyllitidae, for Palaeophyllites, is sometimes found in the literature.
