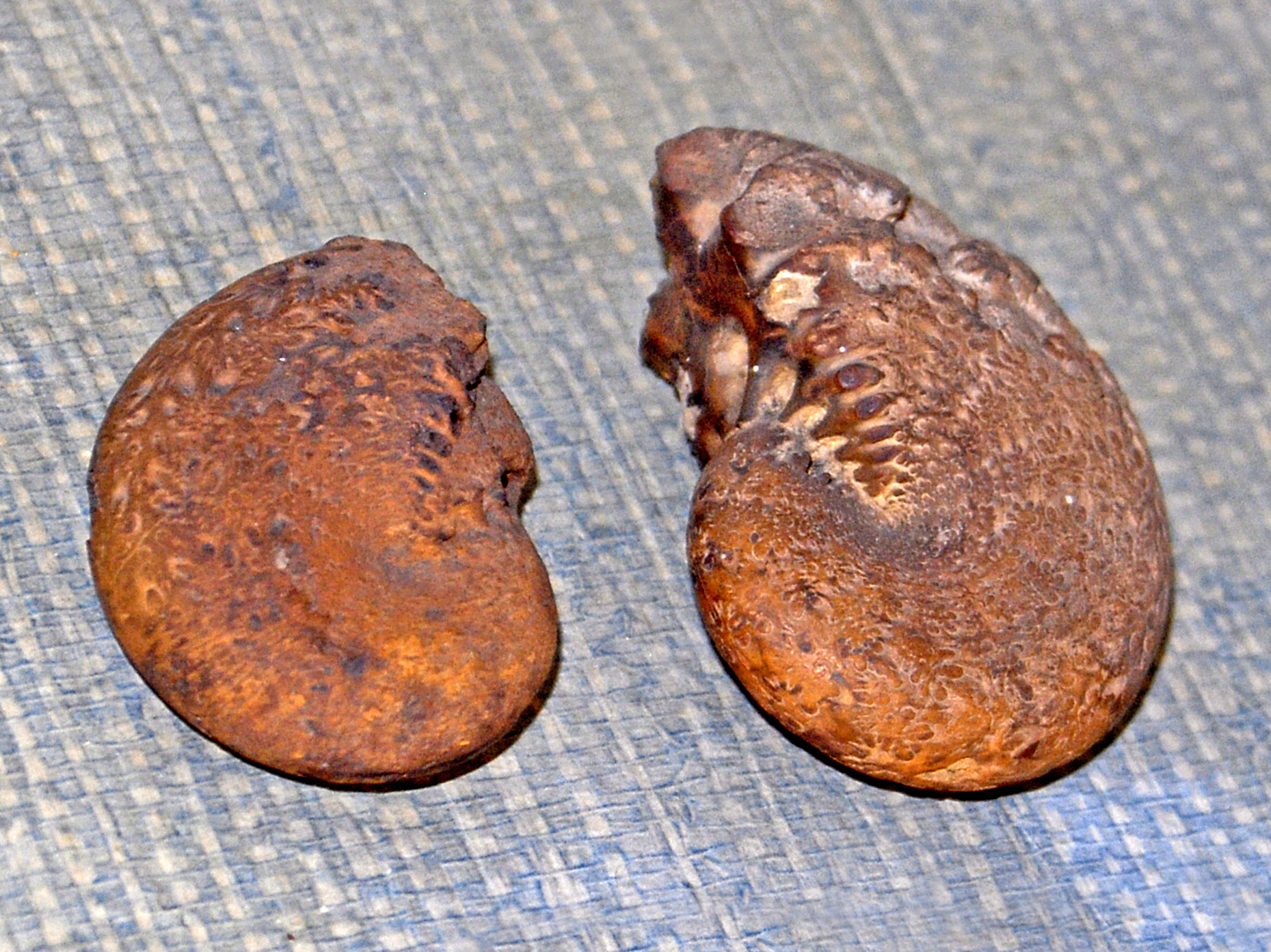
- Fossil shells of Phylloceras serum from Southern Alps, on display at Galerie de paléontologie et d'anatomie comparée in Paris

Scientific classification
- Domain: Eukaryota
- Kingdom: Animalia
- Phylum: Mollusca
- Class: Cephalopoda
- Subclass: †Ammonoidea
- Order: †Ammonitida
- Superfamily: †Phylloceratoidea
- Family: †Phylloceratidae; Zittel, 1884

Subfamilies
- Calliphylloceratinae; Phylloceratinae

= Phylloceratidae =

Phylloceratidae Temporal range: Lower Jurassic–Upper Cretaceous

Extinct family of molluscs

Phylloceratidae is the predominant family of the Phylloceratina with some 15 or more genera found in rocks ranging from the Lower Jurassic to the Upper Cretaceous. Members of the Phylloceratidae are characterized by smooth, involute shells with very thin walls. Many are covered with fine growth lines but are usually without ribbing. Sutures are complex with the major and minor branches of the saddles with phylloid or spatulate endings.

== Evolution and phylogeny ==
The Phylloceratidae are probably derived from the Late Triassic Discophyllitidae by increasing the sutural complexity and evolving involute coiling. The Discophyllitidae in turn have their origin in the Ussuritidae, also known as the Monophyllitidae.

The Phylloceratidae gave rise at or near the beginning of the Jurassic to the ancestral Lytoceratina, the early Lower Jurassic Peluroacanthitidae and Ectocentridae. The Phyloceratidae also gave rise at or near the beginning of the Jurassic to the Psiloceratoidea which unites families of the Early Jurassic Ammonitina. Other Jurassic Ammonitina are derived from the Lytoceratina. Later, phylloceratids are said to have given rise to Cretaceous Ammonitina included in the Desmoceratoidea, Hoplitoidea, and Acanthoceratoidea.

== Sutural morphology ==
Sutures in the Phylloceratidae vary in complexity and are usually described on the basis of the saddles, which diverge to the front. Saddle endings may be double (diphyllic), triple (triphyllic), or quadruple (tetraphillic). Branching may be asymmetric. Intervening lobes are variably branched with thornlike or spinose terminations as viewed in plan.

== Subfamilies and genera ==
- Calliphylloceratinae Spath, 1927
  - Calliphylloceras Spath, 1927
  - Holcophylloceras Spath, 1927
  - Ptychophylloceras Spath, 1927
  - Sowerbyceras Parona & Bonarelli, 1895
- Phylloceratinae Zittel, 1884
  - Calaiceras
  - Carinophylloceras Klinger et al., 1975
  - Hantkeniceras
  - Hypophylloceras (Salfeld, 1924)
  - Partschiceras Fucini, 1920
  - Phylloceras Suess, 1865
  - Phyllopachyceras Spath, 1925
  - Zetoceras Kovacs, 1939
- incertae sedis
  - Bonarellia
