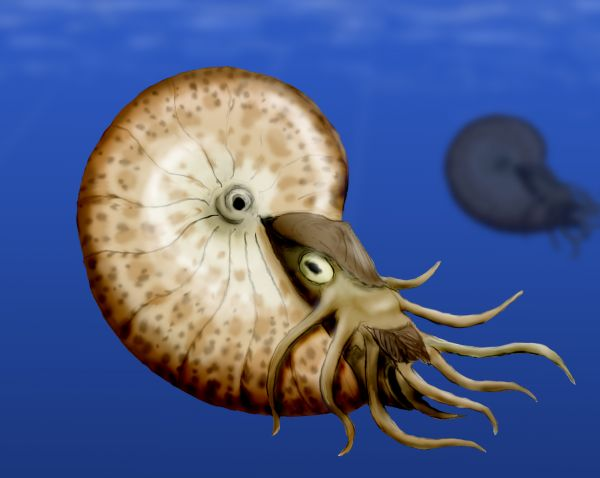
- Artist's reconstruction
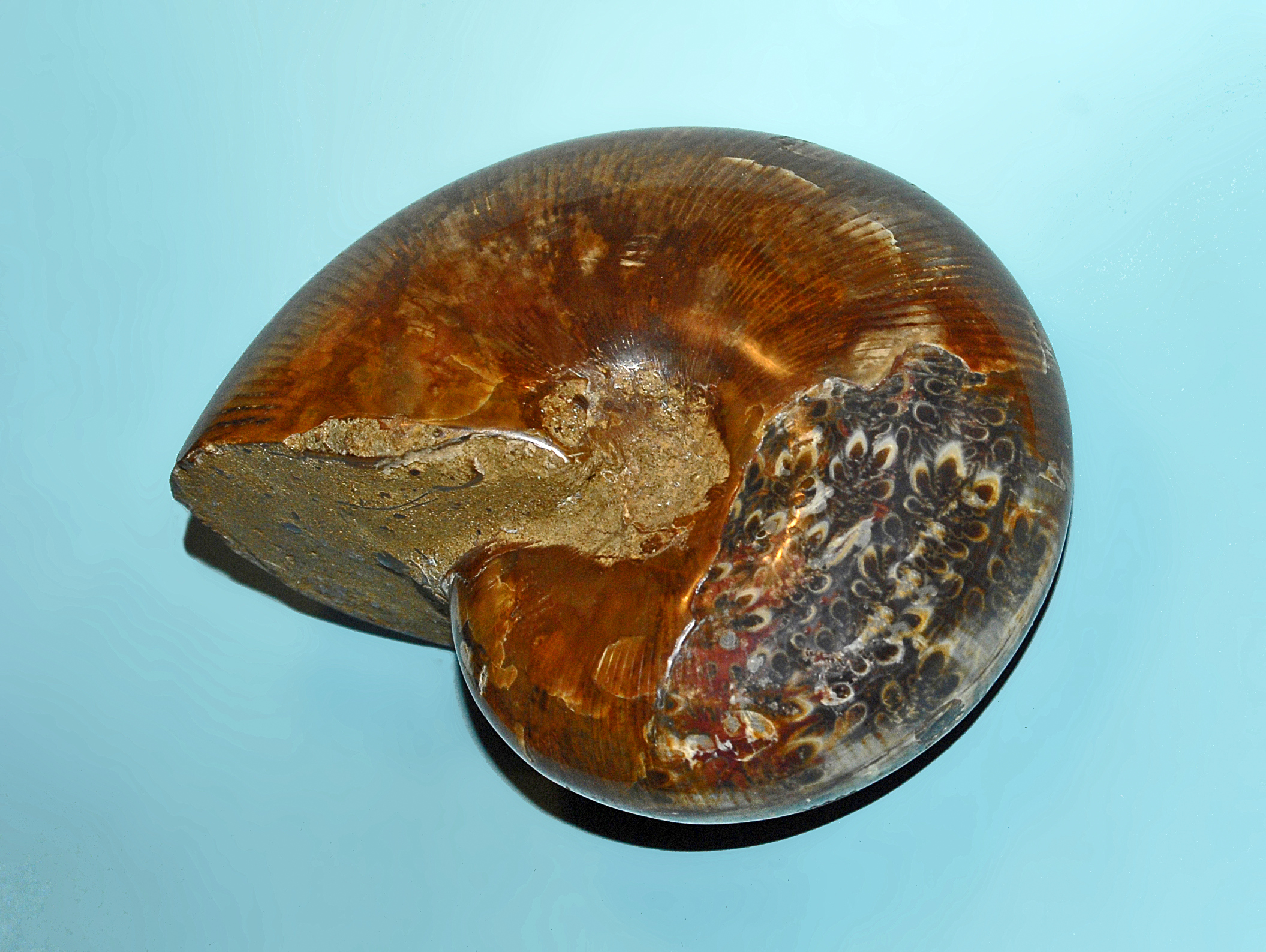
- Fossil shell of Phylloceras species, part removed to reveal the sutures

Scientific classification
- Domain: Eukaryota
- Kingdom: Animalia
- Phylum: Mollusca
- Class: Cephalopoda
- Subclass: †Ammonoidea
- Order: †Ammonitida
- Family: †Phylloceratidae
- Subfamily: †Phylloceratinae
- Genus: †Phylloceras; Suess 1865

Species
- Phylloceras serum † Oppel 1865; Phylloceras asperaense † Hillebrandt 2000; Phylloceras bakeri † Imlay 1953; Phylloceras costatoradiatum † Geyer 1886; Phylloceras cylindricum † Sowerby 1833; Phylloceras doderleinianum † Catullo 1853; Phylloceras hebertinum † Reynes 1868; Phylloceras heterophyllum † Sowerby 1820; Phylloceras meneghinii † Gemmellaro 1874; Phylloceras semisulcatum † d'Orbigny 1842; Phylloceras supraliasicum † Pompeckj 1893; Phylloceras trifoliatum † Neumayr 1871; Phylloceras velledae † Michelin 1834

= Phylloceras =

Phylloceras Temporal range: Early Jurassic–Late Cretaceous

Extinct genus of molluscs

Phylloceras is an extinct genus of ammonoid cephalopods belonging to the family Phylloceratidae. These nektonic carnivores lived from Early Jurassic (Hettangian age) to Late Cretaceous (Maastrichtian age) (from 201.30 to 66.043 Ma).

== Description ==
Shells of Phylloceras can reach a diameter of about 8–10 centimetres (3.1–3.9 in), with a maximum of about 20 centimetres (7.9 in). These primitive ammonites had an involute, laterally flattened shell with a regular shell opening. They were almost smooth and the ornamentation was virtually absent or, at most, represented by simple growth lines barely visible. The striking sinuous suture lines were characteristic of this genus. They are reminiscent, in some ways, of the leaves of plants (hence the name Phylloceras, which means " leaf-horn").

== Distribution ==
Fossils of species within this genus have been found all over the world, particularly in Western Europe.
