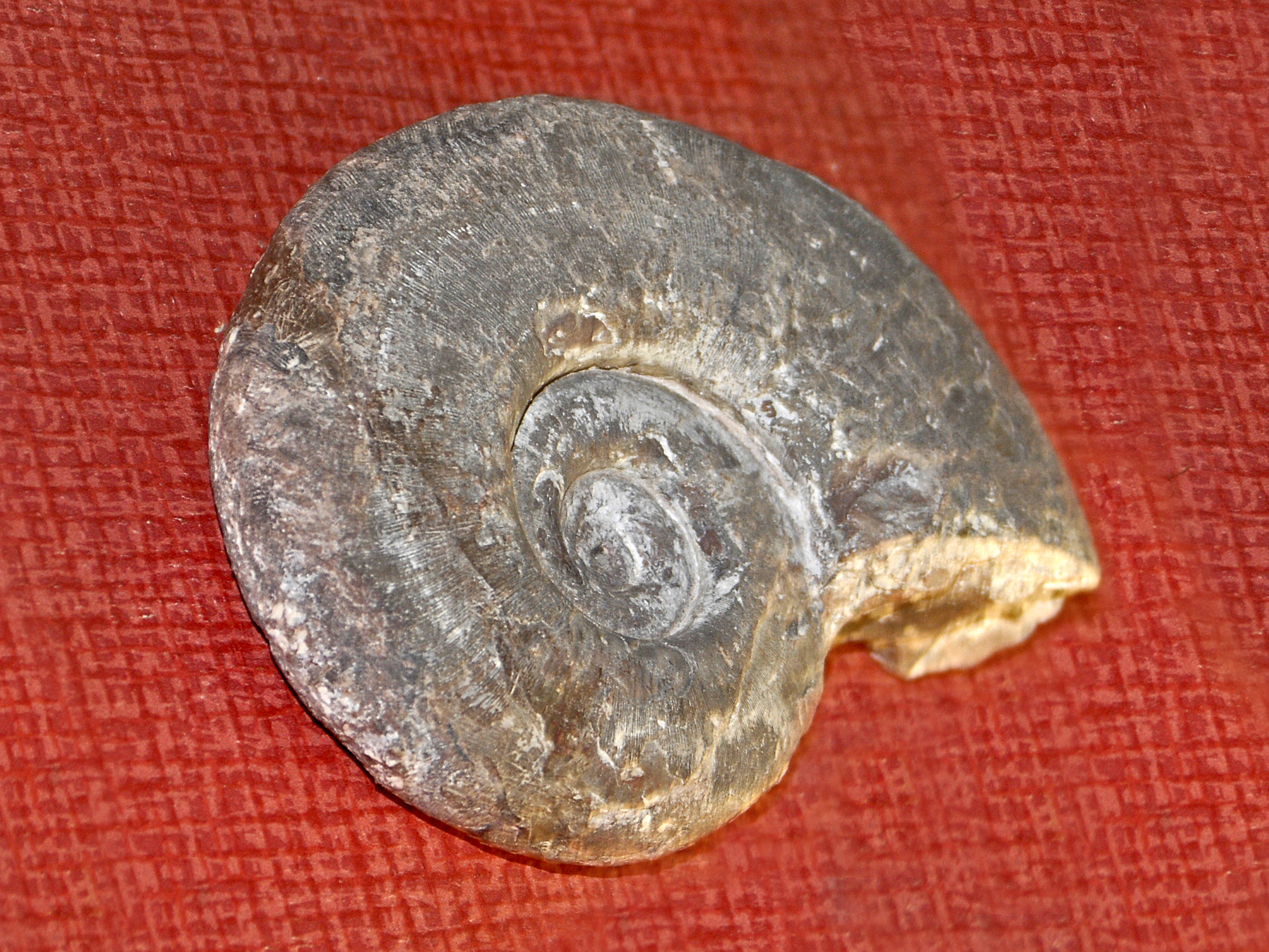
- Fossil of M. sphaerophyllus fossil from Bosnia

Scientific classification
- Kingdom: Animalia
- Phylum: Mollusca
- Class: Cephalopoda
- Subclass: †Ammonoidea
- Order: †Ammonitida
- Family: †Ussuritidae
- Genus: †Monophyllites; Mojsisovics, 1879

Species
- See text

= Monophyllites =

Monophyllites Temporal range: Anisian–Ladinian

Extinct genus of molluscs

Monophyllites is an extinct cephalopod genus belonging to the family Ussuritidae that lived during the Triassic period, from Anisian to Ladinian age.

== Description ==
"Form evolute laterally compressed. Whorl low and increasing slowly in height, little embracing and not deeply indented by the inner volution. Sides somewhat flattened, venter rounded with indistinct abdominal shoulders. Umbilicus wide and shallow exposing the greater part of the inner volutions. Umbilical shoulders abruptly rounded. The height of the whorl is more than one third of the total diameter of the shell and the breadth is about three fourths of the height of the whorl The width of the umbilicus is about one third of the total diameter of the shell. The surface is nearly smooth being ornamented only with the fiexuous striae of growth. The septa are monophyllic, the saddles rounded entire, contracted at the base and the lobes are digitate. The external lobe is divided by a narrow siphonal saddle into two bifid divisions the first lateral is distinctly and symmetrically trifid the second lateral unsymmetrically trifid. The auxiliary consists of three small secondary divisions of the umbilical lobe. Internal septa unknown"

(Original description by Hyatt and Smith, 1905).

== Species ==
The following species are recognized in the genus Monophylites

- M. agenor Muenster, 1834
- M. anatolicus Toula, 1896
- M. aonis Mojsisovics, 1882
- M. bytschkovi Vavilov, 1989
- M. caucasius Shevyrev, 1995
- M. kieperti Toula, 1896
- M. sphaerophyllus (von Hauer)
- M. wengensis Klipstein, 1843
- M. wetsoni Oppel, 1862

== Distribution ==
Fossils of species within this genus have been found in the Triassic of Afghanistan, Albania, Canada, Hungary, Italy, Japan, New Zealand, Oman, Pakistan, Russia, Switzerland, Turkey, United States.
