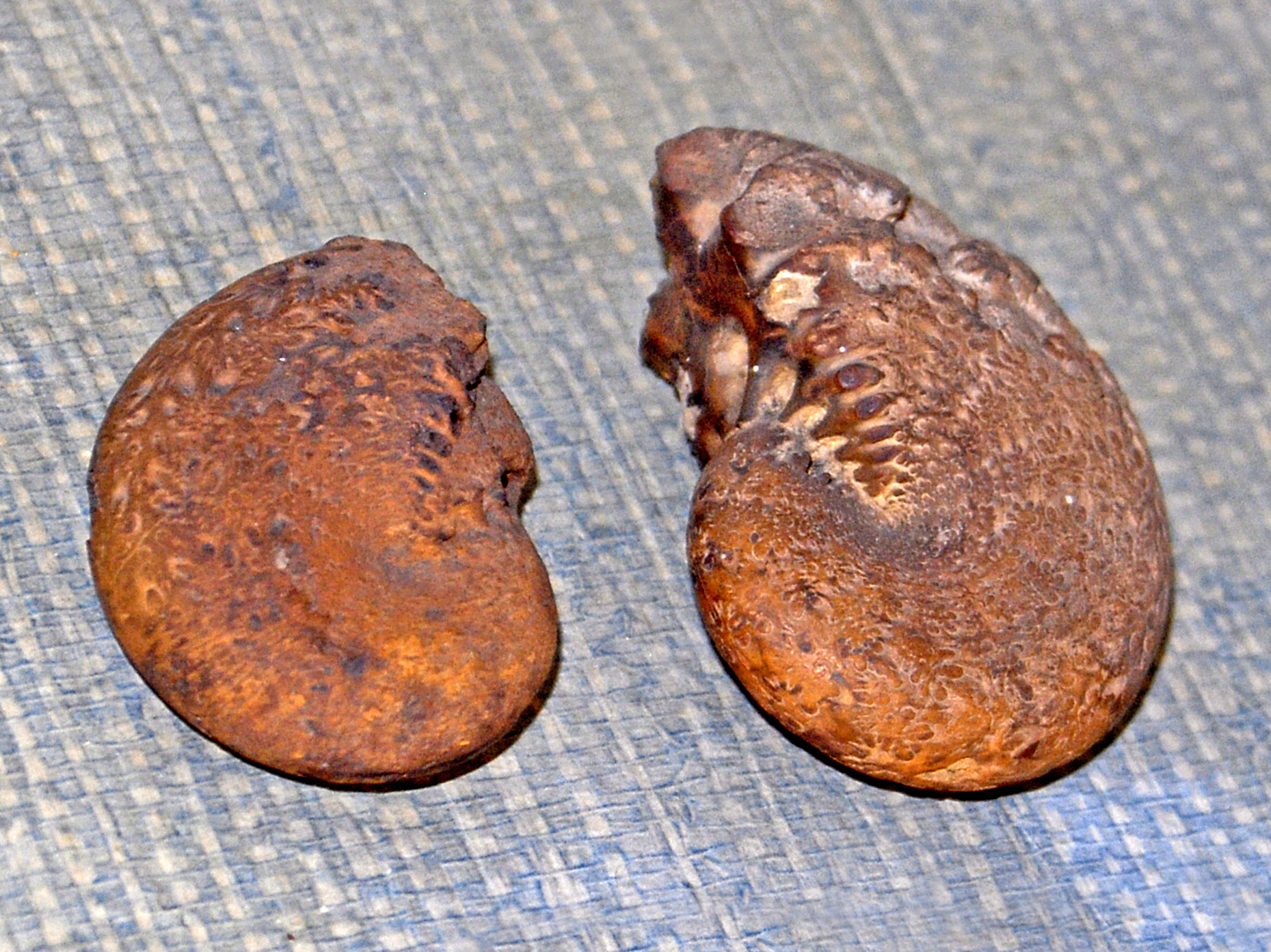
- Fossil shells of Phylloceras serum from Southern Alps, on display at Galerie de paléontologie et d'anatomie comparée in Paris

Scientific classification
- Kingdom: Animalia
- Phylum: Mollusca
- Class: Cephalopoda
- Subclass: †Ammonoidea
- Order: †Ammonitida
- Suborder: †Phylloceratina

Families
- Phylloceratidae; Discophyllitidae; Juraphyllitidae; Ussuritidae

= Phylloceratina =

Phylloceratina Temporal range: Lower Triassic–Upper Cretaceous

Extinct suborder of molluscs

The Phylloceratina are a suborder of ammonoid cephalopods, belonging to the Ammonitida, whose range extends from the Lower Triassic to the Upper Cretaceous. Shells of the Phylloceratina are generally smooth with small to large umbilici and complex sutures with leaf-like phylloid saddle endings and lobes with thornlike projections.

== Phylogeny ==
The Phylloceratina are most likely derived from the Ceratitid Deineroceratidae, which is thought to have given rise early in the Triassic to the Ussuritidae. The Ussuritidae is the ancestral family of the Phylloceratina. The Ussuritidae extend through the Upper Triassic but not into the Jurassic, and gave rise to the Upper Triassic Discophyllitidae. The Discophyllitidae is the probable source for the L Jurassic - U Cretaceous Phylloceratidae and possibly for the L Jurassic Juraphyllitidae.

The Phylloceratina gave rise early in the Jurassic through the Phylloceratidae to the Lytoceratina, which in turn gave rise to most of the Ammonitina The Phylloceratidae also gave rise to the Psiloceratoidea at the beginning of the Jurassic and to the Desmoceratoidea in the Early Cretaceous, both of which are considered Ammonitina. The Ancyloceratina is a collection of highly evolved Lytoceratina.
