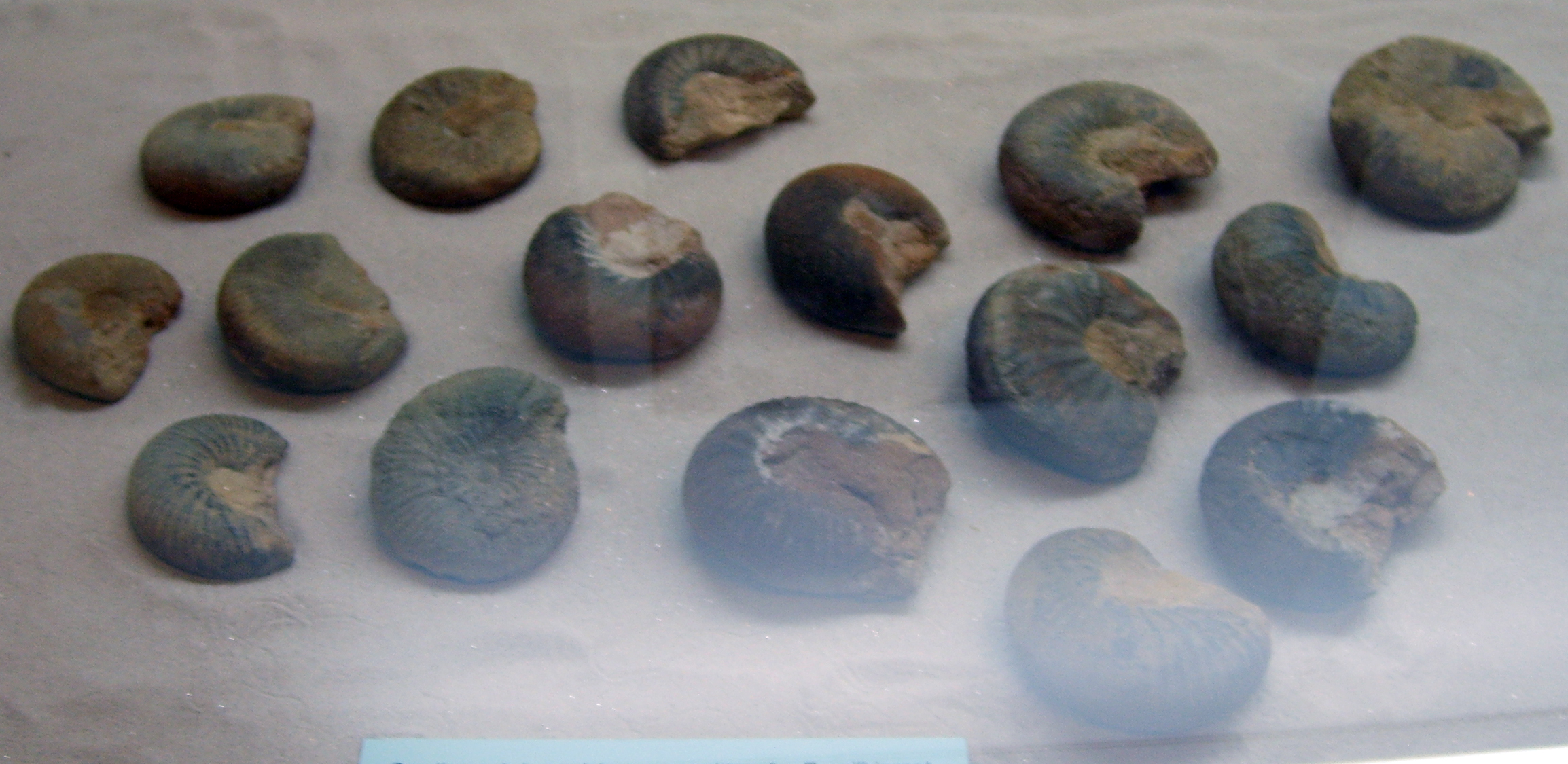
- Arcticoceras cranocephaloides fossils at the Geological Museum in Copenhagen

Scientific classification
- Kingdom: Animalia
- Phylum: Mollusca
- Class: Cephalopoda
- Subclass: †Ammonoidea
- Order: †Ammonitida
- Family: †Cardioceratidae
- Genus: †Arcticoceras; Spath, 1924

= Arcticoceras =

Arcticoceras Temporal range: Bathonian

Extinct genus of ammonoid cephalopods

Arcticoceras is an extinct ammonoid cephalopod genus from the late Middle Jurassic belonging to the ammonite family Cardioceratidae, more commonly found to high northern latitudes.

The Arcticoceras shell is involute, inner whorls sharply ribbed, outer ones becoming smooth. The suture, following the description of the Stephanoceratoidea, is complex, ammonitic, with a dominant 1st lateral lobe and well-developed umbilical lobe. May be derived from Arctocephalites.

Arcticoceras is found in northern Alaska, arctic Canada, Greenland, northern and central Russia, as well as in Wyoming, North Dakota, and Utah. Part of the fauna that lived in high latitude (arctic and subarctic) marine waters during the second half of the Middle Jurassic.

Arcticoceras kochi and A ishmanae have been found in the boreal Bathonian stage of central East Greenland. Arcticoceras and Arctocephalites are found the Volga River Basin, Sartov Region, and Arctocephalites in the Pechora River Basin indicating an earlier and deeper penetration of arctic water into European Russia than previously thought.
