= Glottoptychinites =

Glottoptychinites Temporal range: Tithonian

Scientific classification
- Kingdom: Animalia
- Phylum: Mollusca
- Class: Cephalopoda
- Subclass: †Ammonoidea
- Order: †Ammonitida
- Family: †Perisphinctidae
- Genus: †Glottoptychinites; Buckman, 1923

Genus of molluscs (fossil)

The shell, which grew to be rather large, is evolute, strongly and sharply ribbed. Ribbing is both simple and biplicate, with primary ribs bifurcating (splitting) on either flank before crossing the venter. The whorl section is round.

Glottoptychinites is similar in form to the closely related, strongly ribbed and evolute Pavlovia, Epipallasiceras, and Paravirgatites.
