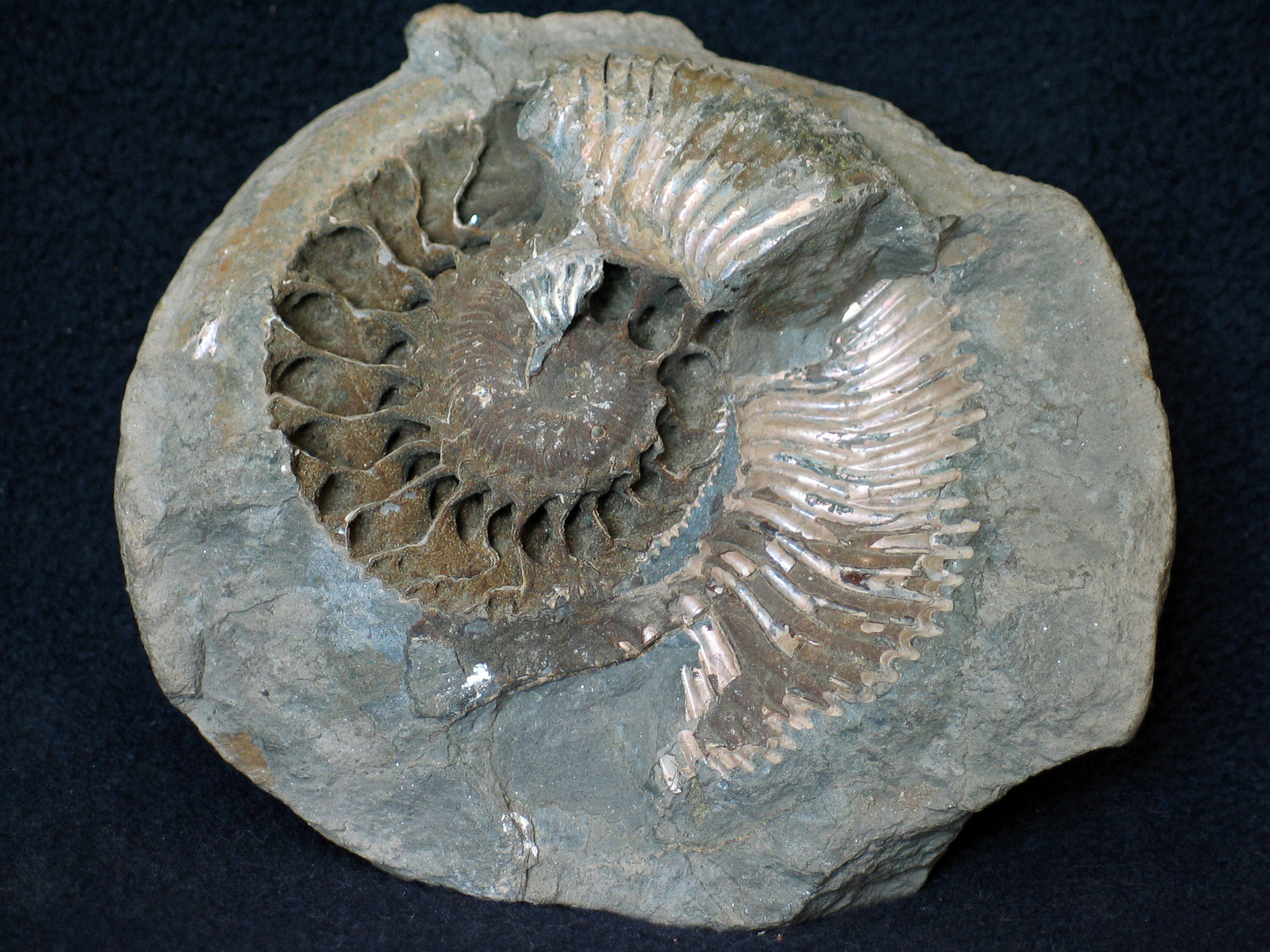
- Quenstedtoceras from Łuków, Poland

Scientific classification
- Kingdom: Animalia
- Phylum: Mollusca
- Class: Cephalopoda
- Subclass: †Ammonoidea
- Order: †Ammonitida
- Family: †Cardioceratidae
- Genus: †Quenstedtoceras; Hyatt, 1877

= Quenstedtoceras =

Quenstedtoceras Temporal range: Late Jurassic, 160–154 Ma

Genus of molluscs (fossil)

Quenstedtoceras is a genus of ammonoid cephalopods that lived during the latter part of the Jurassic period in what is now France, Poland, Germany, and the United Kingdom.

== Morphologic description ==
The shell of Quenstedtoceras is typically evolute and strongly ribbed, with all whorls visible. Widths vary according to the species from rather narrow to somewhat broad, as does ribbing. Ribs commonly start at the umbilical shoulder and extend laterally to about mid flank where they divide and curve forward toward the outer rim, or venter, and meet at a keel. Shells are of moderate size, commonly reaching diameters of about 6 cm (2.4 in).

== Taxonomy and phylogeny ==
Quenstedtoceras, included in the superfamily Stephanocerataceae, now revised to Stephanoceratoidea, is first of the subfamily Cardioceratinae, derived from Cadoceras or related genus is the mid or late Callovian and gave rise at the end of its range in the early Oxfordian to Cardioceras.
