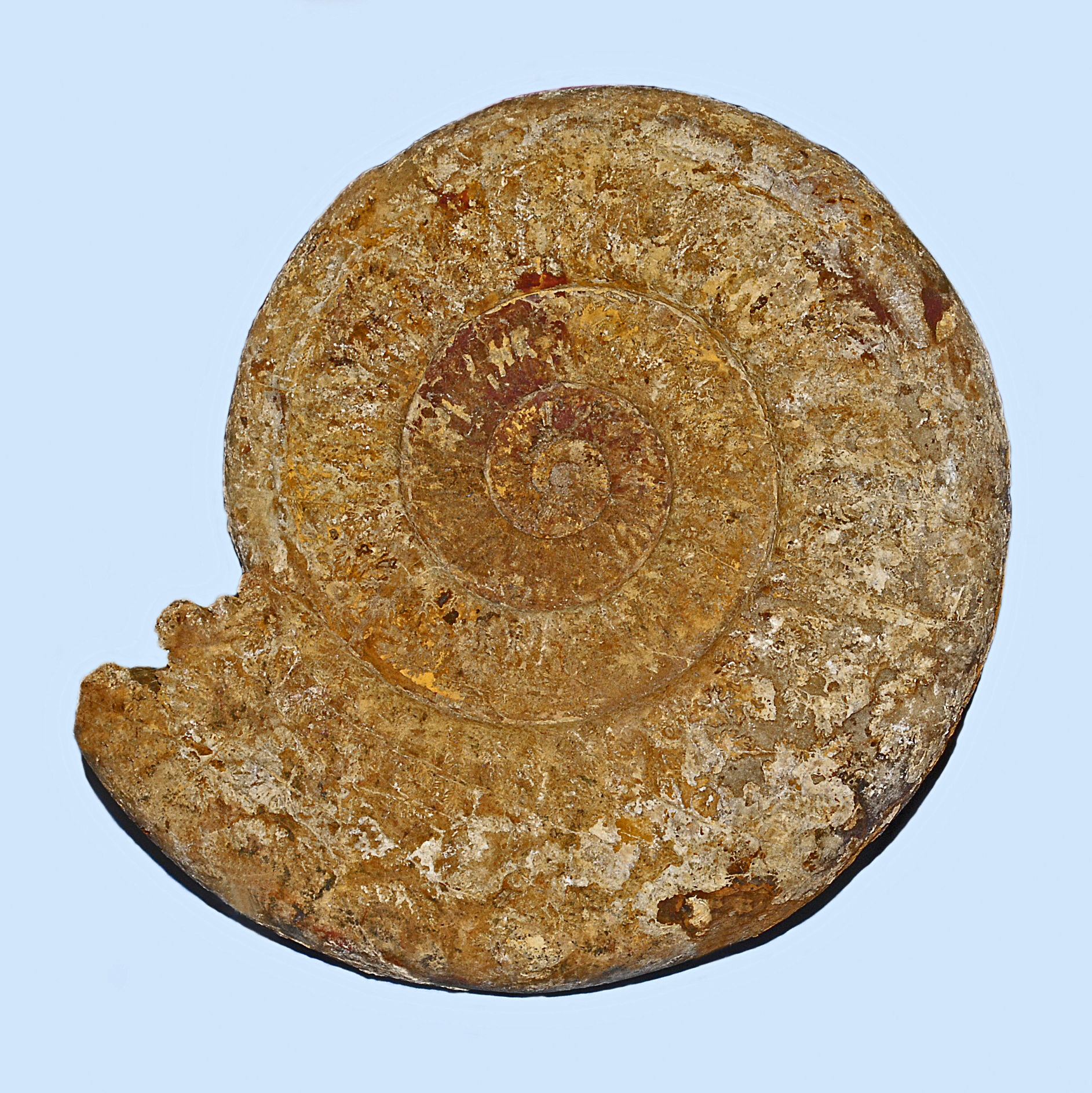
- Progeronia lictor from Tulear (Madagascar), Kimmeridgian stage

Scientific classification
- Kingdom: Animalia
- Phylum: Mollusca
- Class: Cephalopoda
- Subclass: †Ammonoidea
- Order: †Ammonitida
- Family: †Perisphinctidae
- Genus: †Progeronia (Arkell, 1953)

= Progeronia =

Progeronia Temporal range: Jurassic

Genus of molluscs (fossil)

Progeronia is a genus of ammonites belonging to the family Perisphinctidae.

These fast-moving nektonic carnivores lived in the Jurassic period, from 155.7 to 150.8 Ma.

== Species ==
Species within this genus include:

- Progeronia breviceps
- Progeronia lictor
- Progeronia polyplocoides

== Description ==
Shells of Progeronia species can reach a diameter of 6–23 millimetres (0.24–0.91 in). These large shell are large and involute, with a bifurcated or trifurcated ribs.

== Distribution ==
Fossils of species within this genus have been found in the Jurassic sediments of Algeria and Hungary.
