= Epicephalites =

Epicephalites Temporal range: U Jurassic

Scientific classification
- Kingdom: Animalia
- Phylum: Mollusca
- Class: Cephalopoda
- Subclass: †Ammonoidea
- Order: †Ammonitida
- Family: †Perisphinctidae
- Genus: †Epicephalites; Spath, 1928

Genus of molluscs (fossil)

Epicephalites is a perisphinctid ammonite, included in the subfamily Aulacostephaninae, from the Upper Jurassic of New Zealand and Mexico, related to Involuticeras. Its shell is involute, whorls inflated with a deep umbilicus. The outer half including the venter is ribbed; the inner half is smooth.
