= Aulacosphinctoides =

Aulacosphinctoides Temporal range: Kimmeridgian–Tithonian

Scientific classification
- Kingdom: Animalia
- Phylum: Mollusca
- Class: Cephalopoda
- Subclass: †Ammonoidea
- Order: †Ammonitida
- Family: †Perisphinctidae
- Genus: †Aulacosphinctoides; Spath, 1923

Species
- See text

Genus of molluscs (fossil)

Aulacosphinctoides is an extinct ammonoid cephalopod that lived during the Late Jurassic (Late Kimmeridgian to early Tithonian), included in the ammonitid family Perisphinctidae.

The shell of Aulacosphinctoides is evolute, whorls broadly rounded, ribs sigmoid that mostly bifurcate, but often trifurcate, Lappets present. Closely resembles Torquantisphinctes, differing in having more rounded or depressed whorls and more sigmoid and frequently triplicate ribbing.

The genus Aulacosphinctoides has been found in Somalia, northern India, Japan, Argentina, Mexico, New Zealand, and Madagascar.
