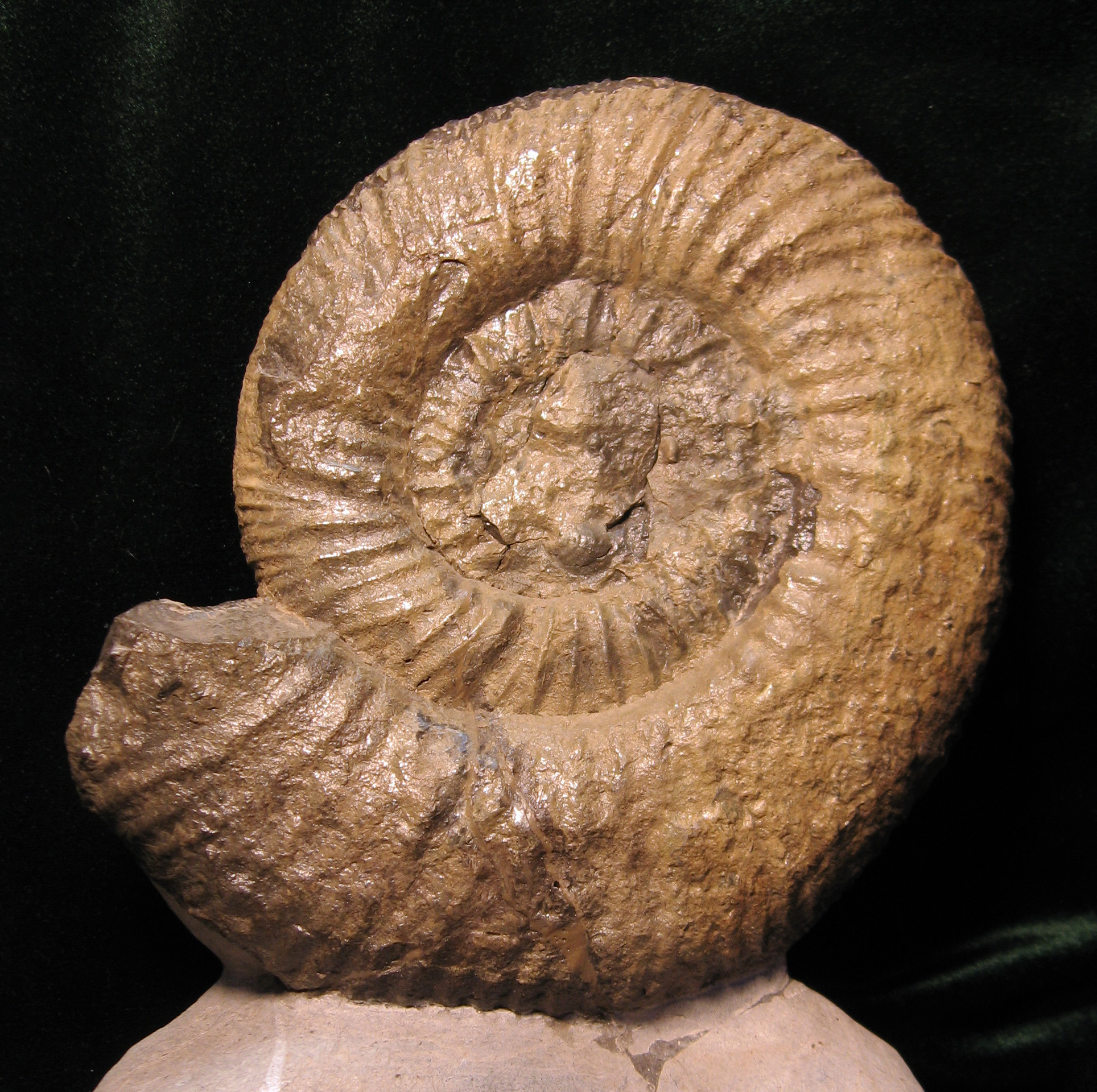
- Cobbanite talkeetnanus fossil

Scientific classification
- Domain: Eukaryota
- Kingdom: Animalia
- Phylum: Mollusca
- Class: Cephalopoda
- Subclass: †Ammonoidea
- Order: †Ammonitida
- Family: †Perisphinctidae
- Genus: †Cobbanites; Imlay, 1962

= Cobbanites =

Genus of molluscs (fossil)

Cobbanites is a genus of extinct ammonoid cephalopods from the Family Perisphinctidae. Species of the genus date from the Jurassic (Bathonian to Early Callovian) period and have been found in the US (Alaska and Montana).

== Species ==
Cobbanites can be split into two species as follows:

- Cobbanites engleri
- Cobbanites talkeetnanus
