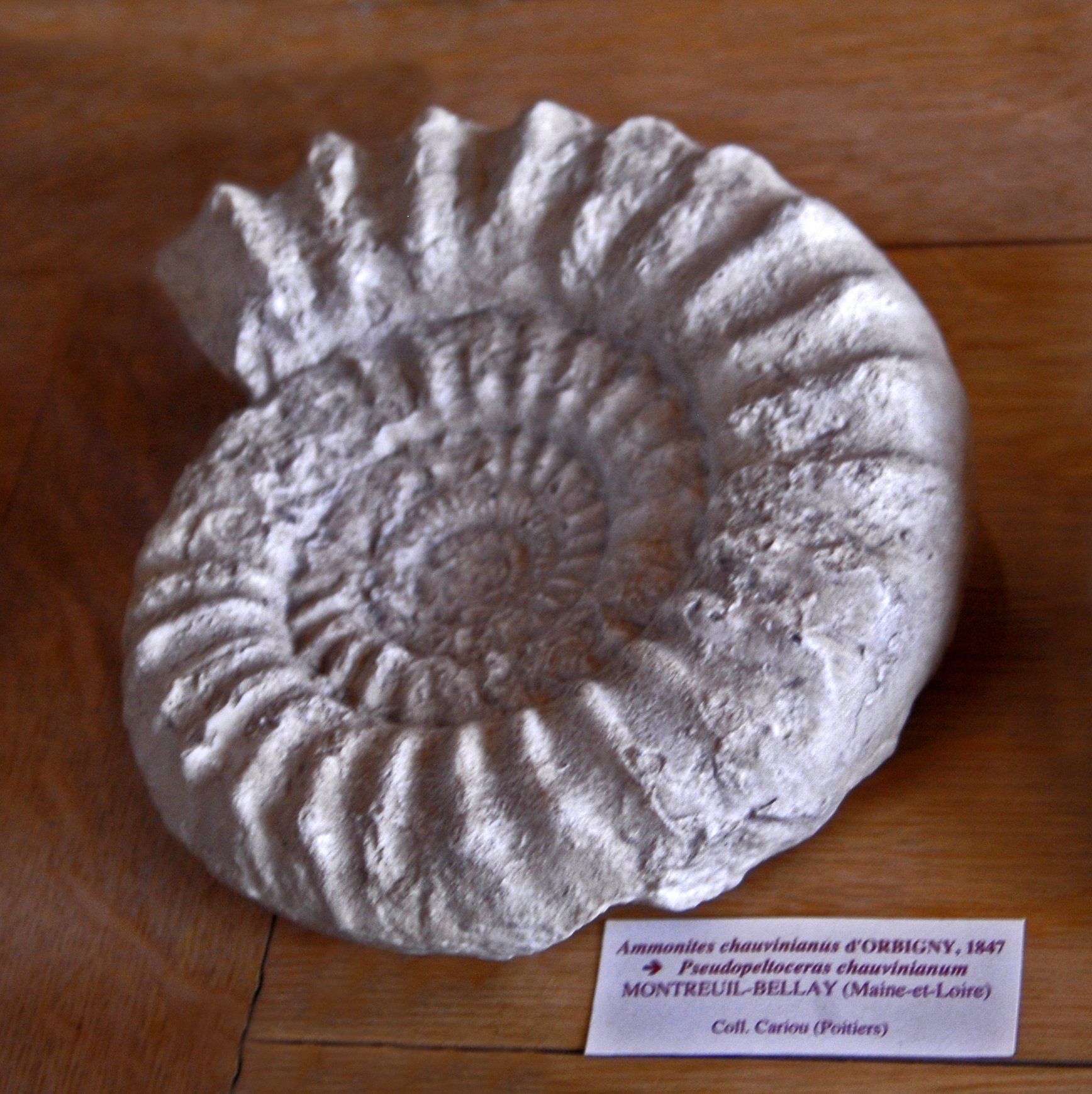
- Fossil of Pseudopeltoceras chauvinianum from France, on display at Galerie de paléontologie et d'anatomie comparée in Paris

Scientific classification
- Kingdom: Animalia
- Phylum: Mollusca
- Class: Cephalopoda
- Subclass: †Ammonoidea
- Order: †Ammonitida
- Family: †Perisphinctidae
- Genus: †Pseudopeltoceras; Spath 1928

= Pseudopeltoceras =

Pseudopeltoceras Temporal range: late Middle Jurassic (Callovian), 164.7–155.7 Ma

Genus of molluscs (fossil)

Pseudopeltoceras is a genus of perisphinctoid ammonites belonging to the family Perisphinctidae.

These fast-moving nektonic carnivores lived during the Middle Jurassic, upper Callovian stage.

== Distribution ==
Fossils of species within this genus have been found in the Jurassic of Argentina, France and Germany.
