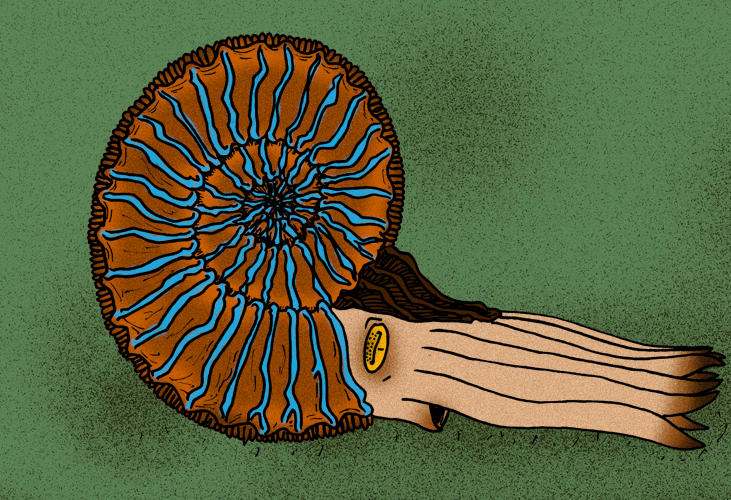
- Restoration of A. alternans

Scientific classification
- Kingdom: Animalia
- Phylum: Mollusca
- Class: Cephalopoda
- Subclass: †Ammonoidea
- Order: †Ammonitida
- Family: †Cardioceratidae
- Genus: †Amoeboceras; Hyatt in Eastman-Zittel, 1900

= Amoeboceras =

Amoeboceras Temporal range: Oxfordian–Kimmeridgian

Genus of molluscs (fossil)

Amoeboceras is an extinct genus of ammonite cephalopod closely related to the genus Cardioceras. Fossils are found in Late Jurassic-aged marine strata of Europe and Russia.
