= Funiferites =

Funiferites Temporal range: Callovian

Scientific classification
- Kingdom: Animalia
- Phylum: Mollusca
- Class: Cephalopoda
- Subclass: †Ammonoidea
- Order: †Ammonitida
- Family: †Cardioceratidae
- Subfamily: †Cadoceratinae
- Genus: †Funiferites; Kiselev et al., 2003

Type species
- Ammonites funiferus Phillips, 1829

Species
- F. allae Kiselev, 1999; F. patruus Eichwald, 1868; F. funiferi Phillips, 1829

Extinct genus of ammonites

Funiferites is genus of ammonite that lived during end of middle and in upper Callovian stage of middle Jurassic.

== Description ==
Ammonites of this genus had large shells. At the beginning of this evolutionary lineage, cross sectio. of shell was highly oval with rounded venter. Later, it has changed into subtriangular, or keeled. Ribs are curved sinusoidally and they are bending on the venter. During ontogeny, ribs are beginning to disappear from the sides. They are lasting the longest on the venter, mostly in the case of keeled specimens.

== Evolution ==
Genus Funiferites is a single evolutionary lineage. Its predecessor is Longaeviceras alpha. This gave rise to F. allae that evolved into F. patruus. Descendant of that one is F. funiferi.

== Validity ==
In 2002, few months before this genus has been erected, Ammonites funiferus, a type of Funiferites has been added into a new subgenus Chamousettia (Platychamousettia). Because of this, there is an opinion that Funiferites is only a junior synonym of subgenus Platychamousettia. This opinion is opposed by another one (which one is debated even in a paper in which Funiferites has been described), that Platychamousettia is not a valid taxon and that there are identification and stratigraphic problems in its establishing and it is only a synonym of genus Chamousettia. This would mean, that Funiferites is a valid taxon.

== Literature ==
Kiselev D. N., Gulyaev D. B., Rogov M. A. (2003) Origin and systematic position of Funiferites, a new genus of the Callovian cardioceratid (Ammonoidea). In: N. A. Bogdanov, T. I. Vasil’eva, V. E. Verzbitsky et al. (Eds.). Modern questions of geology. Materials of the 3rd Lectures in Memory of Yanshine (March 26–28, 2003). Moscow: Nauchny mir. P. 220-225., 1 fig. [in Russian: Происхождение и систематическое положение Funiferites – нового рода келловейских кардиоцератид (Ammonoidea)].
