= Bigotites =

Bigotites Temporal range: Bajocian

Scientific classification
- Kingdom: Animalia
- Phylum: Mollusca
- Class: Cephalopoda
- Subclass: †Ammonoidea
- Order: †Ammonitida
- Family: †Perisphinctidae
- Genus: †Bigotites

Species
- None cataloged

Genus of molluscs (fossil)

Bigotites is strongly ribbed, round-whorled perisphinctid ammonitic cephalopod from the middle Jurassic with a smooth band along the outer edge of the shell.
