= Cleistosphinctes =

Cleistosphinctes Temporal range: Bajocian

Scientific classification
- Kingdom: Animalia
- Phylum: Mollusca
- Class: Cephalopoda
- Subclass: †Ammonoidea
- Order: †Ammonitida
- Family: †Perisphinctidae
- Genus: †Cleistosphinctes

Cleistosphinctes is an extinct cephalopod genus from the ammonite order that lived during the Middle Jurassic.

Cleistosphinctes, named by Arkell, 1953, and included in the family Perisphinctidae and superfamily Perisphinctaceae, is small, compressed, evolute, with long secondary ribs and very large asymmetric spatulate lappets that embrace the sides of the preceding whorl.
