= Alligaticeras =

Alligaticeras Temporal range: Callovian–Oxfordian

Scientific classification
- Domain: Eukaryota
- Kingdom: Animalia
- Phylum: Mollusca
- Class: Cephalopoda
- Subclass: †Ammonoidea
- Order: †Ammonitida
- Family: †Perisphinctidae
- Subfamily: †Perisphinctinae
- Genus: †Alligaticeras; Buckman, 1923

Genus of molluscs (fossil)

Alligaticeras is an extinct genus of cephalopod belonging to the ammonite subclass.
