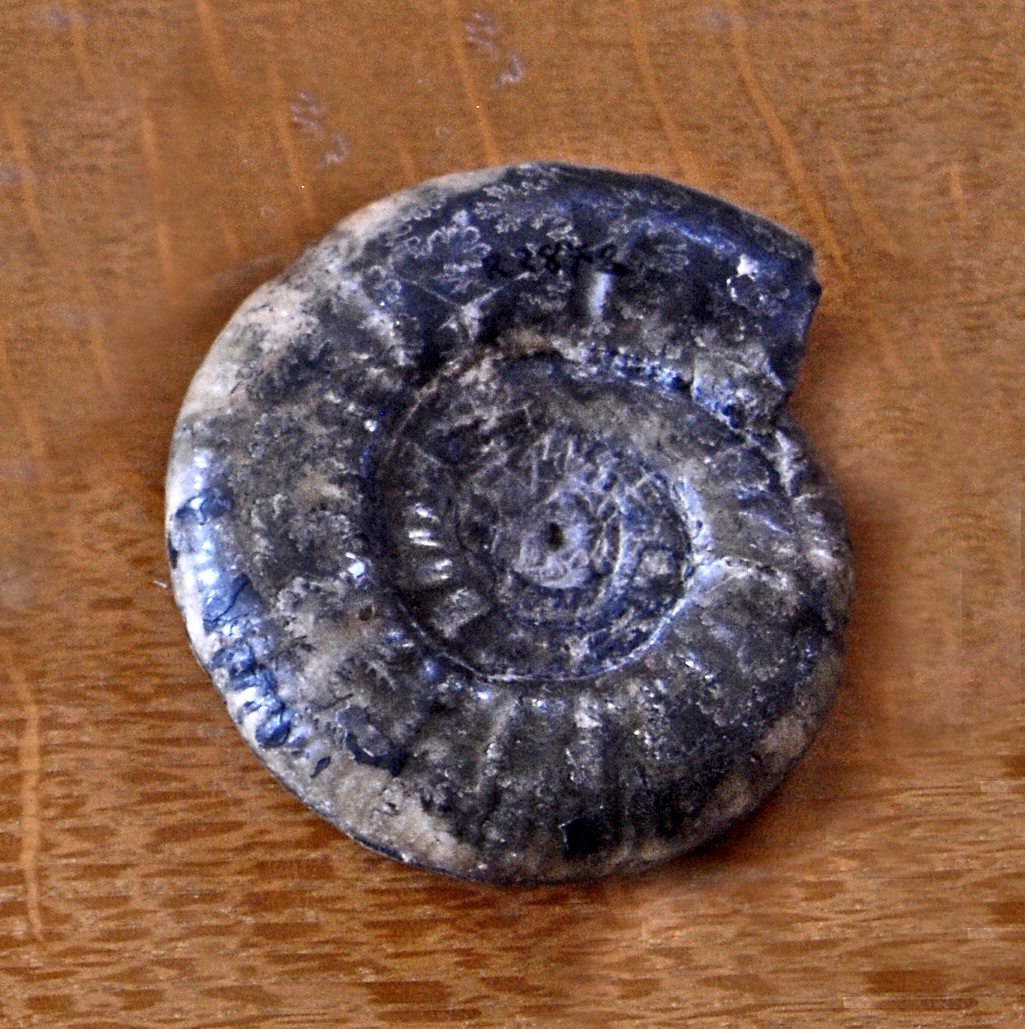
- Fossil shell of Rasenia cymodoce from Calvados (France), on display at Galerie de paléontologie et d'anatomie comparée in Paris

Scientific classification
- Kingdom: Animalia
- Phylum: Mollusca
- Class: Cephalopoda
- Subclass: †Ammonoidea
- Order: †Ammonitida
- Family: †Aulacostephanidae
- Genus: †Rasenia; Salfeld, 1913

= Rasenia =

Rasenia Temporal range: Jurassic (Kimmeridgian), 155.7–150.8 Ma

Genus of molluscs

Rasenia is an extinct ammonoid cephalopod genus belonging to the superfamily Perisphinctoidea. These fast-moving nektonic carnivores lived during the Upper Jurassic period, in the Kimmeridgian and Tithonian ages.

== Etymology ==
This genus gets its name from Market Rasen in Lincolnshire, England, where it is frequently found.

== Distribution ==
Fossils of species within this genus have been found in the Jurassic sediments of Russia, France and the United Kingdom.
