= Flabellisphinctes =

Flabellisphinctes Temporal range: Callovian

Scientific classification
- Kingdom: Animalia
- Phylum: Mollusca
- Class: Cephalopoda
- Subclass: †Ammonoidea
- Order: †Ammonitida
- Family: †Perisphinctidae
- Genus: †Flabellisphinctes; Mangold & Elmi, 1966

Genus of molluscs (fossil)

Flabellisphinctes is small, evolute genus of perisphinctid ammonite. Its fossils are known from the upper Middle Jurassic (Callovian), which occurred between 160 and 154 million years ago.

Flabellisphinctes is included in the subfamily Grossouviinae which is part of the Perisphinctidae. The shell is around 5 cm (abt. 2in) in diameter, with closely spaced radial ribs on the inner whorls. Outer whorls with ribs are more widely spaced, coming off the umbilical shoulder and flattening about mid flank, and dividing near the ventrolateral shoulder into well-defined ribs that cross the venter with a kink mid-way. Whorl cross-section is suboval and compressed, with a narrowly arched rim.
