= Xenostephanus =

Xenostephanus may refer to:

- preoccupied synonym (1963) of Zenostephanus, an ammonite genus
- Xenostephanus (mammal) (1962), a genus of notoungulates in the family Oldfieldthomasiidae
