= Cranocephalites =

Cranocephalites Temporal range: Bajocian–Bathonian

Scientific classification
- Kingdom: Animalia
- Phylum: Mollusca
- Class: Cephalopoda
- Subclass: †Ammonoidea
- Order: †Ammonitida
- Family: †Cardioceratidae
- Genus: †Cranocephalites

Extinct genus of molluscs

Cranocephalites is a Middle Jurassic ammonitid genus named by Spath in 1932 and included in the family Cranoceratidae, superfamily Stephanoceratacea.

Cranocephalites, sometimes considered a subgenus of Arctocephalites which has sharply ribbed inner whorls and a smooth outer whorl, has a constricted eccentric body chamber. It is found in middle Jurassic sediments in Alaska, Greenland, Novaya-Zemlya, and eastern Siberia.
