= Involuticeras =

Involuticeras Temporal range: Kimmeridgian

Scientific classification
- Kingdom: Animalia
- Phylum: Mollusca
- Class: Cephalopoda
- Order: Ammonitida
- Family: Perisphinctidae
- Genus: Involuticeras Quenstedt, 1846

Genus of molluscs (fossil)

Involuticeras is a perisphinctoid ammonite belonging to the Aulacostephanininae from the Upper Jurassic of Europe and possibly Mexico. The shell is involute, moderately compressed, with a rounded and ribbed venter. The genus is similar in general form to Aulacostephanus and Epicephalites.
