= Oxfordian age =

First age of the late Jurassic

Oxfordian
- 161.5 ± 1.0 – 154.8 ± 0.8 Ma
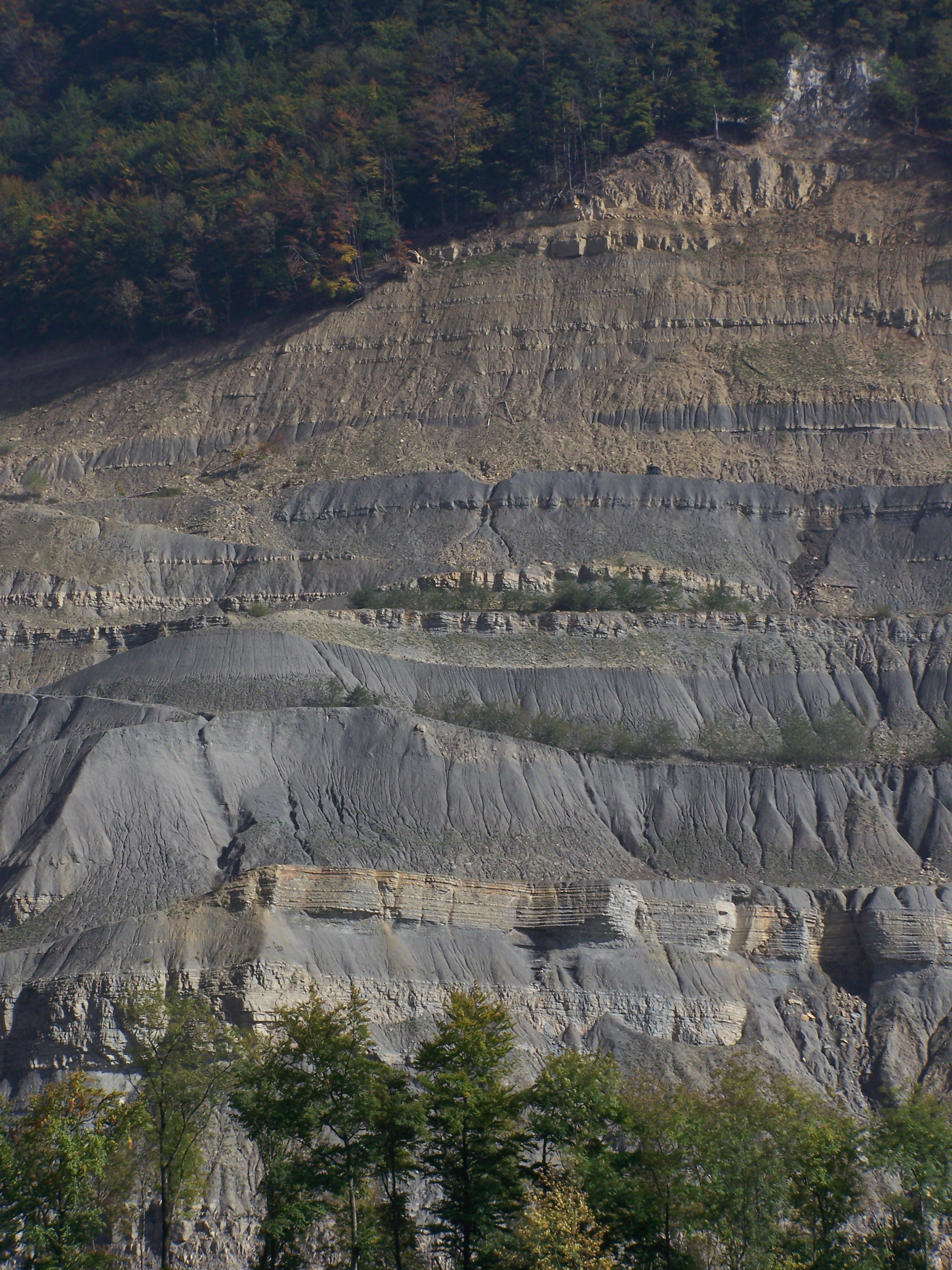
- Cyclically alternating limestone (light, more competent) and marl/clay layers of Oxfordian age at Péry-Reuchenette, near Tavannes, Jura Mountains, Switzerland.

Chronology
← / Triassic–Jurassic extinction event
Subdivision of the Jurassic according to the ICS, as of 2024. Vertical axis scale: Millions of years ago

Etymology
- Name formality: Formal

Usage information
- Celestial body: Earth
- Regional usage: Global (ICS)
- Time scale(s) used: ICS Time Scale

Definition
- Chronological unit: Age
- Stratigraphic unit: Stage
- Time span formality: Formal
- Lower boundary definition: FAD of ammonite species Brightia thuouxensis
- Lower boundary definition candidates: Horizon of the Ammonite Cardioceras redcliffense.
- Lower boundary GSSP candidate section(s): Redcliff Point, Dorset, UK; Savouron, Provence, France
- Upper boundary definition: FAD of the Ammonite Pictonia baylei
- Upper boundary GSSP: Flodigarry, Skye, Scotland, UK; 57.6610°N 6.2455°W
- Upper GSSP ratified: 2021

The Oxfordian is, in the ICS' geologic timescale, the earliest age of the Late Jurassic Epoch, or the lowest stage of the Upper Jurassic Series. It spans the time between 161.5 ± 1.0 Ma and 154.8 ± 0.8 Ma (million years ago). The Oxfordian is preceded by the Callovian and is followed by the Kimmeridgian.

== Stratigraphic definitions ==
The Oxfordian Stage was called "Clunch Clay and Shale" by William Smith (1815–1816); in 1818 W. Buckland described them under the unwieldy title "Oxford, Forest or Fen Clay". The term Oxfordian was introduced by Alcide d'Orbigny in 1844. The name is derived from the English city of Oxford, where the beds are well developed, but they crop out almost continuously from Dorset to the coast of Yorkshire, generally forming low, broad valleys. They are well exposed at Weymouth, Oxford, Bedford, Peterborough, and in the cliffs at Scarborough, Red Cliff and Gristhorpe Bay. Rocks of this age are found also in Uig and Skye.

The base of the Oxfordian Stage is defined as the point in the stratigraphic record where the ammonite species Brightia thuouxensis first appears. A global reference profile for the base (a GSSP) had in 2009 not yet been assigned. The top of the Oxfordian Stage (the base of the Kimmeridgian) is at the first appearance of ammonite species Pictonia baylei.

In the Tethys domain, the Oxfordian contains six ammonite biozones:

- zone of Epipeltoceras bimammatum
- zone of Perishinctes bifurcatus
- zone of Gregoryceras transversarium
- zone of Perisphinctes plicatilis
- zone of Cardioceras cordatum
- zone of Quenstedtoceras mariae
