= Arctocephalites =

Arctocephalites Temporal range: Bathonian

Scientific classification
- Kingdom: Animalia
- Phylum: Mollusca
- Class: Cephalopoda
- Subclass: †Ammonoidea
- Order: †Ammonitida
- Family: †Cardioceratidae
- Genus: †Arctocephalites; Spath, 1928

Arctocephalites is an extinct ammonitic cephalopod genus from the Middle Jurassic with a wide northern distribution belonging to the stephanoceratoidean family, Cardioceratidae.

The inner whorls of the Arctocephalites shell are sharply ribbed but change abruptly to smooth. The such, as characteristic of the family, is complex with large first lateral lobe and well-developed umbilical lobe.

Arctocephalites has been found in Bathonian age sediments at Cook Inlet, Alaska, in western Montana, and in the North Sea at paleolatitudes ranging from about 30deg N to 50deg N. It has been found in equivalent age sediments in the Volga and Pechora river basin in Russia as well as in Greenland, FanzJoseph Land, NovayZemlya, and eastern Siberia.
