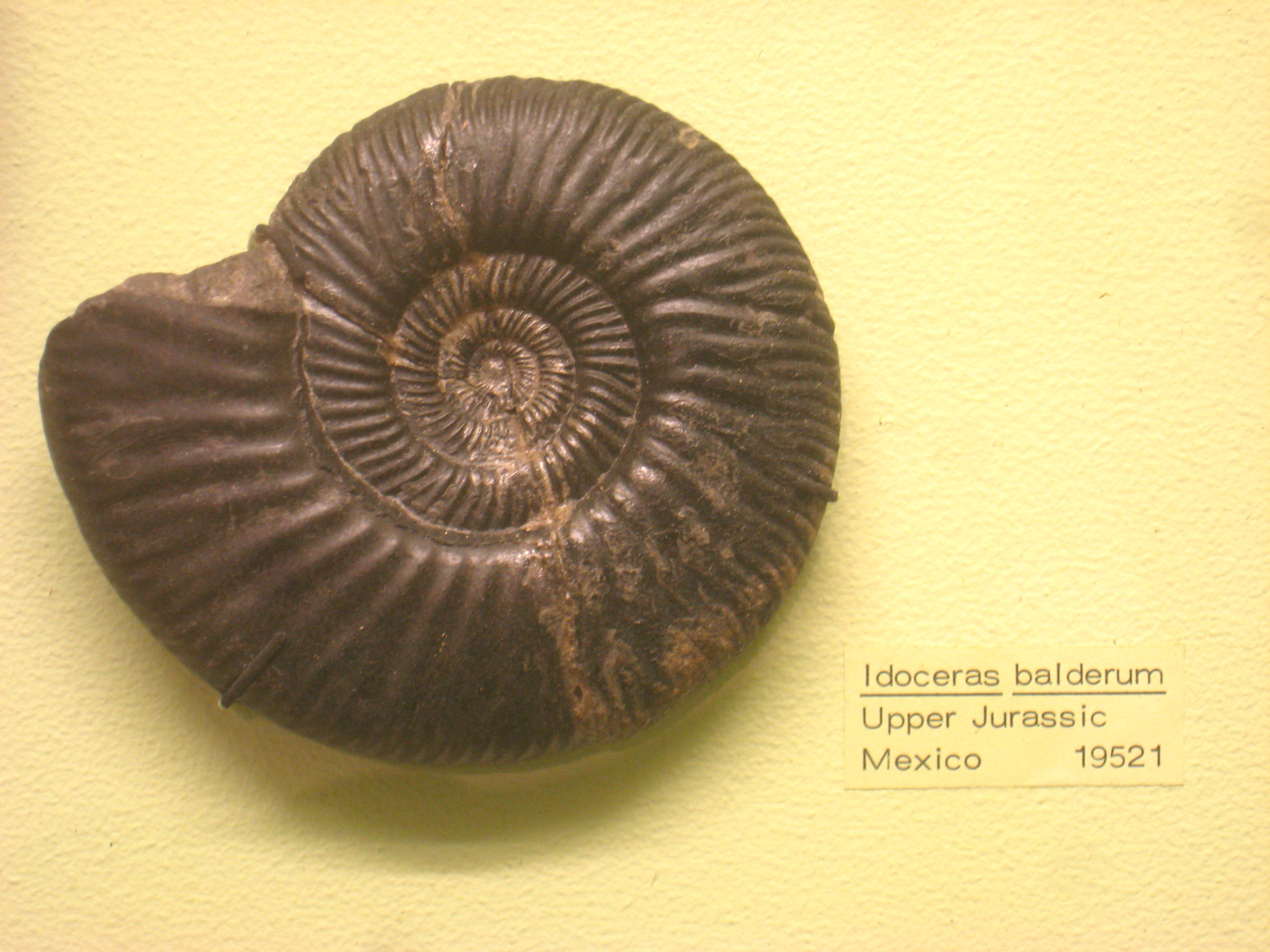
- Fossil of Idoceras balderum from Mexico.

Scientific classification
- Kingdom: Animalia
- Phylum: Mollusca
- Class: Cephalopoda
- Subclass: †Ammonoidea
- Order: †Ammonitida
- Family: †Perisphinctidae
- Subfamily: †Idoceratinae
- Genus: †Idoceras; Burckhardt, 1906

= Idoceras =

Idoceras Temporal range: Oxfordian–Kimmeridgian

Genus of molluscs (fossil)

Idoceras is a genus of perisphictacean ammonite, belonging to the Perisphinctidae subfamily Idoceratinae. The genus is known from the Upper Jurassic, with a widespread distribution. Shells of Idoceras are evolute, with a wide umbilicus; ribbing strong, bifurcate high on flanks. Suture simpler than in the similar Ataxioceras.
