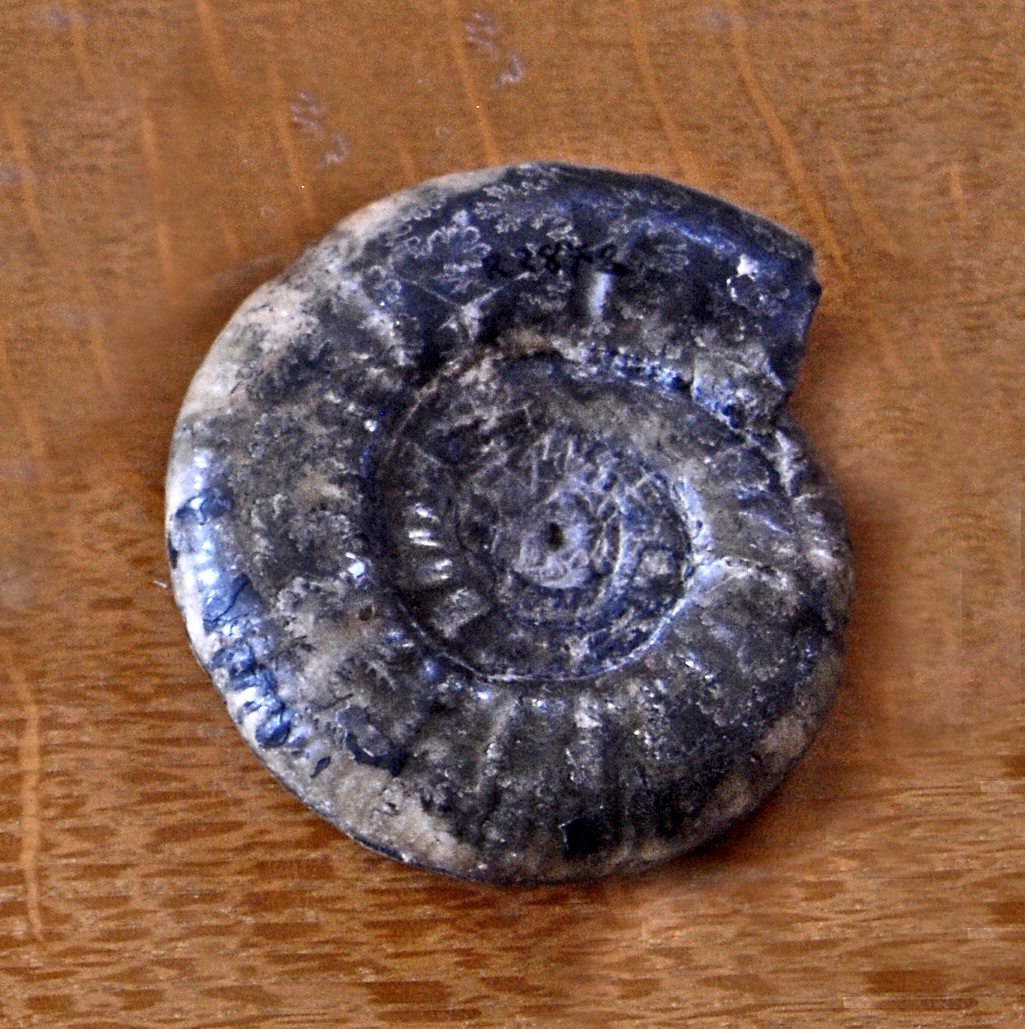
- Fossil shell of Rasenia cymodoce from Calvados (France), on display at Galerie de paléontologie et d'anatomie comparée in Paris

Scientific classification
- Kingdom: Animalia
- Phylum: Mollusca
- Class: Cephalopoda
- Subclass: †Ammonoidea
- Order: †Ammonitida
- Superfamily: †Perisphinctoidea
- Family: †Aulacostephanidae; Spath, 1924

= Aulacostephanidae =

Aulacostephanidae Temporal range: Jurassic (Oxfordian-Tithonian), 160–150.8 Ma

Extinct family of molluscs

Aulacostephanidae is an extinct ammonoid cephalopod family belonging to the superfamily Perisphinctoidea. These fast-moving nektonic carnivores lived during the Upper Jurassic period, from the Oxfordian to Tithonian ages.

== Genera ==
Genera within this family include:

- Aulacostephanus
- Pictonia
- Rasenia
- Ringsteadia
