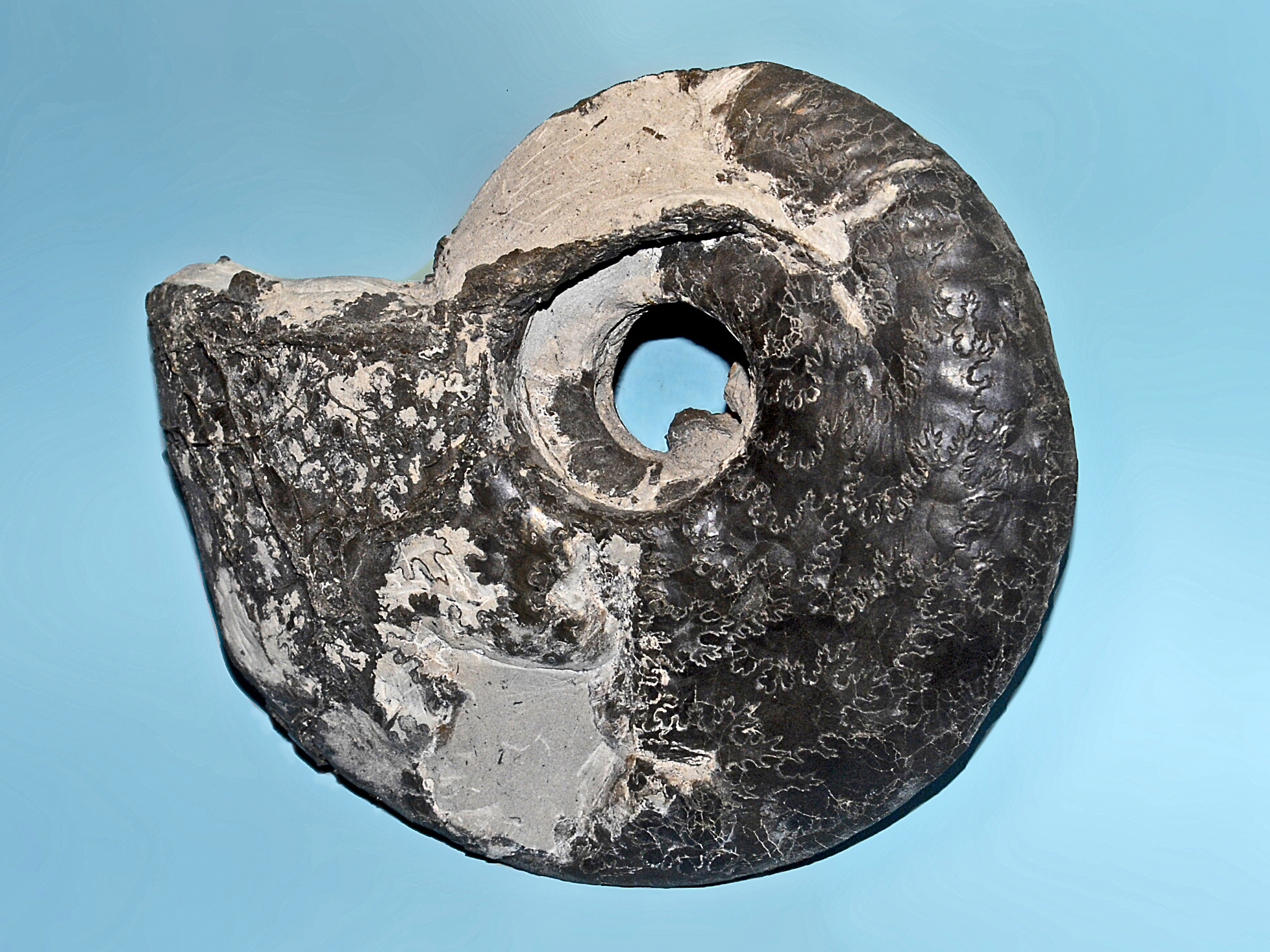
- Fossil of Lamberticeras species from Calvados, Villers-sur-Mer

Scientific classification
- Kingdom: Animalia
- Phylum: Mollusca
- Class: Cephalopoda
- Subclass: †Ammonoidea
- Order: †Ammonitida
- Family: †Cardioceratidae
- Genus: †Lamberticeras; Buckman, 1920

Synonyms
- Lambericeras

= Lamberticeras =

Lamberticeras Temporal range: Jurassic, upper Callovian 166.1–163.5 Ma

Genus of molluscs (fossil)

Lamberticeras is an extinct ammonite genus belonging to the family Cardioceratidae.

These fast-moving nektonic carnivores lived during the Jurassic period, in the upper Callovian age.
