= Ringsteadia =

Ringsteadia Temporal range: Oxfordian–Kimmeridgian

Scientific classification
- Kingdom: Animalia
- Phylum: Mollusca
- Class: Cephalopoda
- Subclass: †Ammonoidea
- Order: †Ammonitida
- Family: †Aulacostephanidae
- Genus: †Ringsteadia; Salfeld, 1913

Genus of molluscs (fossil)

Ringsteadia is a genus of Jurassic ammonites.

== Distribution ==
Ringsteadia specimens have been found in France, Germany, the Russian Federation and the United Kingdom.

== Species ==
- Ringsteadia anglica Salfeld, 1917
- Ringsteadia bassettensis Spath, 1935
- Ringsteadia brandesi Salfeld, 1917
- Ringsteadia evoluta Salfeld, 1917
- Ringsteadia frequens Salfeld, 1917
- Ringsteadia marstonensis Salfeld, 1917
- Ringsteadia pseudocordata Blake and Hudleston, 1877
- Ringsteadia pseudoyo Salfeld, 1917
- Ringsteadia salfeldi Dorn, 1925
- Ringsteadia sphenoidea Buckman, 1926
