= Zenostephanus =

Zenostephanus Temporal range: U Jura

Scientific classification
- Kingdom: Animalia
- Phylum: Mollusca
- Class: Cephalopoda
- Subclass: †Ammonoidea
- Order: †Ammonitida
- Family: †Perisphinctidae
- Genus: †Zenostephanus; Arkell& Callomon,(1963)

Genus of molluscs (fossil)

Zenostephanus is true ammonite genus from the lower part of the Upper Jurassic of eastern England and Scotland belonging to the ammonitid family, Perisphinctidae.

Zenostephanus is revised from Xenostephanus, a preoccupied name for a new genus of toxodont notoungulate from Argentina. The type is Aulacostephanus ranbyensis
