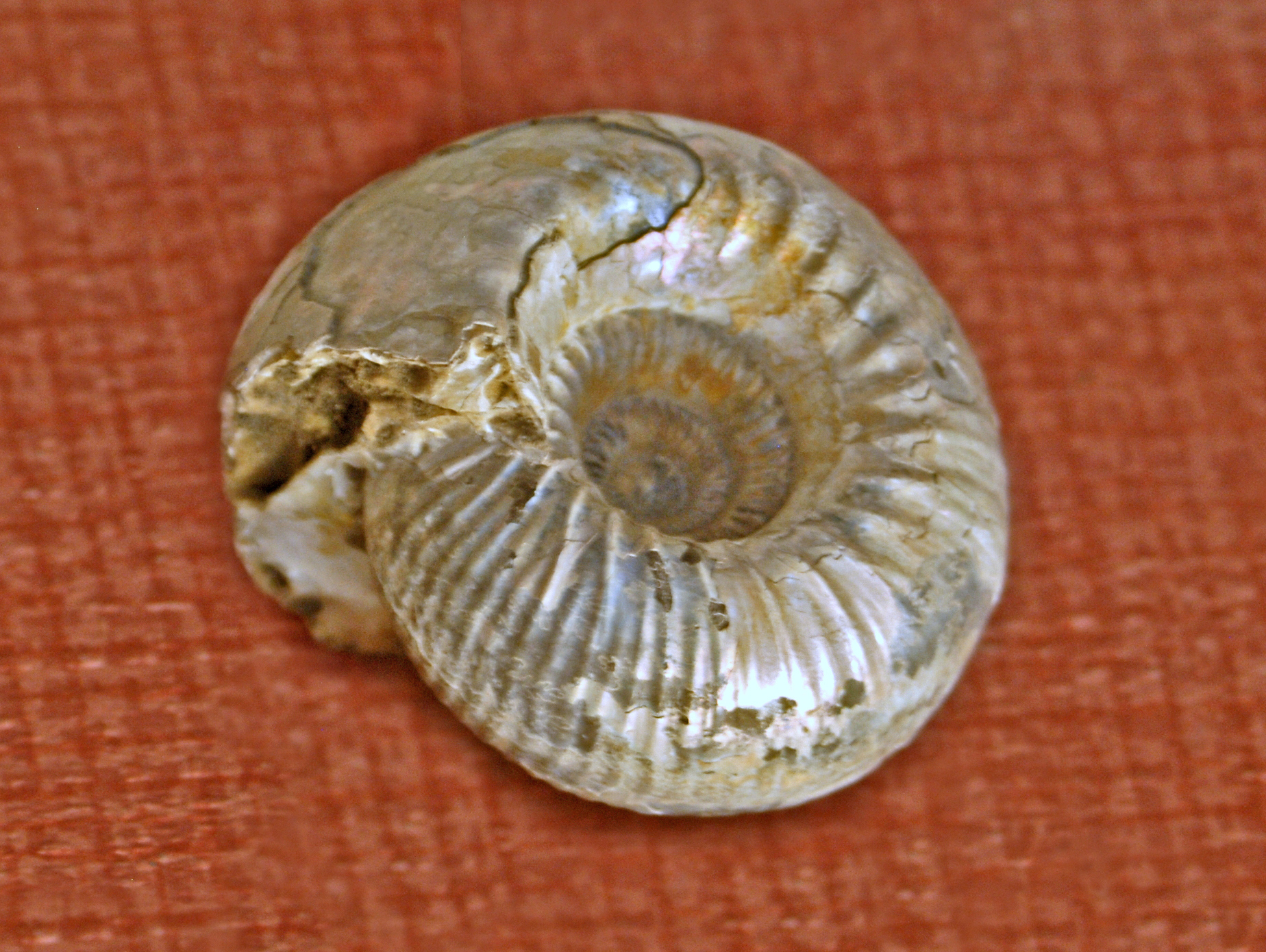
- C. elatmae fossil from Russia

Scientific classification
- Kingdom: Animalia
- Phylum: Mollusca
- Class: Cephalopoda
- Subclass: †Ammonoidea
- Order: †Ammonitida
- Family: †Cardioceratidae
- Genus: †Cadoceras; Fischer, 1882

= Cadoceras =

Cadoceras Temporal range: late Bajocian - early Callovian) 164.7–161.2 Ma

Genus of molluscs (fossil)

Cadoceras is an extinct ammonite genus belonging to the Cardioceratidae that lived during the Jurassic period from the late Bajocian to the early Callovian.

== Morphology ==
The typical Cadoceras shell is strongly ribbed, subglobular, with a broadly rounded venter, strongly embracing whorls, deep umbilicus, and a smile-like crescent-shaped aperture. Ribs arise from the umbilical shoulder and bifurcate (divide in two) about mid flank and cross the venter without interruption. Species vary in the nature of ribbing and roundness of the umbilical shoulder.

== Distribution ==
Fossils of species within this genus have been found in Jurassic sediments of Canada, Germany, Russia, and the UK.
