= Kimmeridgian =

Second age of the late Jurassic

- 154.8 ± 0.8 – 149.2 ± 0.7 Ma

Chronology
← / Triassic–Jurassic extinction event
Subdivision of the Jurassic according to the ICS, as of 2024. Vertical axis scale: Millions of years ago

Etymology
- Name formality: Formal

Usage information
- Celestial body: Earth
- Regional usage: Global (ICS)
- Time scale(s) used: ICS Time Scale

Definition
- Chronological unit: Age
- Stratigraphic unit: Stage
- Time span formality: Formal
- Lower boundary definition: FAD of the Ammonite Pictonia baylei
- Lower boundary GSSP: Flodigarry, Skye, Scotland, UK; 57.6610°N 6.2455°W
- Lower GSSP ratified: 2021
- Upper boundary definition: Not formally defined
- Upper boundary definition candidates: Base of magnetic polarity chronozone M22An.; FAD of the Ammonite genus Gravesia
- Upper boundary GSSP candidate section(s): Mount Crussol, France; Canjuers, France; Fornazzo, Sicily, Italy

In the geologic timescale, the Kimmeridgian is an age in the Late Jurassic Epoch and a stage in the Upper Jurassic Series. It spans the time between 154.8 ±0.8 Ma and 149.2 ±0.7 Ma (million years ago). The Kimmeridgian follows the Oxfordian and precedes the Tithonian.

== Stratigraphic definition ==
The Kimmeridgian Stage takes its name from the village of Kimmeridge on the Dorset coast, England. The name was introduced into the literature by French geologist Alcide d'Orbigny in 1842, although it seems to have been first suggested by Thomas Webster in 1812. The Kimmeridge Clay Formation takes its name from the same type location (although this formation extends from the Kimmeridgian stage of the Upper Jurassic into the Lower Cretaceous). It is the source for about 95% of the petroleum in the North Sea.

Historically, the term Kimmeridgian has been used in two different ways. The base of the interval is the same but the top was defined by British stratigraphers as the base of the Portlandian (sensu anglico) whereas in France the top was defined as the base of the Tithonian (sensu gallico). The differences have not yet been fully resolved; As of 2004 Tithonian is the uppermost stage of the Jurassic in the timescale of the ICS.

The base of the Kimmeridgian is at the first appearance of ammonite species Pictonia baylei in the stratigraphic column. The Global Boundary Stratotype Section and Point (GSSP) for the base of the Kimmeridgian is the Flodigarry section at Staffin Bay on the Isle of Skye, Scotland, which was ratified in 2021. The boundary is defined by the first appearance of ammonites marking the boreal Bauhini Zone and the subboreal Baylei Zone. The top of the Kimmeridgian (the base of the Tithonian) is at the first appearance of ammonite species Hybonoticeras hybonotum. It also coincides with the top of magnetic anomaly M22An.

=== Subdivision ===
The Kimmeridgian is sometimes subdivided into Upper and Lower substages. In the Tethys domain, the Kimmeridgian contains seven ammonite biozones:

- zone of Hybonoticeras beckeri
- zone of Aulacostephanus eudoxus
- zone of Aspidoceras acanthicum
- zone of Crussoliceras divisum
- zone of Ataxioceras hypselocyclum
- zone of Sutneria platynota
- zone of Idoceras planula
