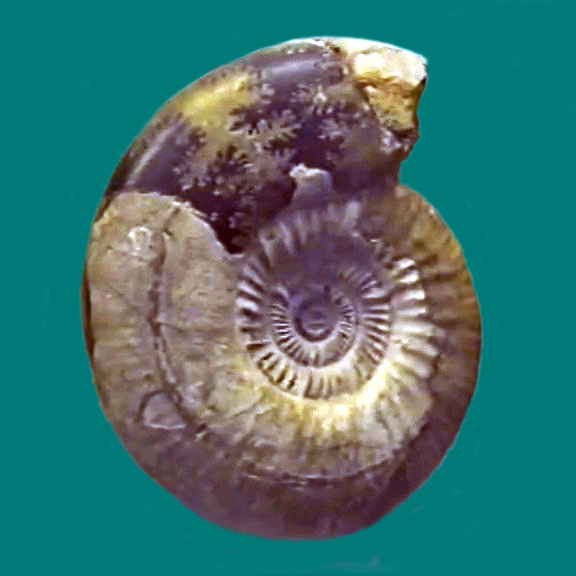
- Fossil shell of Pictonia baylei, on display at Natural History Museum, London

Scientific classification
- Kingdom: Animalia
- Phylum: Mollusca
- Class: Cephalopoda
- Subclass: †Ammonoidea
- Order: †Ammonitida
- Family: †Aulacostephanidae
- Genus: †Pictonia; Bayle, 1878

= Pictonia =

Pictonia Temporal range: Jurassic (Kimmeridgian), 152.1–157.3 Ma

Genus of molluscs (fossil)

Pictonia is an extinct ammonoid cephalopod genus belonging to the family Aulacostephanidae. These fast-moving nektonic carnivores lived during the Jurassic period, Kimmeridgian age (from 152.1 to 157.3 mya).

== Species ==
Species within this genus include:

- Pictonia baylei
- Pictonia densicostata
- Pictonia gracilis
- Pictonia seminudata

== Distribution ==
Fossils of species within this genus have been found in the Jurassic sediments of Germany, Russia and United Kingdom.
