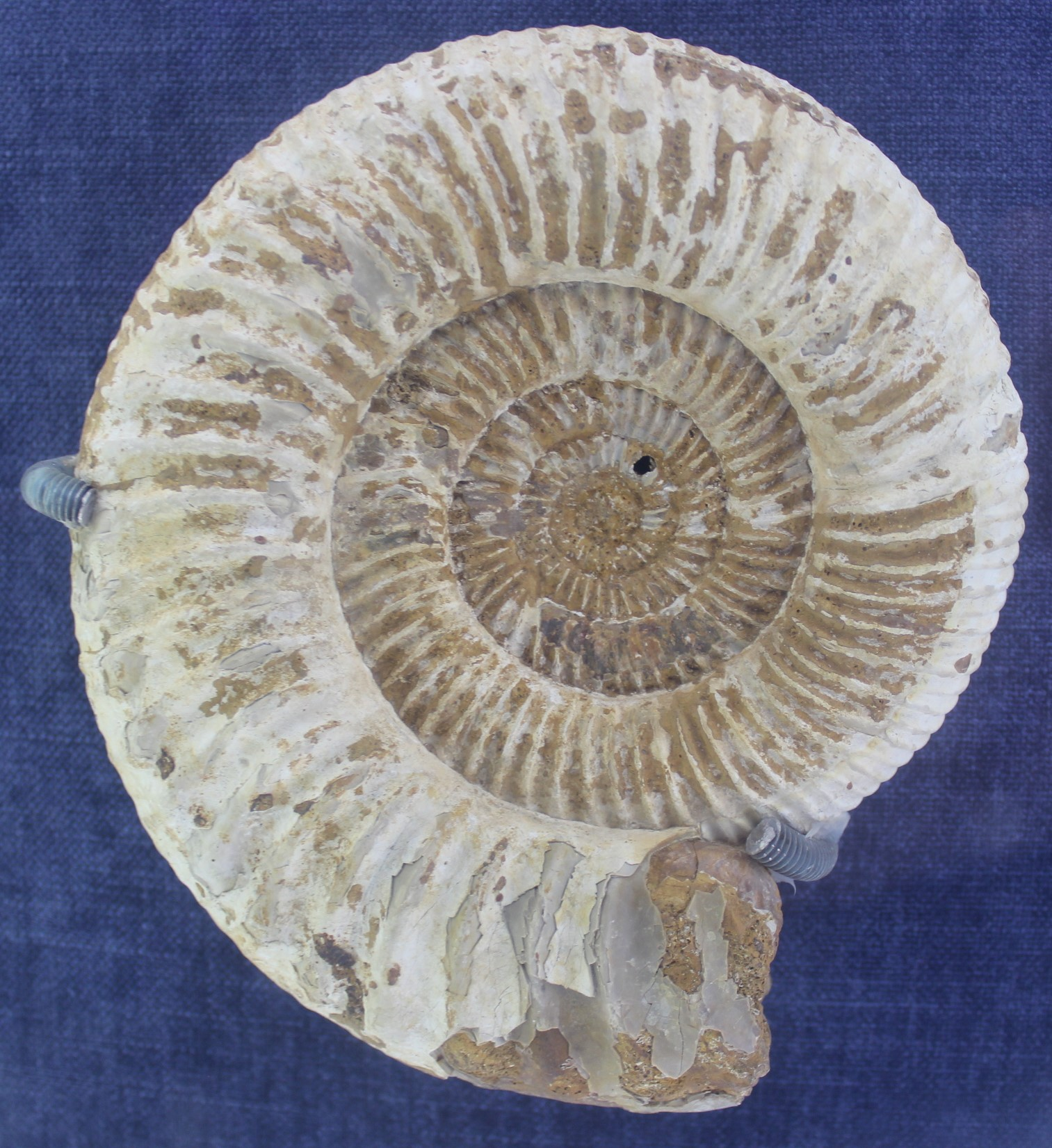
- Specimen on display at the National Natural History Museum of China

Scientific classification
- Kingdom: Animalia
- Phylum: Mollusca
- Class: Cephalopoda
- Subclass: Ammonoidea
- Order: Ammonitida
- Superfamily: Perisphinctoidea
- Family: Dorsoplanitidae
- Genus: Pavlovia Ilovaisky, 1917

= Pavlovia =

Pavlovia Temporal range: Tithonian–Late Cretaceous

Genus of molluscs (fossil)

Pavlovia is an extinct genus of ammonite of the Late Jurassic to Late Cretaceous (age range: 150.8 to 99.7 Ma).

== Species ==
- Pavlovia menneri † Michailov 1957
- Pavlovia pavlovi † Michalsky 1890

== Description ==
The shells of these fast-moving nektonic carnivores reach a diameter of about 40 millimetres (1.6 in). They are distinctively-ribbed, with windings that do not overlap largely each other. The suture lines are complicated and securely fastened to the shell wall.

== Distribution ==
Fossils of these ammonites have been found in Tithonian-aged marine strata of Late Jurassic Russia, and in Cretaceous-aged marine-strata of Great Britain.
