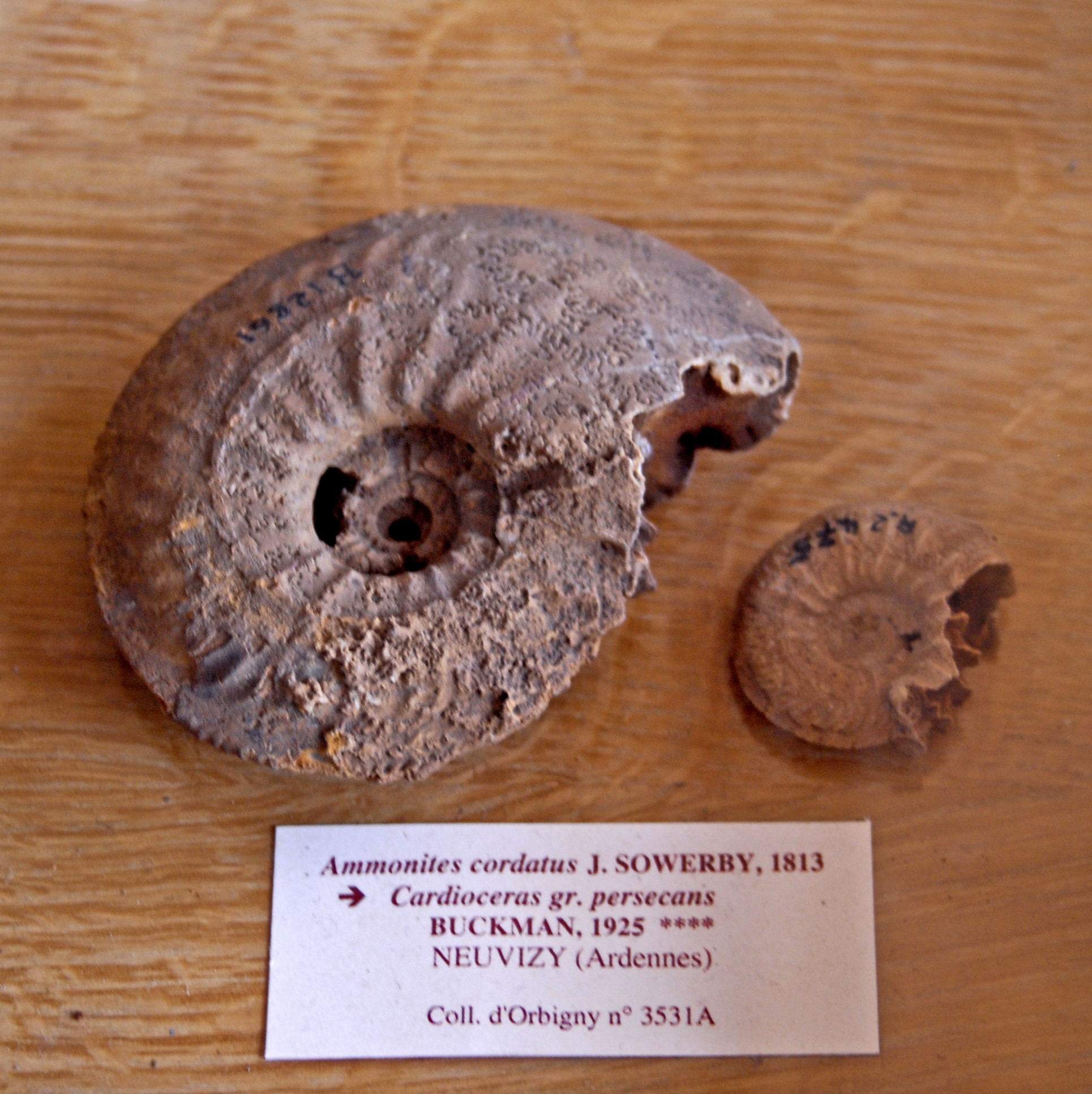
- Fossil of Cardioceras persecans from France, on display at Galerie de paléontologie et d'anatomie comparée in Paris

Scientific classification
- Kingdom: Animalia
- Phylum: Mollusca
- Class: Cephalopoda
- Subclass: †Ammonoidea
- Order: †Ammonitida
- Family: †Cardioceratidae
- Genus: †Cardioceras; Neumayr & Uhlig, 1881

= Cardioceras =

Cardioceras Temporal range: Jurassic, 161.2–155.7 Ma

Genus of molluscs (fossil)

Cardioceras is an extinct ammonite genus belonging to the family Cardioceratidae. These fast-moving nektonic carnivores lived during the Jurassic period, Oxfordian age.

== Description ==
Shells of Cardioceras species can reach a diameter of 20–25 millimetres (0.79–0.98 in). The shape is circular, with ribs and a prominent ridge along the dorsal edge.

== Distribution ==
Fossils of species within this genus have been found in the Jurassic of France, Germany, Poland, Russia, the United Kingdom and Alaska.
