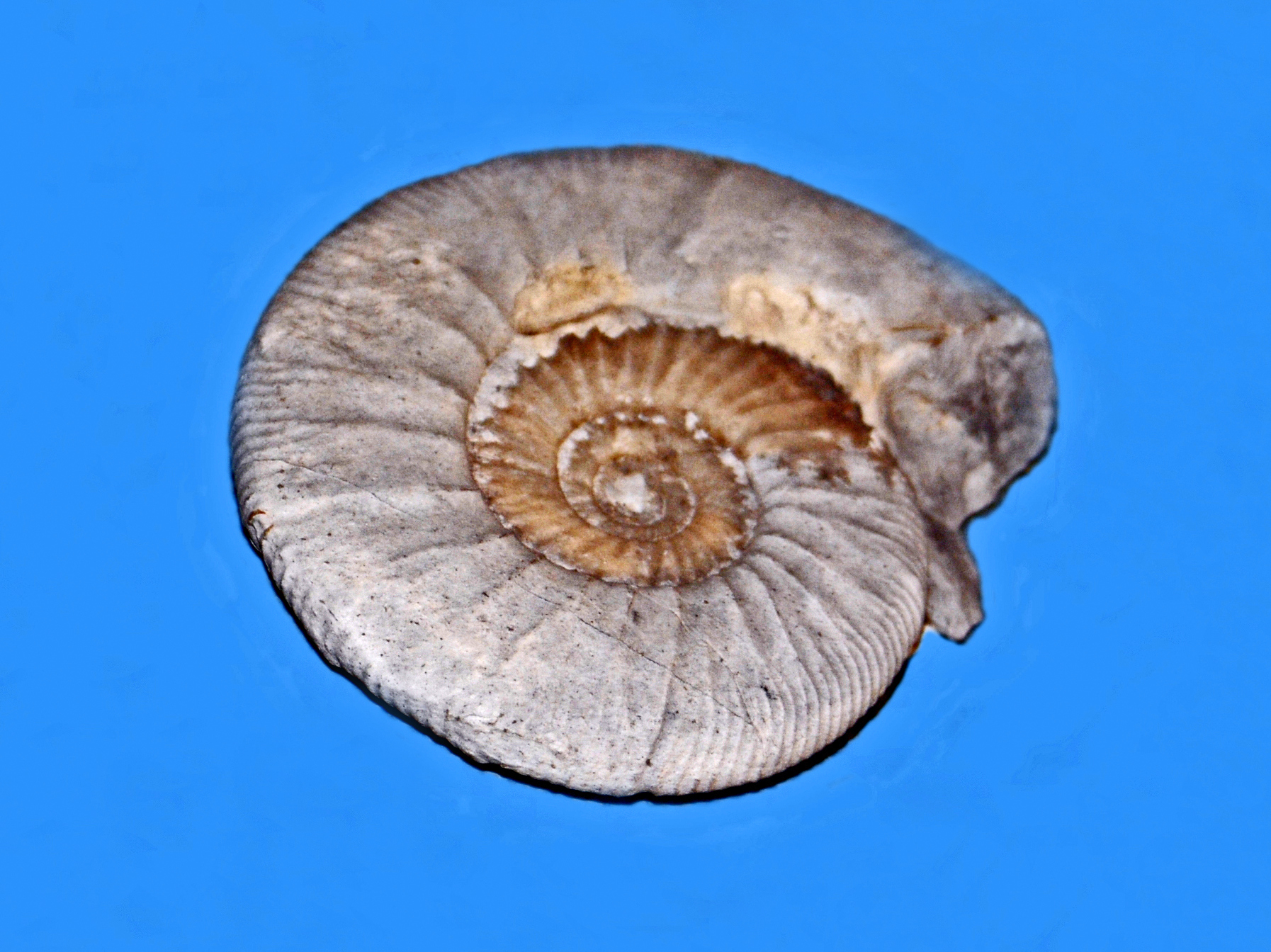
- Ataxioceras conditum fossil, Germany

Scientific classification
- Kingdom: Animalia
- Phylum: Mollusca
- Class: Cephalopoda
- Subclass: †Ammonoidea
- Order: †Ammonitida
- Family: †Ataxioceratidae
- Genus: †Ataxioceras

Species
- See text

= Ataxioceras =

Ataxioceras Temporal range: Kimmeridgian

Extinct genus of molluscs

Ataxioceras is an extinct Ammonite cephalopod genus confined to the Upper Jurassic of Europe, included in the superfamily Perisphinctoidea.

Previously Ataxioceras was assigned to the Perisphinctidae but has now been placed in the Ataxioceratidae for which it is the type genus.

These fast-moving nektonic carnivores lived during the Jurassic period, from 155.7 to 150.8 Ma.

== Description ==
The shell is evolute, strongly ribbed and moderately umbilicate. Primary ribs, on the order of 32 -36 per whorl, are sharp and widely spaced, originate at the umbilical shoulder. Secondary ribs form about mid flank, generally by trifurcation, but sometimes quadrifurcation (splitting into threes or sometimes fours) of the primaries. The umbilicus is about 0.4 the shell diameter.

== Distribution ==
Fossils of species within this genus have been found in the Jurassic sediments in Germany, France, India and Romania.
