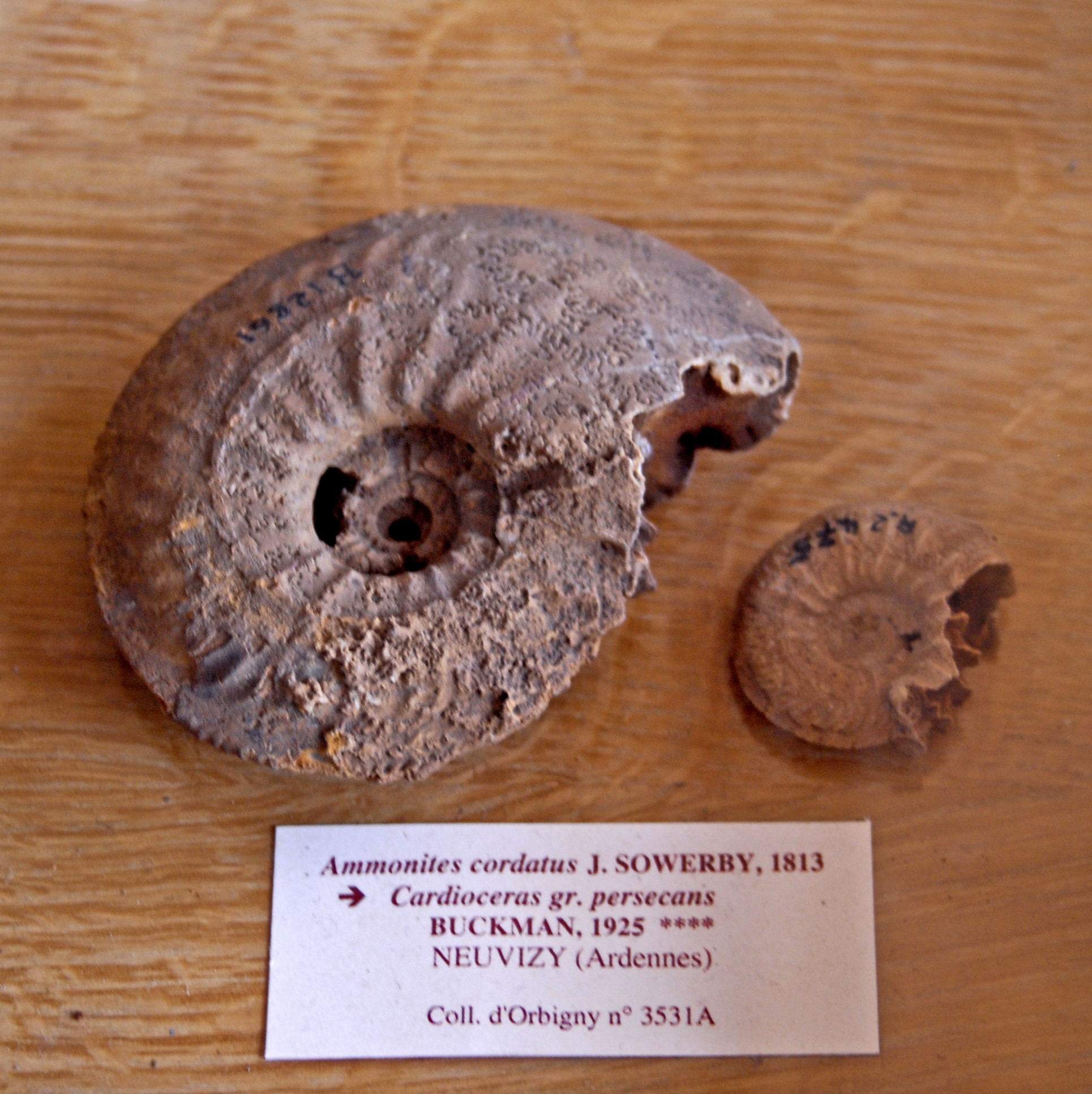
- Cardioceras persecans from France

Scientific classification
- Kingdom: Animalia
- Phylum: Mollusca
- Class: Cephalopoda
- Subclass: †Ammonoidea
- Order: †Ammonitida
- Superfamily: †Stephanoceratoidea
- Family: †Cardioceratidae; Siemiradzki, 1891

Genera
- †Cadoceras; †Quenstedtoceras; †Lamberticeras; †Cardioceras; †Amoeboceras

= Cardioceratidae =

Cardioceratidae Temporal range: Middle-Late Jurassic, 166.1–152.1 Ma Callovian-Kimmeridgian

Extinct family of ammonites

Cardioceratidae is an extinct ammonite family belonging to the superfamily Stephanoceratoidea. These fast-moving nektonic carnivores lived during the Middle-Late Jurassic periods.
