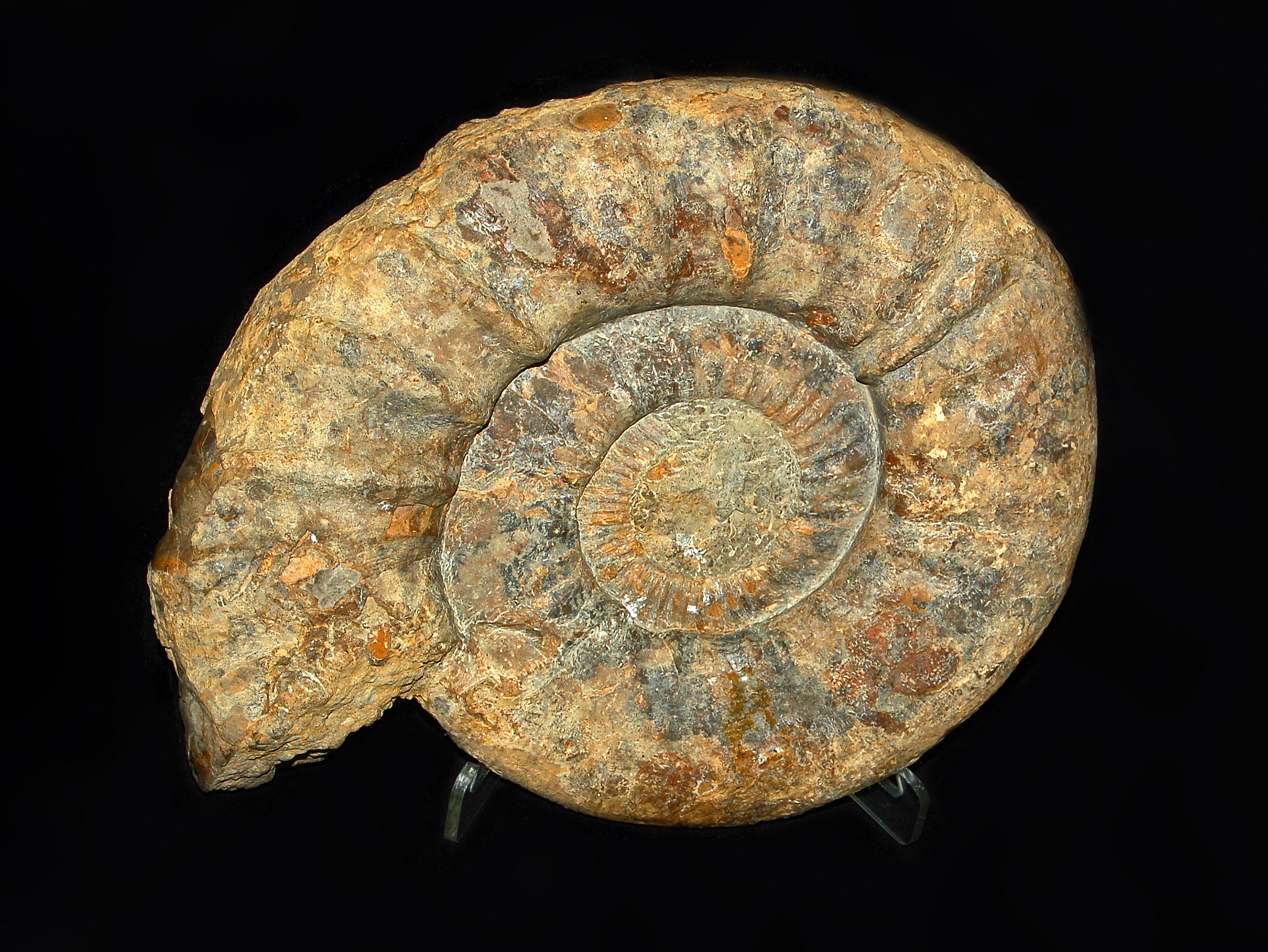
- Orthosphinctes sp., from Montejunto (Portugal), at the Museu Nacional de História Natural, Lisboa

Scientific classification
- Kingdom: Animalia
- Phylum: Mollusca
- Class: Cephalopoda
- Subclass: †Ammonoidea
- Order: †Ammonitida
- Superfamily: †Perisphinctoidea
- Family: †Perisphinctidae; Steinmann, 1890

Subfamilies
- See text

= Perisphinctidae =

Perisphinctidae Temporal range: Middle Jurassic–Upper Jurassic

Extinct family of ammonites

Perisphinctidae is a family of Middle and Upper Jurassic discoidal ammonites in the order Ammonitida. They have a shell morphology that is mostly evolute, typically with biplicate, simple, or triplicate ribbing. Large forms have simple apertures and smooth body chambers while small forms have lappets and ribbed body chambers.

The ammonites of Perisphinctidae were derived from the ancestral Stephanoceratidae in the Middle Jurassic Bajocian: perisphinctid ammonites ranged from the Bajocan until the Tithonian at the end of the Jurassic. This family forms the root stock of the Perisphinctoidea which gave rise directly or indirectly to the other perisphinctoid families.

The Treatise on Invertebrate Paleontology (Part L, 1957) includes the subfamilies Leptosphinctinae, Zigzagiceratinae, Pseudoperisphincinae, Perisphinctinae, Aataxioceratinae, Pictoniinae, Aulocostephaninae, Virgostephaninae, Dorsoplanitinae, and Virgatitinae in the Perisphictidae. Donavan et al also recognizes the subfamilies Leptosphinctinae, Zigzagiceratinae, Pseudoperisphincinae, and Perisphinctinae but leaves out the others, adding instead the Epipletoceratinae and Idoceratinae.

Epipeltoceratinae is based on Epipletoceras, a genus in the Aspidoceratidae in the Treatise, (subfamily Peltoceratinae). The Idoceratinae is based on Idoceras, a genus in the, according to the Treatise, polyphyletic Ataxioceratinae. Donovan et al separates the Aulocostephaninae, including the Pictoniinae, as the Aulacostephanidae. The subfamilies Virgostephaninae, Dorsoplanitinae, and Virgatitinae are thereby separated also as separate families all from the Upper Jurassic.
