= Xiaowa Formation =

Carnian-age geological formation in southern China

- Stratigraphic range: Carnian (~234 Ma)
- Type: Geological formation
- Underlies: Laishike Formation
- Overlies: Zhuganpo Formation

Lithology
- Primary: limestone, marl

Location
- Country: China
- Extent: Yunnan–Guizhou Plateau

The Xiaowa Formation is a Carnian-age geological formation found in southern China. It is a sequence of limestone and marls from the Carnian stage of the Triassic. Its lower section was previously known as the Wayao Formation or Wayao Member of the Falang Formation (a nomenclature still used by some authors). In 2002, the Wayao Member was renamed and raised to the Xiaowa Formation to prevent confusion with an Eocene unit of the same name. Crinoids and marine reptiles are abundant in the Xiaowa Formation, forming a lagerstätte known as the Guanling biota. Ammonoids and conodonts found in the formation constrain its age to the early Carnian. Reptiles of the Guanling biota include ichthyosaurs, thalattosaurs, placodonts, and Odontochelys (an early relative of turtles). Sedimentary events within this formation have been tied to the Carnian Pluvial Event, around 234 million years ago.

== Geology ==
The Xiaowa Formation has three members. The lower member is relatively thin but is also very fossiliferous. It begins with thick-bedded grey biomicrite (fine-grained fossiliferous limestone) interbedded with greenish shale. Bivalves and crinoid fragments are the most common fossils in the biomicrite layers, which sometimes grade upwards to dark grey laminated marls. The lower section of the lower member represents a relatively well-oxygenated pelagic environment. The lower member then transitions to a section of darker and more clastic layers indicative of anoxic conditions and reduced reef activity. Most of the articulated crinoids and vertebrate fossils of the Guanling biota hail from a dark grey micrite at the base of the lower member's upper section. This is followed by dark grey marls and black shale rich in bivalves, ammonoids, and slightly radioactive clay minerals. The lower member concludes with a sequence of dark grey laminated marls incorporating conodont fossils and silty quartz grains.

The middle member of the Xiaowa Formation is by far the thickest unit and includes thick-bedded grey limestone and marl layers interbedding with each other. Sediment deformation is characteristic of layers in this member, while fossils are represented mainly by occasional bivalves and ammonoids. The middle member represents a deep-water environment influenced by tectonic events which disturb sediment layers and create distant turbidites that periodically supply increased clastic material. The upper member is mostly dominated by laminated limestone. Though marl interbedding and fossils are practically absent, silty to sandy quartz grains are common and dominate the last few meters of the formation. This member represents a shallower ocean environment (likely raised by tectonic uplift) supplied with dust from terrestrial areas

== Paleobiota ==
The Xiaowa Formation encompasses several biostratigraphic zones. The Protrachyceras costulatum ammonoid zone of the upper Zhuganpo Formation continues into the first few meters of the Xiaowa Formation's lower member. However, the rest of the lower member (including the Guanling biota) belongs to the Trachyceras multituberculatum ammonoid zone. This unit has also been called the Austrotrachyceras triadicum zone, and is likely equivalent to the T. aon or T. aonoides zone of the western Tethys (Europe). The middle member of the Xiaowa Formation belongs to the Sirenites cf. senticosus ammonoid zone.

Color key: Taxon / Reclassified taxon / Taxon falsely reported as present / Dubious taxon or junior synonym / Ichnotaxon / Ootaxon / Morphotaxon

Notes
Uncertain or tentative taxa are in small text
~~crossed out~~ taxa are discredited.

=== Bivalves ===
Bivalves of the Xiaowa Formation
Taxon	Species	Notes
Angustella	A. sp.	A rare bakevelliid bivalve.
Asoella	A. sp.	A rare asoelliid bivalve.
Daonella
Daonella	D. bifurcata	An abundant halobiid bivalve, namesake of the H. subcomata-D.bifurcata bivalve zone.
Daonella	D. bulogensis	A halobiid bivalve.
Daonella	D. indica	A common halobiid bivalve.
Halobia
Halobia	H. brachyotis	A common halobiid bivalve.
Halobia	H. kui	A common halobiid bivalve.
Halobia	H. planicosta	A common halobiid bivalve.
Halobia	H. rugosoides	A common halobiid bivalve.
Halobia	H. subcomata	An abundant halobiid bivalve, namesake of the H. subcomata-D.bifurcata bivalve zone.
Krumbeckiella	K. sp.	A rare pergamidiid bivalve.
Plagiostoma	P. sp.	A rare limid bivalve.

=== Brachiopods ===
Brachiopods of the Xiaowa Formation
Taxon	Species	Notes
Crania?	sp.	A possible craniid brachiopod.
Similingula	S. cf. lipoldi	A rare brachiopod.

=== Cephalopods ===
Cephalopods of the Xiaowa Formation
Taxon	Species	Notes
Arctosirenites	A. canadensis	A trachyceratid ammonoid which occurs alongside T. multituberculatum.
Arctosirenites	A. columbianus	A trachyceratid ammonoid which occurs alongside T. multituberculatum.
Austrotrachyceras	A. triadicum	A trachyceratid ammonoid which occurs alongside T. multituberculatum.
Buchites	B cf. aldrovandii	A buchitid ammonoid which occurs in the S. cf. senticosus zone.
Clionites	C. cf. zeilleri	A clionitid ammonoid which occurs in the P. costulatum zone.
Enoploceras?	E. sp.	A rare tainoceratid nautiloid tentatively referred to Enoploceras.
Guanlingoceras	G. guanlingensis	A trachyceratid ammonoid
Hauerites	H. cf. himalayanus	A rare ammonoid which occurs in the T. multituberculatum zone.
Paratrachyceras	P. cf. hoffmani	A trachyceratid ammonoid which occurs in the T. multituberculatum zone.
Protrachyceras	P. costulatum	A trachyceratid ammonoid, namesake of the P. costulatum zone
Protrachyceras	P. deprati	A trachyceratid ammonoid which occurs in the oldest part of the Lower Member.
Protrachyceras	P. douvillei	A trachyceratid ammonoid which occurs in the T. multituberculatum zone.
Protrachyceras	P. cf. douvillei	A trachyceratid ammonoid which occurs in the P. costulatum zone.
Protrachyceras	P. ladinum	A trachyceratid ammonoid which occurs in the T. multituberculatum zone.
Protrachyceras	P. longiangense	A trachyceratid ammonoid which occurs in the T. multituberculatum zone.
Protrachyceras	P. sp	An unnamed species of trachyceratid ammonoid which occurs in the S. cf. senticosus zone.
Simonyceras	S. simonyi	A ussuritid ammonoid.
Sirenites	S. cf. senticosus	A trachyceratid ammonoid, namesake of the S. cf. senticosus zone.
Sibyllites	S. cf. tenuispinosus	A tropitid ammonoid which occurs in the S. cf. senticosus zone.
Sibyllites	S. sp.	An unnamed species of tropitid ammonoid which occurs in the S. cf. senticosus zone.
Trachyceras	T. aonoides	A trachyceratid ammonoid, namesake of the T. aonoides zone.
Trachyceras	T. cf. aon	A trachyceratid ammonoid which occurs in the T. multituberculatum zone.
Trachyceras	T. multituberculatum	An abundant trachyceratid ammonoid, namesake of the T. multituberculatum zone.
Trachyceras	T. sinensis	A trachyceratid ammonoid which occurs in the T. multituberculatum zone.
Trachyceras	T. uraniae	A trachyceratid ammonoid which occurs alongside T. multituberculatum.
Trachyceras	T. sp. A	An unnamed species of trachyceratid ammonoid similar to Protrachyceras douvillei.
Trachyceras	T. sp. B	An unnamed species of trachyceratid ammonoid similar to Protrachyceras deprati.
Trachyceras	T. sp.	An unnamed species of trachyceratid ammonoid which occurs in the S. cf. senticosus zone.
Yakutosirenites	Y. mulanae	An early ammonite

=== Conodonts ===
Conodonts of the Xiaowa Formation
Taxon	Species
Metapolygnathus / Paragondolella / Quadralella	auriformis
Metapolygnathus / Paragondolella / Quadralella	carpathica
Metapolygnathus / Paragondolella / Quadralella	foliata foliata
Metapolygnathus / Paragondolella / Quadralella	foliata inclinata
Metapolygnathus / Paragondolella / Quadralella	jiangyouensis
Metapolygnathus / Paragondolella / Quadralella	maantangensis
Metapolygnathus / Paragondolella / Quadralella	navicula navicula
Metapolygnathus / Paragondolella / Quadralella	nodosus
Metapolygnathus / Paragondolella / Quadralella	polygnathiformis
Metapolygnathus / Paragondolella / Quadralella	prelindae
Metapolygnathus / Paragondolella / Quadralella	robusta
Metapolygnathus / Paragondolella / Quadralella	tadpole
Metapolygnathus / Paragondolella / Quadralella	wayaoensis
Metapolygnathus / Paragondolella / Quadralella	xinpuensis

=== Echinoderms ===
Echinoderms of the Xiaowa Formation
Taxon	Species	Notes
Calclamnidae	indet.	Holothurian (sea cucumber) ossicles.
Osteocrinus	O. cf. spinosus	A free-swimming roveacrinid crinoid.
Osteocrinus	O. cf. virgatus	A free-swimming roveacrinid crinoid.
Traumatocrinus	T. cf. lipoldi	An abundant traumatocrinid crinoid. Pseudoplanktonic, forming colonies on floating driftwood.

=== Fish ===
Fish of the Xiaowa Formation
Taxon	Species	Notes
Annulicorona	A. pyramidalis	Elasmobranch denticles
Asialepidotus	A. sp.	A halecomorph holostean
Birgeria
Birgeria	B. guizhouensis	A large predatory birgeriid
Birgeria	B. sp.	A large predatory birgeriid
Colobodus	C. sp.	A colobodontid perleidiform
Guizhoucoelacanthus	G. guanlingensis	A whiteiid coelacanth
Guizhoueugnathus	G. largus	A eugnathid holostean
Parvicorona	P. dacrysulca	Elasmobranch denticles
Peltopleurus	P. brachycephalus	A peltopleurid holostean
Pholidopleurus	P. xiaowaensis	A pholidopleurid holostean
Saurichthys	S. taotie	A saurichthyid saurichthyiform

=== Amphibians ===
Amphibians of the Xiaowa Formation
Taxon	Species	Notes
Gerrothorax	G. maritimus	A plagiosaurid temnospondyl.

=== Reptiles ===
Reptiles of the Xiaowa Formation
Taxon	Species	Notes
Anshunsaurus	A. huangguoshuensis	A large askeptosauroid thalattosaur
"Callawayia"	"C." wolonggangensis	A shastasaurid ichthyosaur. Originally referred to Callawayia, but likely unrelated.
Concavispina	C. biseridens	A large thalattosauroid thalattosaur
Cyamodus	C. orientalis	A cyamodontid placodont
"Cymbospondylus"	"C." asiaticus	A junior synonym of Guizhouichthyosaurus tangae, unrelated to Cymbospondylus
Eorhynchochelys	E. sinensis	A large aquatic pantestudine (early turtle relative)
Guanlingsaurus	G. liangae	A giant shastasaurid ichthyosaur
Guizhouichthyosaurus	G. tangae	A common shastasaurid ichthyosaur
Miodentosaurus	M. brevis	A large askeptosauroid thalattosaur
Neosinasaurus	N. hoangi	A poorly-known marine reptile. Originally described as a pachypleurosaur, though may be a thalattosaur instead.
Odontochelys	O. semitestacea	An aquatic pantestudine
Panjiangsaurus	P. epicharis	A junior synonym of Guizhouichthyosaurus tangae
Psephochelys	P. polyosteoderma	A placochelyid placodont
Qianichthyosaurus	Q. zhoui	A common small toretocnemid ichthyosaur
Sinocyamodus	S. xinpuensis	A cyamodontoid placodont
Typicusichthyosaurus	T. tsaihuae	Likely a junior synonym of Guanlingsaurus lingae
Wayaosaurus	W. bellus	A poorly-known marine reptile. Originally described as a pachypleurosaur, though may be a thalattosaur instead.
Wayaosaurus	W. geei	A poorly-known marine reptile. Originally described as a pachypleurosaur, though may be a thalattosaur instead.
Xinpusaurus	X. bamaolinensis	A thalattosauroid thalattosaur, possibly an invalid synonym of another Xinpusaurus species
Xinpusaurus	X. kohi	A thalattosauroid thalattosaur
Xinpusaurus	X. suni	A thalattosauroid thalattosaur
