= Frankites =

Frankites Temporal range: Triassic

Scientific classification
- Domain: Eukaryota
- Kingdom: Animalia
- Phylum: Mollusca
- Class: Cephalopoda
- Subclass: †Ammonoidea
- Order: †Ceratitida
- Family: †Trachyceratidae
- Subfamily: †Anolcitinae
- Genus: †Frankites; Tozer, 1971

Genus of molluscs (fossil)

Frankites is an extinct genus of cephalopods from the Triassic period included in the Trachyceratidae, a family of mostly evolute ammonites, coiled so as all whorls are showing, and commonly ornamented with flexious, tuberculate ribs. Related genera include Anolcites, Daxatina, and Trachyceras.

Frankites has been found in Nevada, British Columbia, China, India, and Italy with a variety of other ceratitid ammonites.
