= Anderssonoceras =

Anderssonoceras Temporal range: U Permian

Conservation status
- Extinct

Scientific classification
- Kingdom: Animalia
- Phylum: Mollusca
- Class: Cephalopoda
- Subclass: †Ammonoidea
- Order: †Ceratitida
- Family: †Anderssonoceratidae
- Genus: †Anderssonoceras

Genus of molluscs (fossil)

Anderssonoceras is a genus of small, smooth ammonites with a flared umbilical shoulder, like Prototoceras, assigned to the ceratitid family Anderssonoceratidae as the type, but once included in the Otoceratidae.

Anderssonoceras comes from the Upper Permian of China.
