= Vredenburgites =

Vredenburgites Temporal range: Upper Triassic

Scientific classification
- Domain: Eukaryota
- Kingdom: Animalia
- Phylum: Mollusca
- Class: Cephalopoda
- Subclass: †Ammonoidea
- Order: †Ceratitida
- Family: †Trachyceratidae
- Subfamily: †Sirenitinae
- Genus: †Vredenburgites; Diener 1916

Genus of molluscs (fossil)

Vredenburgites is a genus of ceratitids in the family Trachyceratidae. Its shell has numerous, thin, flexious ribs.

Related genera include Anasirenites, Sirenites, and Wangoceras.
