= Guanlingoceras =

Guanlingoceras Temporal range: Carnian, 237–227 Ma

Scientific classification
- Kingdom: Animalia
- Phylum: Mollusca
- Class: Cephalopoda
- Subclass: †Ammonoidea
- Order: †Ceratitida
- Family: †Trachyceratidae
- Subfamily: †Sirenitinae
- Genus: †Guanlingoceras; Mao et al., 2024

Type species
- †G. guanlingensis Mao et al., 2024

Extinct genus of trachyceratid ammonites

Guanlingoceras (meaning "Guanling Horn") is a genus of trachyceratid ammonite from the Triassic Xiaowa Formation in Guizhou, China. The type and only species is Guanlingoceras guanlingensis, known from eight specimens comprising various well preserved shells and incomplete shells.

== Description ==
Guanlingoceras is known from eight specimens which were referred to G.. guanlingensis by Mao et al., (2024). The holotype, GMG20230804002 consists of a partial shell. The other seven paratypes consist of various specimens of different sizes and levels of completeness.

== Etymology ==
The generic name, Guanlingoceras, is derived frow Guanling County of which the type locality is close to, combined with the Latin suffix '-ceras' which is common in shelled cephalopods. The word itself refers to a horn or anything made out of horn such as the shell of an ammonite. The specific name, guanlingensis, states where the species comes from, the Greek suffix '-ensis' denoting where something comes from geographically.

== Classification ==
Mao et al., (2024) determined Guanlingoceras to be in the sirenitid family inside Ceratitida due to similarities between both Yakutosirenites and Neosirenites. A "meticulous comparison [which] (revealed) distinctions from other genera of ammonoids."
