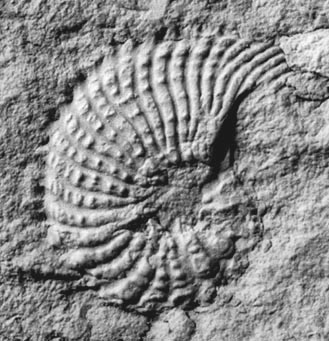
- Brotheotrachyceras brotheus

Scientific classification
- Domain: Eukaryota
- Kingdom: Animalia
- Phylum: Mollusca
- Class: Cephalopoda
- Subclass: †Ammonoidea
- Order: †Ceratitida
- Family: †Trachyceratidae
- Genus: †Brotheotrachyceras; Urlichs 1994

Species
- B. brotheus Munster 1834; B. difforme Munster 1834

= Brotheotrachyceras =

Brotheotrachyceras Temporal range: Carnian

Genus of molluscs (fossil)

Brotheotrachyceras is a genus of ammonite cephalopod belonging to the order Ceratitida. It was living during the Carnian age of the Late Triassic Epoch.

== Classification ==
The family to which Brotheotrachyceras belongs, Trachyceratidae, has more or less involute, highly ornamented shells and ceratitic to ammonitic sutures.

== Bibliography ==
- E. von Mojsisovics. 1882. Die Cephalopoden der Mediterranen Triasprovinz. Abhandlungen der Kaiserlich-Königlichen Geologischen Reichsanstalt 10:1-322
- Arkell, W.J.; Kummel, B.; Wright, C.W. (1957). Mesozoic Ammonoidea. Treatise on Invertebrate Paleontology, Part L, Mollusca 4. Lawrence, Kansas: Geological Society of America and University of Kansas Press.
