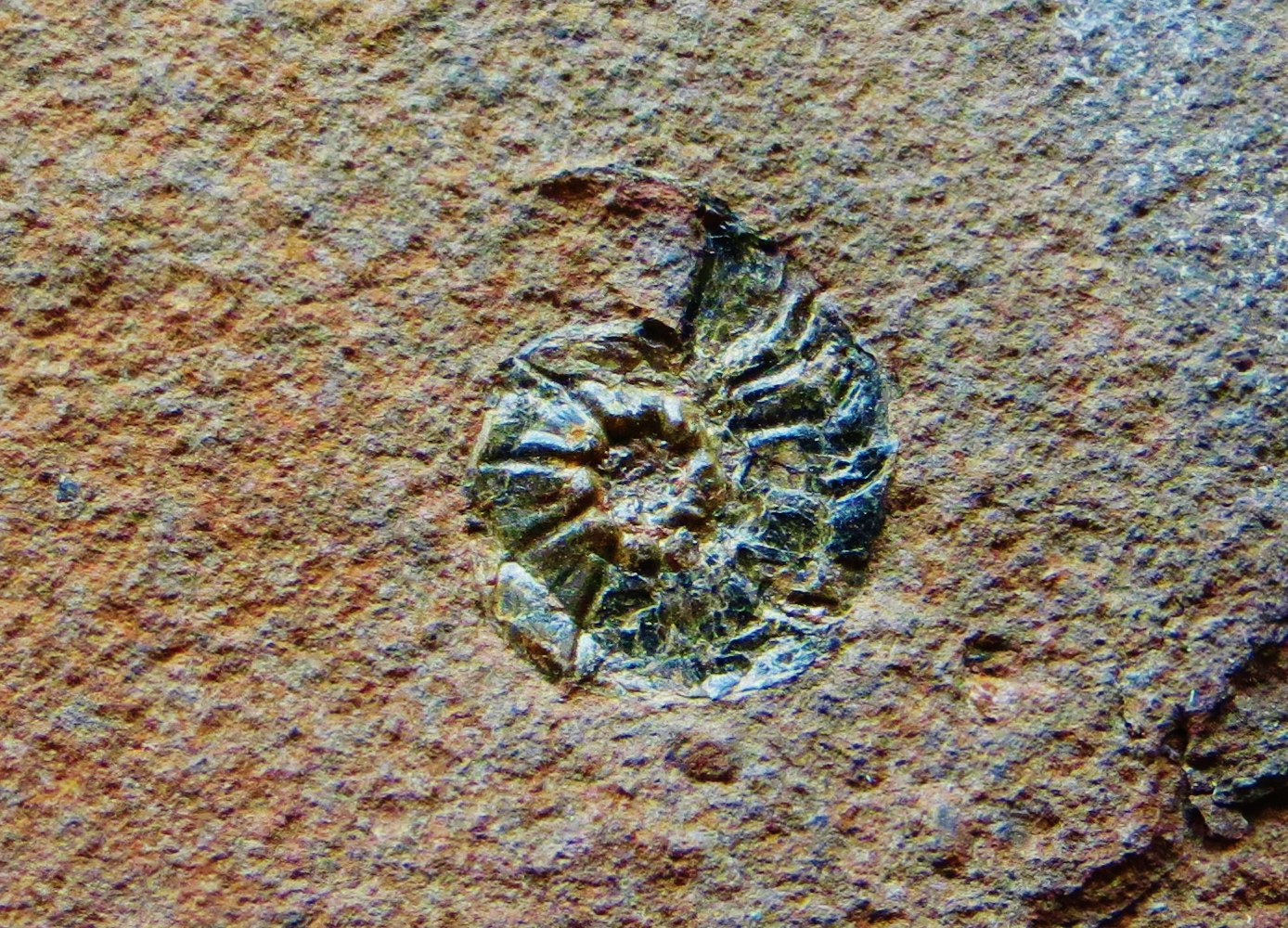

Scientific classification
- Domain: Eukaryota
- Kingdom: Animalia
- Phylum: Mollusca
- Class: Cephalopoda
- Subclass: †Ammonoidea
- Order: †Ceratitida
- Family: †Trachyceratidae
- Subfamily: †Anolcitinae
- Genus: †Asklepioceras; Renz, 1910

Species
- A. segmentatum Mojsisovics 1893; A. squammatum Arthaber 1915; A. laurenci McLearn 1940; A. exilis Tozer 1994; A. altilis Tozer 1994

Synonyms
- A. mahaffii McLearn 1947

= Asklepioceras =

Asklepioceras Temporal range: Middle-Upper Triassic (Ladinian-Carnian)

Genus of molluscs (fossil)

Asklepioceras is a genus in the Ceratitid family Arpaditidae from the Middle and Upper Triassic (Ladinian and Carnian stages) of Italy, Romania, Turkey, and British Columbia (Canada).

== History ==
The type species, Asklepioceras segmentatum was originally named as Arpadites segmentatus by Renz, 1910. In 1951, it was assigned to Asklepioceras by L. F. Spath. Founded in British Columbia in 1947, A. mahaffii was later synonymised with A. laurenci. Two more species, A. exilis and A. altilis, both from Canada, were described in 1994 by E. T. Tozer.

== Description ==
The genus is characterized by evolute to involute, discoidal to subglobular shells with a median (ventral) furrow not bordered by keels (in contrast to Dittmarites in which it is) and simple ceratitic sutures. (Arkell et al. 1962, L162) The genotype Asklepioceras segmentatus Renz, 1910, based on Arpadites (Dittmarites) segmentatus Mojsisovics, 1893. is found in the Carnian of the Alps.
