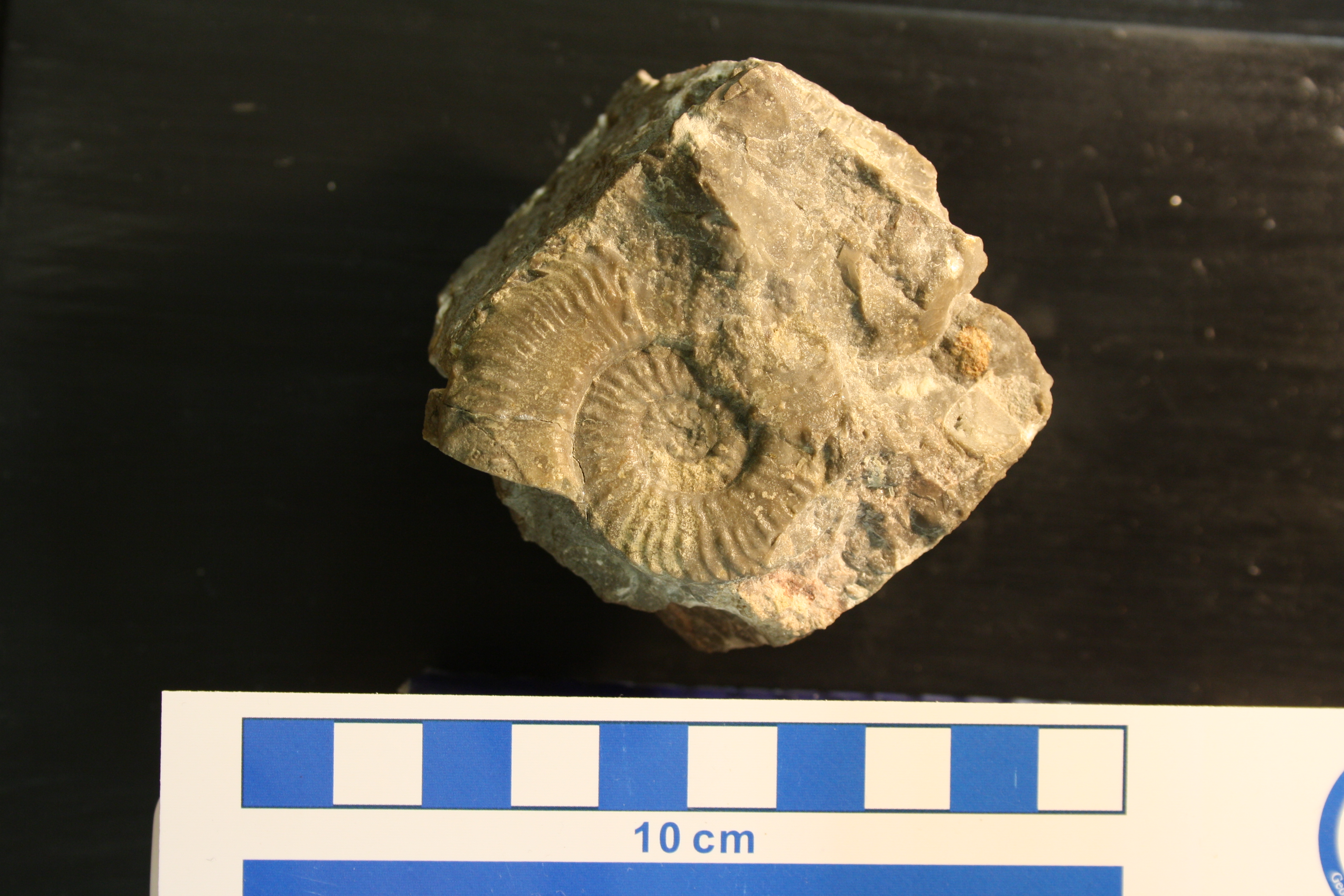
- Arpadites szaboi

Scientific classification
- Kingdom: Animalia
- Phylum: Mollusca
- Class: Cephalopoda
- Subclass: †Ammonoidea
- Order: †Ceratitida
- Family: †Trachyceratidae
- Subfamily: †Arpaditinae
- Genus: †Arpadites; Mojsisovic, 1879

= Arpadites =

Arpadites Temporal range: Middle-Upper Triassic (Ladinian-Carnian)

Genus of molluscs (fossil)

Arpadites is a genus of ceratitids in the family Trachyceratidae from the Middle and Upper Triassic (Ladinian and Carnian stages) of Nevada (United States), Alps, Italy, Balkans, Himalayas, and Japan. (Arkel et al. 1962, L162)

The genotype Arpadites arpadis came from the upper Middle Triassic (Ladinian) of the Alps in Europe.

== Description ==
Arpadites, named by Mojsisovics, 1879, is characterized by a compressed, evolute, discoidal shell with radial or faintly sigmoidal ribs; smooth, continuous keels; umbilical tubercles, with or without lateral and ventrolateral tubercles as well; and ceratitic sutures with two lateral lobes (on either side).

== Gallery ==
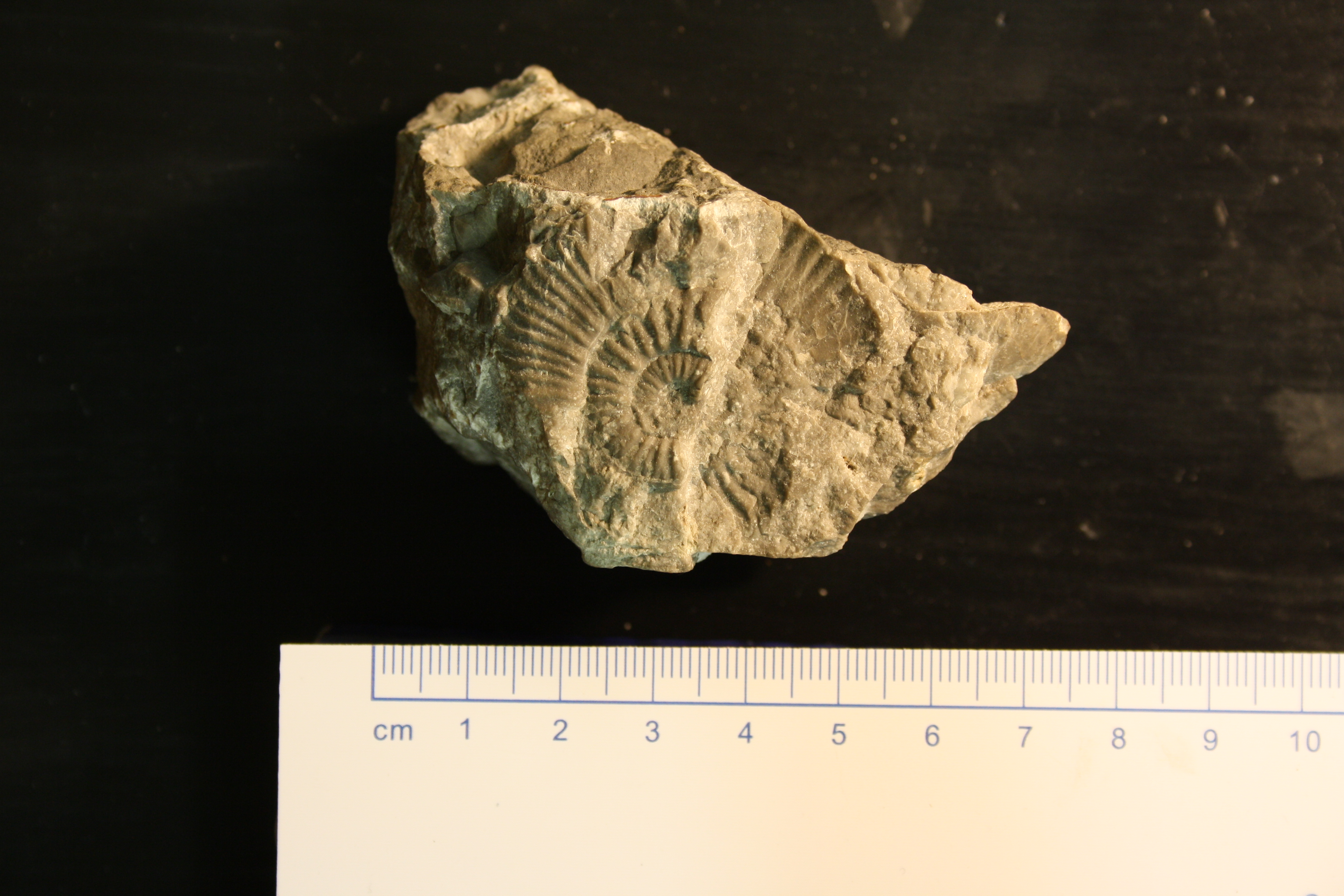
Arpadites arpadis

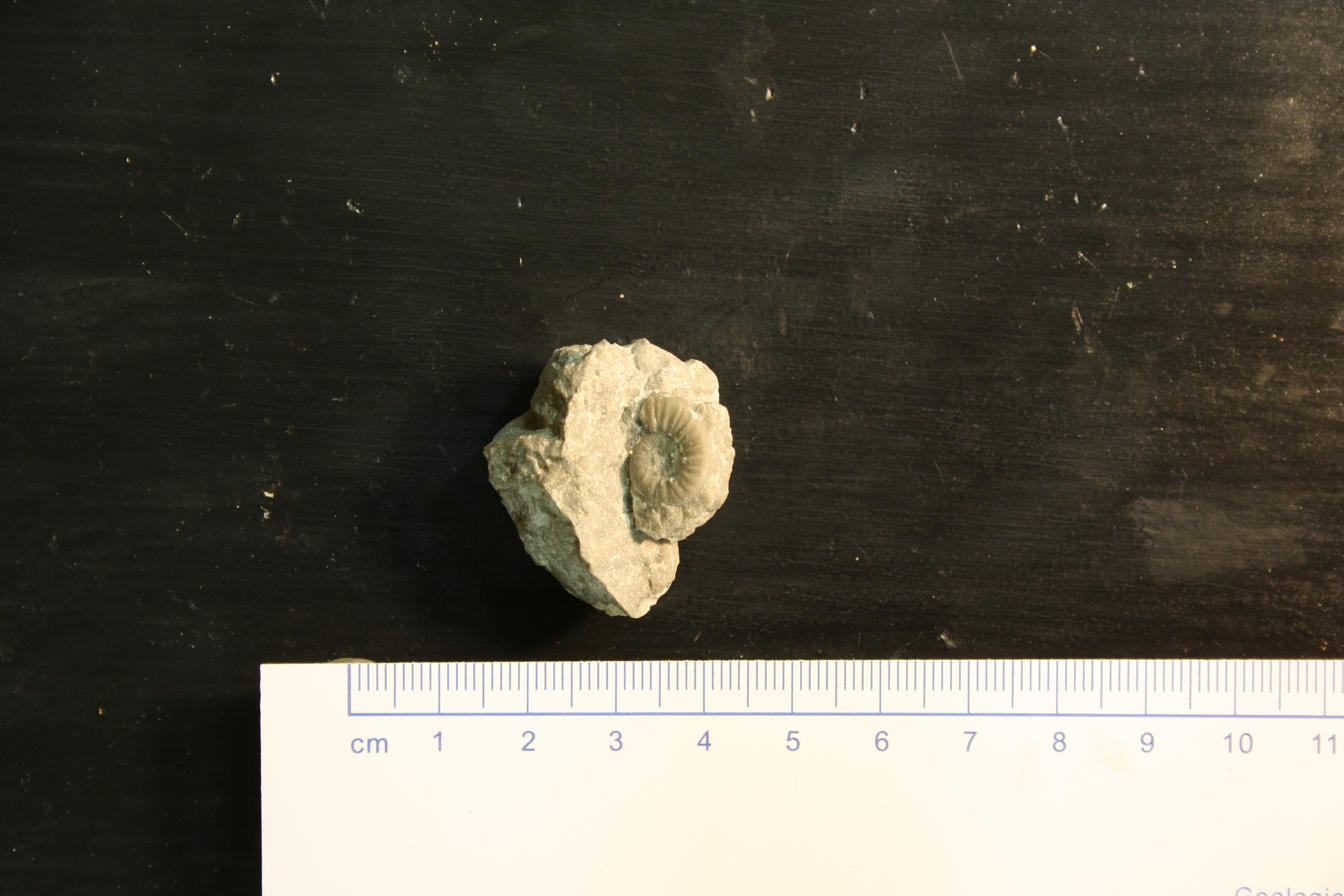
Arpadites szaboi

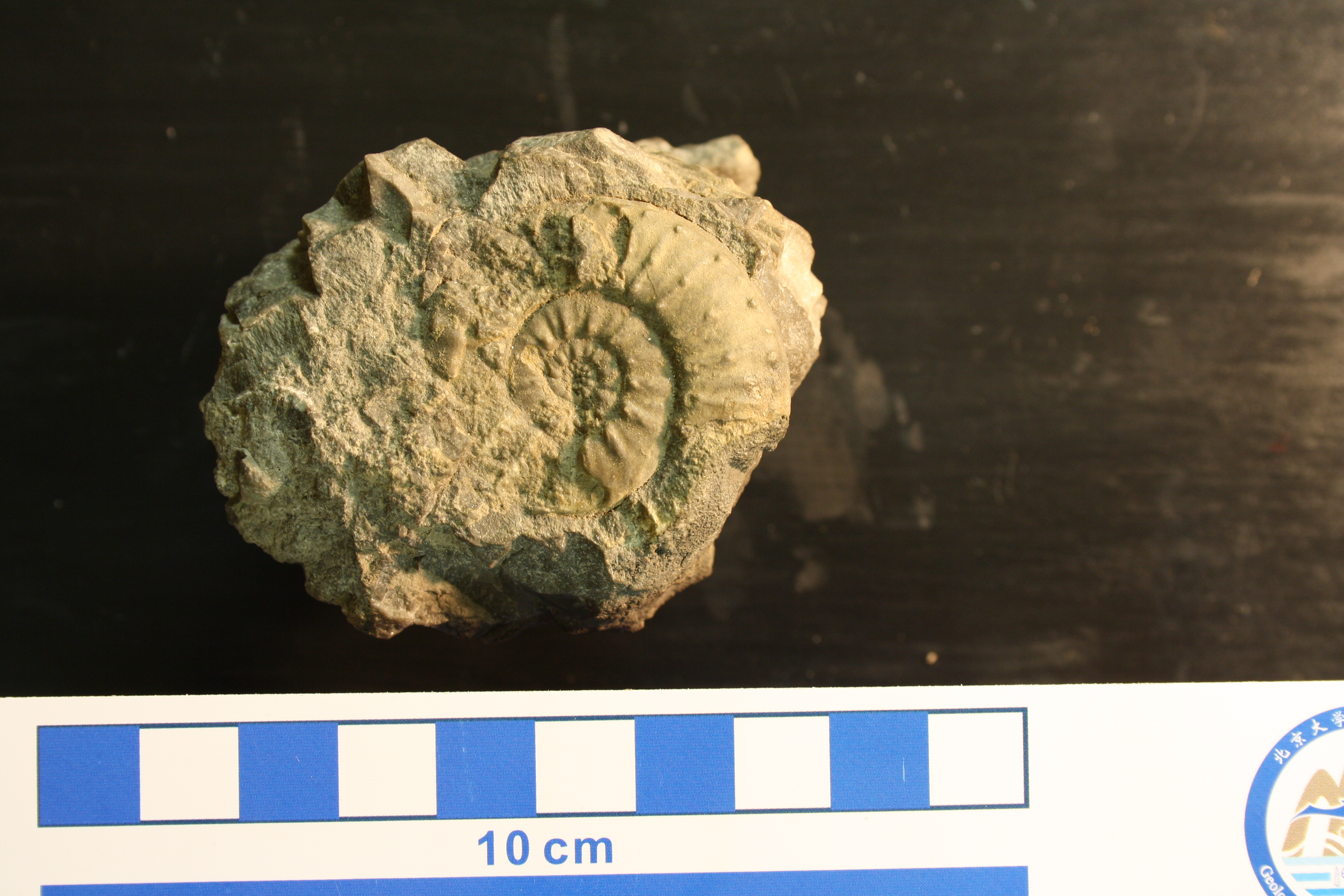
Arpadites telleri
