= Pseudosirenites =

Scientific classification
- Domain: Eukaryota
- Kingdom: Animalia
- Phylum: Mollusca
- Class: Cephalopoda
- Subclass: †Ammonoidea
- Order: †Ceratitida
- Family: †Trachyceratidae
- Subfamily: †Sirenitinae
- Genus: †Pseudosirenites; Arthaber, 1911

Genus of molluscs (fossil)

Pseudosirenites is a genus of Upper Triassic ammonites belonging to the ceratitid family Trachyceratidae, like Sirenites, but with a narrow outer rim (venter) that has a nodose keel on either side.
