= Boreotrachyceras =

Boreotrachyceras Temporal range: Carnian

Scientific classification
- Domain: Eukaryota
- Kingdom: Animalia
- Phylum: Mollusca
- Class: Cephalopoda
- Subclass: †Ammonoidea
- Order: †Ceratitida
- Family: †Trachyceratidae
- Genus: †Boreotrachyceras; Konstantinov 2012

Genus of molluscs (fossil)

Boreotrachyceras is an extinct genus of ammonite cephalopod, belonging to the order Ceratitida.

The family to which Boreotrachyceras belongs, Trachyceratidae, has more or less involute, highly ornamented shells and ceratitic to ammonitic sutures.

== Bibliography ==
- Arkell, W.J.; Kummel, B.; Wright, C.W. (1957). Mesozoic Ammonoidea. Treatise on Invertebrate Paleontology, Part L, Mollusca 4. Lawrence, Kansas: Geological Society of America and University of Kansas Press.
