= Argolites =

Argolites Temporal range: Anisian-Ladinian

Scientific classification
- Kingdom: Animalia
- Phylum: Mollusca
- Class: Cephalopoda
- Subclass: †Ammonoidea
- Order: †Ceratitida
- Family: †Trachyceratidae
- Subfamily: †Arpaditinae
- Genus: †Argolites; Renz, 1939

Genus of molluscs (fossil)

Argolites is an extinct genus of cephalopods belonging to the Ammonite subclass.Fossils of this Genus have been found in Italy, Greece, Croatia, and Hungary.

== Species ==
- Argolites mojsisovicsi De Lorenzo, 1896 (Type)
- Argolites arietiformis De Toni, 1913
- Argolites arpaditoides von Mojsisovics, 1882
- Argolites celtitoides Airaghi, 1902
- Argolites fortis Fantini Sestini, 1994
- Argolites nodosus Vörös in Vörös et al., 2025
- Argolites paronai Mariani, 1902
- Argolites trinodosus Balini et al., 2006
