= Neoprotrachyceras =

Neoprotrachyceras Temporal range: Carnian

Scientific classification
- Domain: Eukaryota
- Kingdom: Animalia
- Phylum: Mollusca
- Class: Cephalopoda
- Subclass: †Ammonoidea
- Order: †Ceratitida
- Family: †Trachyceratidae
- Subfamily: †Trachyceratinae
- Genus: †Neoprotrachyceras; Krystyn 1978

Genus of molluscs (fossil)

Neoprotrachyceras is a genus belonging to the extinct subclass of cephalopods known as ammonites. Specifically it belongs in the order Ceratitida.

The family to which Neoprotrachyceras belongs, the Trachyceratidae, has more or less involute, highly ornamented shells and ceratitic to ammonitic sutures.
