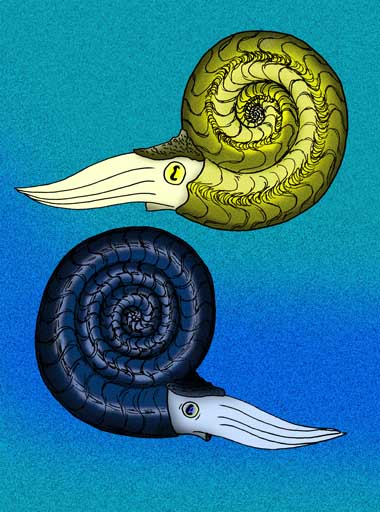
- Hongshuiheites (top), Etoushanoceras (below)

Scientific classification
- Kingdom: Animalia
- Phylum: Mollusca
- Class: Cephalopoda
- Subclass: †Ammonoidea
- Order: †Ceratitida
- Superfamily: †Otoceratoidea
- Family: †Etoushanocertidae; Yang & Xiong, 1990

Genera
- Etoushanoceras; Hongshuiheites

= Etoushanocertidae =

Etoushanocertidae Temporal range: Wuchiapingian 258–256 Ma

Family of molluscs (fossil)

Etoushanocertidae is an extinct family of ceratitid ammonite cephalopods that were restricted to marine strata in Late Permian China.
