= Anasirenites =

Anasirenites Temporal range: Upper Triassic

Scientific classification
- Domain: Eukaryota
- Kingdom: Animalia
- Phylum: Mollusca
- Class: Cephalopoda
- Subclass: †Ammonoidea
- Order: †Ceratitida
- Family: †Trachyceratidae
- Subfamily: †Sirenitinae
- Genus: †Anasirenites; Mojsisovics, 1893

Genus of molluscs (fossil)

Anasirenites is a genus of extinct ammonoid cephalopods within the family Trachyceratidae which is part of the ceratitid superfamily Clydonitaceae; sometimes considered a subgenus of Sirenites. Anasirenites is characterized by a ventral furrow bordered on either side by a continuous keel. The shell, as for Sirenites, is compressed with whorls flattened-convex on the sides. Sigmoidal ribs on the flanks bifurcate near the ventro-lateral shoulder on tubercles and project sharply adorally. Whorl sides are tuberculate with tubercles arranged in spiral lines. The suture is ammonitic. Anasirenites, first described by Mojsisovics in 1893 is known from the Upper Triassic of the Alps, Sicily, and the Himalaya.
