= Alloptychites =

Scientific classification
- Kingdom: Animalia
- Phylum: Mollusca
- Class: Cephalopoda
- Subclass: †Ammonoidea
- Order: †Ceratitida
- Family: †Isculitidae
- Genus: †Alloptychites; Spath, 1951

Genus of molluscs (fossil)

Alloptychites is an extinct genus of cephalopods belonging to the ammonite subclass.
