= Hannaoceras =

Hannaoceras Temporal range: Carnian

Scientific classification
- Domain: Eukaryota
- Kingdom: Animalia
- Phylum: Mollusca
- Class: Cephalopoda
- Subclass: †Ammonoidea
- Order: †Ceratitida
- Family: †Trachyceratidae
- Genus: †Hannaoceras; Tomlin 1931

Genus of molluscs (fossil)

Hannaoceras is a genus belonging to the extinct subclass of cephalopods known as ammonites. Specifically it belongs in the order Ceratitida.

The family to which Hannaoceras belongs, the Trachyceratidae, has more or less involute, highly ornamented shells and ceratitic to ammonitic sutures. Age range: 232.0 to 221.5 Ma.
