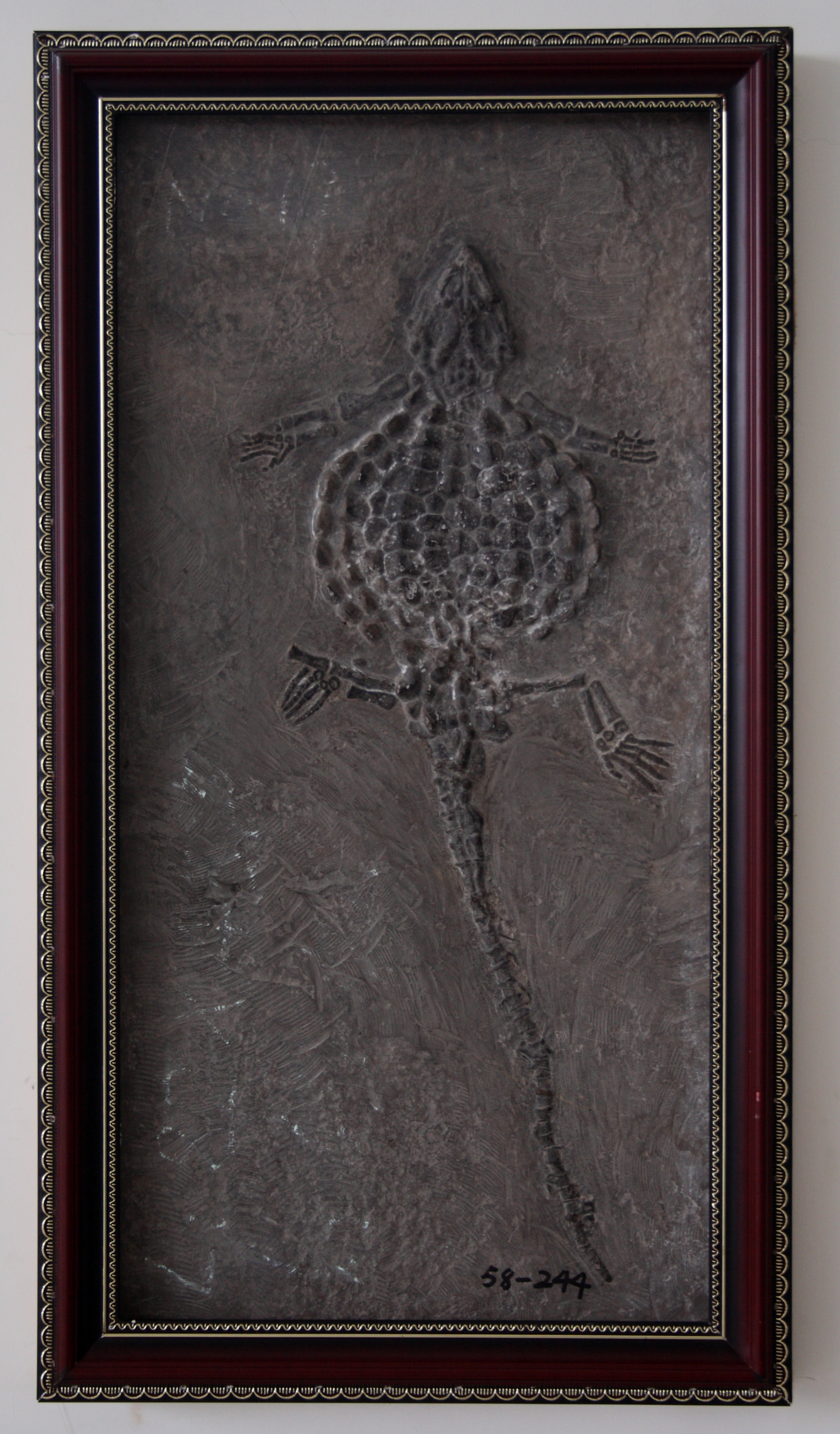
- Fossil of Sinocyamodus xinpuensis in the Shandong Tianyu Museum of Nature

Scientific classification
- Kingdom: Animalia
- Phylum: Chordata
- Class: Reptilia
- Superorder: †Sauropterygia
- Order: †Placodontia
- Superfamily: †Cyamodontoidea
- Genus: †Sinocyamodus; Li 2000

Type species
- †Sinocyamodus xinpuensis Li 2000

= Sinocyamodus =

Sinocyamodus Temporal range: Late Triassic (Tuvalian) ~232–222 Ma

Extinct genus of reptiles

Sinocyamodus is an extinct genus of placodont reptile from the Late Triassic (Tuvalian) Xiaowa Formation of China. Only one species, Sinocyamodus xinpuensis, is currently assigned to this genus. This genus was the first placodont to be discovered in the eastern Tethys, overthrowing traditional views that the group was restricted to the western Tethys.

The first adult specimen of this genus was reported in 2018, and showed a number of morphological differences with previously discovered sub-adult material indicating developmental changes with age.

== Gallery ==
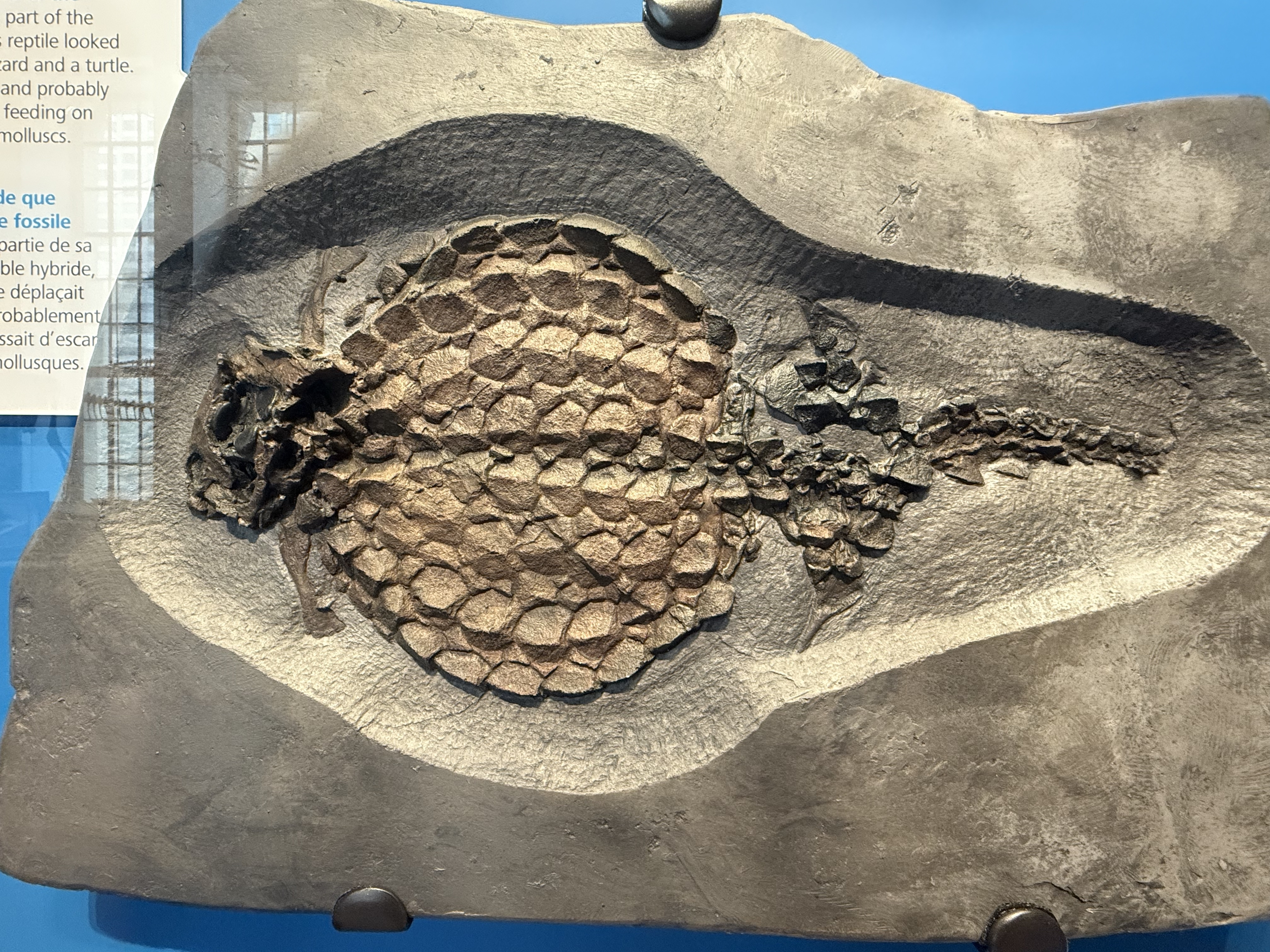
Cast, at the Royal Ontario Museum

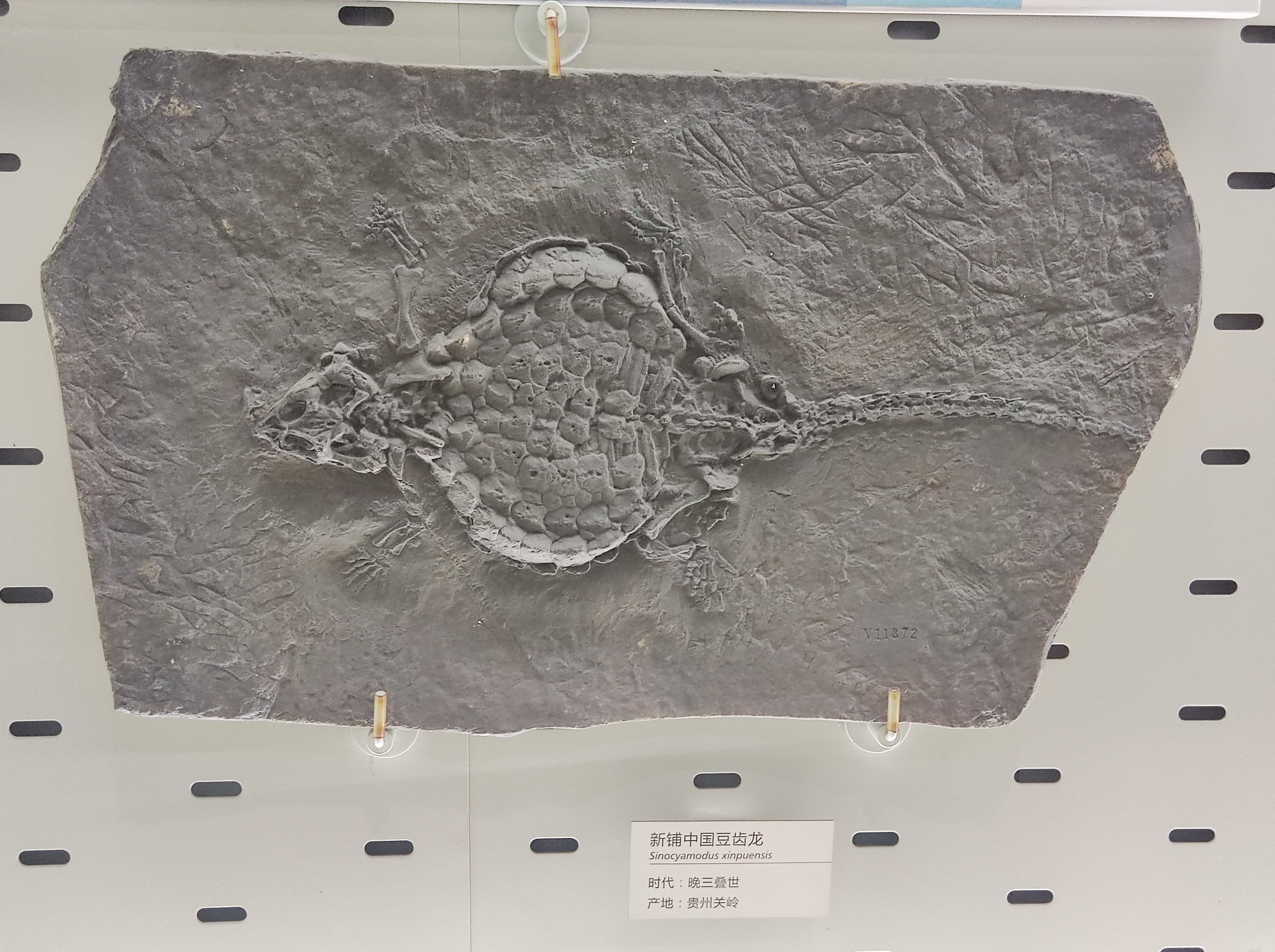
At the Zhejiang Museum of Natural History
