= Anotoceras =

Anotoceras Temporal range: Late Triassic

Scientific classification
- Domain: Eukaryota
- Kingdom: Animalia
- Phylum: Mollusca
- Class: Cephalopoda
- Subclass: †Ammonoidea
- Order: †Ceratitida
- Family: †Otoceratidae
- Genus: †Anotoceras; Hyatt 1900

Genus of molluscs (fossil)

Anotoceras is a genus of smooth shelled, discoidal ammonites with a depressed, subtrigonal whorl section and ceratitic sutures included in the ceratitid family Otoceratidae.

Anotoceras comes from the Lower Triassic of the Himalaya
