= Glyphidites =

Glyphidites Temporal range: Norian

Scientific classification
- Kingdom: Animalia
- Phylum: Mollusca
- Class: Cephalopoda
- Subclass: †Ammonoidea
- Order: †Ceratitida
- Family: †Thisbitidae
- Genus: †Glyphidites; Mojsisovics, 1893

Genus of molluscs (fossil)

Glyphidites is a genus of Late Triassic ceratitids included in the family Thisbitidae, characterized by an essentially involute shell with a compressed whorl section, nearly straight sides and arched venter, bearing a serrated keel and granular sinuous ribs.

Glyphidites comes from the Upper Triassic (Norian) of Sicily and the Alps. Related genera include Thisbites and Jellinekites. The Thisbitidae, to which it is assigned, has been removed from the Clydonitaceae in Akell et al., 1957 to the Tropitaceae in E.T. Tozer, 1981
