= Okhototrachyceras =

Okhototrachyceras Temporal range: Carnian

Scientific classification
- Domain: Eukaryota
- Kingdom: Animalia
- Phylum: Mollusca
- Class: Cephalopoda
- Subclass: †Ammonoidea
- Order: †Ceratitida
- Family: †Trachyceratidae
- Genus: †Okhototrachyceras; Konstantinov 2012

Genus of molluscs (fossil)

Okhototrachyceras is a genus belonging to the extinct subclass of cephalopods known as ammonites. Specifically it belongs in the order Ceratitida.

The family to which Okhototrachyceras belongs, the Trachyceratidae, has more or less involute, highly ornamented shells and ceratitic to ammonitic sutures.
