= Anfaceras =

Scientific classification
- Kingdom: Animalia
- Phylum: Mollusca
- Class: Cephalopoda
- Subclass: †Ammonoidea
- Order: †Ceratitida
- Family: †incertae sedis
- Genus: †Anfaceras

Genus of molluscs (fossil)

Anfaceras is an extinct genus of cephalopods belonging to the Ammonite subclass. As of early 2025, it is awaiting allocation within the family Ceratitida.
