= Otoceratina =

Scientific classification
- Domain: Eukaryota
- Kingdom: Animalia
- Phylum: Mollusca
- Class: Cephalopoda
- Subclass: †Ammonoidea
- Order: †Ceratitida
- Suborder: †Otoceratina

Superfamilies
- Otoceratoidea

Extinct suborder of molluscs

Otoceratina is an extinct suborder of cephalopods belonging to the Ammonite subclass in the order Ceratitida.
