= Annulicorona =

Annulicorona Temporal range: Carnian

Scientific classification
- Domain: Eukaryota
- Kingdom: Animalia
- Phylum: Chordata
- Class: Chondrichthyes
- Genus: †Annulicorona; Chen & Cuny, 2003

Extinct Genus of Cartilaginous fish

Annulicorona is an extinct genus of cartilaginous fish from Upper Triassic epoch of the Triassic period. Its name comes from the Latin Annulis meaning ring and Corona meaning crown, referring to the ring around the base of the crown of dermal denticles. It is known from the isolated dermal denticles of a single species, A. pyramidalis. The name refers to the roughly pyramid-shaped crown of the referred dermal denticles. It is known from two Xiaowa Formation sites in Guizhou, China. They are middle Carnian in age. Its affinities are uncertain due to the fragmentary nature of known remains.
