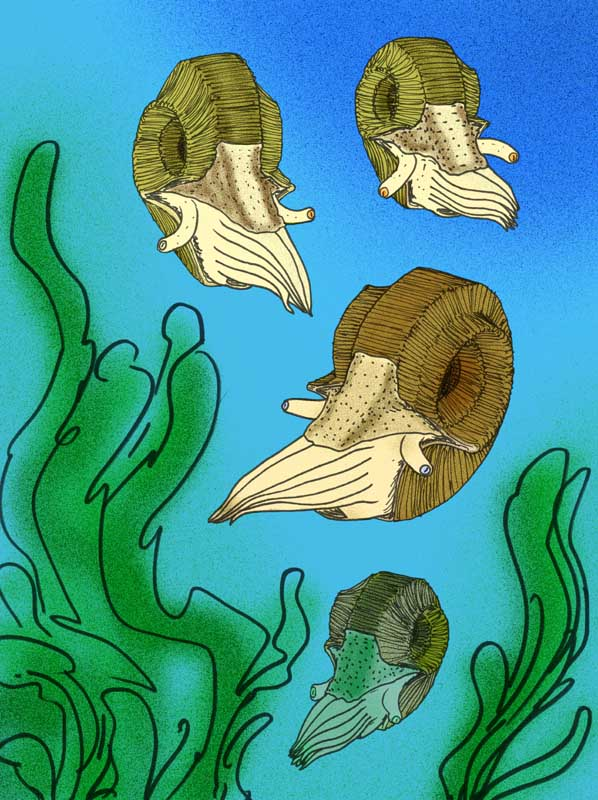
- Various species of Araxoceras

Scientific classification
- Kingdom: Animalia
- Phylum: Mollusca
- Class: Cephalopoda
- Subclass: †Ammonoidea
- Order: †Ceratitida
- Superfamily: †Otoceratoidea
- Family: †Araxoceratidae; Ruzhencev 1959

Subfamilies
- Araxoceratinae; Konglingitinae

= Araxoceratidae =

Araxoceratidae Temporal range: Permian - Early Triassic

Extinct family of molluscs

Araxoceratidae is an extinct family of ceratitid ammonites, cephalopods that were found throughout the world. They arose during the Permian and died out during the early Triassic. The species of the type genus Araxoceras are used as markers for various Permian epochs.
