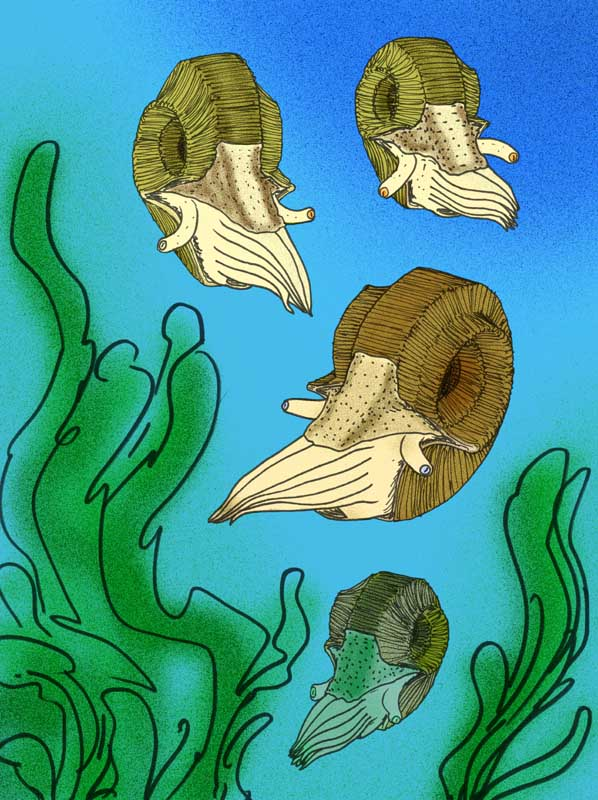
- Various species of Araxoceras

Scientific classification
- Kingdom: Animalia
- Phylum: Mollusca
- Class: Cephalopoda
- Subclass: †Ammonoidea
- Order: †Ceratitida
- Suborder: †Otoceratina
- Superfamily: †Otoceratoidea; Hyatt, 1900

Families
- Anderssonoceratidae; Araxoceratidae; Etoushanocertidae; Otoceratidae

Synonyms
- Otocerataceae

= Otoceratoidea =

Otoceratoidea Temporal range: Lopingian–Early Triassic

Extinct superfamily of molluscs

Otoceratoidea, formerly Otocerataceae, is an extinct superfamily of ammonite cephalopods in the order Ceratitida.
