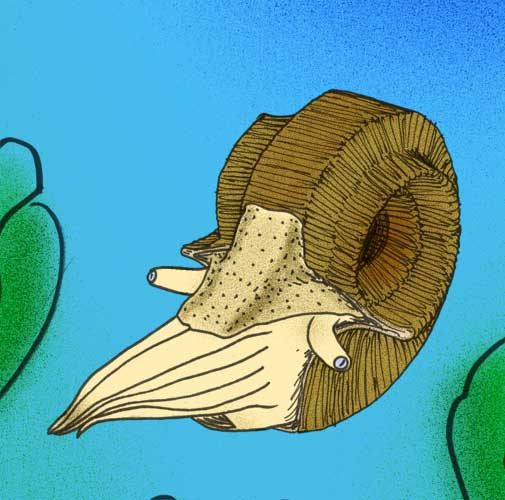
- Araxoceras latissimum

Scientific classification
- Domain: Eukaryota
- Kingdom: Animalia
- Phylum: Mollusca
- Class: Cephalopoda
- Subclass: †Ammonoidea
- Order: †Ceratitida
- Family: †Araxoceratidae
- Subfamily: †Araxoceratinae
- Genus: †Araxoceras; Ruzhencev, 1959

Type species
- Araxoceras latissimum

Species
- A. latissimum Ruzhencev, 1959; A. latum Ruzhencev, 1962; A. trochoides Abich, 1959; A. rotoides Ruzhencev, 1962; A. varicatum Ruzhencev, 1962; A. glenisteri Ruzhencev, 1962; A. tectum Ruzhencev, 1962; A. kiangsiense Chao, 1965; A. abarquense Zakharov et Mousavi Abnavi, 2010; A. iranense Zakharov et Mousavi Abnavi, 2010

= Araxoceras =

Araxoceras Temporal range: Wuchiapingian

Genus of molluscs (fossil)

Araxoceras is an extinct genus of ceratitid ammonites that lived in the Late Permian marine environments of Iran, South China and Japan. The various species had distinctive, angular-cornered shells.
