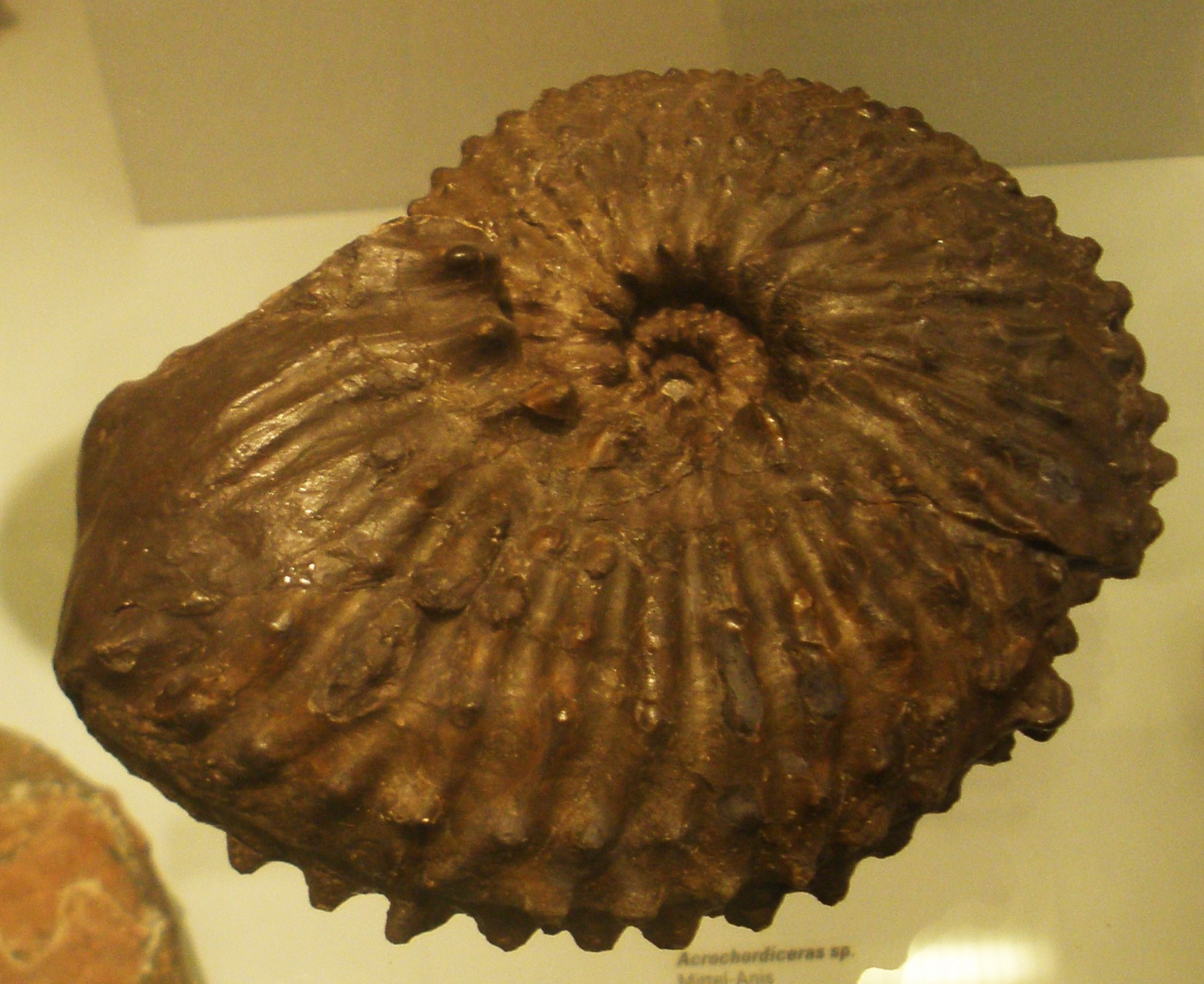
- Fossil of Protrachyceras archelaus

Scientific classification
- Domain: Eukaryota
- Kingdom: Animalia
- Phylum: Mollusca
- Class: Cephalopoda
- Subclass: †Ammonoidea
- Order: †Ceratitida
- Family: †Trachyceratidae
- Subfamily: †Protrachyceratinae
- Genus: †Protrachyceras; Mojsisovics 1893

= Protrachyceras =

Protrachyceras Temporal range: Triassic

Genus of molluscs (fossil)

Protrachyceras is a genus of ceratitid ammonoid cephalopods belonging to the family Trachyceratidae.

== Species ==
- Protrachyceras costulatum Mansuy 1912
- Protrachyceras deprati Mansuy 1912
- Protrachyceras reitzi Boeckh 1875
- Protrachyceras sikanianum McLearn 1930
- Protrachyceras springeri Smith 1914
- Protrachyceras storrsi Smith 1927 was rearranged to Sirenites storrsi (SMITH ) by Tozer 1968

== Fossil record ==
Fossils of Protrachyceras are found in marine strata from the Triassic (age range: from 242.0 to 221.5 million years ago.). Fossils are known from many localities in Afghanistan, Canada, China, India, Italy, Japan, Romania, the Russian Federation, Slovenia, Spain, Switzerland, Thailand and United States.

== Gallery ==
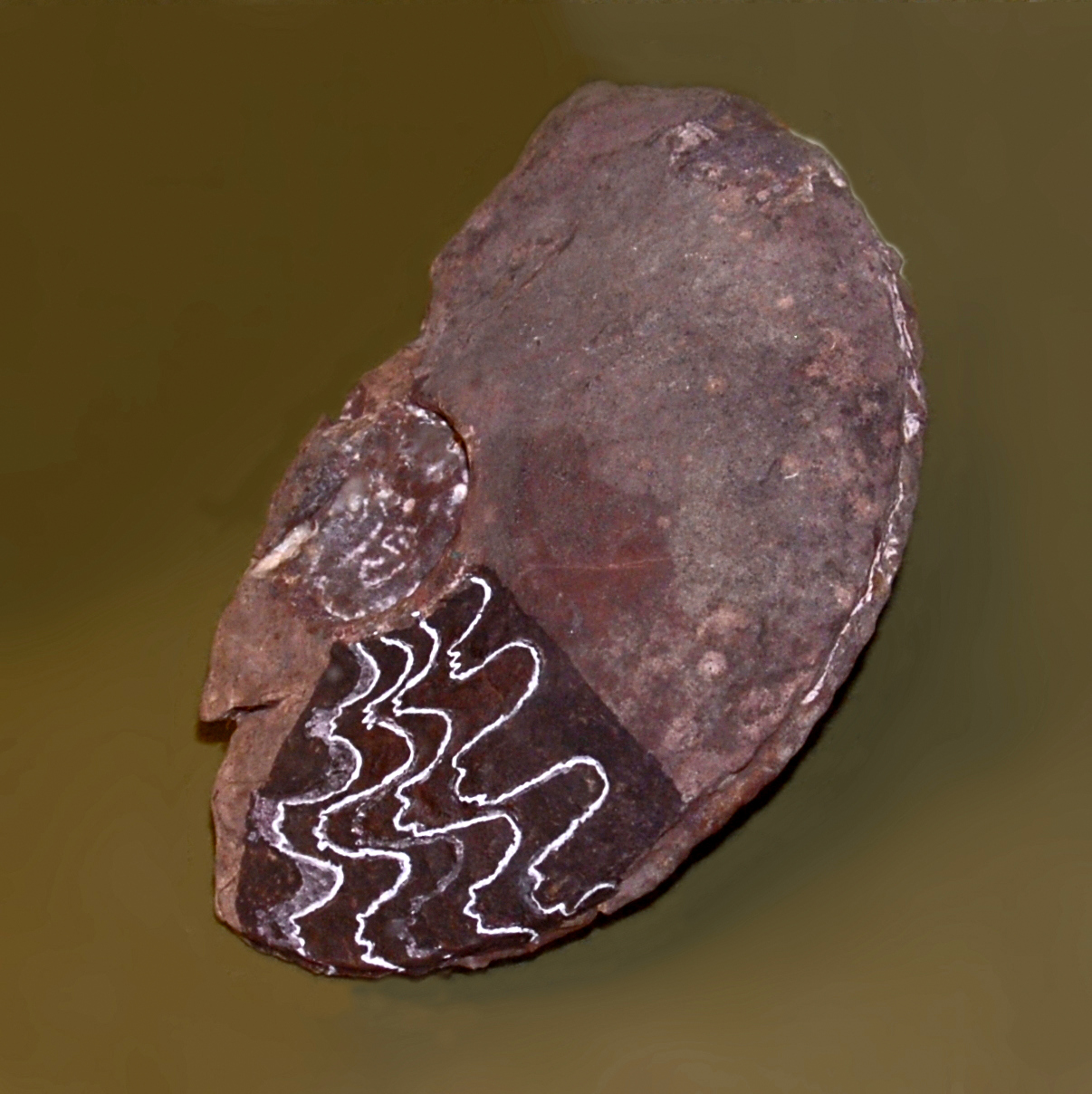
Protrachyceras psaeudoarchelonus

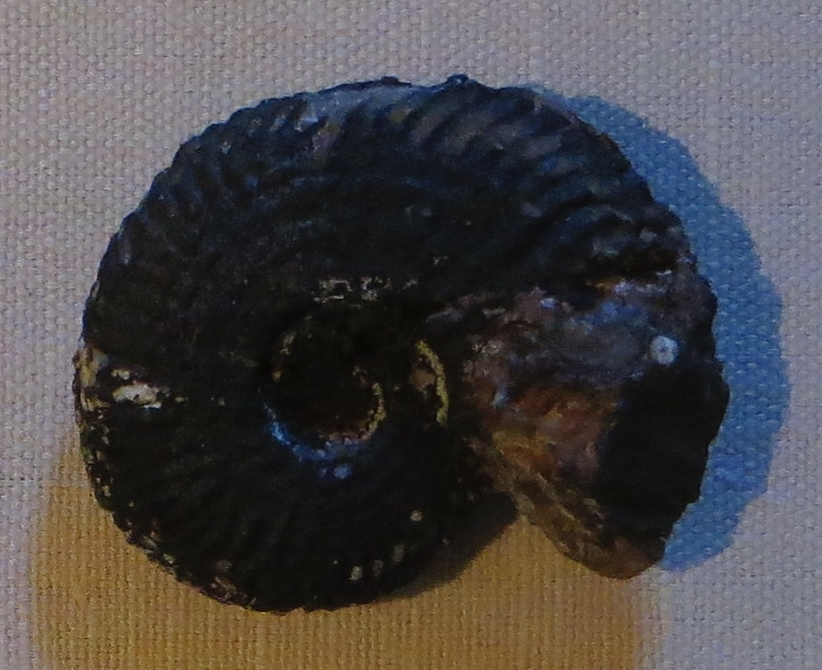
Protrachyceras margaritosum

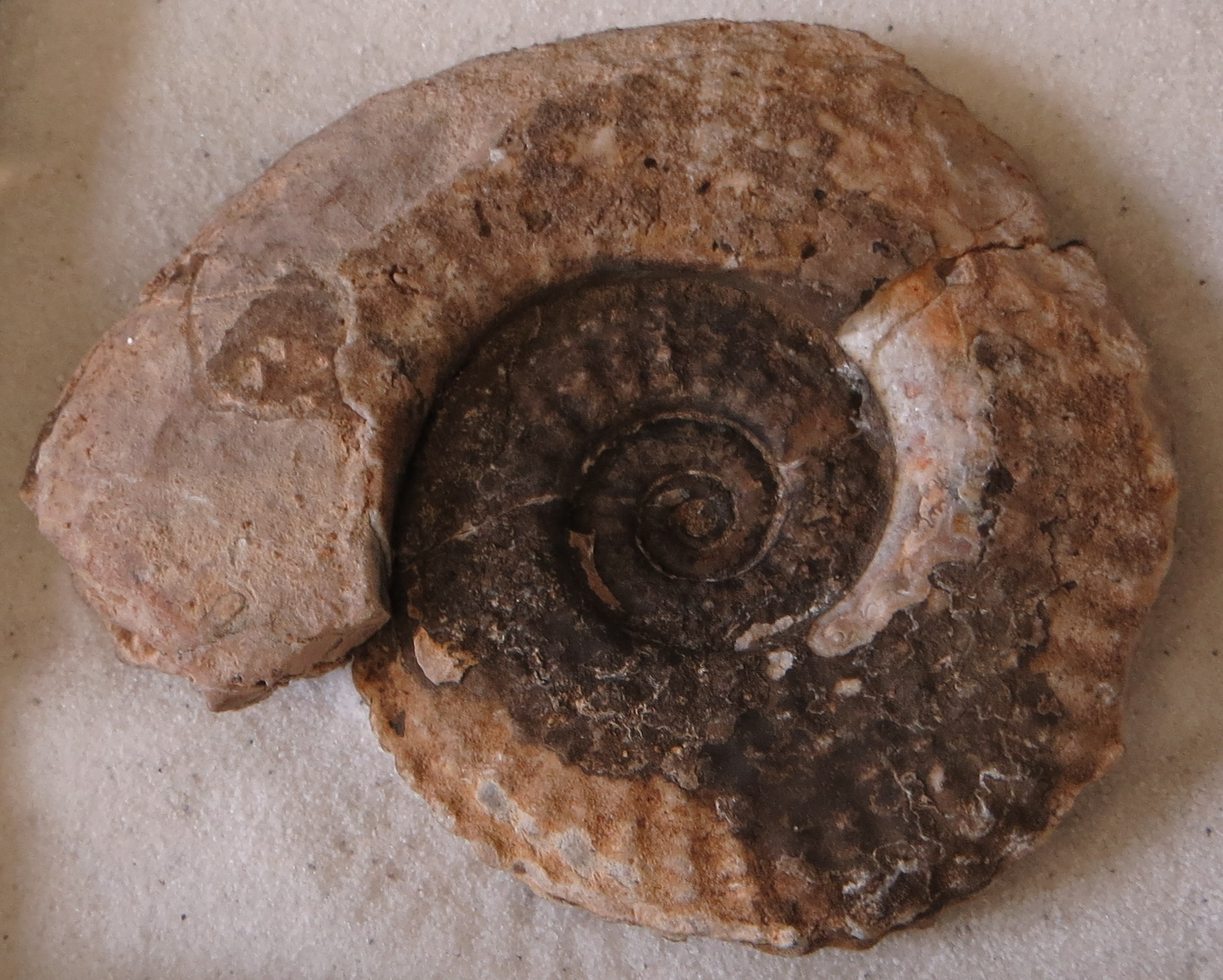
Protrachyceras rudolphi

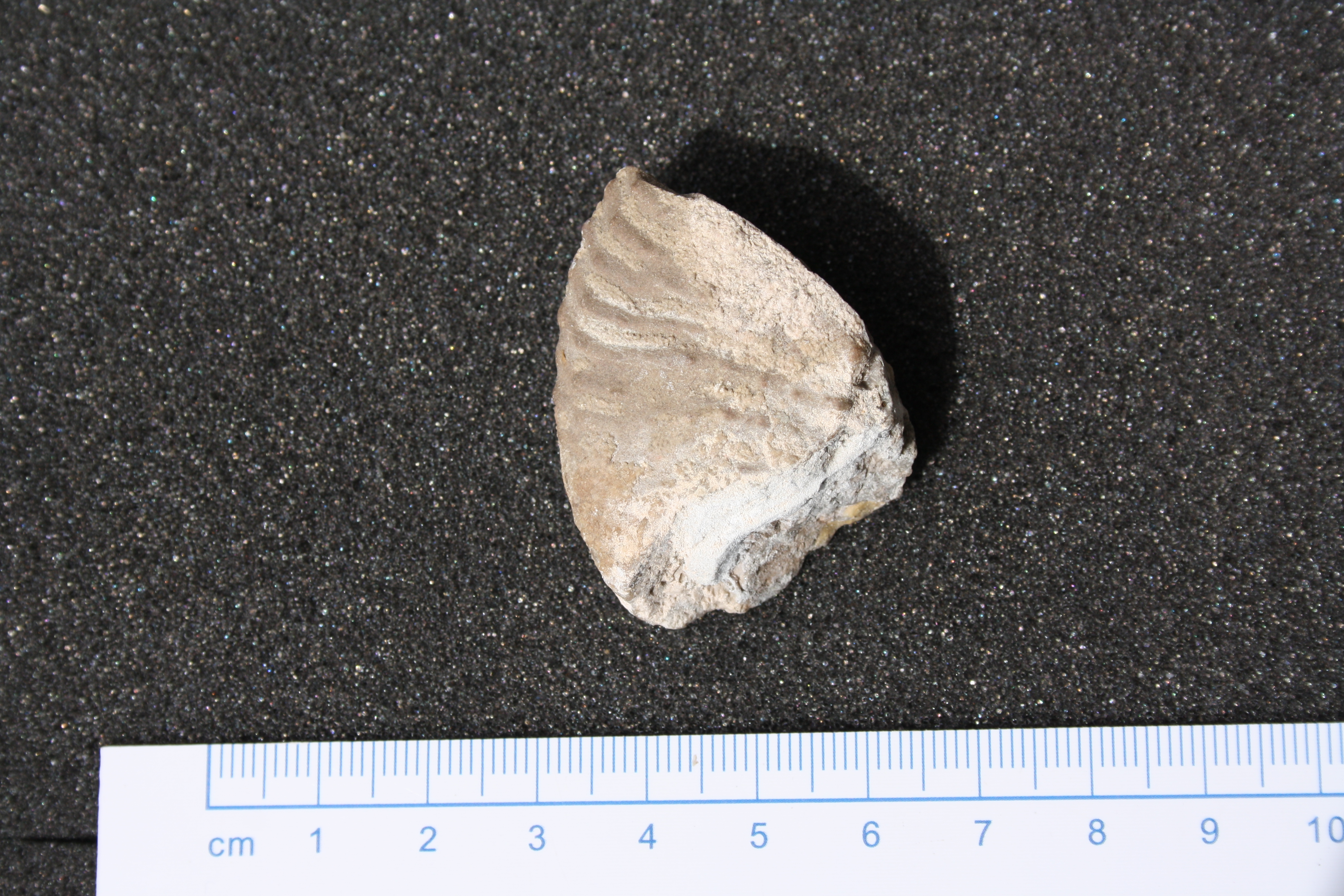
Protrachyceras longobardicum

== Bibliography ==
- Arkell et al. Mesozoic Ammonoidea. Treatise on Invertebrate Paleontology, Part L. 1957
- Bernhard Kummel 1952. A Classification of Triassic Ammonoids. Jour of Paleontology, Vol 26, No.5, pp 847–853
