= Otoceratidae =

Scientific classification
- Kingdom: Animalia
- Phylum: Mollusca
- Class: Cephalopoda
- Subclass: †Ammonoidea
- Order: †Ceratitida
- Superfamily: †Otoceratoidea
- Family: †Otoceratidae; Hyatt, 1900

Genera
- †Anotoceras; †Julfotoceras; †Metotoceras; †Otoceras

Extinct family of molluscs

Otoceratidae is an extinct family of cephalopods belonging to the Ammonite subclass in the order Ceratitida.
