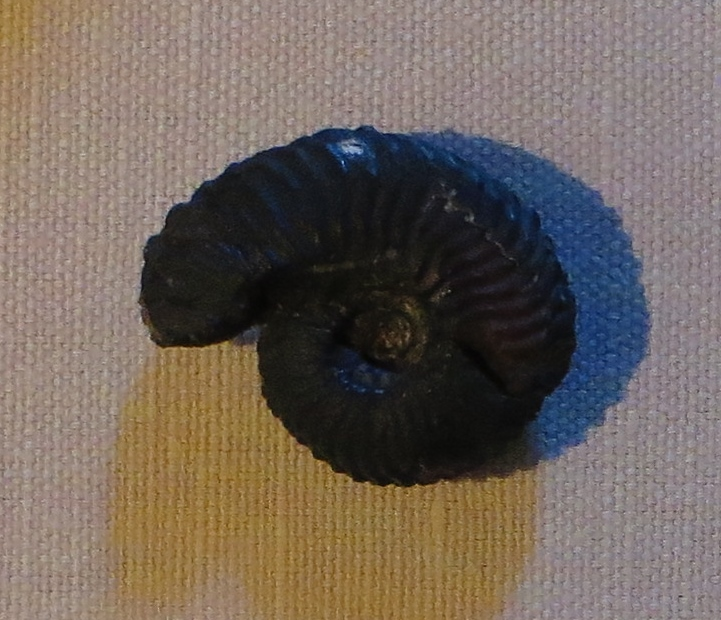
- Anolcites doleriticus

Scientific classification
- Domain: Eukaryota
- Kingdom: Animalia
- Phylum: Mollusca
- Class: Cephalopoda
- Subclass: †Ammonoidea
- Order: †Ceratitida
- Family: †Trachyceratidae
- Subfamily: †Anolcitinae
- Genus: †Anolcites; Mojsisovics, 1893

= Anolcites =

Anolcites Temporal range: M Triassic

Genus of molluscs (fossil)

Anolcites is a genus of extinct ammonoid cephalopods from the Middle Triassic belonging to the ceratitid family Trachyceratidae.

Specifically Anolcites is a middle Triassic trachyceriatid with no distinct ventral furrow and ribs that cross the venter. The shell is basically evolute and highly ornamented with close spaced flexious, or sigmoidal, ribbing. The whorl section is compressed with straight sides and strongly arched venter.

Anolcites has been found in British Columbia, China, India, and Italy.
