= Anderssonoceratidae =

Scientific classification
- Kingdom: Animalia
- Phylum: Mollusca
- Class: Cephalopoda
- Subclass: †Ammonoidea
- Order: †Ceratitida
- Superfamily: †Otoceratoidea
- Family: †Anderssonoceratidae; Ruzhencev 1959

Subfamilies
- Anderssonoceratinae; Planodiscoceratinae

Extinct family of molluscs

Anderssonoceratidae is an extinct family of cephalopods belonging to the ammonite subclass in the order Ceratitida.
