= Choristoceratoidea =

Choristoceratoidea Temporal range: Norian–Rhaetian

Scientific classification
- Domain: Eukaryota
- Kingdom: Animalia
- Phylum: Mollusca
- Class: Cephalopoda
- Subclass: †Ammonoidea
- Order: †Ceratitida
- Superfamily: †Choristoceratoidea; Hyatt, 1900

Families
- Choristoceratidae; Cochloceratidae; Rhabdoceratidae

Extinct superfamily of ammonites

Choristoceratoidea, formerly Choristocerataceae, is a superfamily of Late Triassic ceratitid ammonites. They can be characterized by their simple, four-lobed suture lines and unusual heteromorph shell shapes, which can resemble straight rods or twisting cones rather than the flat coils typical of other ammonites. The shells are usually small (less than 3 cm long) and ornamented with prominent ribbing.
