= Arctosirenites =

Arctosirenites Temporal range: Triassic

Scientific classification
- Domain: Eukaryota
- Kingdom: Animalia
- Phylum: Mollusca
- Class: Cephalopoda
- Subclass: †Ammonoidea
- Order: †Ceratitida
- Family: †Trachyceratidae
- Subfamily: †Arpaditinae
- Genus: †Arctosirenites; Tozer, 1961

Genus of molluscs (fossil)

Arctosirenites is a genus of extinct ceratitid ammonoids from the Triassic of British Columbia and Nunavut, Canada, included in the Trachyceratidae.
