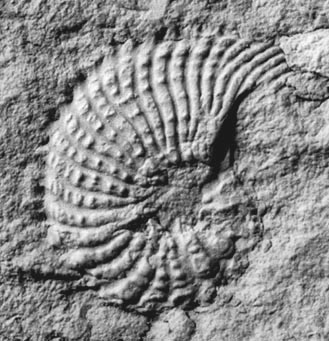
- Fossil of Brotheotrachyceras brotheus

Scientific classification
- Kingdom: Animalia
- Phylum: Mollusca
- Class: Cephalopoda
- Subclass: †Ammonoidea
- Order: †Ceratitida
- Superfamily: †Clydonitoidea
- Family: †Trachyceratidae; Haug, 1894

Synonyms
- Trachycerataceae Haug, 1894

= Trachyceratidae =

Trachyceratidae Temporal range: Devonian - Triassic

Family of molluscs (fossil)

The Trachyceratidae is an extinct family of ceratitid ammonoid cephalopods.

The Trachyceratidae makes up part of the superfamily Trachyceratoidea along with such families as the Buchitidae, Distichitidae, Dronovitidae and Noridiscitidae.

== Fossil record ==
Fossils of Trachyceratidae are found in marine strata from the Devonian to the Triassic. Fossils are known from many localities in Afghanistan, Canada, China, Europe (Slovenia, Spain, Switzerland, Ukraine), India, Japan, the Russian Federation, Thailand, and the United States.

== Description ==
Trachyceratid shells are more or less involute and highly ornamented. They have their whorl sides covered with flexuous ribs that are usually tuberculate. The venters generally have a median furrow bordered by rows of tubercles or continuous keels.

== Classification ==
Trachyceratidae

- Boreotrachyceras Konstantinov 2012
- Brotheotrachyceras Urlichs 1994
- Hannaoceras Tomlin 1931
- Okhototrachyceras Konstantinov 2012
- Trachyceratinae Haug 1894
  - Austrotrachyceras Krystyn 1978
  - Muensterites Mojsisovics 1893
  - Trachyceras Laube 1869
  - Neoprotrachyceras Krystyn 1978
- Arpaditinae Hyatt 1900
  - Arctoarpadites Tozer 1994
  - Arctosirenites Tozer 1961
  - Argolites Renz 1939
  - Arpadites Mojsisovics 1879
  - Dittmarites Mojsisovics 1893
  - Edmundites Diener 1916
  - Hisnitites Tozer 1994
  - Klipsteinia von Mojsisovics 1882
  - Liardites Tozer 1963
  - Meginoceras McLearn 1930
  - Otoarpadites Tozer 1994
  - Silenticeras McLearn 1930
  - Trachystenoceras Johnston 1941
  - Yakutosirenites Tozer 1994
- Sirenitinae Tozer 1971
  - Anasirenites Mojsisovics 1893
  - Diplosirenites Mojsisovics 1893
  - Neosirenites Popov 1961
  - Norosirenites Tozer 1994
  - Orientosirenites Konstantinov 2018
  - Pamphagosirenites Popov 1961
  - Pseudosirenites Arthaber 1911
  - Pterosirenites Tozer 1980
  - Seimkanites Konstantinov 1999
  - Sirenites Mojsisovics 1893
  - Sirenotrachyceras Krystyn 1978
  - Striatosirenites Popov 1961
  - Vredenburgites Diener 1916
- Protrachyceratinae Tozer 1971
  - Eoprotrachyceras Tozer 1980
  - Paratrachyceras Arthaber 1915
  - Protrachyceras Mojsisovics 1893
  - Spirogmoceras Silberling 1956
- Anolcitinae Mietto and Manfrin 2008
  - Anolcites Mojsisovics 1893
  - Asklepioceras Renz 1910
  - Daxatina Strand 1929
  - Falsanolcites Rieber and Brack 2004
  - Frankites Tozer 1971
  - Maclearnoceras Tozer 1963
  - Zestoceras Tozer 1994
- Haoceratinae Balini and Zou 2015
  - Haoceras Balini and Zou 2015
  - Sinomeginoceras Balini and Zou 2015

== Gallery ==
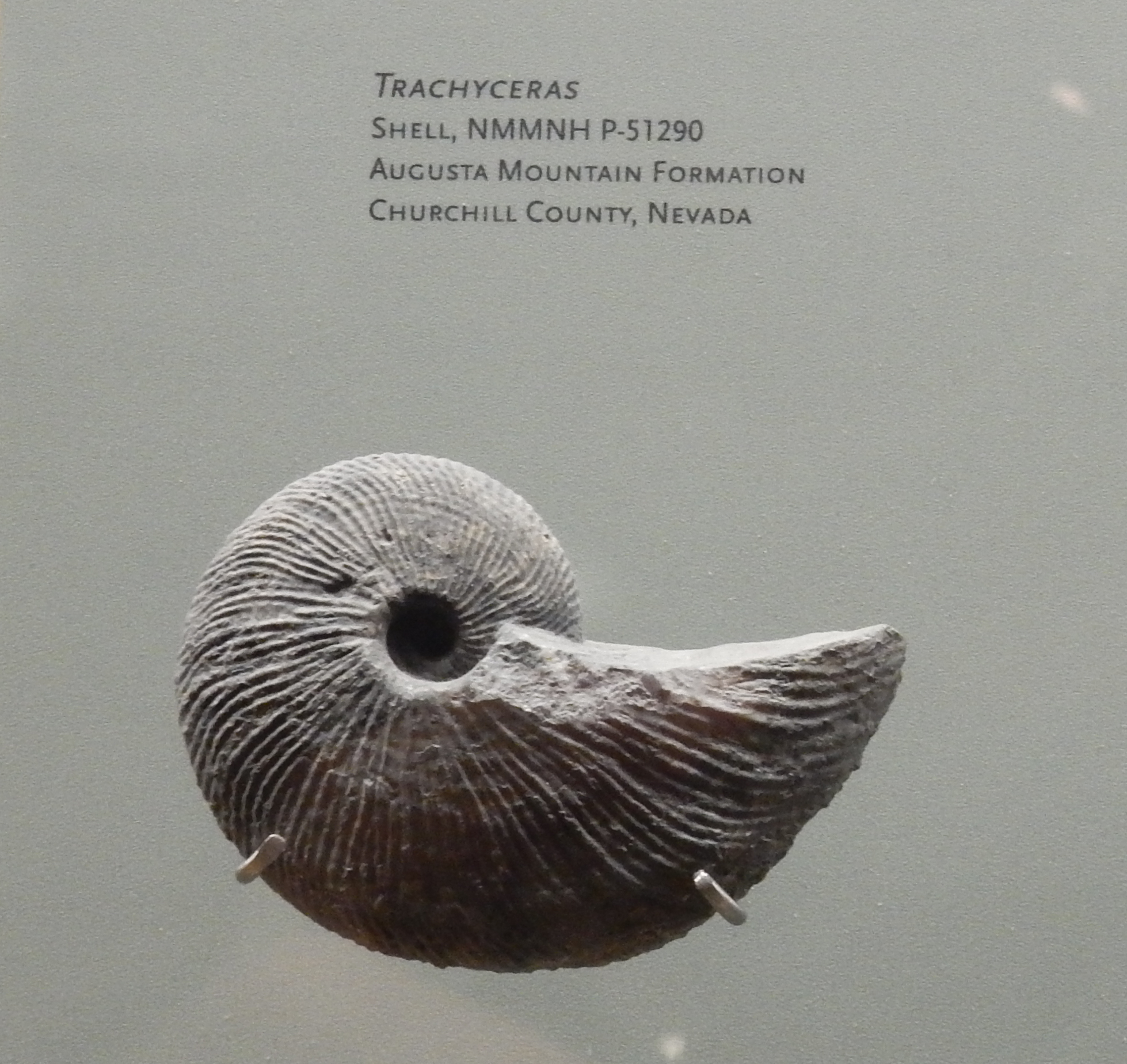
Trachyceras sp. at the New Mexico Museum of Natural History and Science

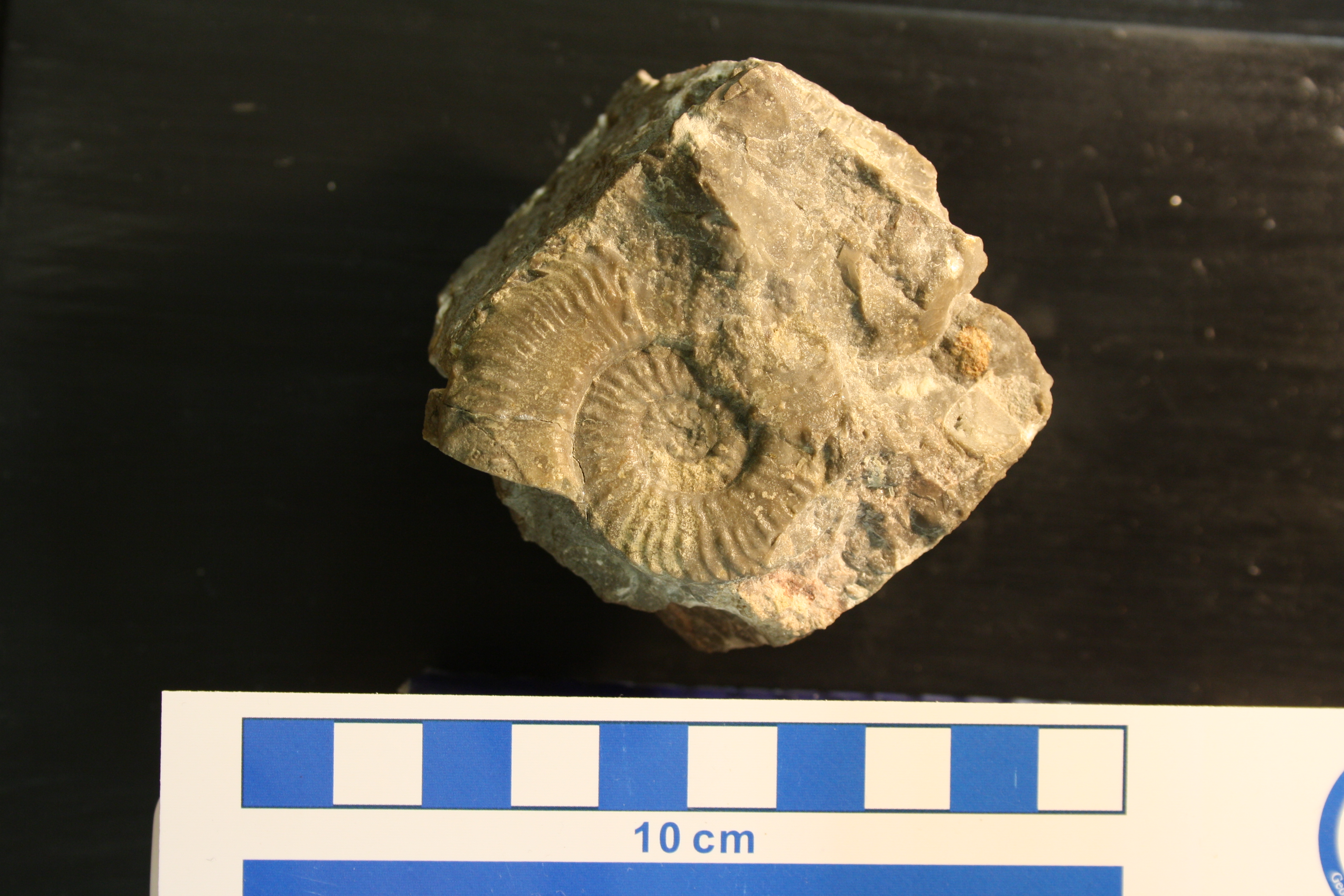
Arpadites szaboi

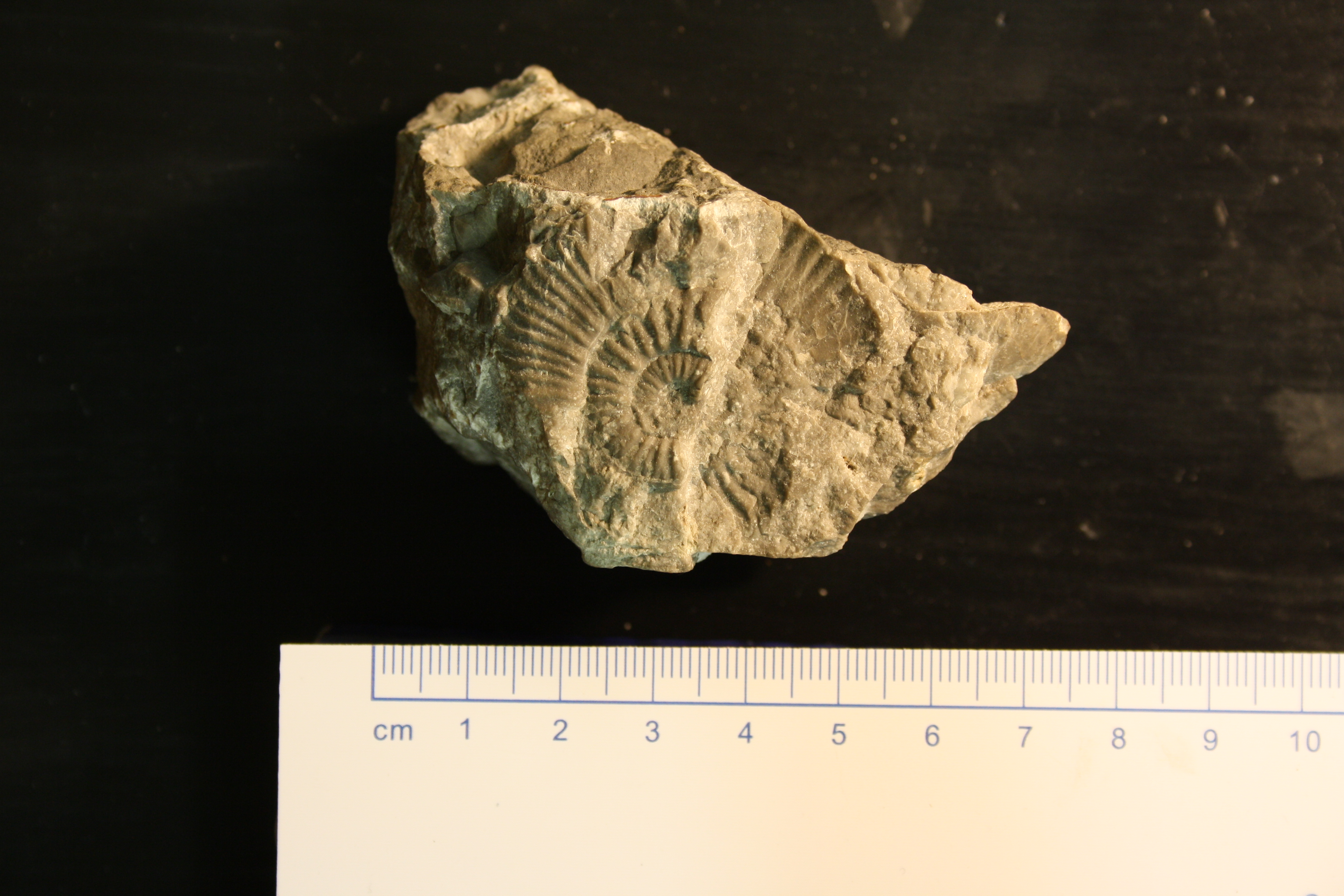
Arpadites arpadis

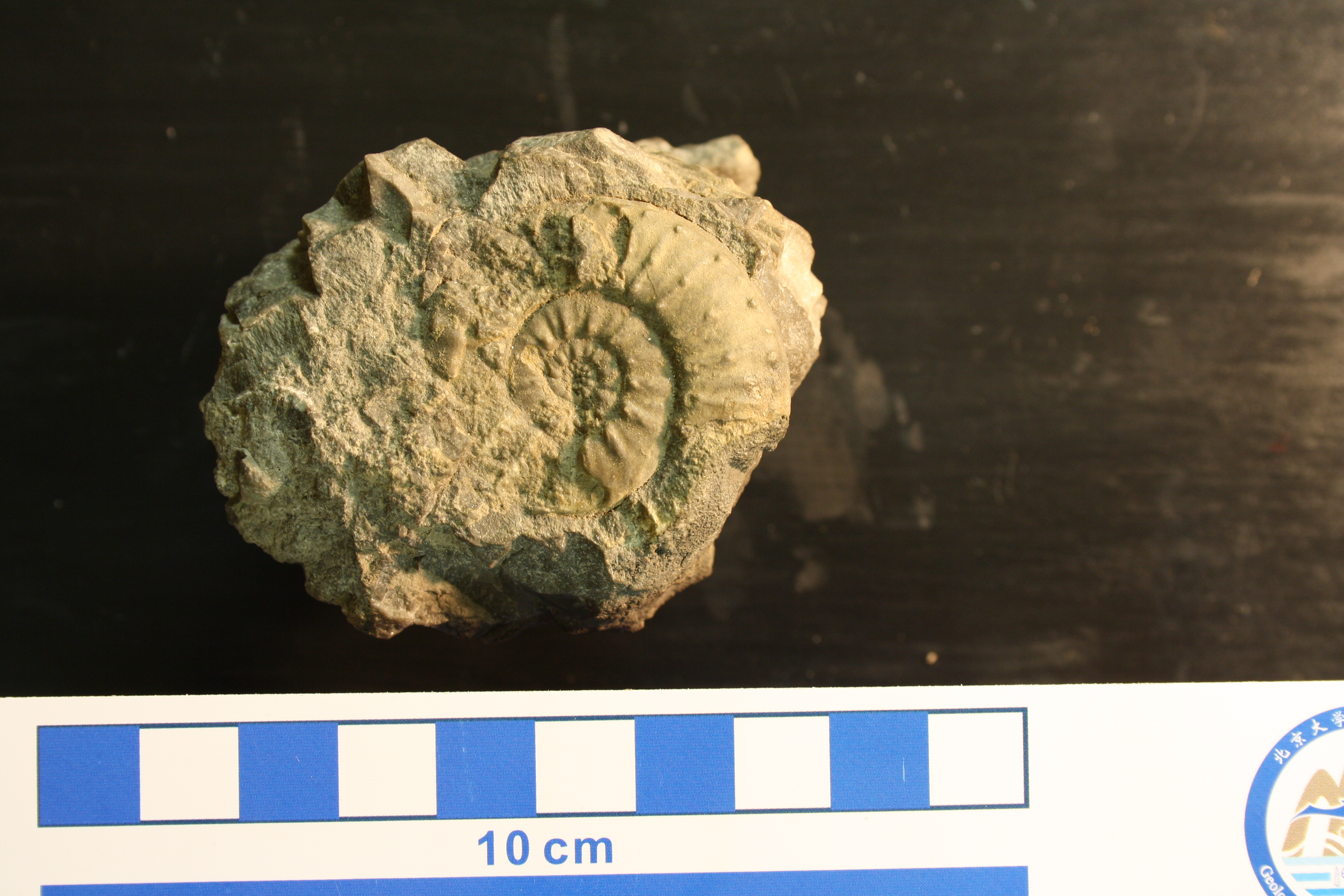
Arpadites telleri

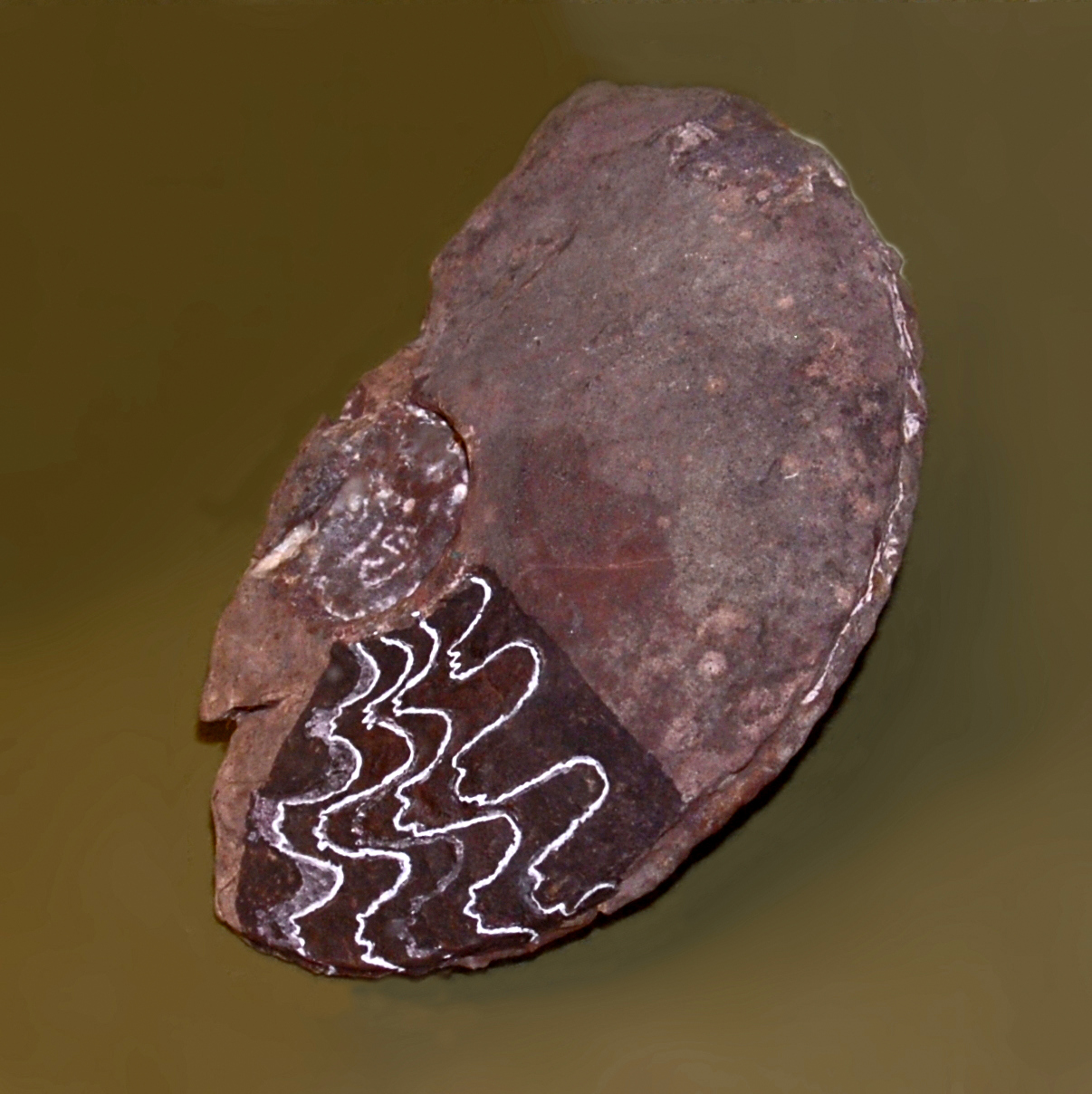
Protrachyceras psaeudoarchelonus

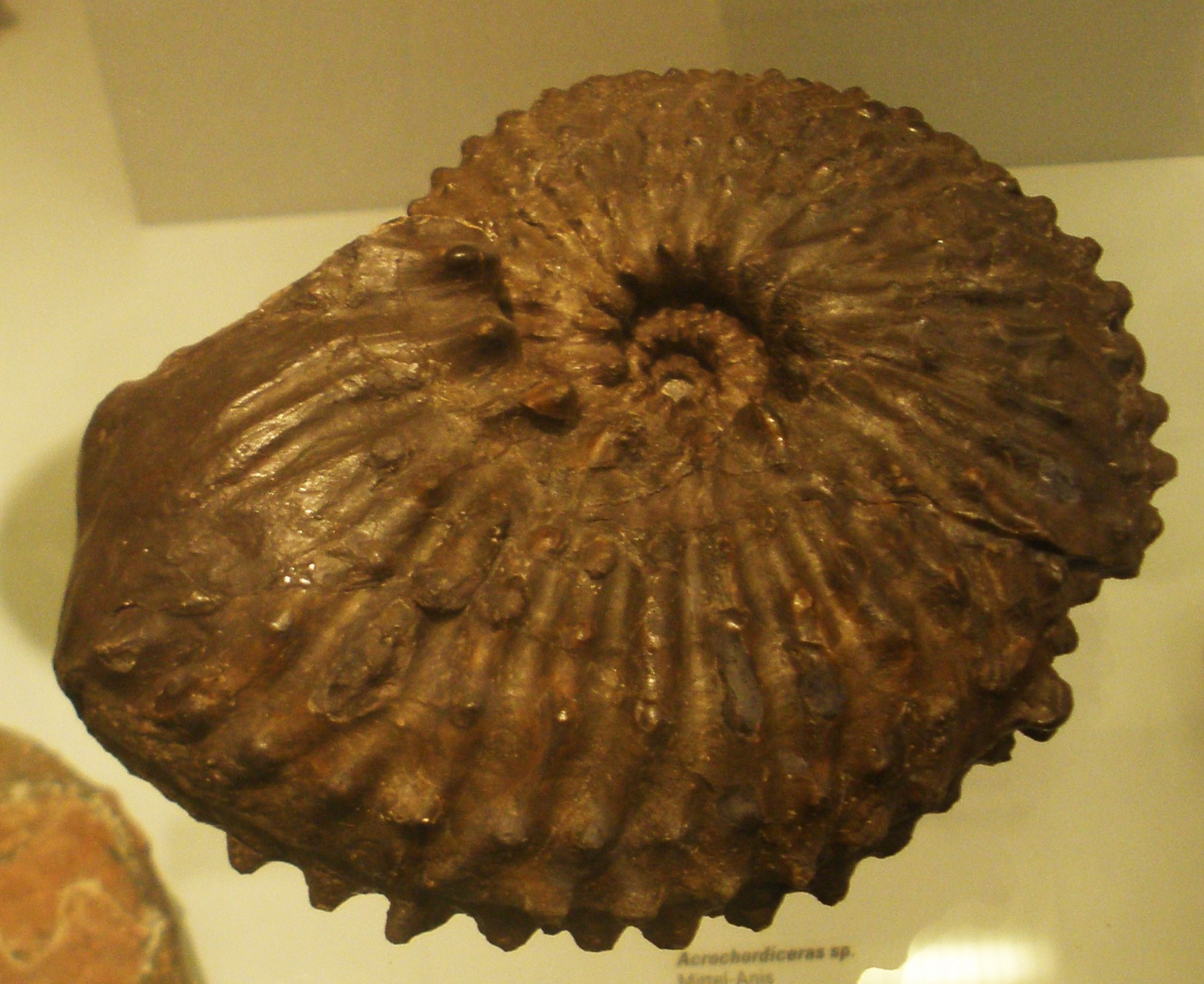
Protrachyceras archelaus

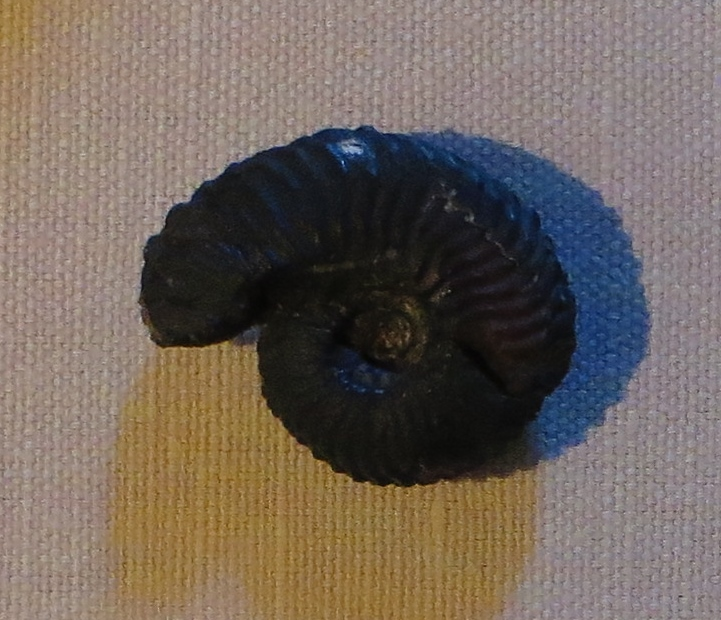
Anolcites doleriticus

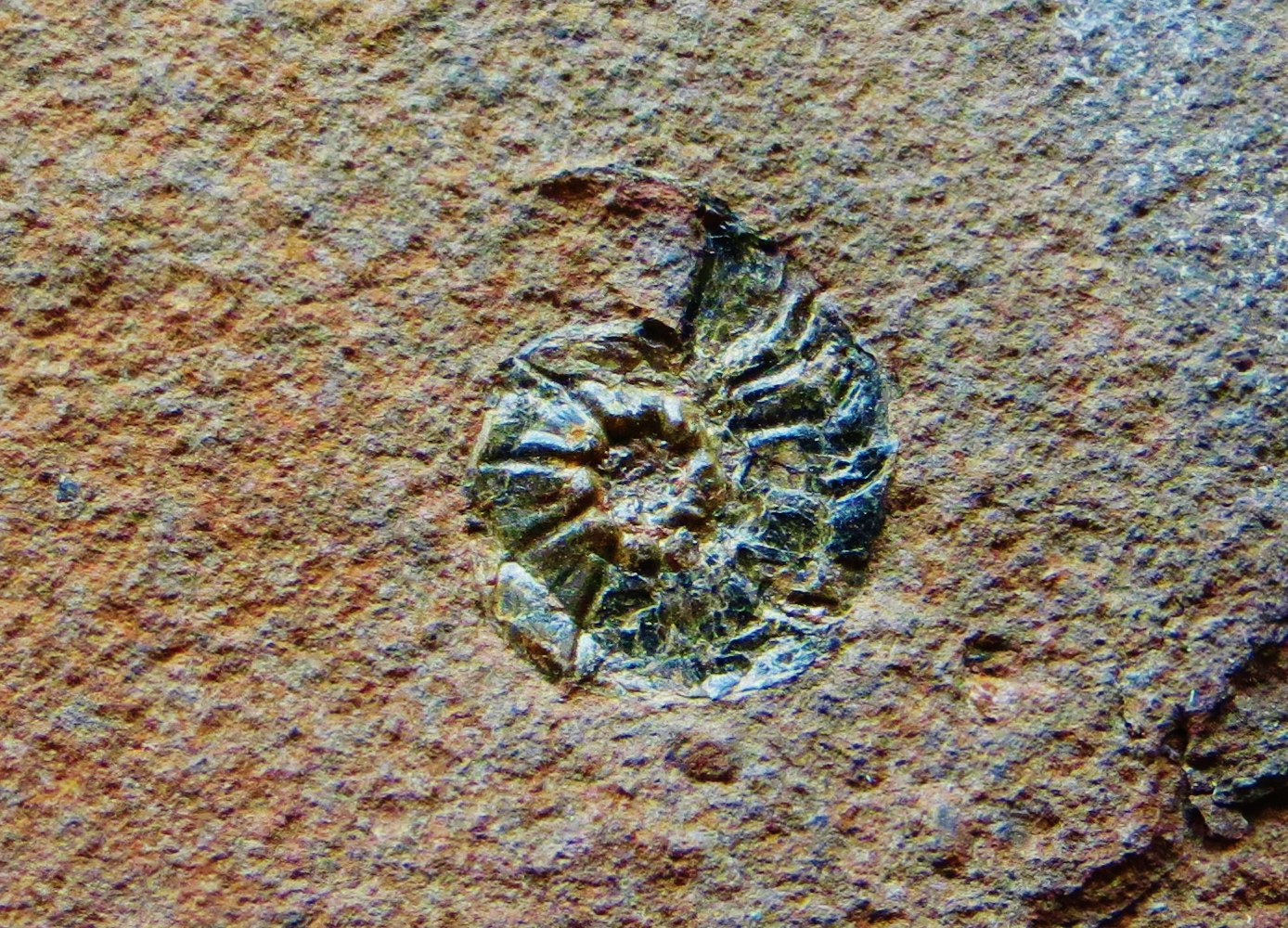
Asklepioceras sp. at Museo di Storia naturale "Antonio Stoppani"

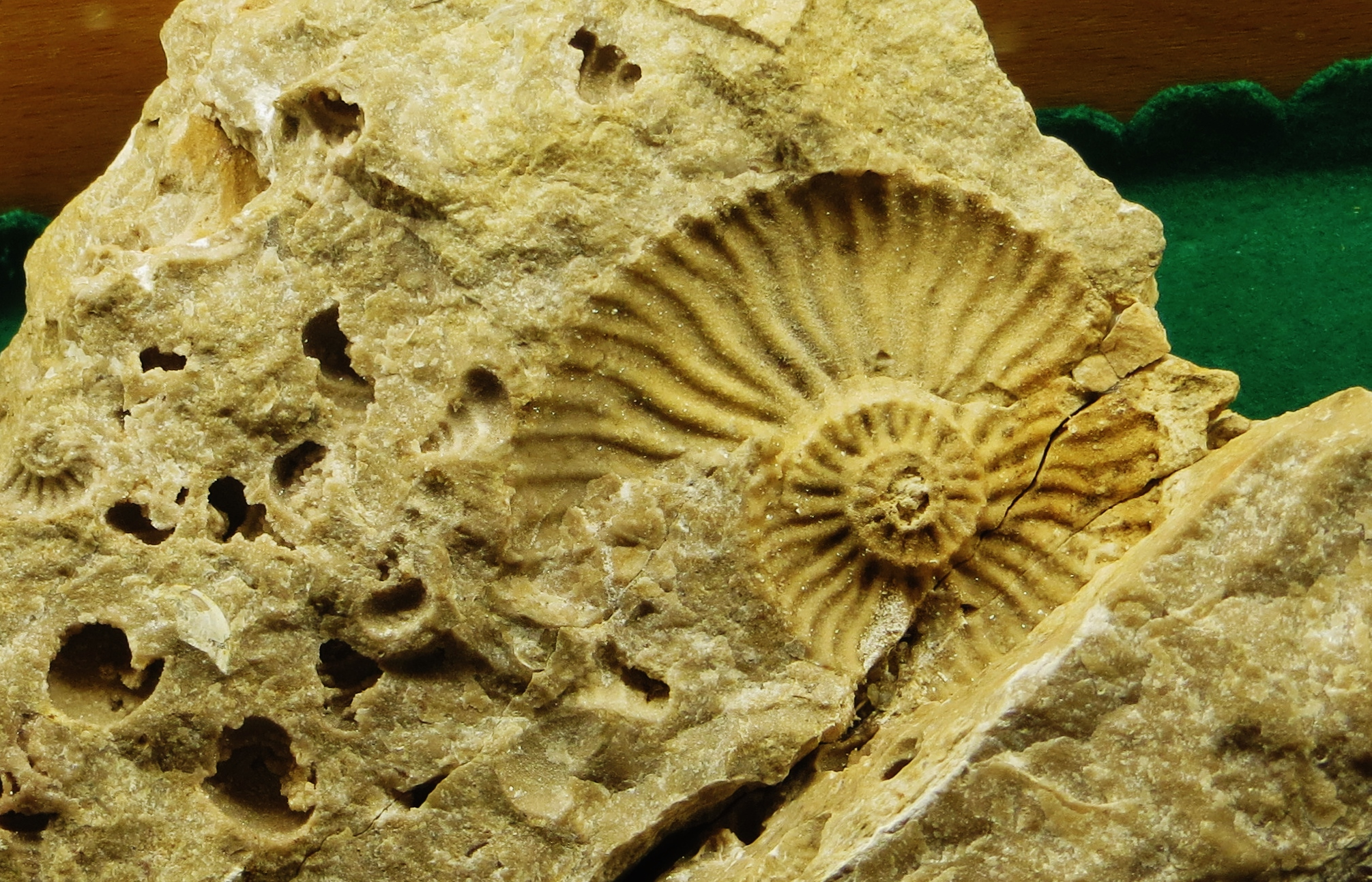
Falsanolcites gortanii (also known as Protrachyceras gortanii)
