= Austrotrachyceras =

Austrotrachyceras Temporal range: Carnian

Scientific classification
- Kingdom: Animalia
- Phylum: Mollusca
- Class: Cephalopoda
- Subclass: †Ammonoidea
- Order: †Ceratitida
- Family: †Trachyceratidae
- Subfamily: †Trachyceratinae
- Genus: †Austrotrachyceras; Krystyn, 1978

Species
- Austrotrachyceras obesum

Extinct genus of molluscs

Austrotrachyceras is a genus of ammonite cephalopod, belonging to the order Ceratitida.

The family to which Austrotrachyceras belongs, Trachyceratidae involute, highly ornamented shells and ceratitic to ammonitic sutures.

== Bibliography ==
Arkell, W.J.; Kummel, B.; Wright, C.W. (1957). Mesozoic Ammonoidea. Treatise on Invertebrate Paleontology, Part L, Mollusca 4. Lawrence, Kansas: Geological Society of America and University of Kansas Press.
