= Daxatina =

Daxatina Temporal range: Ladinian

Scientific classification
- Kingdom: Animalia
- Phylum: Mollusca
- Class: Cephalopoda
- Subclass: †Ammonoidea
- Order: †Ceratitida
- Family: †Trachyceratidae
- Subfamily: †Anolcitinae
- Genus: †Daxatina; Strand, 1929

Species
- D. canadensis; D. laubei; D. limpida; D. megabrotheus

Extinct genus of molluscs

Daxatina is a fossil ammonoid cephalopod included in the trachyceratid family of the order Ceratitida that lived during the middle of the Triassic.

== Distribution ==
Triassic of Canada, Italy, Svalbard, Jan Mayen and Alaska

== See also ==
- Ammonoidea
- Ceratitida
- Trachyceratidae
- Triassic
- Ammonoid
