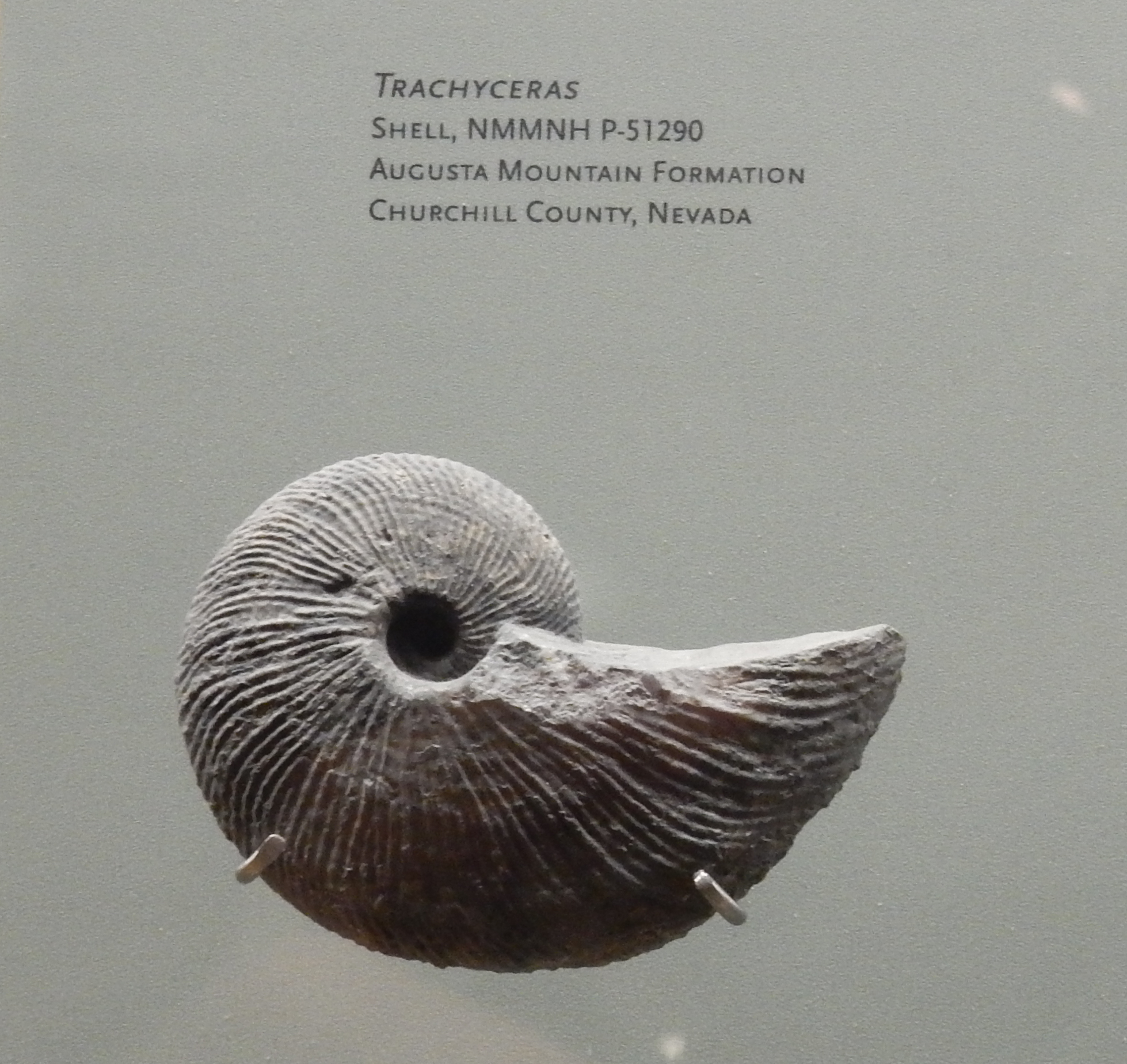
- Trachyceras fossil at the New Mexico Museum of Natural History and Science

Scientific classification
- Kingdom: Animalia
- Phylum: Mollusca
- Class: Cephalopoda
- Subclass: †Ammonoidea
- Order: †Ceratitida
- Family: †Trachyceratidae
- Subfamily: †Trachyceratinae
- Genus: †Trachyceras; Laube 1869

= Trachyceras =

Trachyceras Temporal range: Carnian

Extinct genus of molluscs

Trachyceras is a genus of ammonoid cephalopods belonging to the order Ceratitida. The type species is Trachyceras aon, which was first described by Georg zu Münster in 1834 as a species of Ceratites. The genus includes many species found in Afghanistan, Bosnia and Herzegovina, Canada, China, Germany, Hungary, India, Indonesia, Italy, the Russian Federation, Slovenia, and the United States.

The family to which Trachyceras belongs, the Trachyceratidae, has more or less involute, highly ornamented shells and ceratitic to ammonitic sutures.
