= Carnian =

First age of the Late Triassic epoch

- ~237 – ~227.3 Ma
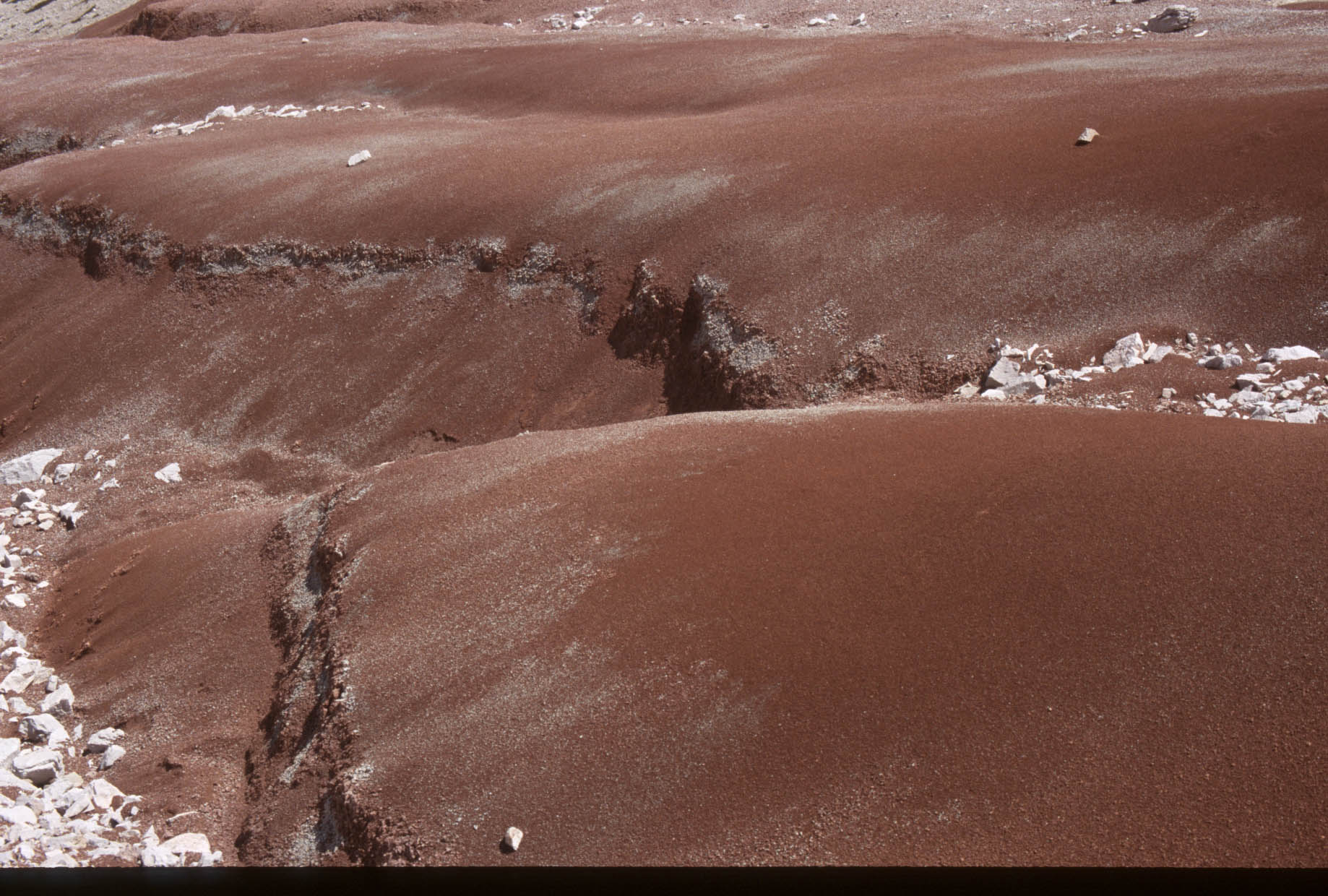
- Alluvial plain red clays of the Travenanzes Formation, upper Carnian, the Dolomites, northern Italy

Chronology
← / Triassic–Jurassic extinction event; ← / Scleractinian corals & calcified sponges; ← / Carnian pluvial episode; ← / Manicouagan impact; ← / Coals return; ← / Full recovery of woody trees; ← / Smithian–Spathian boundary event; ← / Permian-Triassic extinction event
Subdivision of the Triassic according to the ICS, as of 2024. Vertical axis scale: Millions of years ago

Etymology
- Name formality: Formal
- Alternate spelling(s): Karnian

Usage information
- Celestial body: Earth
- Regional usage: Global (ICS)
- Time scale(s) used: ICS Time Scale

Definition
- Chronological unit: Age
- Stratigraphic unit: Stage
- Time span formality: Formal
- Lower boundary definition: FAD of the Ammonite Daxatina canadensis
- Lower boundary GSSP: Prati di Stuores, Dolomites, Italy; 46.5269°N 11.9303°E
- Lower GSSP ratified: 2008
- Upper boundary definition: Not formally defined
- Upper boundary definition candidates: Base of Stikinoceras kerri ammonoid zone and near FAD of Metapolygnathus echinatus within the M. communisti conodont zones
- Upper boundary GSSP candidate section(s): Black Bear Ridge, British Columbia, Canada; Pizzo Mondello, Sicily, Italy

The Carnian (less commonly, Karnian) is the lowermost stage of the Upper Triassic Series (or earliest age of the Late Triassic Epoch). It lasted from 237 to 227.3 million years ago (Ma). The Carnian is preceded by the Ladinian and is followed by the Norian. Its boundaries are not characterized by major extinctions or biotic turnovers, but a climatic event (known as the Carnian pluvial episode characterized by substantial rainfall) occurred during the Carnian and seems to be associated with important extinctions or biotic radiations. Another extinction occurred at the Carnian-Norian boundary, ending the Carnian age.

== Stratigraphic definitions ==
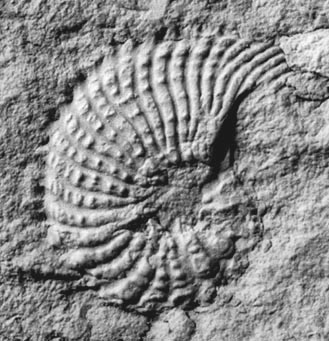
Brotheotrachyceras brotheus from the San Cassiano Formation, Val Badia, Dolomites, Southern Alps. This ammonoid is an index fossil for the lower Carnian

The Carnian was named in 1869 by Edmund von Mojsisovics. It is unclear if it was named after the Carnic Alps or the Austrian region of Carinthia (Kärnten in German), or after the Carnia historical region in northeastern Italy. The name, however, was first used referring to a part of the Hallstatt Limestone (de) cropping out in Austria.

The base of the Carnian Stage is defined as the place in the stratigraphic record where the ammonite species Daxatina canadensis first appears. The global reference profile for the base is located at the Stuores-Wiesen near Badia in the Val Badia in the region of South Tyrol, Italy.

The top of the Carnian (the base of the Norian) is at the bases of the ammonite biozones of Klamathites macrolobatus or Stikinoceras kerri and the conodont biozones of Metapolygnathus communisti or Metapolygnathus primitius.

=== Subdivisions ===
There is no established, standard usage for the Carnian subdivisions, thus, while in some regional stratigraphies a two-substage subdivision is common:

- Julian
- Tuvalian

others prefer a three-substage organization of the stage as follows:

- Cordevolian
- Julian
- Tuvalian

=== Biostratigraphy ===
In the Tethys domain, the Carnian Stage contains six ammonite biozones:

- zone of Anatropites spinosus
- zone of Tropites subbullatus
- zone of Tropites dilleri
- zone of Austrotrachyceras austriacum
- zone of Trachyceras

The Otischalkian land vertebrate faunachron corresponds to the early late Carnian, while the Adamanian land vertebrate faunachron corresponds to the latest Carnian.

== Paleogeography and climate ==
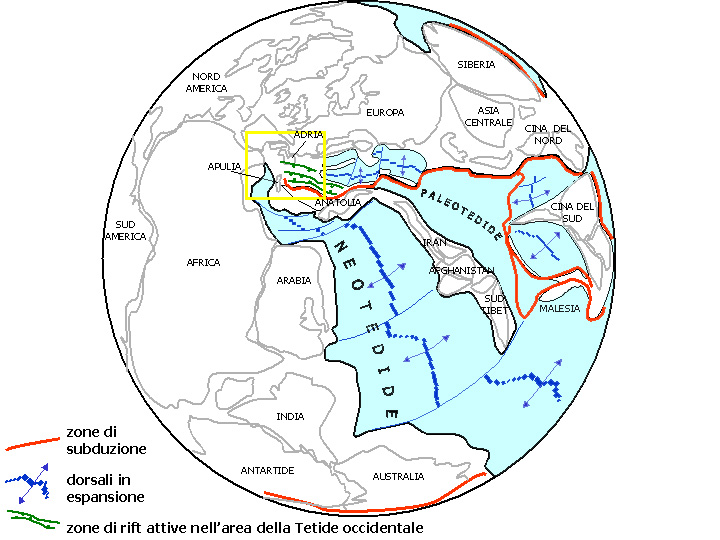
Carnian Earth

The paleogeography of the Carnian was basically the same as for the rest of the Triassic. Most continents were merged into the supercontinent Pangaea, and there was a single global ocean, Panthalassa. The global ocean had a western branch at tropical latitudes called Paleo-Tethys. The sediments of Paleo-Tethys now crop out in southeastern Europe, in the Middle East, in the Himalayas, and up to the island of Timor. The extreme land-sea distribution led to "mega-monsoons", i.e., an atmospheric monsoon regime more intense than the present one.

As for most of the Mesozoic, there were no ice caps. Climate was mostly arid in the tropics, but an episode of wet tropical climate is documented at least in the Paleo-Tethys. This putative climatic event is called the "Carnian Pluvial Event", its age being between latest early Carnian (Julian) and the beginning of late Carnian (Tuvalian).

== Carnian life ==
In the marine realm, the Carnian saw the first abundant occurrences of calcareous nanoplankton, a morphological group including the coccolithophores.

=== Invertebrates ===
There are a few invertebrates which are typical and characteristic of the Carnian. Among molluscs, the ammonoid genus Trachyceras is exclusive to the lower Carnian (i.e., Julian of the two-substages subdivision, see above). The family Tropitidae and the genus Tropites appear at the base of the upper Carnian (Tuvalian). The bivalve genus Halobia, a bottom-dweller of deep sea environments, differentiated from Daonella at the beginning of this age. Scleractinian coral reefs, i.e., reefs with corals of the modern type, became relatively common for the first time in the Carnian.

=== Vertebrates ===
The earliest unequivocal dinosaurs, such as those from the Ischigualasto Formation (e.g. Herrerasaurus and Eoraptor) and those from the Santa Maria Formation (e.g. Staurikosaurus and Buriolestes) originated during the Carnian, around 230 Ma.

In this stage the archosaurs became the dominant animals in the world, evolving into groups such as the phytosaurs, rhynchosaurs, aetosaurs, and rauisuchians. The first dinosaurs (and the pterosaur Carniadactylus) also appeared in this stage, and though at the time they were small and insignificant, they diversified rapidly and would dominate the fauna for the rest of the Mesozoic. On the other hand, the therapsids, which included the ancestors of mammals, decreased in both size and diversity, and would remain relatively small until the extinction of the dinosaurs.

Conodonts were present in Triassic marine sediments. Paragondolella polygnathiformis appeared at the base of the Carnian Stage, and is considered a characteristic species. A partial list of Carnian vertebrates is given below. Many Carnian vertebrates are found in Santa Maria Formation rocks of the Paleorrota geopark.

== Classic localities and Lagerstätten ==
The lower Carnian fauna of the San Cassiano Formation (Dolomites, northern Italy) has been studied since the 19th century. Fossiliferous localities are many, and are distributed mostly in the surroundings of Cortina d'Ampezzo and in the high Badia Valley, near the village of San Cassiano, after which the formation was named. This fauna is extremely diverse, including ammonoids, gastropods, bivalves, echinoderms, calcareous sponge, corals, brachiopods, and a variety of less common fossils. A collection of this fauna is exposed in the "Museo delle Regole", a museum in Cortina d'Ampezzo.

The Ischigualasto Formation of the Ischigualasto-Villa Unión Basin in northwestern Argentina yielded a very important vertebrate association, including the oldest dinosaurian assemblage.

The Lagerstätte of the Madygen Formation in Kyrgyzstan has provided over 20,000 fossil insects, vertebrates and flora.

=== Notable Formations ===
- Chañares Formation (Argentina)
- Denmark Hill Insect Bed (Queensland, Australia)
- Ischigualasto Formation (Argentina)
- Los Rastros Formation (Argentina)
- Lower Maleri Formation (Telangana, India)
- Molteno Formation (South Africa)
- Potrerillos Formation (Argentina)
- Santa Maria Formation (Rio Grande do Sul, Brazil)
- Stuttgart Formation (Germany)
- Tiki Formation (Madhya Pradesh, India)
- Xiaowa Formation / Wayao Member of the Falang Formation (Guizhou and Yunnan, China)
- Zhuganpo Formation / Zhuganpo Member of the Falang Formation (late Ladinian - early Carnian) (Guizhou and Yunnan, China)

== See also ==
- Triassic Boreal Ocean Delta Plain
