= Sirenites =

Sirenites Temporal range: Upper Triassic

Scientific classification
- Domain: Eukaryota
- Kingdom: Animalia
- Phylum: Mollusca
- Class: Cephalopoda
- Subclass: †Ammonoidea
- Order: †Ceratitida
- Family: †Trachyceratidae
- Subfamily: †Sirenitinae
- Genus: †Sirenites; Mojsisovics, 1893

Genus of molluscs (fossil)

Sirenites is a genus of ammonoid cephalopods from the Upper Triassic included in the Ceratitida, and type for the trachyceratid subfamily Sirenitinae.

Sirenites has a compressed shell with distinct furrow running along the outer rim. Sides of the whorls are flattened to convex and covered with sigmoidal ribs that split on tubercles near the outer shoulder. there are two rows of tubercles on whorl sides and one on the inner, or umbilicle, shoulder. Although Sirenites is a ceratitid ammonoid, it suture is ammonitic.
