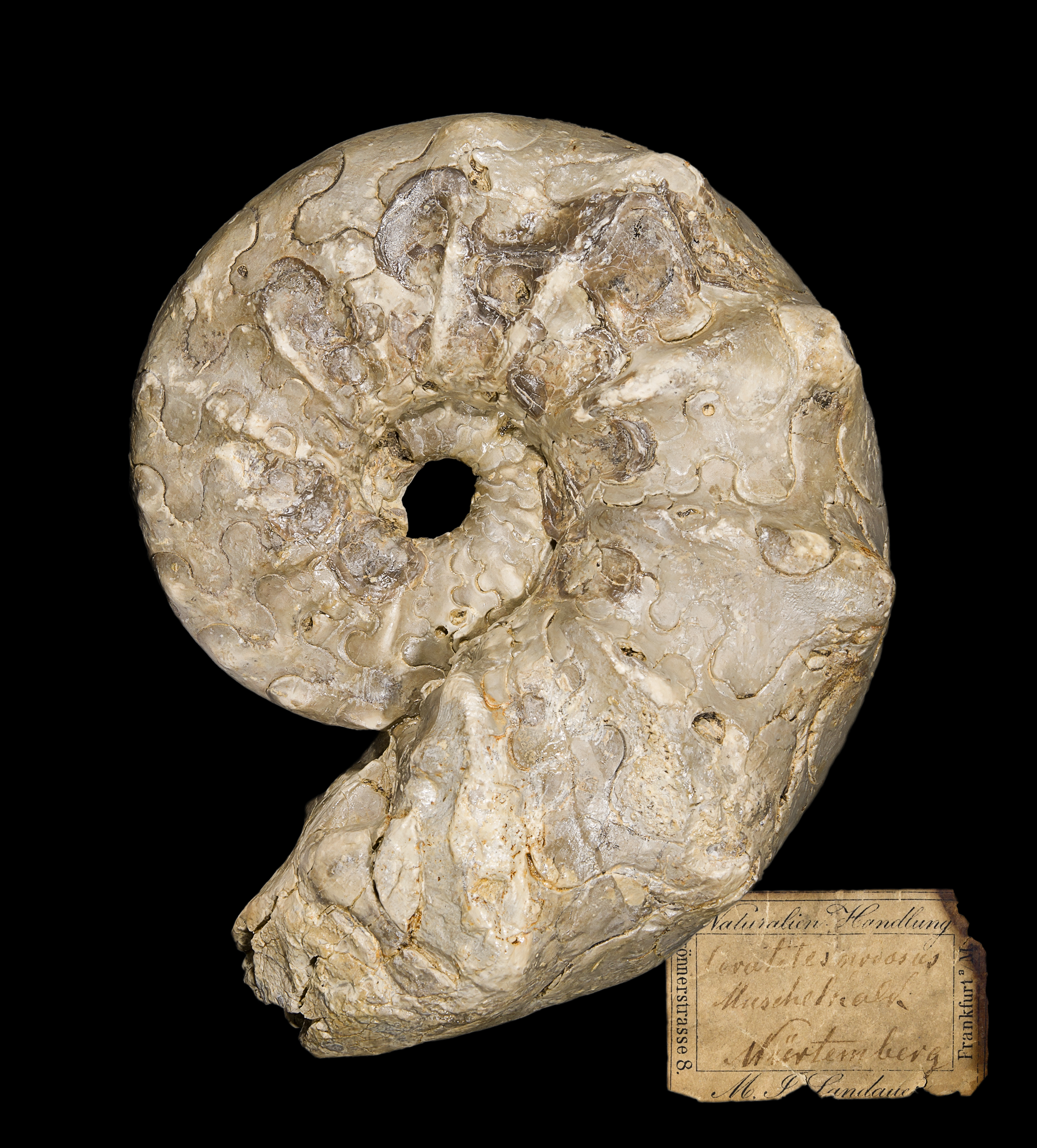
- Ceratites nodosus, Upper Muschelkalk - Germany

Scientific classification
- Kingdom: Animalia
- Phylum: Mollusca
- Class: Cephalopoda
- Subclass: †Ammonoidea
- Order: †Ceratitida; Hyatt, 1884

Superfamilies
- See text

= Ceratitida =

Ceratitida Temporal range: Middle Permian - Late Triassic

Extinct order of molluscs

Ceratitida is an order that contains almost all ammonoid cephalopod genera from the Triassic as well as ancestral forms from the Upper Permian, the exception being the phylloceratids which gave rise to the great diversity of post-Triassic ammonites.

Ceratitids overwhelmingly produced planospirally coiled discoidal shells that may be evolute with inner whorls exposed or involute with only the outer whorl showing. In a few later forms the shell became subglobular, in others, trochoidal or uncoiled. Sutures are typically ceratitic, with smooth saddles and serrate or digitized lobes. In a few the sutures are goniatitic while in others they are ammonitic.

== Taxonomy ==
- Ceratitida
  - Ceratitoidea
  - Choristoceratoidea
  - Clydonitoidea
  - Danubitoidea
  - Dinaritoidea
  - Lobitoidea
  - Meekoceratoidea
  - Megaphyllitoidea
  - Nathorstitoidea
  - Noritoidea
  - Otoceratoidea
  - Pinacoceratoidea
  - Ptychitoidea
  - Sageceratoidea
  - Tropitoidea
  - Xenodiscoidea

Only eight superfamilies are shown in the Treatise on Invertebrate Paleontology, Part L,(1957), the Otocerataceae, Noritaceae, Ceratitaceae, Arcestaceae, Clydonitaceae, Lobitaceae, Ptychitaceae, and Tropitaceae, in text sequence. The other 10 have been added since, derived from within the original eight.
