= List of the prehistoric life of Nevada =

This list of the prehistoric life of Nevada contains the various prehistoric life-forms whose fossilized remains have been reported from within the US state of Nevada.

== Precambrian ==
The Paleobiology Database records no known occurrences of Precambrian fossils in Alabama.

== Paleozoic ==
=== Selected Paleozoic taxa of Nevada ===
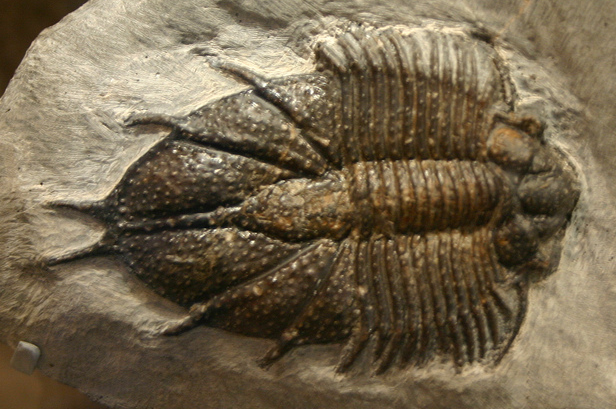
- Fossil of the Silurian-Middle Devonian trilobite Acanthopyge
  †Acanthopyge
- †Acmarhachis
  - †Acmarhachis typicalis
- †Acodus
- †Acrothyra
- †Acutichiton
- †Adamsoceras
  - †Agnostotes clavata – or unidentified comparable form
- †Agnostus
- †Agoniatites
- †Amorphognathus
- †Amphiscapha
- †Ampyx – tentative report
- †Ampyx
- †Anabarella
- † Ananias
- †Anataphrus
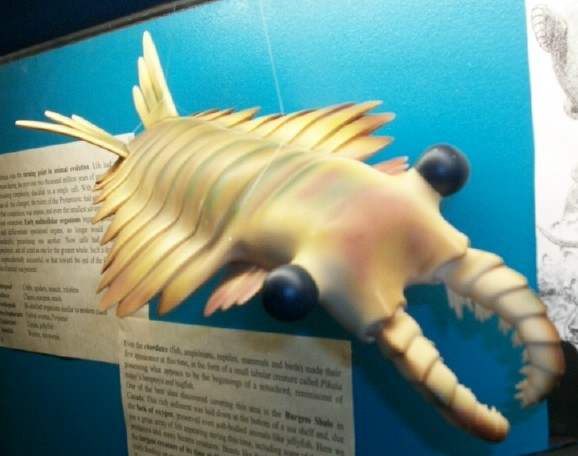
- Restorative model of the Cambrian arthropod Anomalocaris
  †Anomalocaris
- †Anomphalus
  - †Anomphalus jaggerius – type locality for species
- †Apatolichas
- †Archaeocidaris
- †Athyris
  - †Athyris lamellosa
- †Atrypa
  - †Atrypa parva – or unidentified comparable form
  - †Atrypa reticularis
- †Aulopora
- †Aviculopecten
- †Avonia
- †Bactroceras
- †Baltoceras
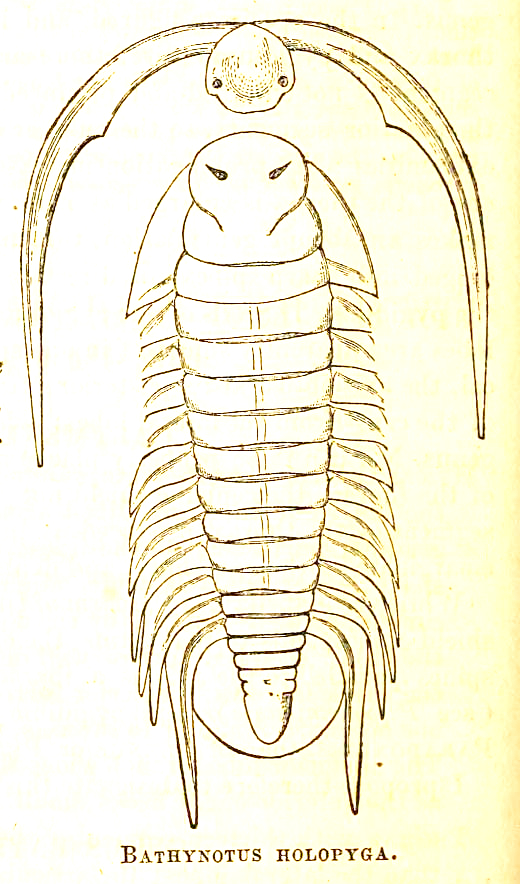
- Illustration of a fossil of the Cambrian trilobite Bathynotus
  †Bathynotus
- †Bathyuriscus
- †Bellerophon
  - †Bellerophon needlensis – type locality for species
- †Benthamaspis
- †Biceratops – type locality for genus
- †Biciragnostus
- † Bija
- †Bimuria
- †Bolbocephalus – tentative report
- †Bolbolenellus
- †Bradyfallotaspis
- †Brevibelus
- †Bristolia
- †Brongniartella
- †Brunsia
- †Bumastus
- †Calymene
- †Calyptaulax
- †Camarotoechia
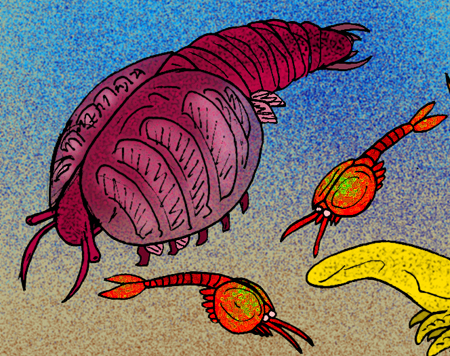
- Life restoration of the Cambrian arthropod Canadaspis (left)
  †Canadaspis
- †Cancelloceras
  - †Cancelloceras elegans – or unidentified comparable form
- †Caninia
- †Carinamala
- †Carolinites
- †Catenipora
- †Cavusgnathus
- †Cedaria
- †Ceratocephala – tentative report
- †Ceraurinella
- †Ceraurinus
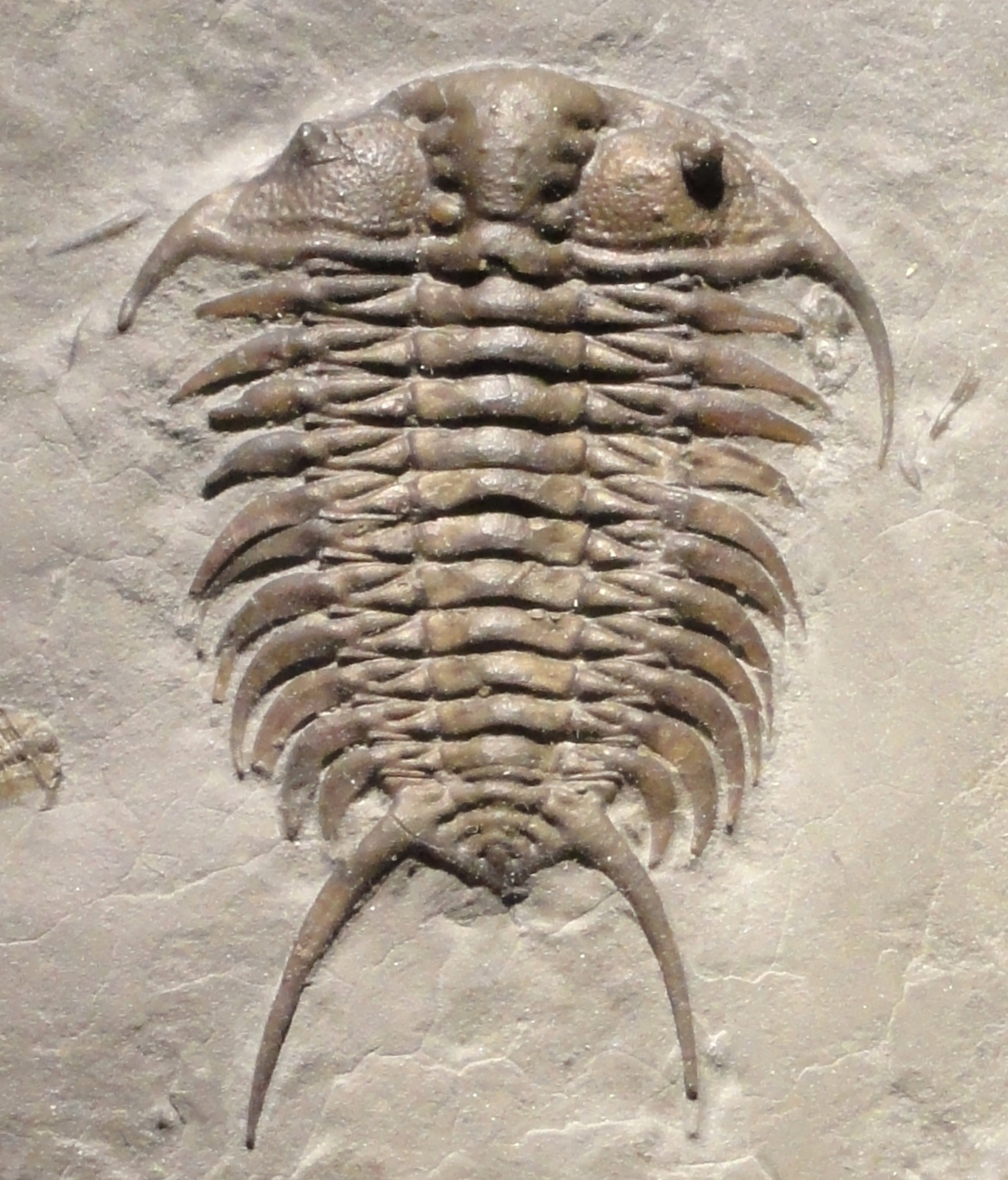
- Fossil of the Middle-Late Ordovician trilobite Ceraurus
  †Ceraurus
- †Chancelloria
- †Chancia
- †Chonetes
  - †Chonetes logani
- †Cladochonus
- †Cladodus
- †Cleiothyridina
  - †Cleiothyridina ciriacksi
  - †Cleiothyridina deroissyi
  - †Cleiothyridina elegans
  - †Cleiothyridina orbicularis
- †Climacograptus
  - †Climacograptus innotatus
  - †Climacograptus phyllophorus – or unidentified comparable form
- †Cloacaspis
- †Coleoloides
- †Columnaria
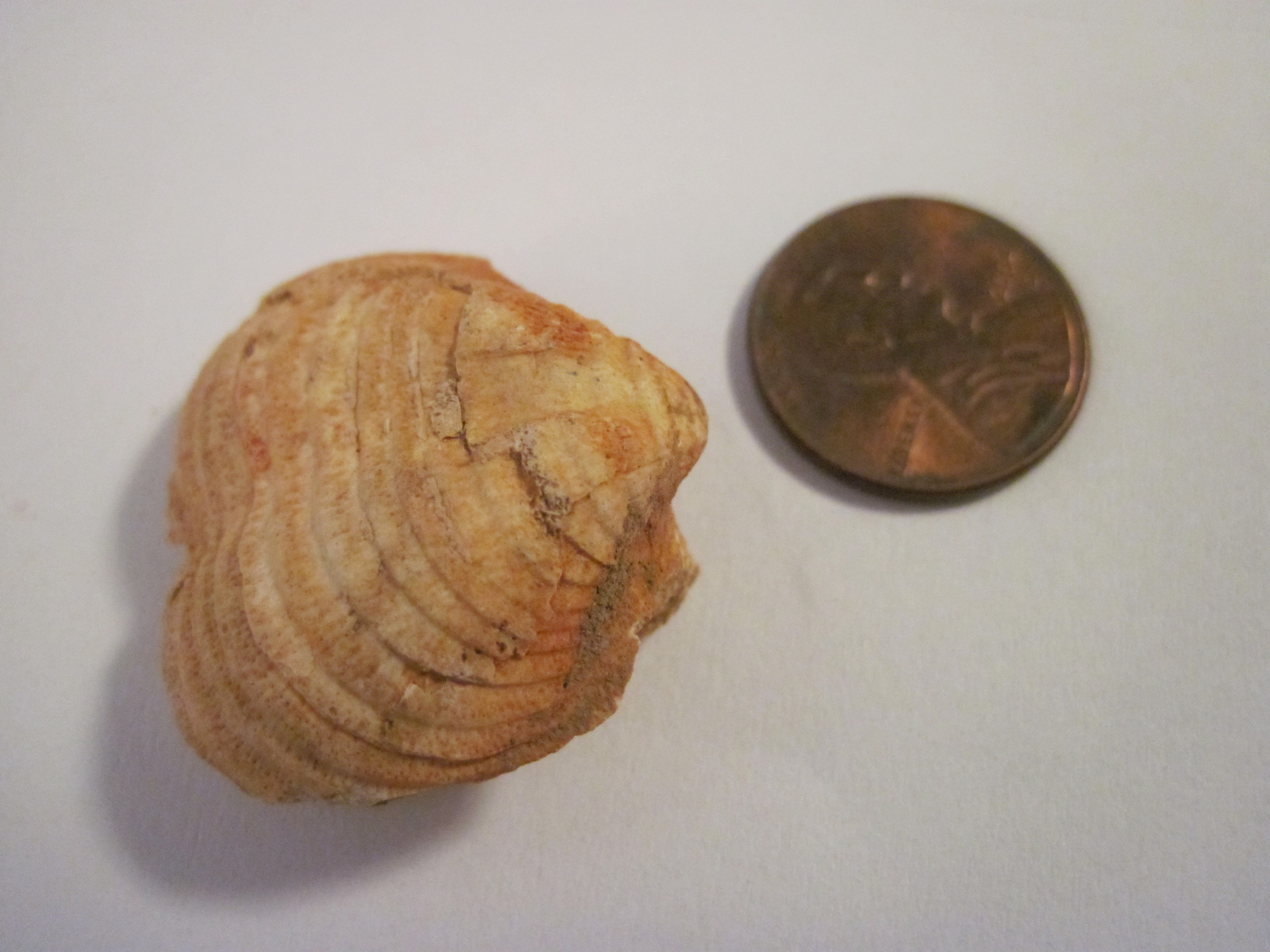
- Fossilized shell of the Late Devonian-Permian brachiopod Composita
  †Composita
  - †Composita apheles – or unidentified comparable form
  - †Composita mexicana
  - †Composita mira
  - †Composita ovata
  - †Composita parasulcata
  - †Composita subquadrata
  - †Composita subtilita
  - †Composita trinuclea
- †Conchidium
- †Conocardium
- †Constellaria
- †Coosia
- †Cordylodus
- †Cornuodus
- †Cravenoceras
- †Culumbodina
- †Curtoceras
- †Cybelopsis
- †Cymbidium
- †Cypricardinia
- †Cyptendoceras
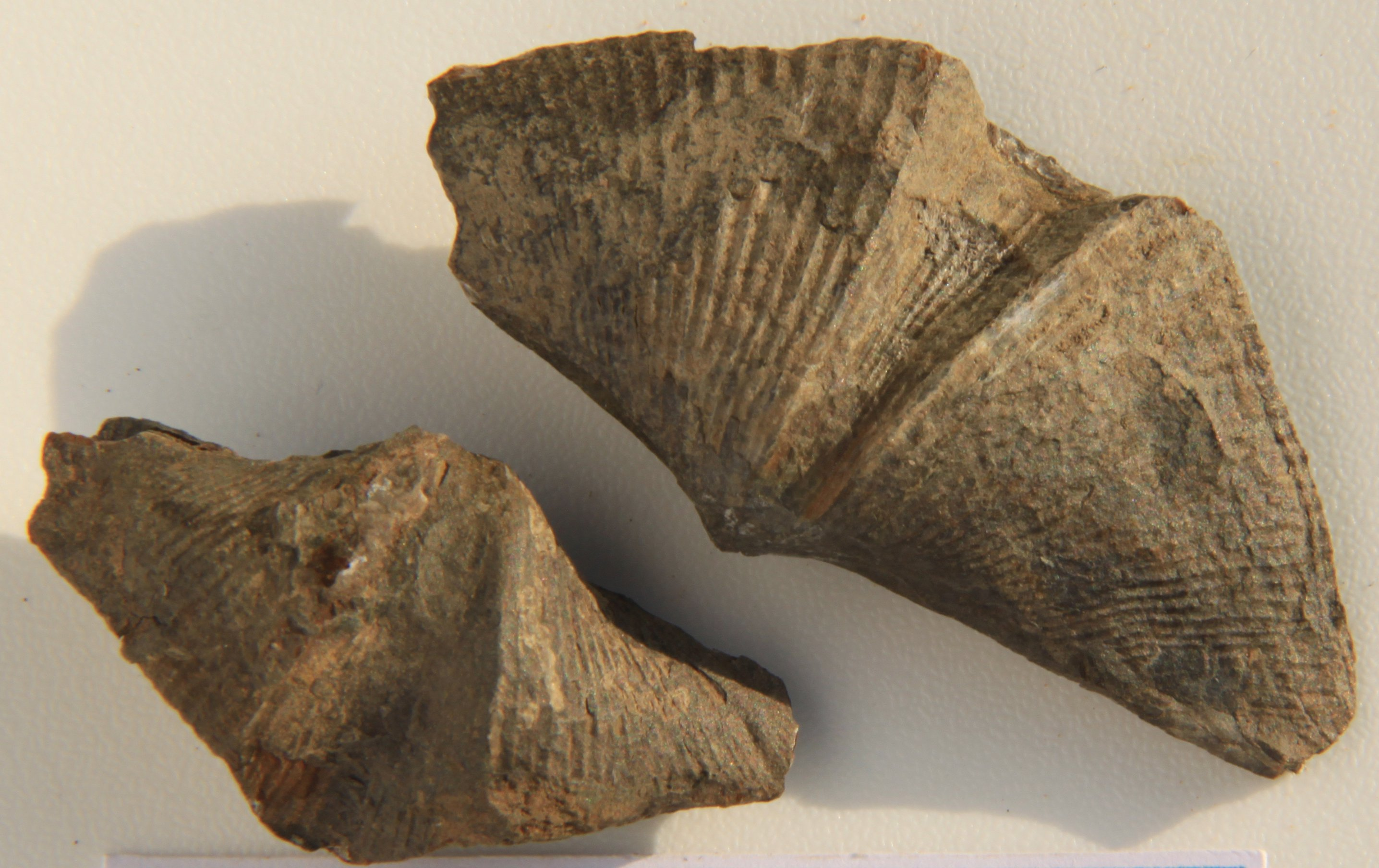
- Fossilized shells of the Middle-Late Devonian brachiopod Cyrtospirifer
  †Cyrtospirifer
  - †Cyrtospirifer whitneyi
- †Cystodictya
- †Dalmanites
- †Davidsonia
- Dentalium
- †Dicoelosia
- †Dictyonema
- †Didymograptus
- †Dimeropygiella
- †Diplograptus
- †Distomodus
- †Earlandia
- †Echinaria
- †Edmondia
- †Egania – type locality for genus
- †Ehmaniella
- †Elrathina
- †Emmonsia
- †Encrinuroides
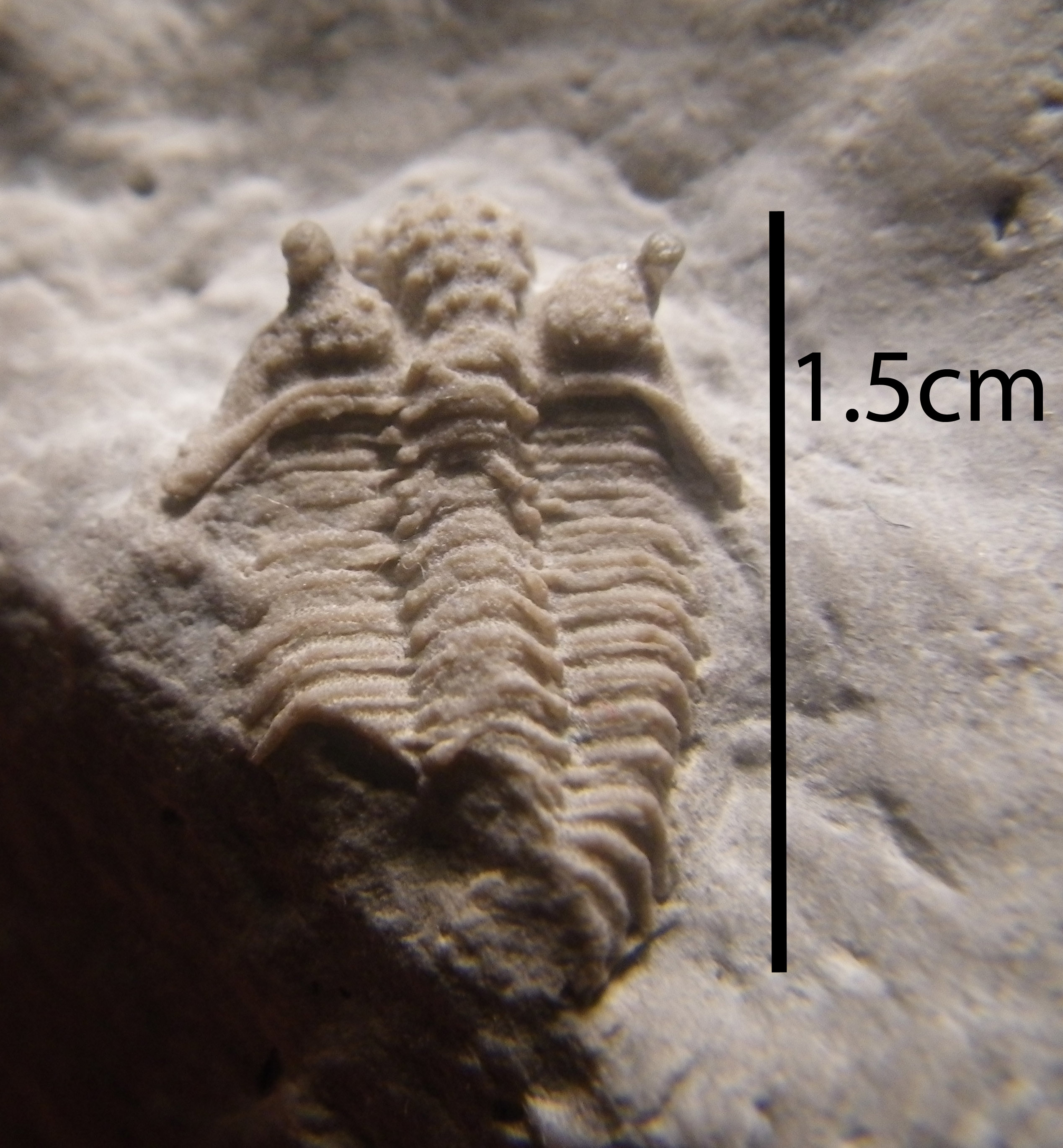
- Fossil of the Middle Ordovician-Early Devonian trilobite Encrinurus
  †Encrinurus
- †Eospirifer
- †Epiphyton
- †Esmeraldina
- †Ethmophyllum
- †Euomphalus
- †Fallotaspis
- †Favosites
- †Fenestella
- †Flexicalymene
- †Fremontia
- †Geragnostus
- †Geraldinella
- †Girvanella
- †Glaphurochiton – tentative report
  - †Glyptagnostus reticulatus
- †Gnathodus
- †Gogia
- †Goniatites
- †Gracianella
- †Grandinasus
- †Gypospirifer
- †Halysites
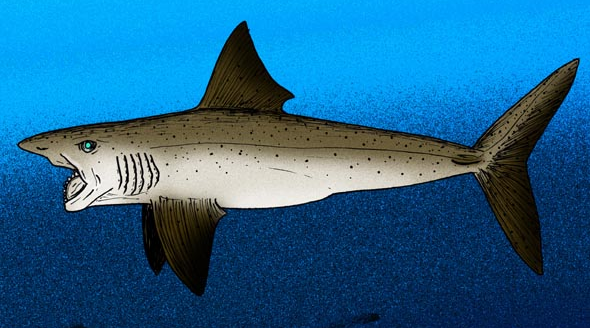
- Life restoration of the Permian Chimaera relative Helicoprion
  †Helicoprion
- †Heliomera
- †Helminthochiton
- †Hintzeia
- †Holmiella
- †Homagnostus
- †Hunnebergia – tentative report
- †Hyolithellus
- †Hyolithes
- †Hypodicranotus
- †Iapetognathus
- †Icriodus
- †Illaenus
- †Ingria
- †Innitagnostus
- †Irvingella
- †Isograptus
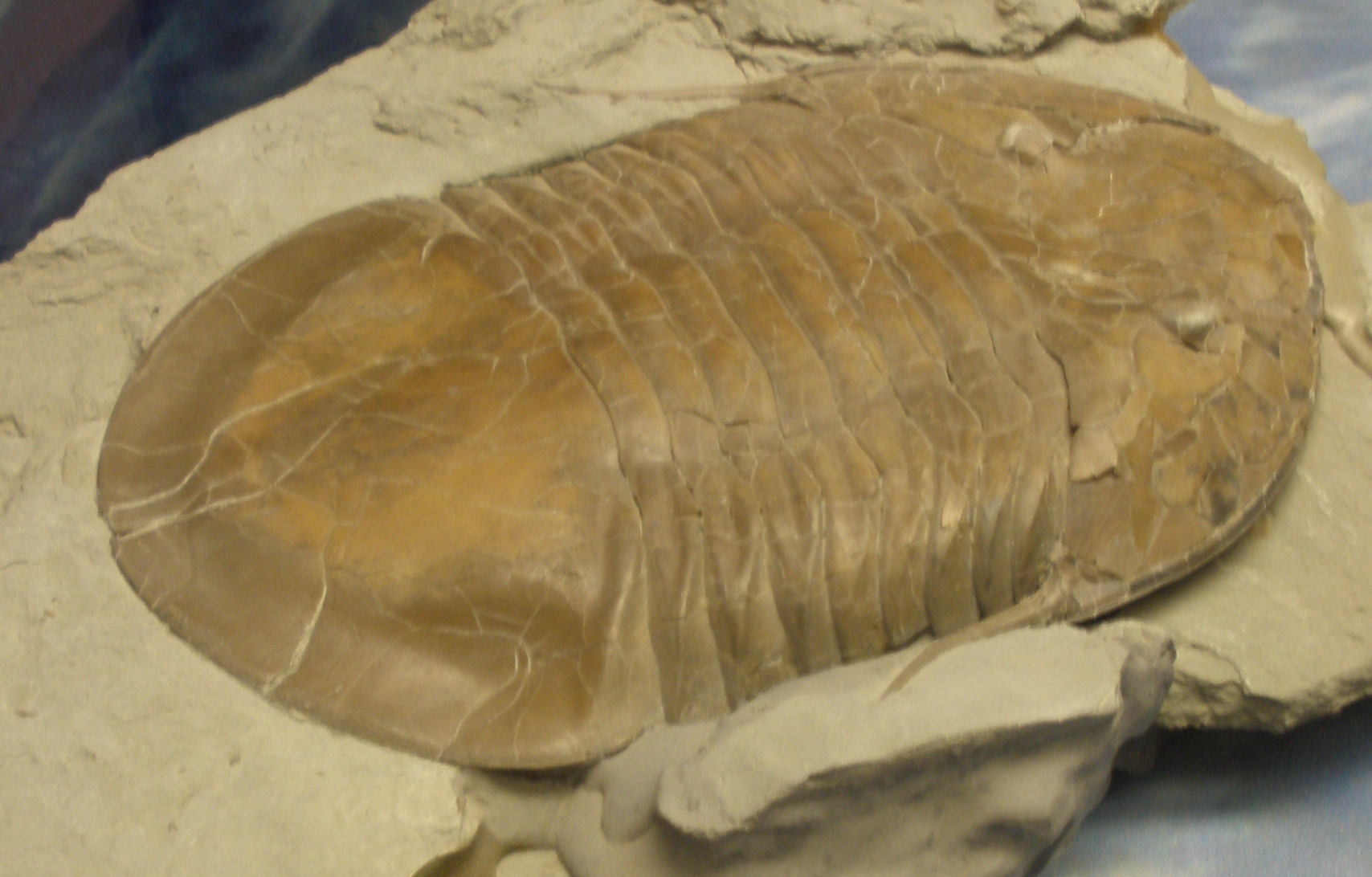
- Fossil of the Middle-Late Ordovician giant trilobite Isotelus.
  †Isotelus
- †Jeffersonia
- †Kanoshia
- †Kawina
- †Komaspidella
- †Komia
- †Kootenia
- †Krausella
- †Lachnostoma
- †Ladatheca
- †Lehua
- †Leonardoceras
- †Leonaspis
- †Lingula
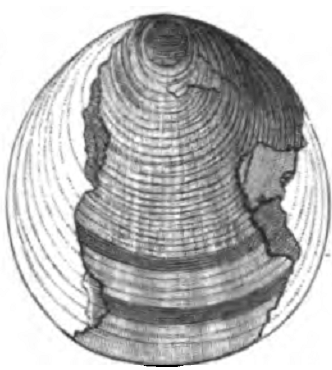
- Illustration of a fossilized shell of the Cambrian-Late Ordovician brachiopod Lingulella
  †Lingulella
- †Lonchodomas
- †Lotagnostus
  - †Lotagnostus trisectus – or unidentified comparable form
- †Martinia
- †Megalaspidella – tentative report
- †Megalaspides
- †Megistaspis
- †Meristella
- †Meristina
- †Metacoceras
- †Metaplasia
- †Michelinoceras
- †Micromitra
- †Microplasma
- †Modiolus
- †Monograptus
  - †Monograptus thomasi
  - †Monograptus yukonensis
- †Murchisonia
- †Nardophyllum
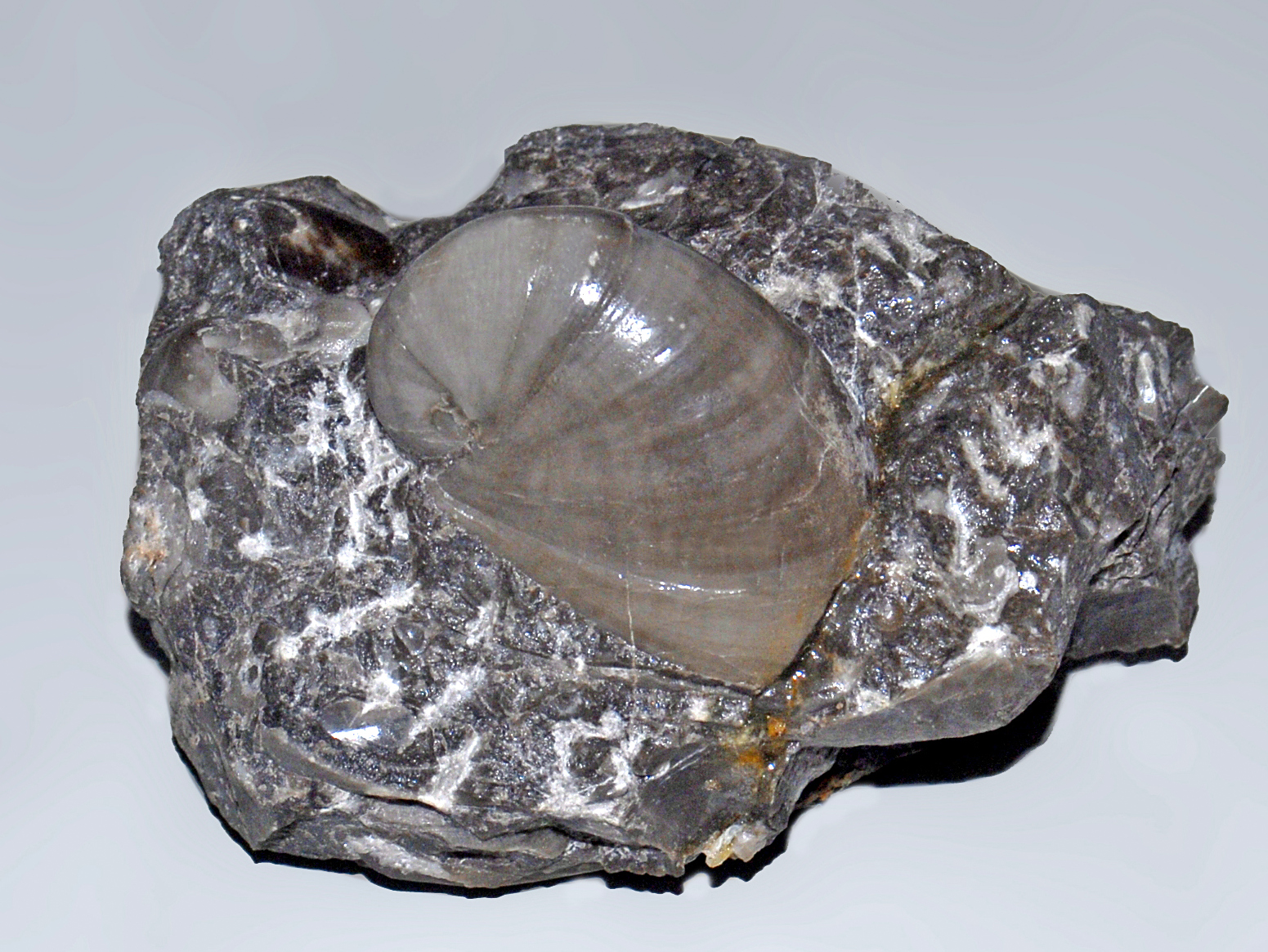
- Fossilized shell of the Early Devonian – Triassic sea snail Naticopsis
  †Naticopsis
  - †Naticopsis glomerosa – type locality for species
  - †Naticopsis inornata
  - †Naticopsis kaibabensis
- †Neospirifer
  - †Neospirifer cameratus
  - †Neospirifer dunbari
  - †Neospirifer goreii
  - †Neospirifer latus – or unidentified comparable form
  - †Neospirifer triplicatus
- †Nephrolenellus
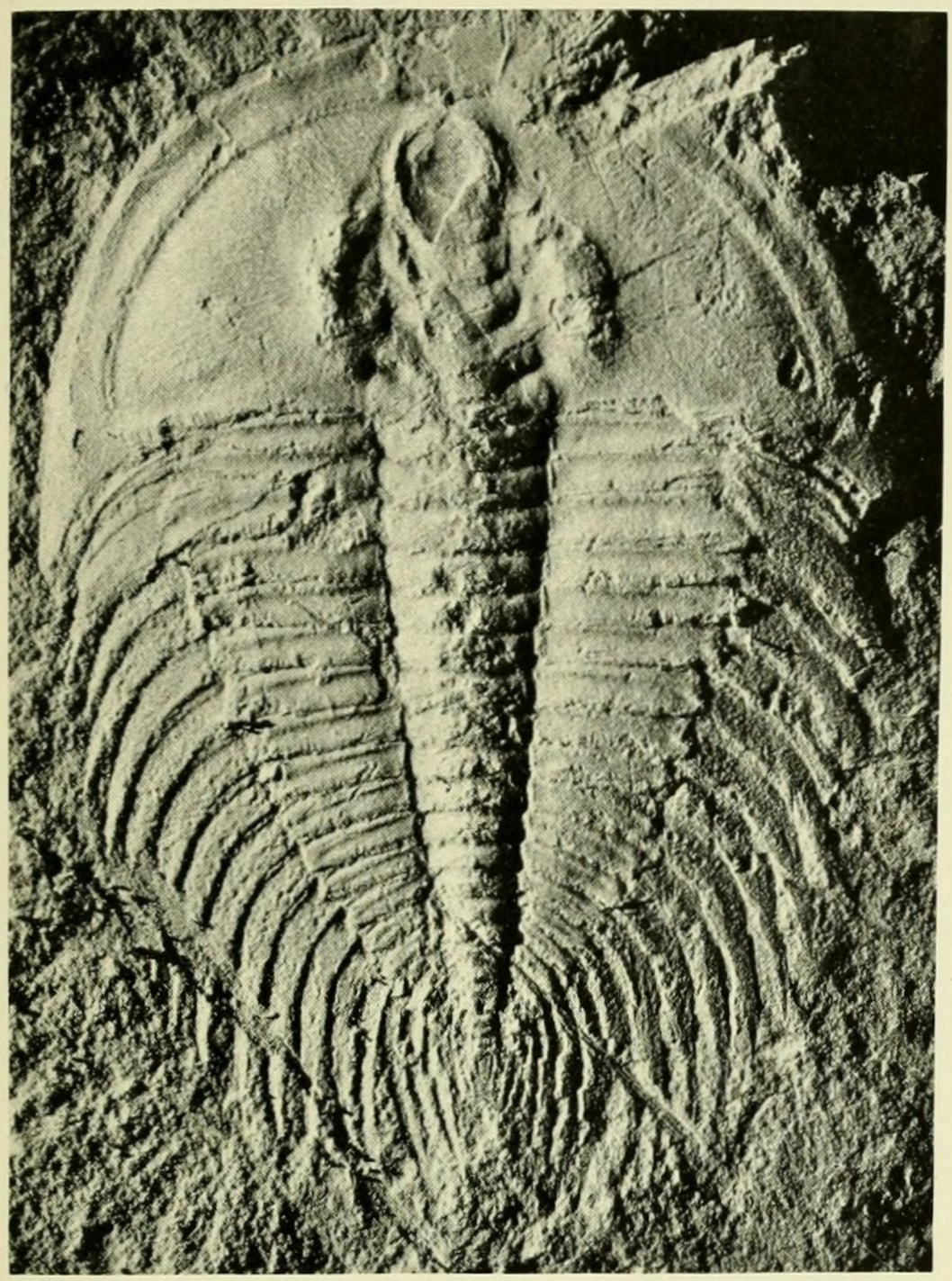
- Fossil of the Cambrian trilobite Nevadella
  †Nevadella
- †Nevadia
- †Niobe
- †Nisusia – tentative report
- †Noblella
- †Nuculoidea
- †Obolella
- †Obolus
- †Ogygopsis
- †Olenellus
  - †Olenellus fowleri – type locality for species
- †Olenoides
- †Olenus
- †Opipeuter
- †Orthoceras
- †Oryctocephalus
  - †Oryctocephalus indicus
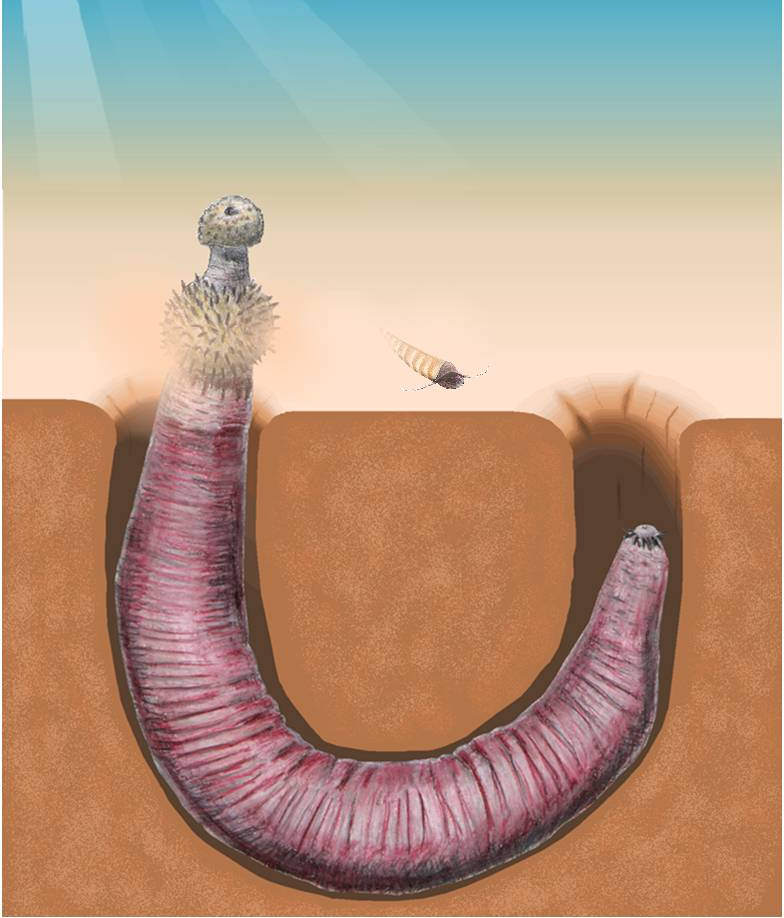
- Life restoration of the Cambrian priapulid worm relative Ottoia
  †Ottoia
- †Oulodus
- †Ovatoryctocara – tentative report
- †Ozarkodina
- †Pachyphyllum
- †Paedeumias
- †Pagetia
- †Paladin
- †Palmettaspis – type locality for genus
- †Parafusulina
- †Paranevadella
- †Paterina
- †Peachella
- †Pelagiella
- †Pentamerus
- †Pentlandia
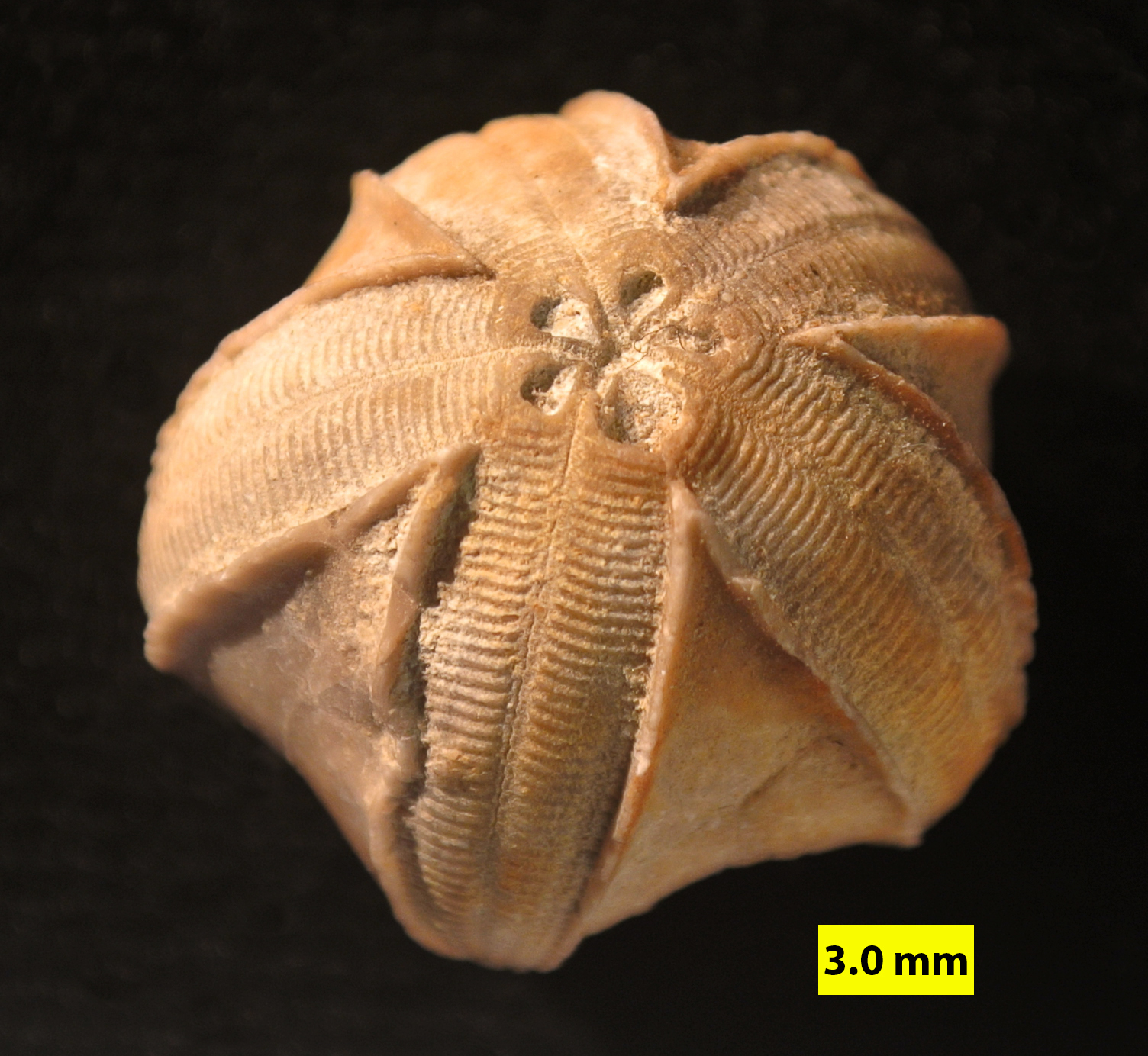
- Fossilized theca of the Carboniferous blastoid echinoderm ("sea bud") Pentremites
  †Pentremites
- †Periodon
- †Permocalculus
- †Peronopsis
- †Perspicaris
- †Phacops
- †Phalacroma
- †Phillipsia
- †Phragmophora
- †Phyllograptus
- Pinna
- †Platyceras
- †Platycrinites
- †Platystrophia
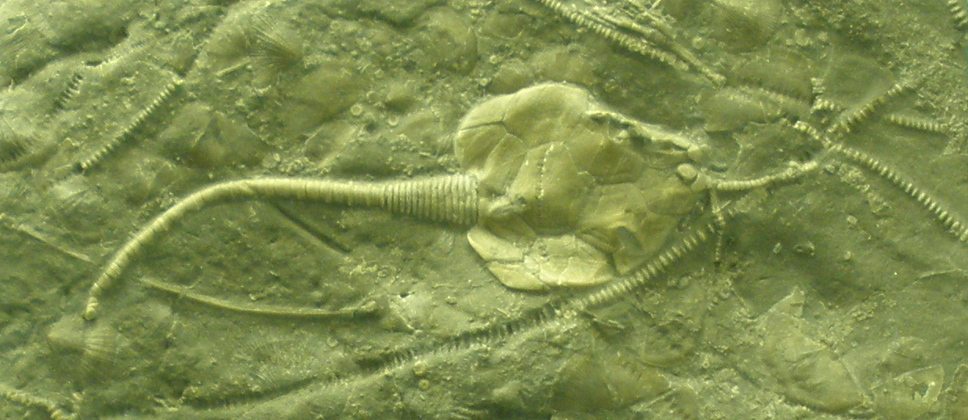
- Fossil of the Late Ordovician cystoid echinoderm Pleurocystites
  †Pleurocystites
- †Polygnathus
  - †Polygnathus angusticostatus
  - †Polygnathus angustipennatus – or unidentified comparable form
  - †Polygnathus costatus
  - †Polygnathus eiflius
  - †Polygnathus linguiformis
  - †Polygnathus parawebbi
  - †Polygnathus pseudofoliatus
- †Posidonia
- †Prodentalium
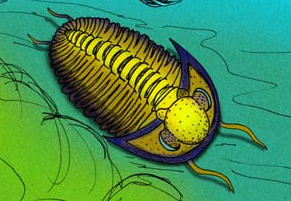
- Restoration of the Silurian trilobite Proetus
  †Proetus
- †Profallotaspis – tentative report
- †Protochonetes
- †Protospongia
- †Ptychagnostus
  - †Ptychagnostus atavus
- †Punka
- †Quadratia
- †Raymondaspis
- †Rayonnoceras
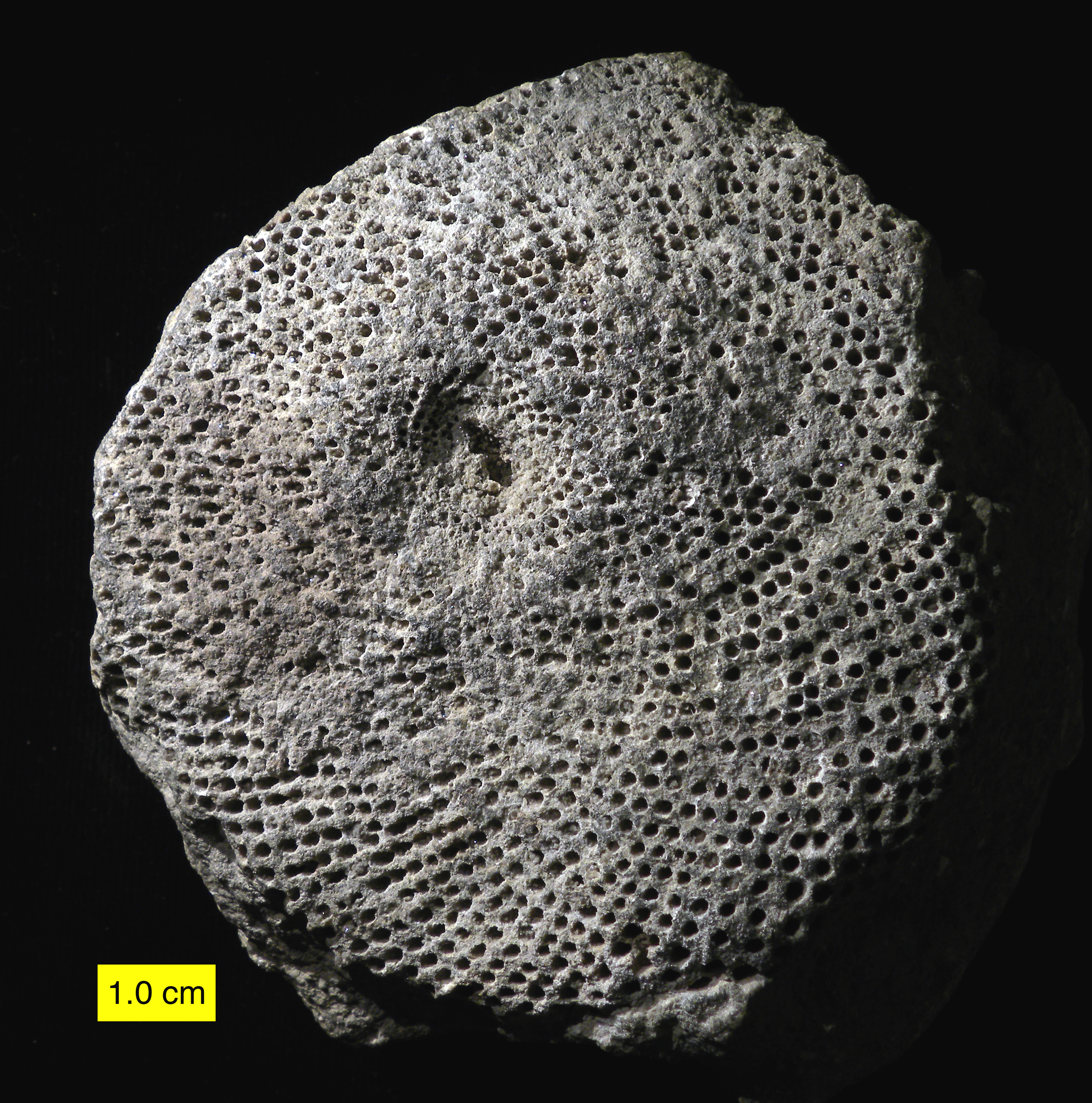
- Fossil of the Early Ordovician-Permian benthic alga Receptaculites
  †Receptaculites
- †Remopleurides
- †Rensselaeria
- †Repinaella
- †Rhabdiferoceras – type locality for genus
- †Rioceras – tentative report
- †Rossodus – tentative report
- †Sabellidites
- †Sallya
- †Salterella
- †Schwagerina
- †Siphonodendron
- †Skenidioides
- †Sowerbyella
- †Spathognathodus
- †Sphaerocodium
- †Sphaerocoryphe
- †Sphenothallus
- †Spirifer
  - †Spirifer centronatus
  - †Spirifer opimus
  - †Spirifer rockymontanus
- †Spiriferina
- Spirorbis
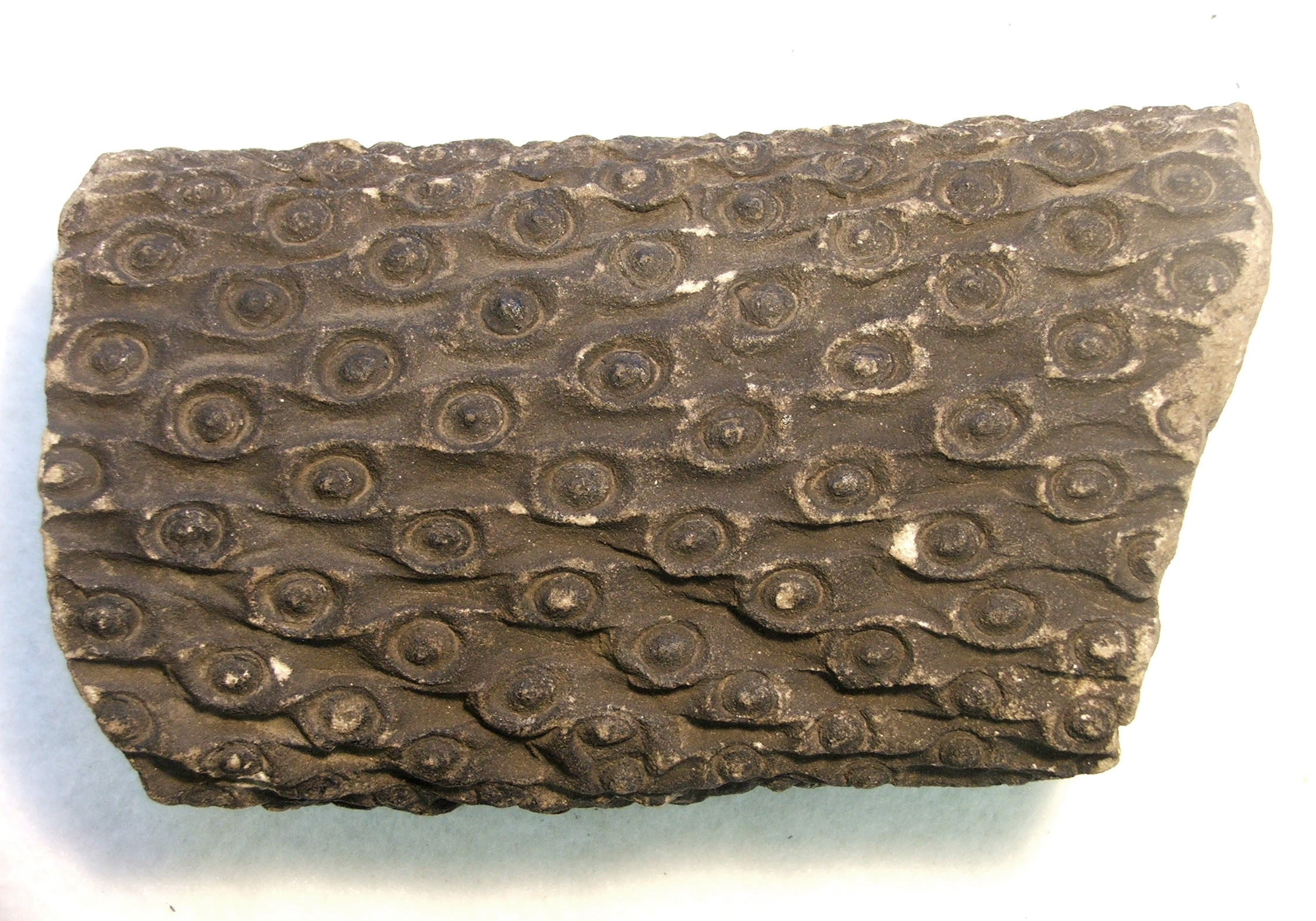
- Fossil of the Carboniferous-Permian tree-like club moss relative rhizome Stigmaria
  †Stigmaria
- †Streptognathodus
- †Streptosolen
- †Stringocephalus
- †Strophomena
- †Stylonema – tentative report
- †Subulites
- †Syringopora
- †Tentaculites
- †Tetragraptus
- †Tetrataxis
- †Thoracocare
- †Triarthrus
- †Trinodus
- †Trocholites
- †Tuzoia
- †Tylonautilus
- †Uraloceras
  - †Uraloceras burtiense
  - †Uraloceras involutum
  - †Uraloceras nevadense – type locality for species
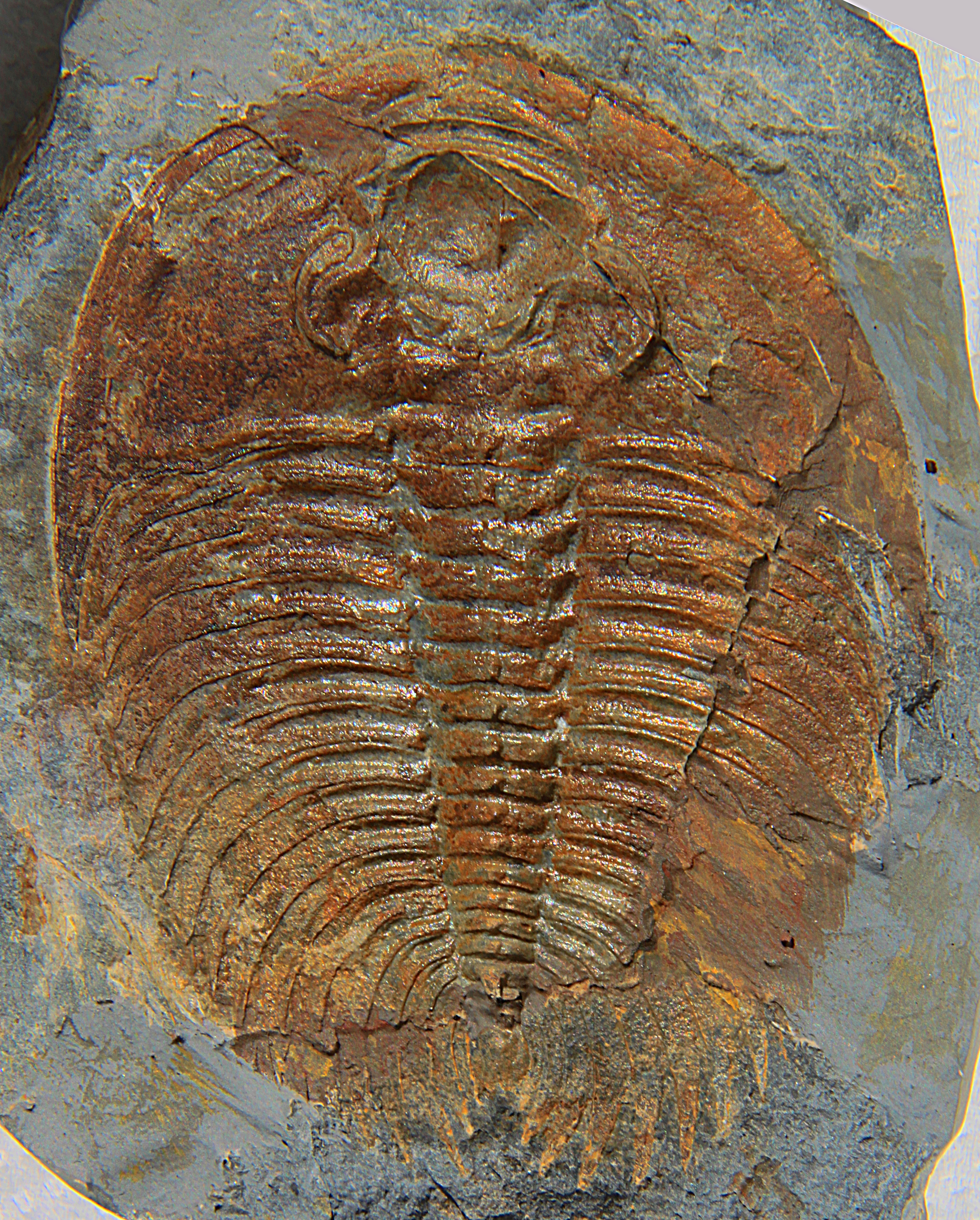
- Fossil of the Cambrian trilobite Wanneria
  †Wanneria
- †Watsonella
- †Westergaardites
- †Worthenia
- †Wutinoceras
- Yoldia
- †Youngia – tentative report
- †Zacanthoides

== Mesozoic ==
=== Selected Mesozoic taxa of Nevada ===
- †Acrochordiceras – type locality for genus
- †Acrodus
  - †Acrodus alexandrae – type locality for species
  - †Acrodus cuneocostatus – type locality for species
  - †Acrodus oreodontus – type locality for species
  - †Acrodus spitzbergensis
  - †Acrodus vermicularis – or unidentified comparable form
- †Acuminatella
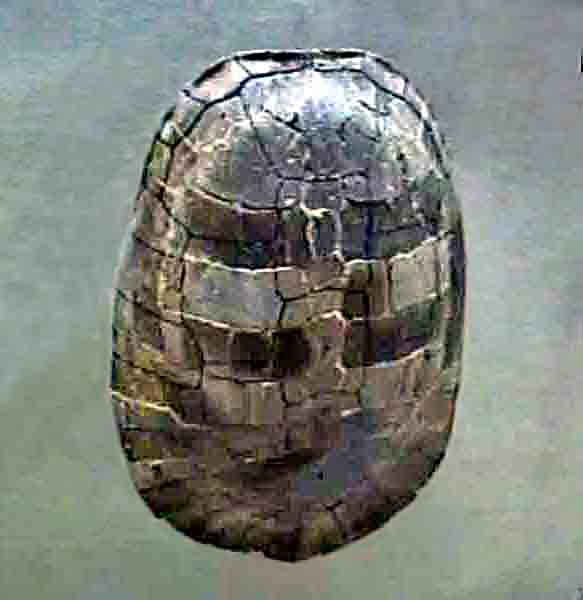
- Fossilized shell of the Early Cretaceous-Oligocene turtle Adocus
  †Adocus – or unidentified comparable form
- †Alanites
  - †Alanites costatus – type locality for species
  - †Alanites mulleri – type locality for species
  - †Alanites obesus – type locality for species
- †Alsatites
- †Anaflemingites
- †Anagymnites
- †Anagymnotoceras
- †Anasibirites
  - †Anasibirites kingianus
- †Anatropites
- †Angulaticeras
- †Anolcites
- †Aplococeras
- †Arcestes
- †Arctoceras
- †Arctohungarites
- †Arctoprionites
- †Arenicolites
- †Aspenites
- Astarte
- Asteriacites
- Atrina
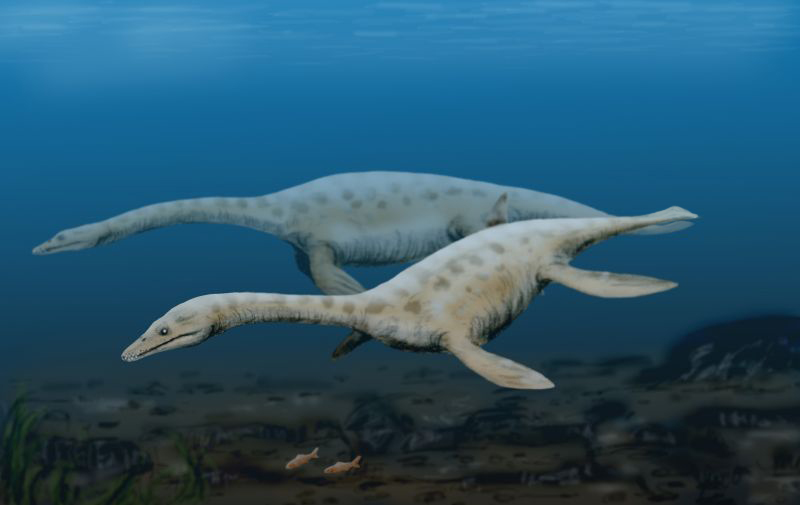
- Life restoration of the Middle Triassic plesiosaur relative Augustasaurus
  †Augustasaurus – type locality for genus
  - †Augustasaurus hagdorni – type locality for species
- †Avicularia
- †Balatonites
- †Birgeria
- †Calliconites
- Cardinia
- †Caucasorhynchia
- †Ceccaceras
- †Ceccaisculitoides
  - †Ceccaisculitoides elegans – type locality for species
- †Ceratites
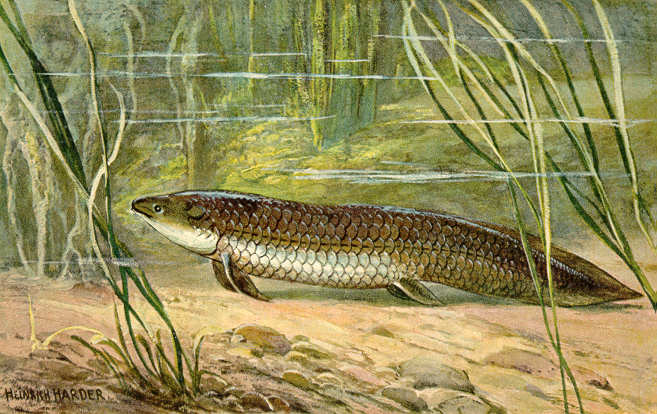
- Life restoration of the Late Triassic-Eocene lungfish Ceratodus
  †Ceratodus
- Chlamys
- †Chonespondylus
- †Claraia
  - †Claraia aurita
  - †Claraia clarai
  - †Claraia stachei
- †Colobodus
- †Coral
- Corbula – report made of unidentified related form or using admittedly obsolete nomenclature
- †Coroniceras
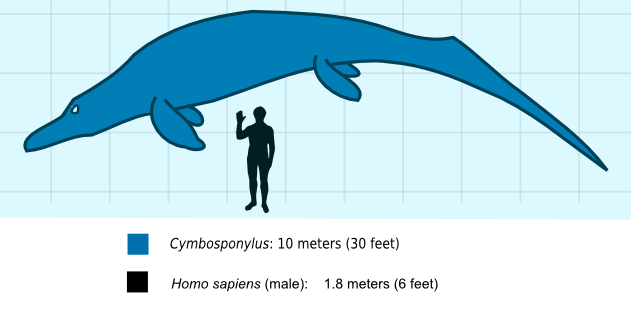
- Diagram illustrating the Middle-Late Triassic ichthyosaur Cymbospondylus with an anachronistic human to scale.
  †Cymbospondylus
  - †Cymbospondylus petrinus
  - †Cymbospondylus piscosus
- †Daonella
  - †Daonella americana – type locality for species
  - †Daonella dubia
  - †Daonella elongata – or unidentified comparable form
  - †Daonella gabbi
  - †Daonella indica – or unidentified related form
  - †Daonella lindstroemi
  - †Daonella lommeli – or unidentified comparable form
  - †Daonella lommelli – or unidentified comparable form
  - †Daonella moussoni
  - †Daonella rieberi – type locality for species
  - †Daonella sturi – or unidentified comparable form
- †Daxatina
- †Decapod
- †Ellisonia – type locality for genus
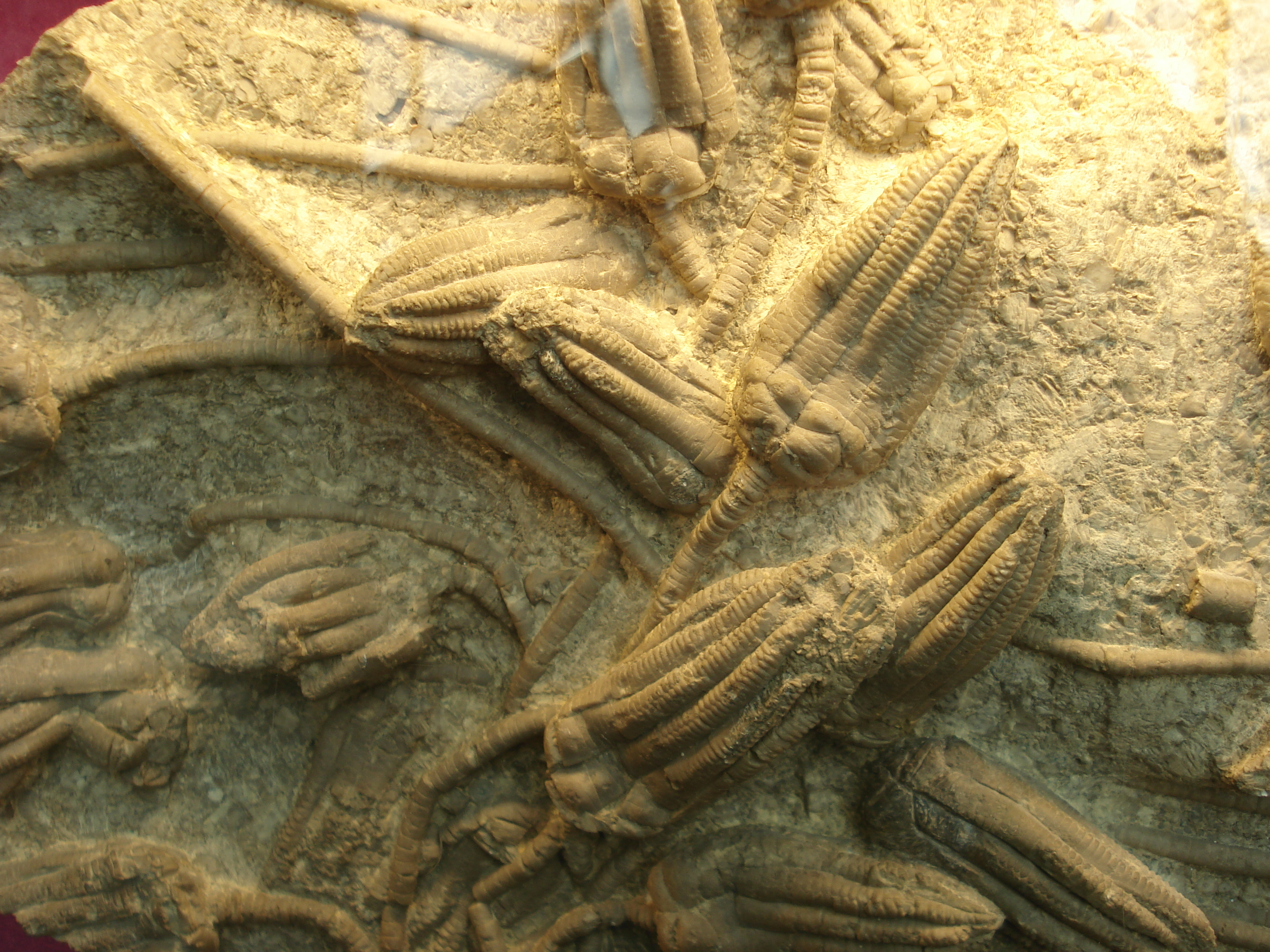
- Fossils of the Middle Triassic crinoid ("sea lily") Encrinus
  †Encrinus
- †Epigondolella
  - †Epigondolella mosheri
- †Eremites
- †Frankites
- †Frechites
- †Germanonautilus
- †Gervillaria
- †Gervillia
- †Gondolella
  - †Gondolella carinita – type locality for species
  - †Gondolella denuda – or unidentified related form
  - †Gondolella eotriassica – type locality for species
  - †Gondolella milleri – type locality for species
  - †Gondolella nevadensis – type locality for species
  - †Gondolella planata – type locality for species
- †Goniatites – report made of unidentified related form or using admittedly obsolete nomenclature
- †Gryphaea
- †Grypoceras
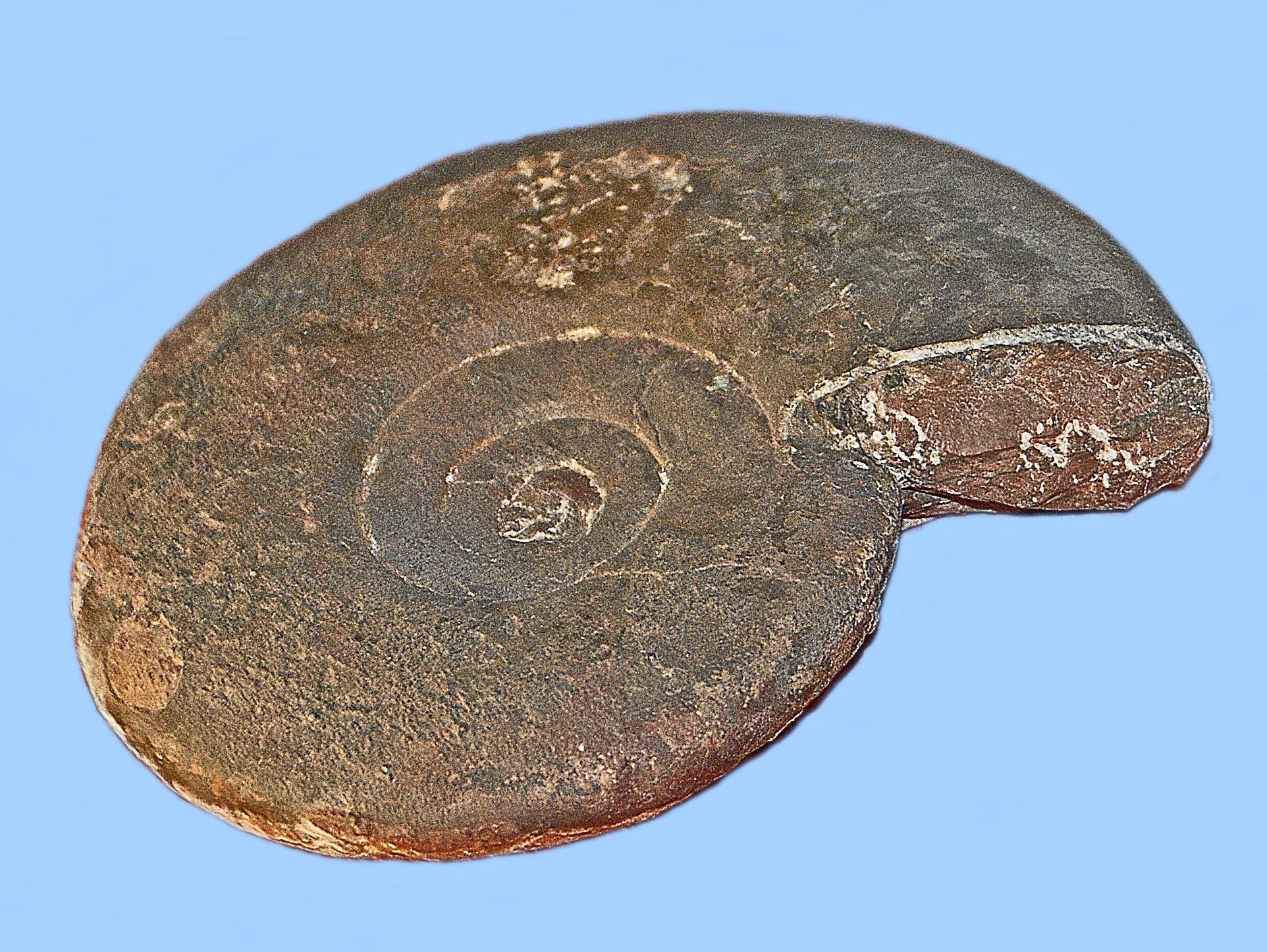
- Fossilized shell of the Triassic ammonoid cephalopod Gymnites
  †Gymnites
  - †Gymnites billingsi – type locality for species
  - †Gymnites calli – type locality for species
  - †Gymnites humboldti – or unidentified comparable form
  - †Gymnites perplanus – type locality for species
  - †Gymnites tozeri – type locality for species
  - †Gymnites tregorum – type locality for species
- †Gyrolepis – tentative report
- †Hybodus
- †Ichthyosaurus
- †Inyoites
  - †Inyoites oweni
- †Kraussodontus
- †Lecanites
- †Leiophyllites
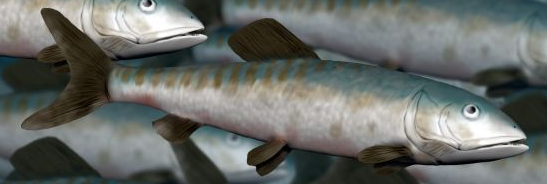
- Restoration of a school of the Middle Triassic-Early Cretaceous bony fish Leptolepis
  †Leptolepis
- Limaria
- Lopha
- †Macroelongatoolithus
- †Meekoceras
  - †Meekoceras gracilitatis
- †Metapolygnathus
- †Metophioceras
- †Michelinoceras
- †Misikella
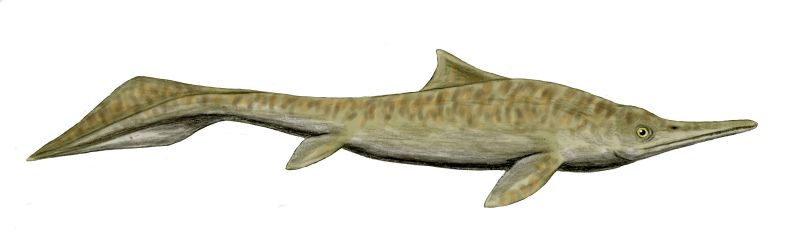
- Life restoration of the Middle Triassic ichthyosaur Mixosaurus
  †Mixosaurus
- †Modiolus
- †Monophyllites
- †Myophoria
- †Mytilus
- †Naomichelys
- †Neogondolella
- †Neomegalodon
- †Neophyllites – or unidentified comparable form
- †Nerinea
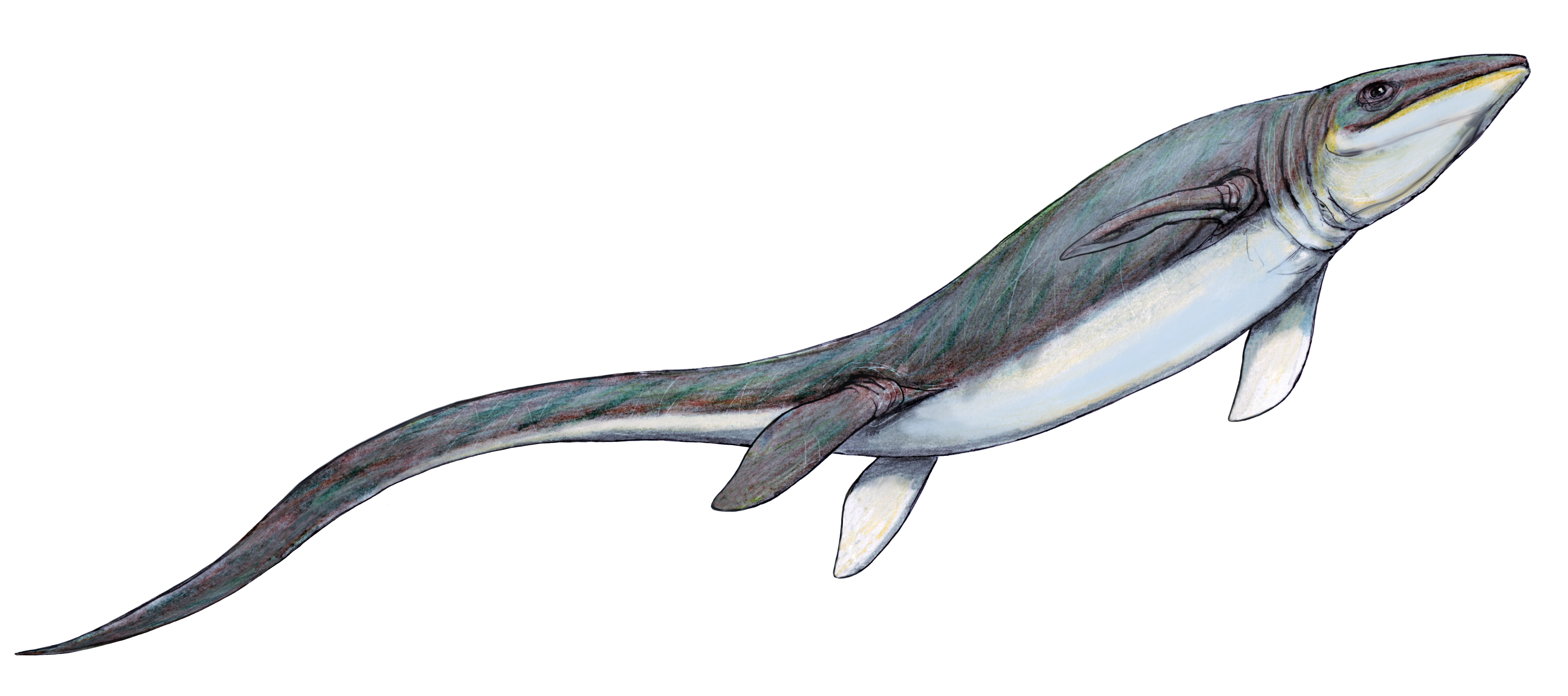
- Life restoration of the Middle-Late Triassic ichthyosaur Omphalosaurus
  †Omphalosaurus – type locality for genus
  - †Omphalosaurus nevadanus – type locality for species
- †Ophiceras
- †Orthoceras
- Ostrea
- †Oulodus
- †Owenites
  - †Owenites koeneni
- †Oxytoma
- †Ozarkodina
- †Palaeospinax – tentative report
- †Paralepidotus – tentative report
- †Paranautilus
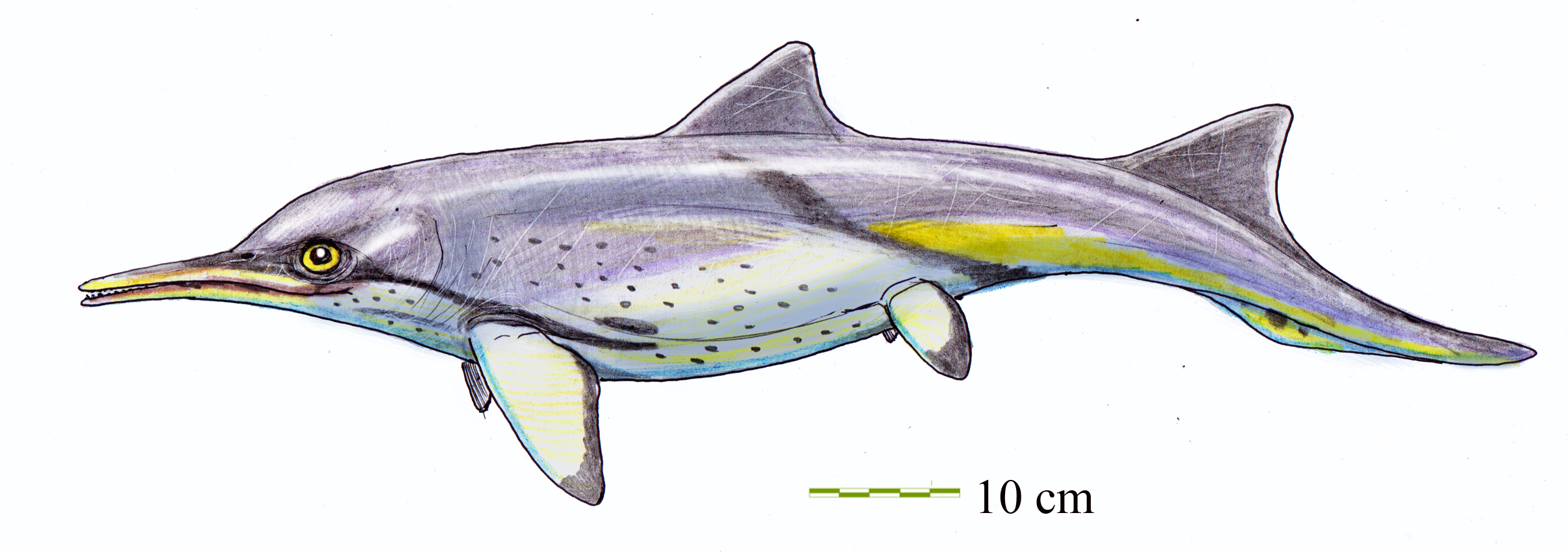
- Life restoration of the Triassic ichthyosaur Phalarodon
  †Phalarodon
  - †Phalarodon fraasi
- Pholadomya
- Pinna
- †Plagiostoma
- †Planolites
- †Pleuronautilus
- Plicatula
- †Posidonia
- †Proclydonautilus
- †Protrachyceras
- †Psiloceras
- †Ptychites
- †Ptycholepis – tentative report
- †Rhacophyllites
- †Rhaetina
- †Rhynchonella – report made of unidentified related form or using admittedly obsolete nomenclature
- †Saurichthys
- †Schlotheimia
- †Shonisaurus
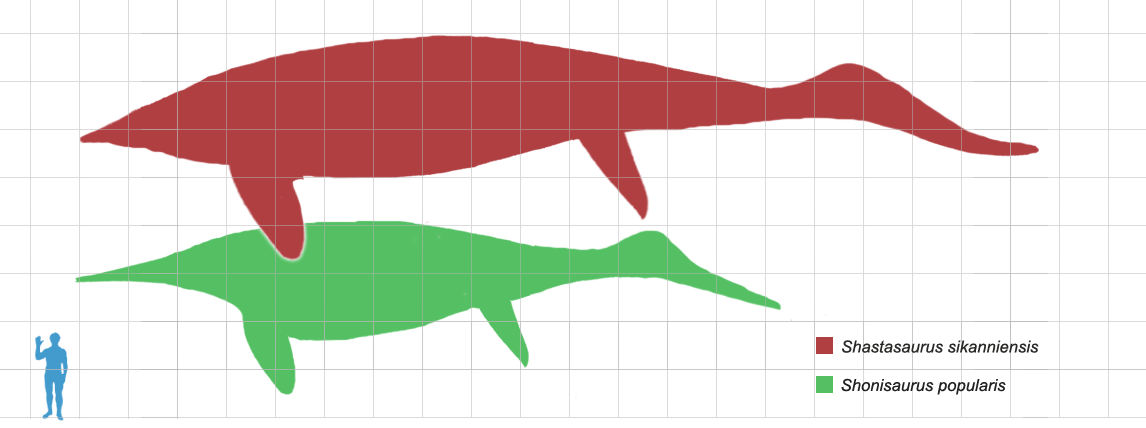
  - Diagram illustrating Shonisaurus (green) and Shastasaurus sikanniensis (red) with an anachronistic human to scale
    †Shonisaurus popularis
- †Sibyllonautilus
- †Sirenites
- †Solenopora
- †Spiriferina
  - †Spiriferina alia
  - †Spiriferina homfrayi – type locality for species
  - †Spiriferina roundyi
- †Stenopopanoceras
- †Sturia
- †Styrionautilus
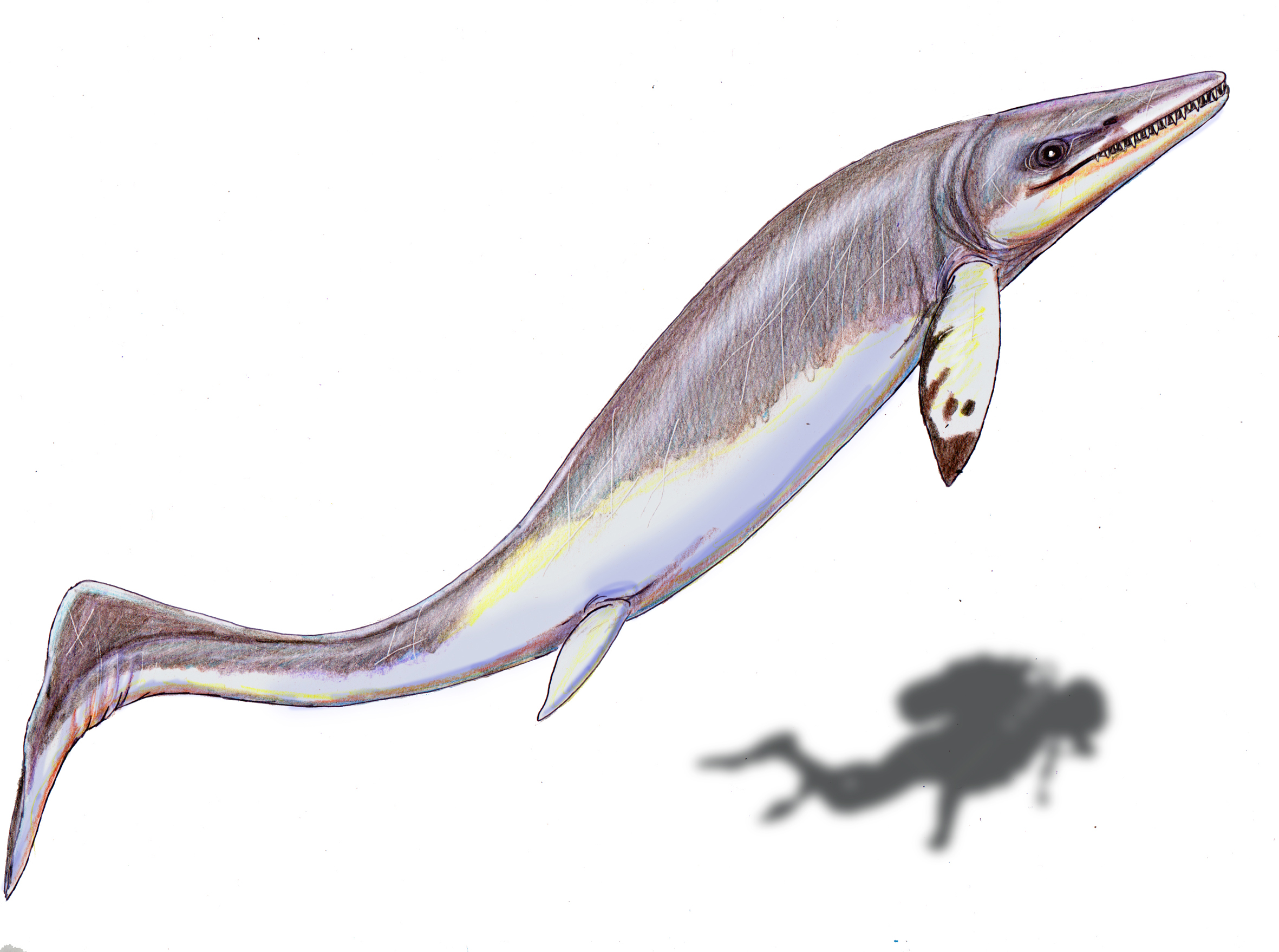
- Life restoration of the Middle Triassic ichthyosaur Thalattoarchon
  †Thalattoarchon – type locality for genus
  - †Thalattoarchon saurophagis – type locality for species
- †Thamnasteria
- †Trichites
- †Trigonia
- †Tutcheria
- †Ussurites
- †Vermiceras
- †Vex
- †Wyomingites
- †Xenoceltites
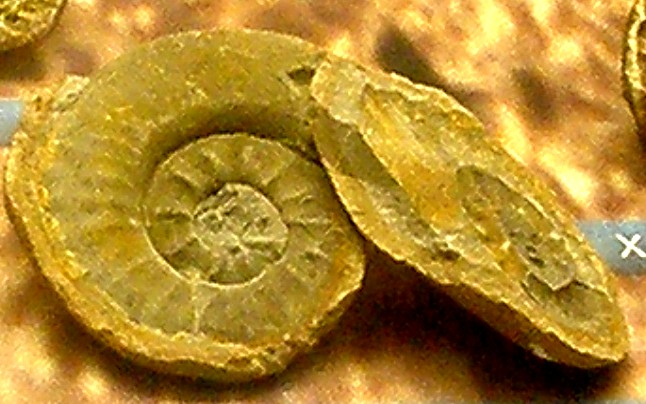
- Fossilized shells of the ammonoid cephalopod Xenodiscus
  †Xenodiscus

== Cenozoic ==
=== Selected Cenozoic taxa of Nevada ===
- Abies
- Acer
- †Aelurodon
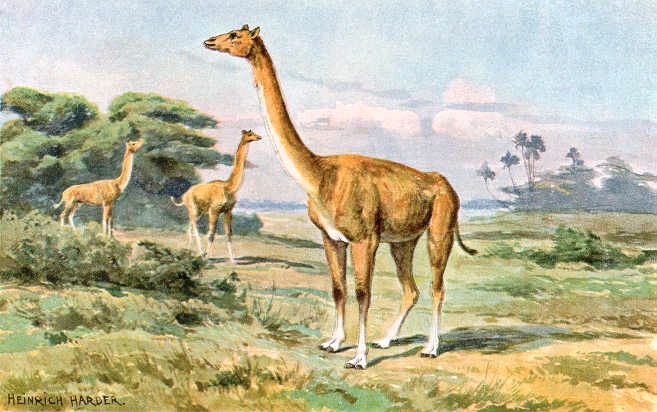
- Life restoration of the Miocene camel Aepycamelus, or the long-necked camel. Heinrich Harder (1920).
  †Aepycamelus
  - †Aepycamelus bradyi – type locality for species
  - †Aepycamelus robustus – or unidentified comparable form
  - †Aepycamelus stocki
- †Aesculus
- †Agriotherium
- †Agulla
  - †Agulla mineralensis – type locality for species
- †Aletomeryx
- †Alforjas
- Alnus
- Amelanchier
- †Amorpha
- †Anchitheriomys
- Antrozous
  - †Antrozous pallidus
- †Aphelops
- †Apis
  - †Apis nearctica – type locality for species
- Arbutus
  - †Arbutus menziesii
- †Arctodus
  - †Arctodus simus
- †Arctostaphylos
- †Astrohippus
- †Barbourofelis
  - †Barbourofelis fricki
- Bassariscus
- Betula
- †Borophagus
  - †Borophagus diversidens – or unidentified comparable form
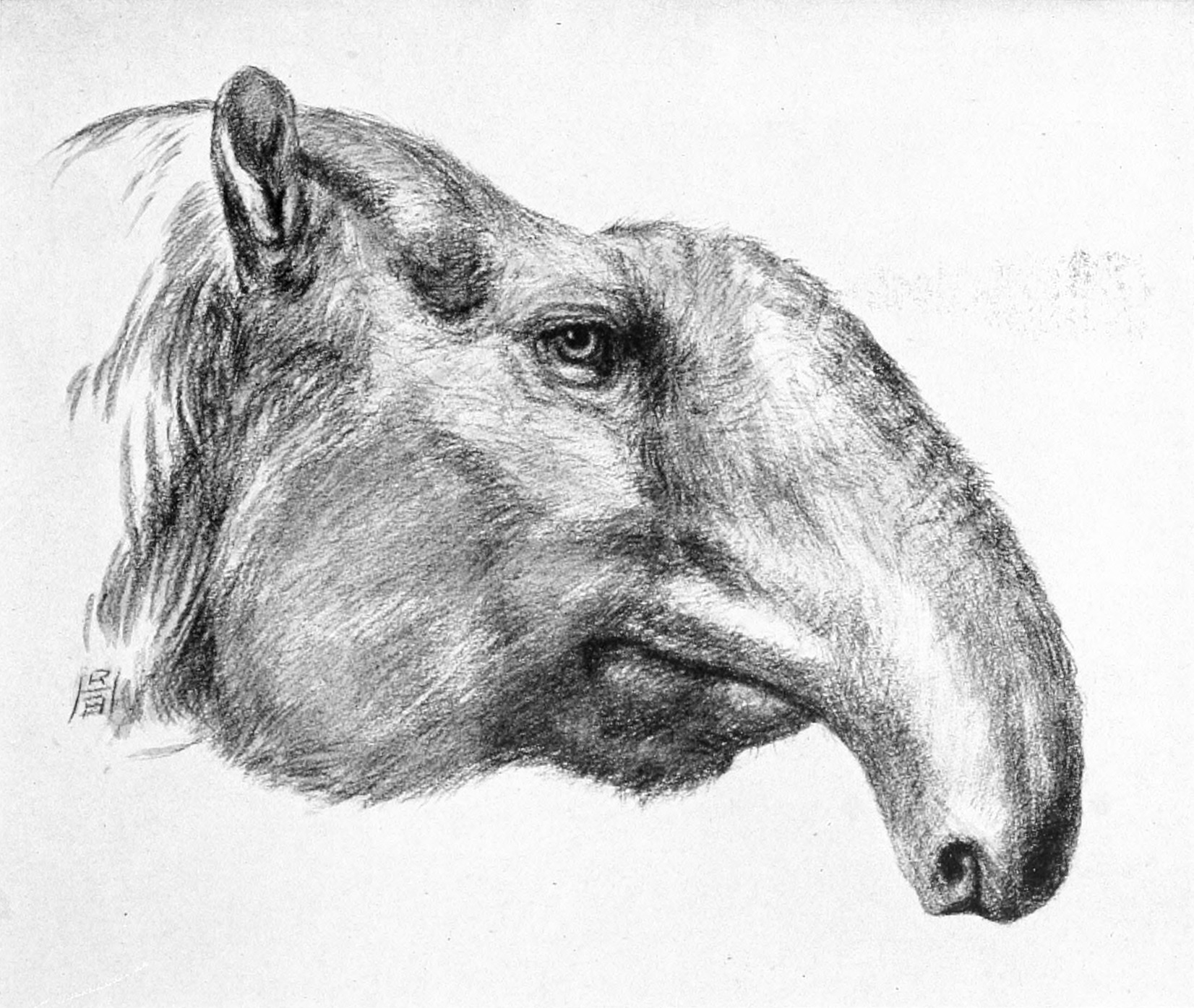
- Restorative portrait of the Miocene oreodont mammal Brachycrus
  †Brachycrus
- Brachylagus
  - †Brachylagus idahoensis
- †Brachypsalis
- †Bumelia
- †Calocedrus
- †Camelops – tentative report
- Candona
- Canis
  - †Canis latrans
  - †Canis lepophagus
- †Carpocyon
- Carya
  - †Carya ovata
- Castanopsis
- Ceanothus
- Cedrela
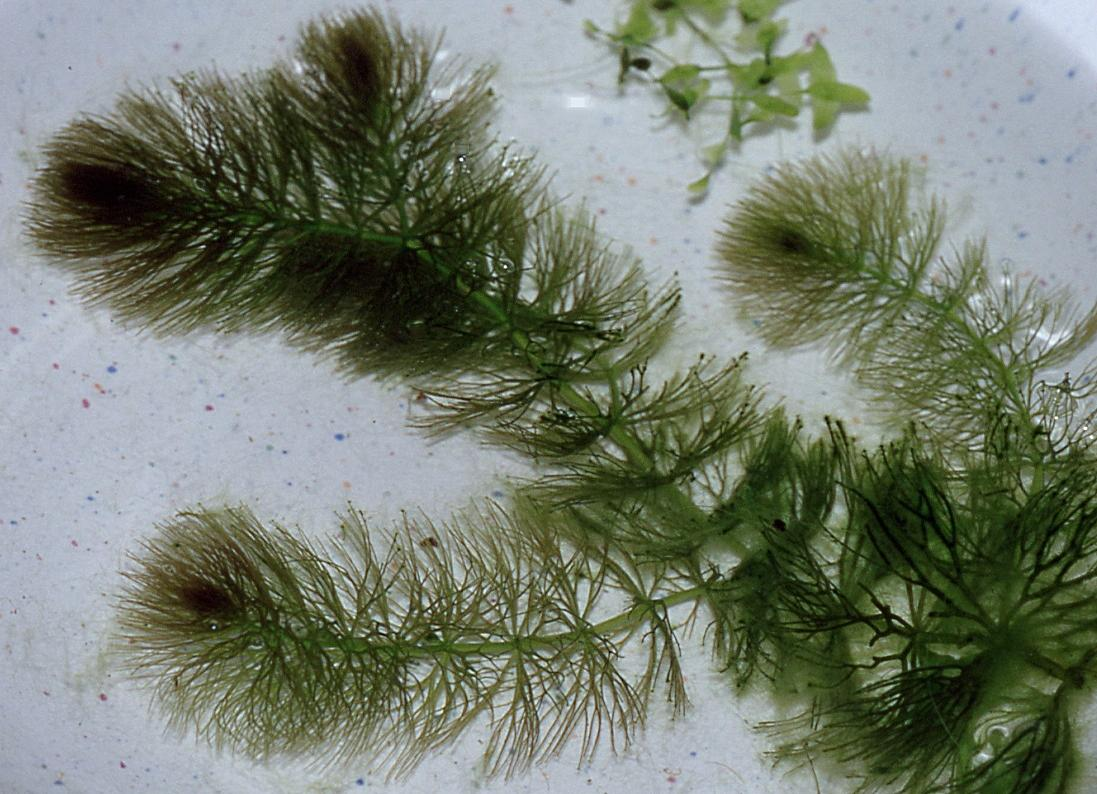
- Living Ceratophyllum, also known as coontails or hornworts
  †Ceratophyllum
- Cercis
- †Cercocarpus
- †Chamaebatia
- †Chamaecyparis
- Chara
- †Chrysolepis
- Cnemidophorus
  - †Cnemidophorus tigris
- Comptonia
- Cornus
- †Cosoryx
  - †Cosoryx furcatus
- Crataegus
- Crotalus
  - †Crotalus atrox
  - †Crotalus viridis
- Crotaphytus
  - †Crotaphytus collaris
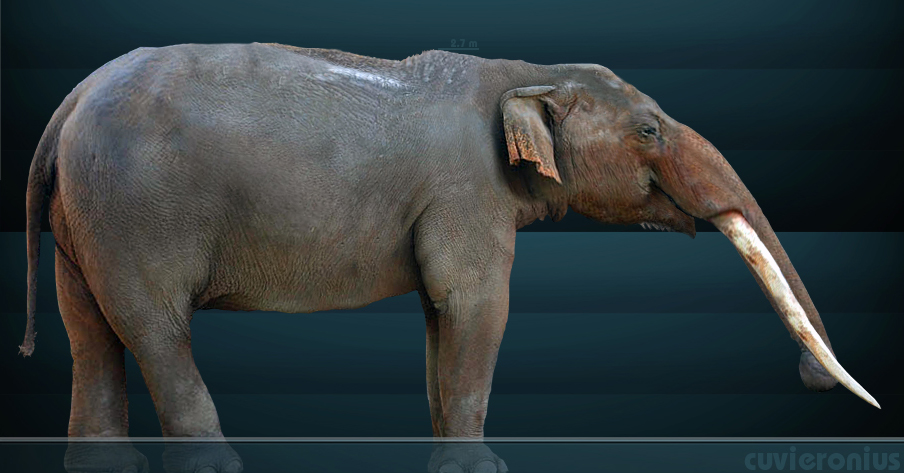
- Life restoration of the Pliocene-Holocene elephant relative Cuvieronius
  †Cuvieronius – tentative report
- †Desmatippus
- †Diceratherium – or unidentified comparable form
- †Dinohippus
- †Diospyros
- Dipodomys
- †Dipoides
- †Diprionomys
- †Dromomeryx
  - †Dromomeryx borealis
- †Epicyon
- †Equisetum
- Equus
  - †Equus giganteus
  - †Equus idahoensis
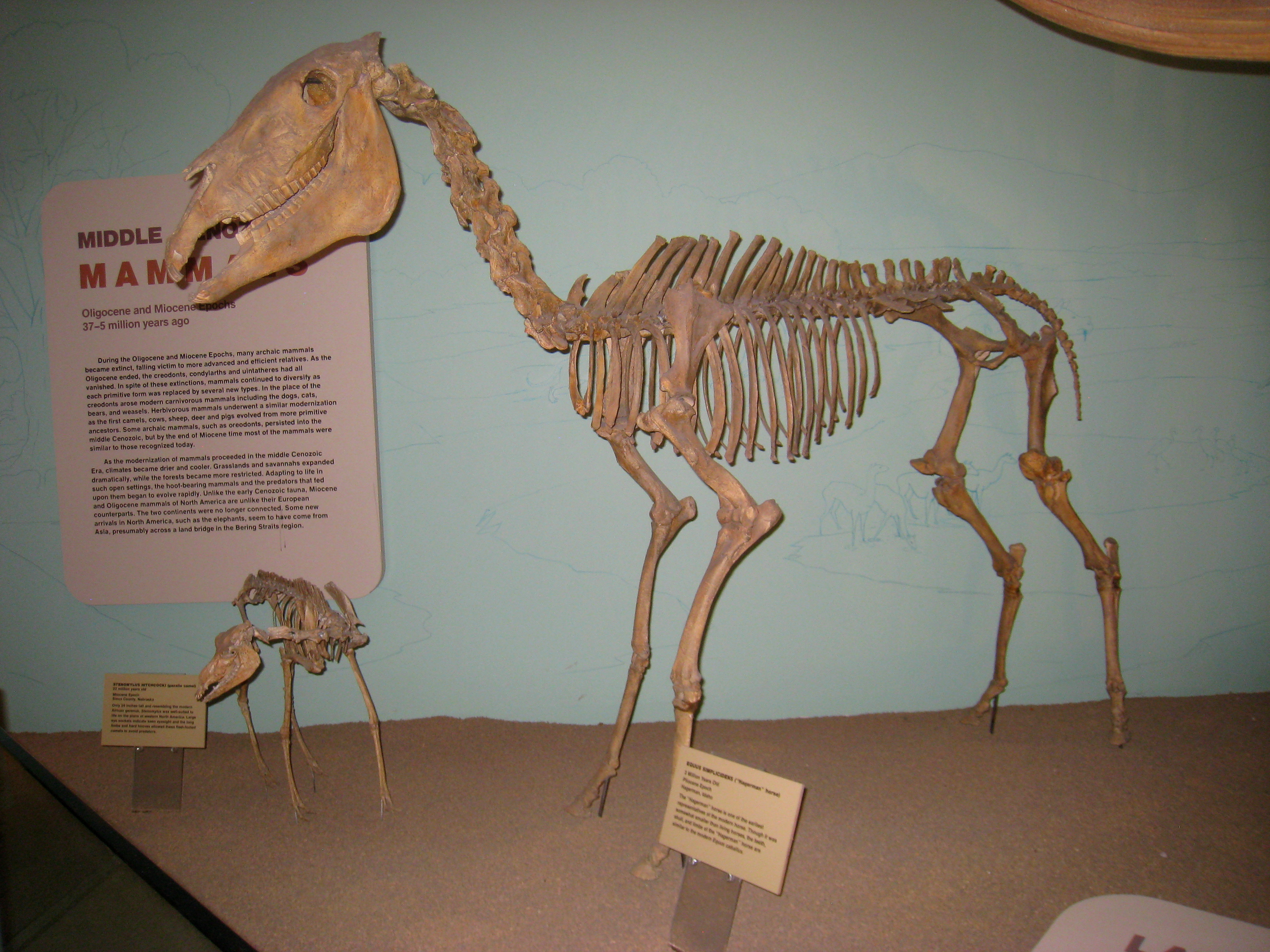
  - Fossilized skeleton of the Pliocene-Pleistocene horse Equus simplicidens, also known as the Hagerman horse or American zebra
    †Equus simplicidens
- †Eucastor
- †Euceratherium
  - †Euceratherium collinum
- †Eucyon
  - †Eucyon davisi
- Eugenia
- †Fraxinus
- Gambelia
- †Garrya
- †Gigantocamelus
- Glyptostrobus
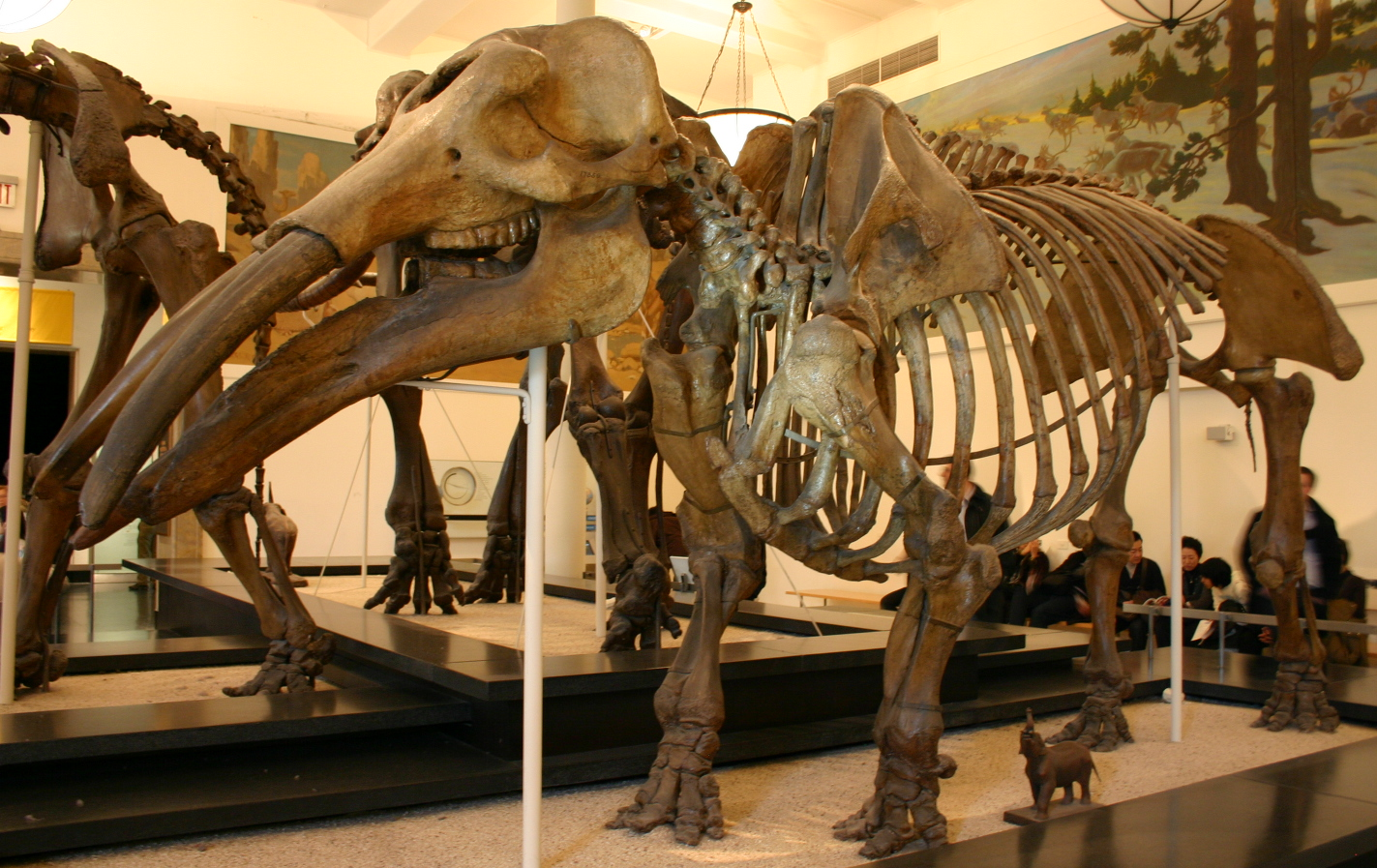
- Mounted fossilized skeleton of the Miocene-Pleistocene elephant relative Gomphotherium
  †Gomphotherium
- Gopherus
  - †Gopherus agassizii
- †Gymnocladus
- †Helaletes
- Heloderma
  - †Heloderma suspectum
- †Hemiauchenia
  - †Hemiauchenia macrocephala – or unidentified comparable form
- †Hesperocamelus
- †Heteromeles
- †Hipparion
- †Hippotherium
- †Holodiscus
- Hydrangea
- †Hyopsodus
- †Hypohippus
- †Hypolagus
- †Hyrachyus
- †Ilingoceros
  - †Ilingoceros alexandrae – type locality for species
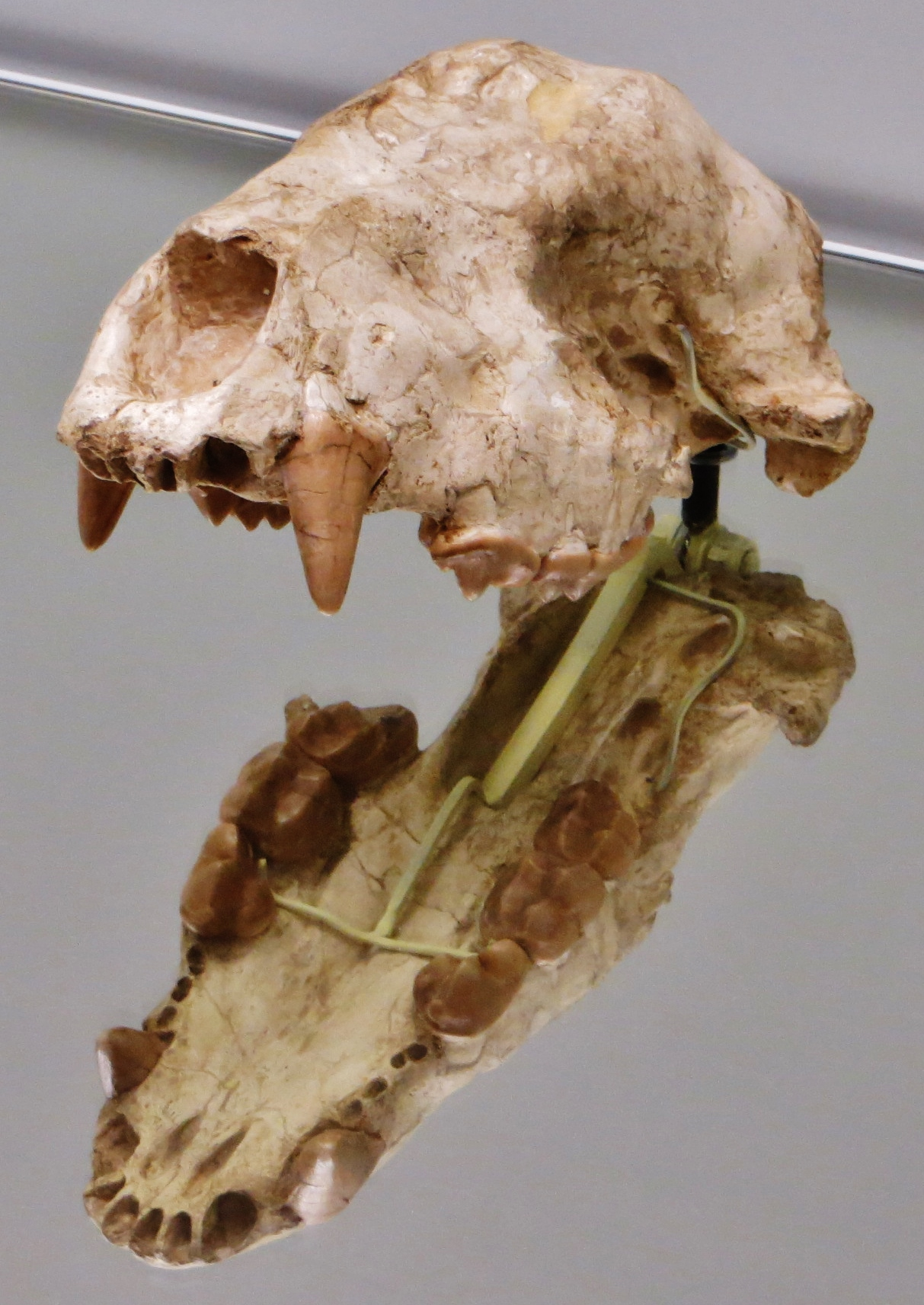
- Fossilized skull of the Miocene bear Indarctos
  †Indarctos
- †Ischyrocyon
- Juglans
- Juniperus
- Lampropeltis
  - †Lampropeltis getulus
- Larix
- Lemmiscus
  - †Lemmiscus curtatus
- †Leptocyon
- †Leucothoe
- †Lithocarpus
- Lymnaea
- †Lyonothamnus
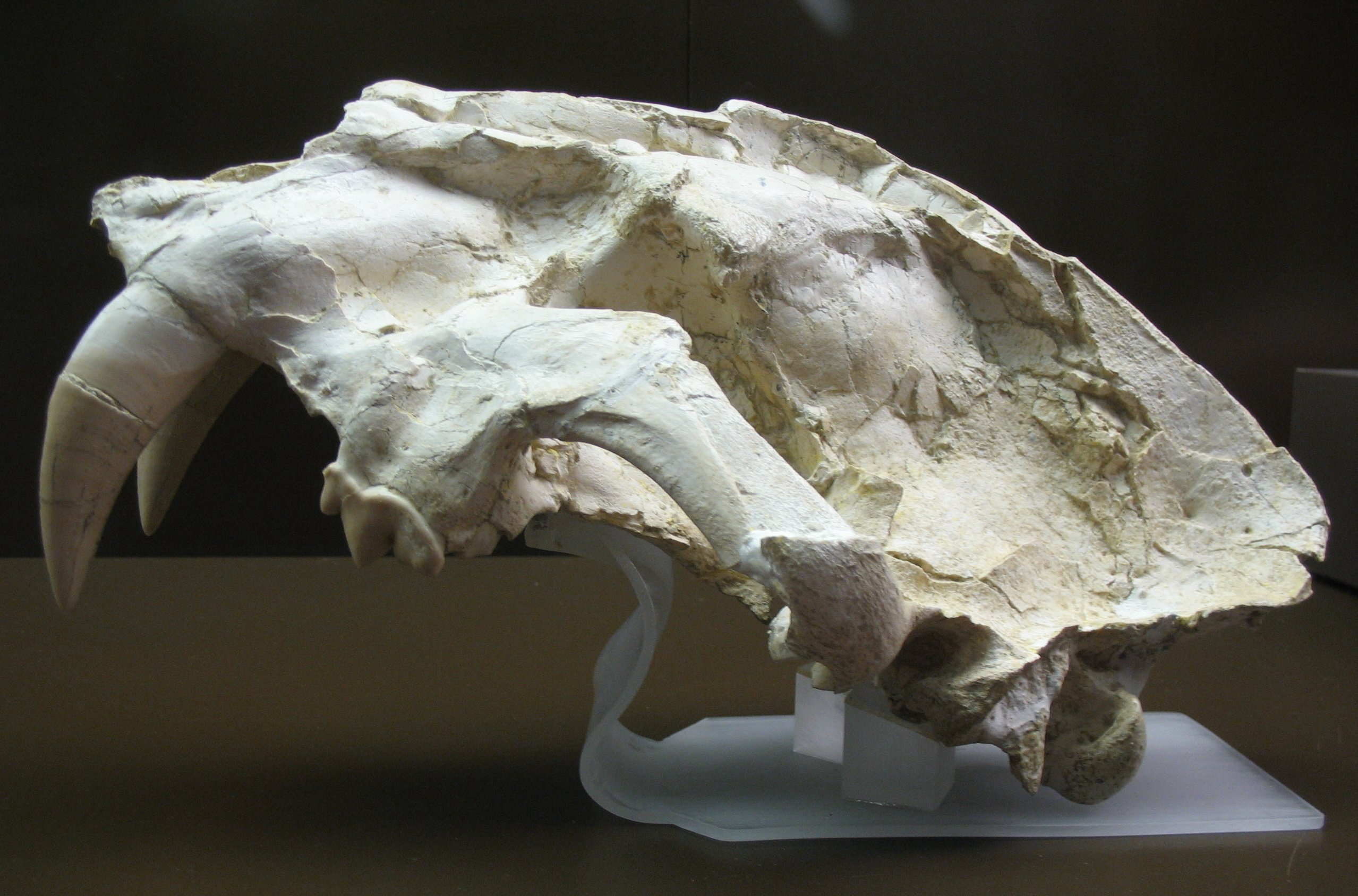
- Fossilized cranium of the Miocene-Pleistocene saber-toothed cat Machairodus
  †Machairodus
- Mahonia
- †Mammut
  - †Mammut americanum
  - †Mammut matthewi
- Marmota
- Masticophis
  - †Masticophis flagellum
- †Mastodon
- †Megahippus
- †Megalonyx
  - †Megalonyx leptostomus
- †Megatylopus
- †Merychippus
- †Merychyus
- †Merycodus
- †Metalopex
- †Metatomarctus
- †Microtomarctus
- Microtus
  - †Microtus pennsylvanicus
- †Miopelodytes – type locality for genus
- †Monosaulax
- †Moropus
- Mustela
  - †Mustela nigripes
  - †Mustela nivalis
- Myotis
- †Neohipparion
- Neotoma
- †Notharctus
  - †Notharctus tenebrosus
- Notiosorex
- Odocoileus
- Ondatra
- Oreamnos
  - †Oreamnos americanus
- Ostrya
- Ovis
  - †Ovis canadensis
- †Pachystima
- †Paracamelus
- †Paracynarctus
- †Parahippus
- †Paratomarctus
- †Paronychomys
- †Peraceras
- Perognathus
- Peromyscus
- Phenacomys
- Phrynosoma
  - †Phrynosoma platyrhinos
- Picea
- Pinus
- Pituophis
  - †Pituophis catenifer
- Platanus
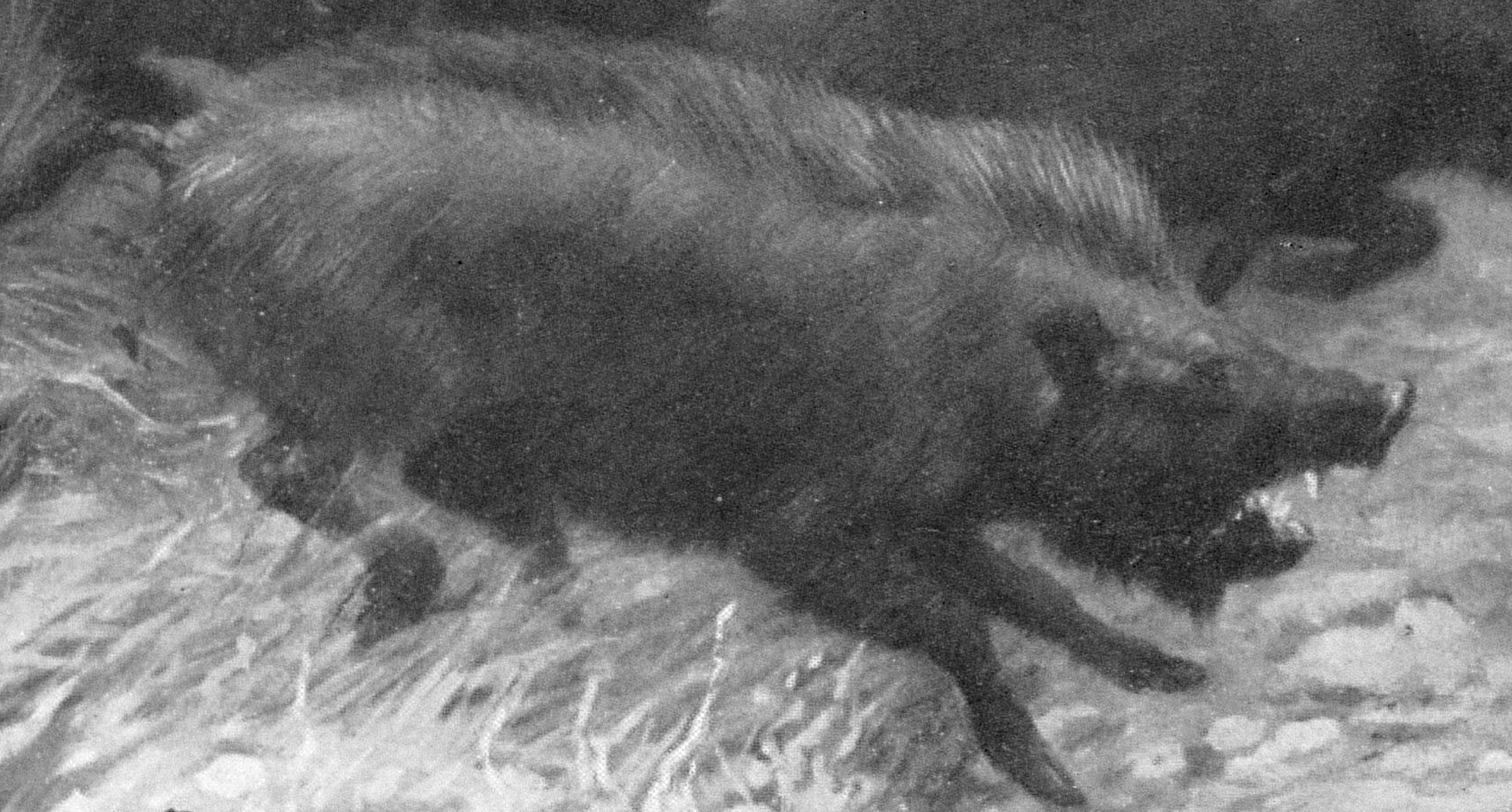
- Restoration of a herd of alarmed Miocene-Pleistocene peccaries of the genus Platygonus. Charles R. Knight (1922).
  †Platygonus
- †Pleiolama
- †Pliauchenia
- †Pliohippus
- Populus
- †Procamelus
- †Protolabis
- †Protomarctus
- Prunus
- †Pseudaelurus
- †Pseudotsuga
- Pteridium
- Pterocarya
- Quercus
- †Rana
  - †Rana pipiens
- †Repomys
- †Rhamnus
- Rhododendron
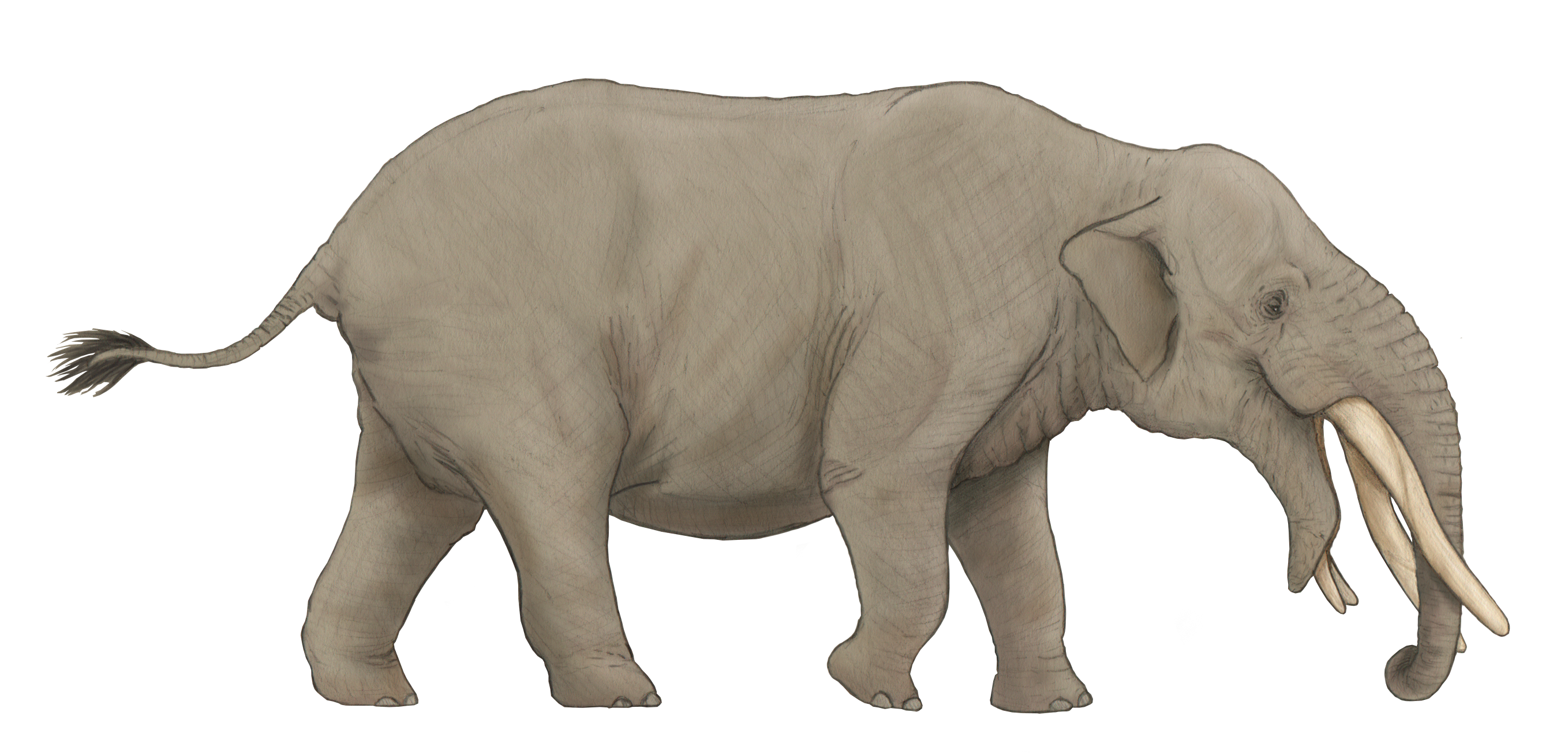
- Restoration of the Miocene-Pliocene elephant relative Rhynchotherium
  †Rhynchotherium
- †Ribes
- †Robinia
- Rosa
- Salix
- †Satherium
  - †Satherium piscinarium
- Sauromalus
  - †Sauromalus obesus
- Scapanus
- Sciurus
- †Sequoiadendron
  - †Sequoiadendron chaneyi – type locality for species
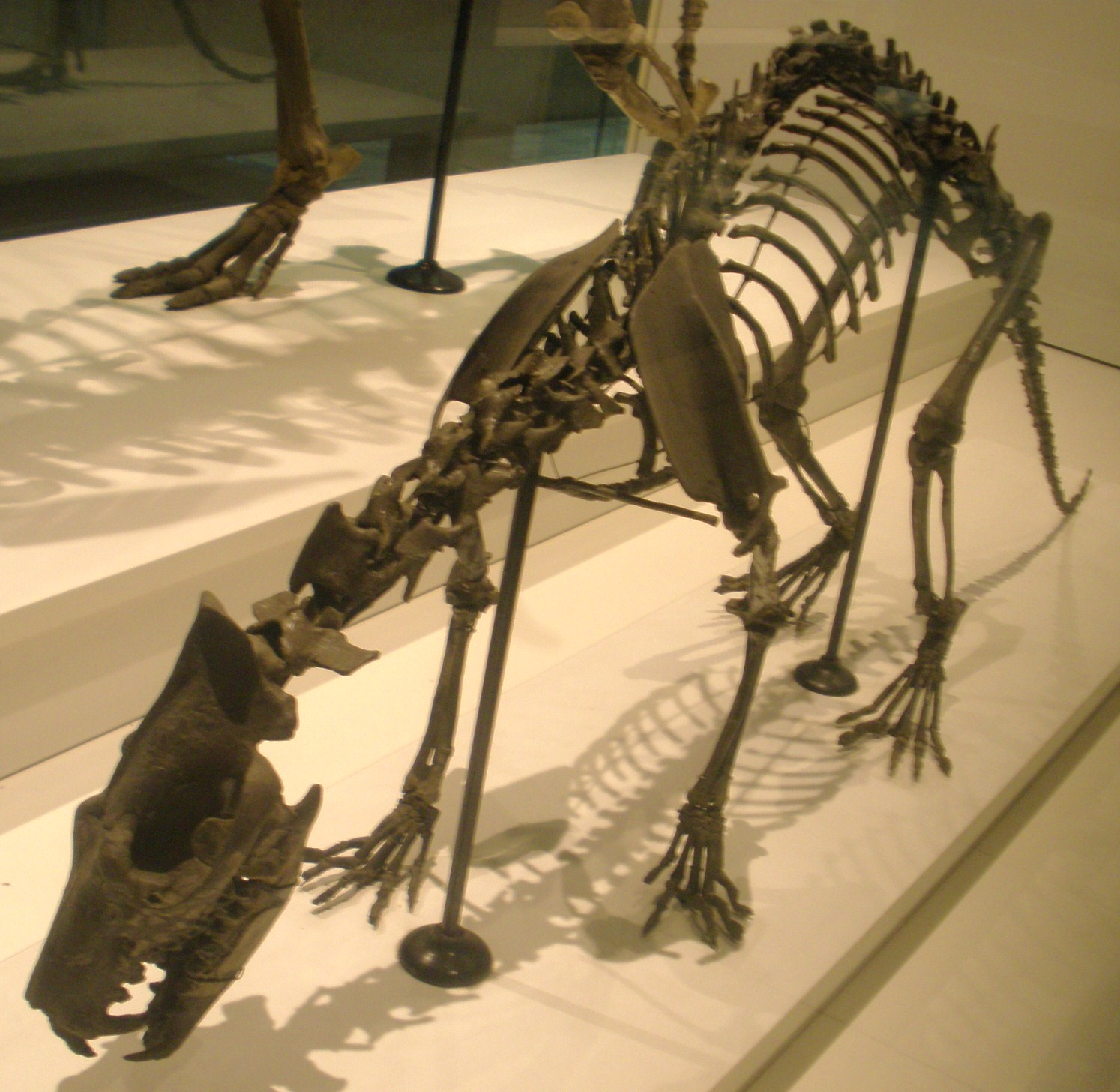
- Fossilized skeleton of the Eocene-Oligocene creodont mammal Sinopa
  †Sinopa
- †Sophora
- †Sorbus
- Sorex
- †Sparganium
- Spea
- Spermophilus
- Sphaerium
- †Steneofiber
- †Styrax
- †Subdromomeryx
  - †Subdromomeryx antilopinus – or unidentified related form
- †Symphoricarpos
- Tamias
- Taxidea
- Taxodium
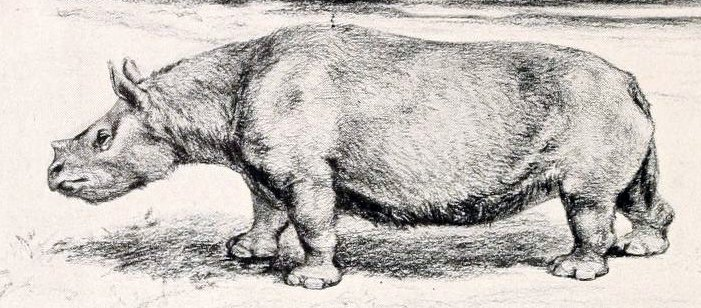
- Restoration of the Miocene-Pliocene rhinoceros Teleoceras
  †Teleoceras
  - †Teleoceras major
- Thomomys
- †Thuja
- †Ticholeptus
- Tipula
- †Tomarctus
  - †Tomarctus brevirostris
- †Torreya
- †Tsuga
- Typha
- Ulmus
- †Ursavus
- Ursus
  - †Ursus americanus
  - †Ursus arctos – or unidentified comparable form
- †Vaccinium
- †Viverravus
- Vulpes
- Zelkova
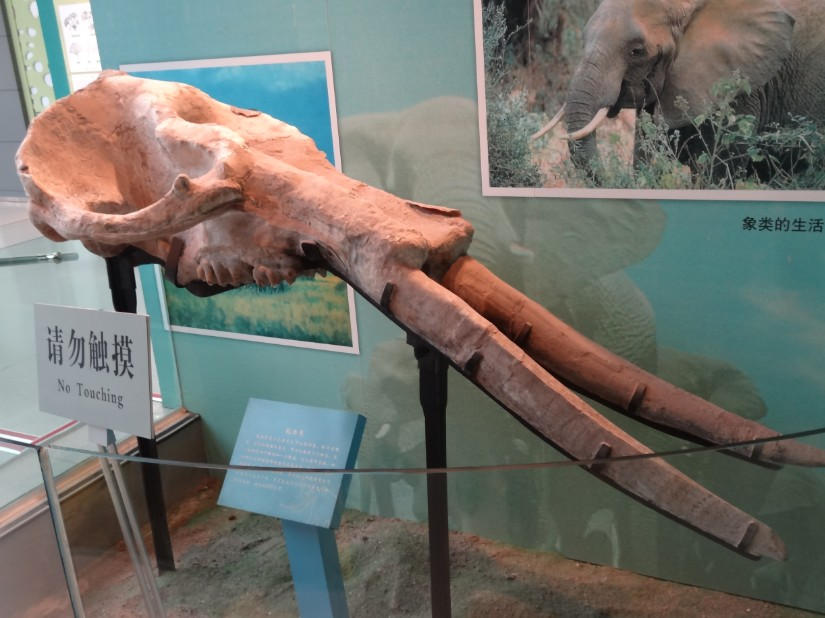
- Fossilized cranium of the Miocene-Pleistocene mastodon relative Zygolophodon
  †Zygolophodon
