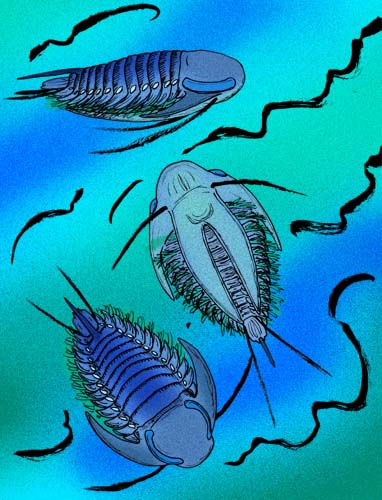
- Artist's reconstruction

Scientific classification
- Kingdom: Animalia
- Phylum: Arthropoda
- Clade: †Artiopoda
- Class: †Trilobita
- Order: †Asaphida
- Family: †Remopleurididae
- Genus: †Hypodicranotus; Whittington, 1952
- Species: †H. striatulus

Binomial name
- †Hypodicranotus striatulus (Walcott, 1875)

Synonyms
- Remopleurides striatulus Walcott, 1875

= Hypodicranotus =

Hypodicranotus Temporal range: Middle Ordovician

Hypodicranotus striatulus is an extinct, pelagic trilobite in the order Asaphida, of the family Remopleuridae. Its fossils are found in Middle Ordovician-aged marine strata in New York State, United States, and in Ontario, Canada.

The dorsal exoskeleton of H. striatulus is very similar to the related genus, Remopleurides, but, H. striatulus has a comparatively enormous, forked hypostome.
