= Komaspidella =

Komaspidella Temporal range: Dresbachian

Scientific classification
- Kingdom: Animalia
- Phylum: Arthropoda
- Clade: †Artiopoda
- Class: †Trilobita
- Order: †Corynexochida
- Genus: †Komaspidella; Kobayashi, 1938

Komaspidella is an extinct genus from a well-known class of fossil marine arthropods, the trilobites. It lived from 501 to 490 million years ago during the Dresbachian faunal stage of the late Cambrian Period.

Members of the genus are thought to have been fast moving low level carnivores and lived primarily in the ocean and on the shores of modern-day Canada and the northern United States.

The closest relatives of the members of Komaspidella are the members of the genus Ataktaspis. Komaspidella are thought to have has a smooth exoskeleton.
