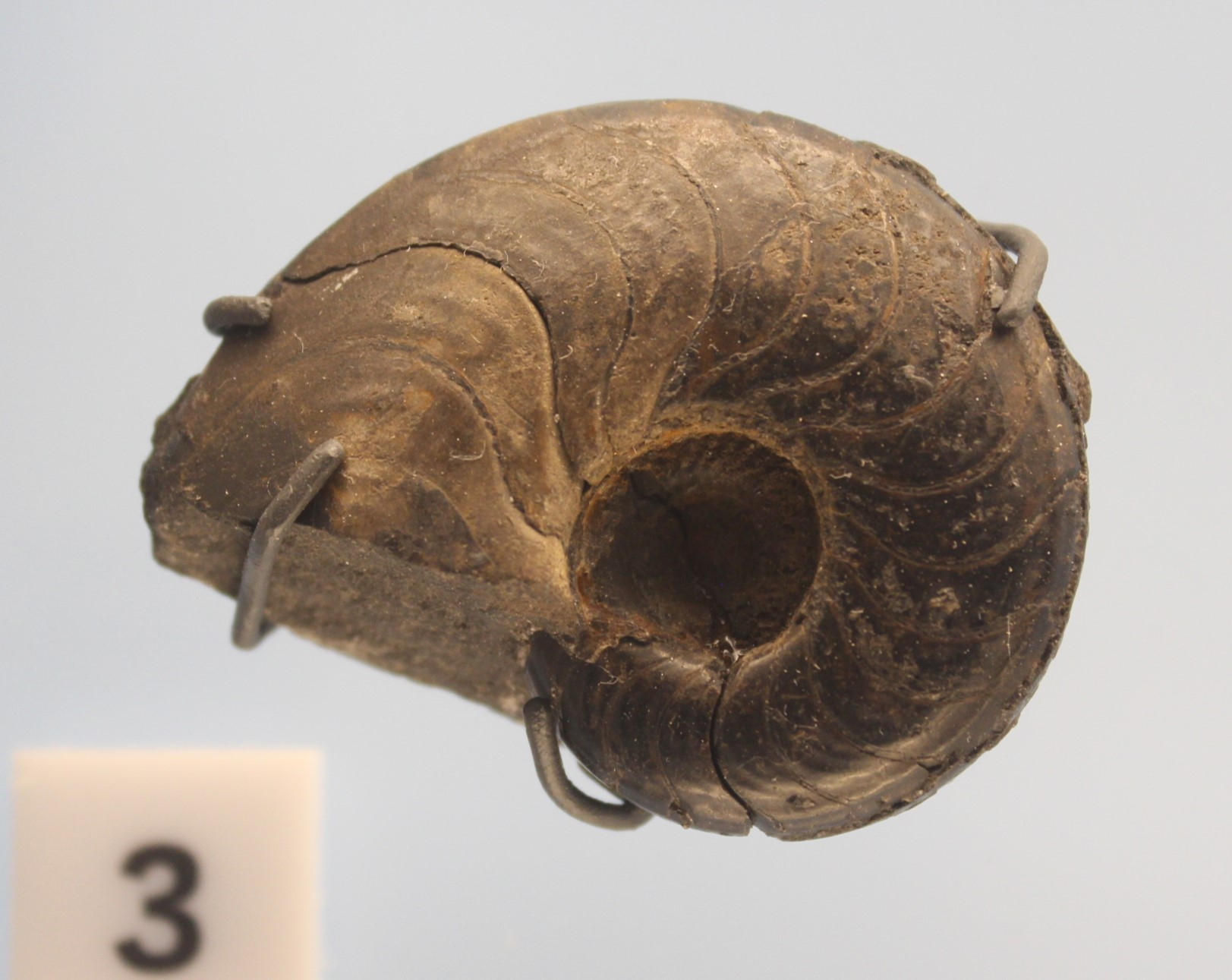
- Agoniatites expansus fossil, National Museum of Natural History

Scientific classification
- Kingdom: Animalia
- Phylum: Mollusca
- Class: Cephalopoda
- Subclass: †Ammonoidea
- Order: †Agoniatitida
- Family: †Agoniatitidae
- Genus: †Agoniatites; Meek, 1877

= Agoniatites =

Agoniatites Temporal range: Middle Devonian

Extinct genus of molluscs

Agoniatites is a genus of primitive ammonoids belonging to the order Agoniatitida and family Agoniatitidae.

Species of this genus were fast-moving nektonic carnivore shelled ammonoids. They lived in the Eifelian and Givetian ages of the middle Devonian period, which occurred 385.3-397.5 million years ago.

Vanuxemi agoniatites is a rare species in this group which is the only ammonoid found in the Hamilton Group (Mahantango Formation) in Pennsylvania and New York.

== Fossil distribution ==
Devonian of Algeria, Canada (Northwest Territories), the Czech Republic, Morocco, Russia, United States (Alaska, Nevada, New York, Pennsylvania)

== Species ==
- Agoniatites annulatus
- Agoniatites bicanaliculatus
- Agoniatites costulatus
- Agoniatites kayseri Wedekind
- Agoniatites nodiferus Hall
- Agoniatites obliquus Whidborne
- Agoniatites occultus
- Agoniatites vanuxemi

== Gallery ==
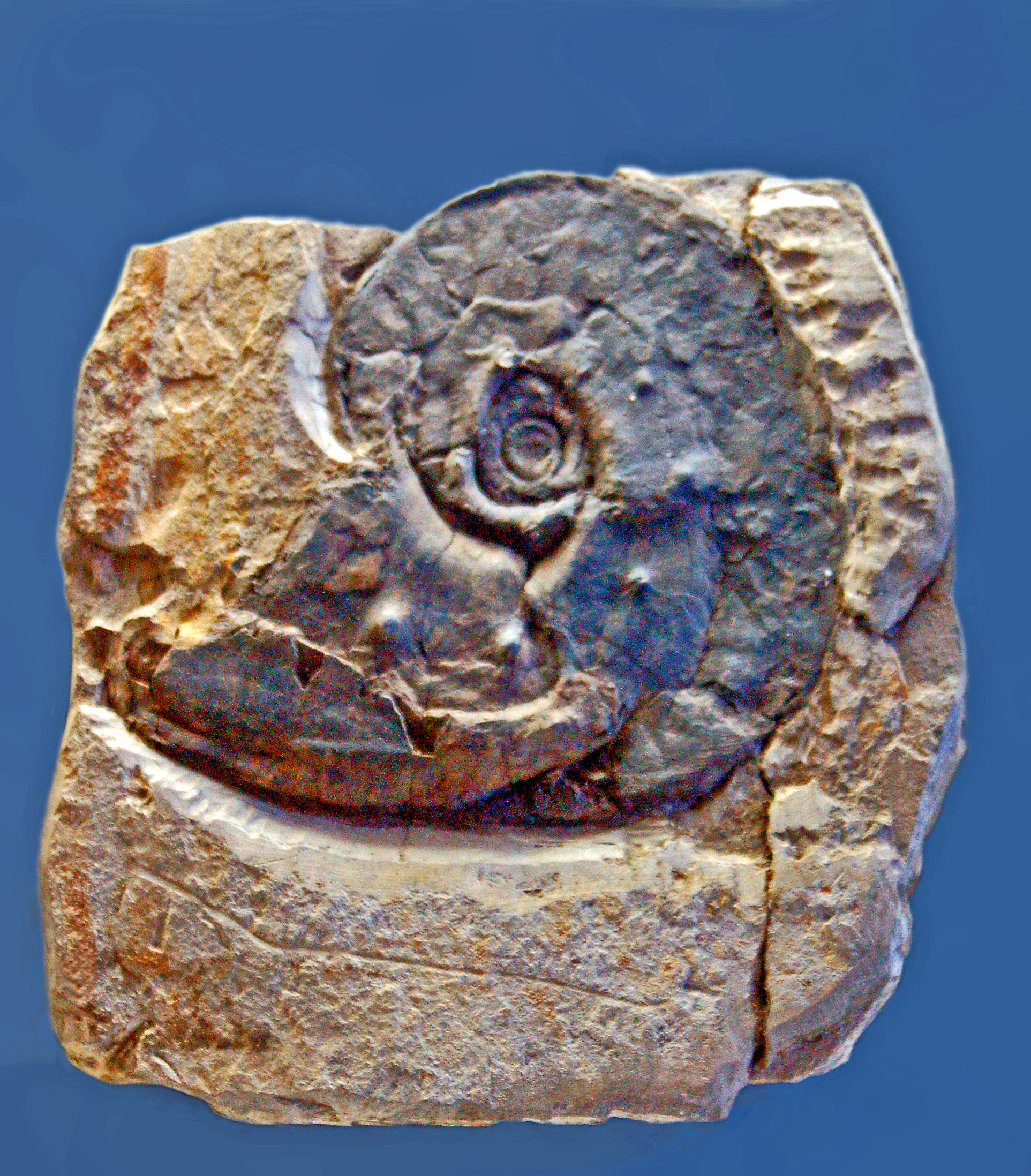
Agoniatites nodiferus

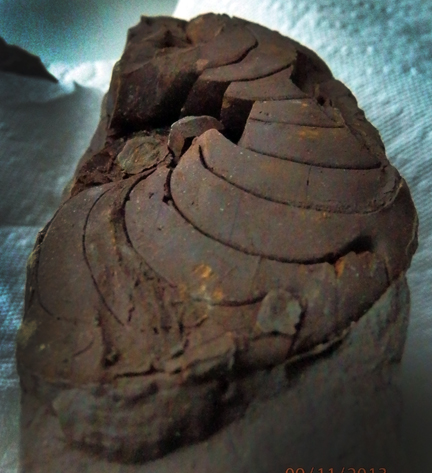
Agoniatites vanuxemi (Fossil discovered by Michael Tomczyk at a 385 million year old Devonian formation near Deer Lake, Pennsylvania in 2013)
