= Spiriferina =

Spiriferina Temporal range: Early Jurassic ~201–174 Ma

Scientific classification
- Kingdom: Animalia
- Phylum: Brachiopoda
- Class: Rhynchonellata
- Order: †Spiriferinida
- Family: †Spiriferinidae
- Subfamily: †Spiriferininae
- Genus: †Spiriferina; D'Orbigny, 1847

Extinct genus of brachiopods

Spiriferina is an extinct genus of brachiopods that lived in the Early Jurassic. Its representatives have been reported from Europe, North Africa, Saudi Arabia, and Alaska.

The genus used to be treated more widely, so earlier reports were from the Late Silurian to the Middle Jurassic in Asia, Europe, North America, South America, and New Zealand.

== Species ==
The following species have been described within the genus:

- Spiriferina abichi
- Spiriferina alia
- Spiriferina betacalcis
- Spiriferina borealis
- Spiriferina cassiana
- Spiriferina coreyi
- Spiriferina elegantissima
- Spiriferina fortis
- Spiriferina homfrayi
- Spiriferina kiparisovae
- Spiriferina munsterii
- Spiriferina nicklesi
- Spiriferina panderi
- Spiriferina papillosa
- Spiriferina rostrata
- Spiriferina roundyi
- Spiriferina rupicola
- Spiriferina salomonensis
- Spiriferina slovenica
- Spiriferina subfragilis
- Spiriferina terebratuloides
- Spiriferina terzadica
- Spiriferina tornata
- Spiriferina toulai
- Spiriferina triplicata
- Spiriferina walcotti
- Spiriferina yukonensis

However, some of the above-listed species have been transferred to other genera since the original description, for example S. alpina and S. rostrata to the genus Liospiriferina.
