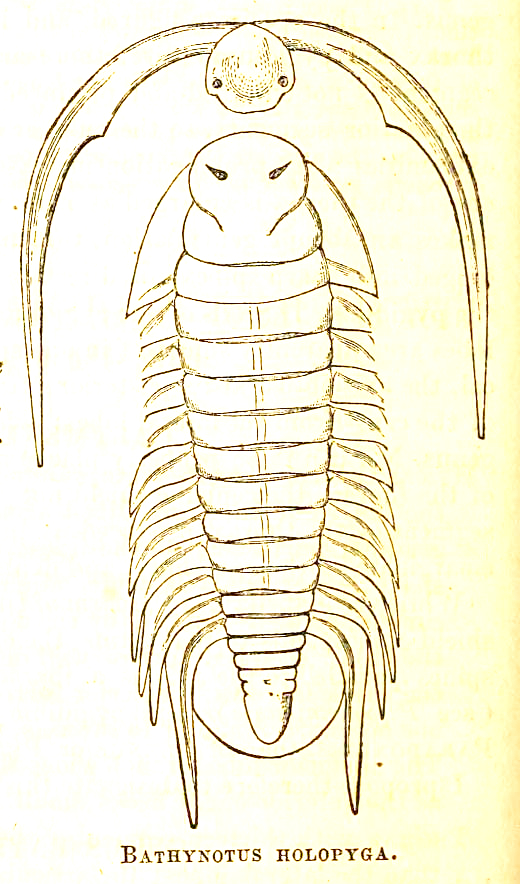

Scientific classification
- Kingdom: Animalia
- Phylum: Arthropoda
- Clade: †Artiopoda
- Class: †Trilobita
- Order: †Redlichiida
- Family: †Chengkouaspidae
- Genus: †Bathynotus; Hall, 1860.

Species
- Bathynotus holopygus (Hall, 1859) (Type); Bathynotus elongatus Zhao, Gong & Wang, 1987; Bathynotus kueichouensis Lu in Wang et al, 1964

= Bathynotus =

Bathynotus Temporal range: 517 Ma late Botomian

Extinct genus of trilobites

Bathynotus is a genus of trilobites of the family Chengkouaspidae. Its fossils have been found in the paleocontinents Laurentia (specifically in what are now Nevada and Vermont), Gondwana (in South China and South-Australia), and - doubtfully - Siberia. It is characterized by a very wide axis in the thorax and an enlarged 11th segment that bears a long, backwardly directed spine on each side. Additionally, the 12th and 13th segments are narrow and fuse with the edge of the spine of the 11th segment.

== Etymology ==
Bathynotus is derived from the Greek words βαθυς -bathus- meaning "ample"; and νοτος -notos- meaning "back", for the very wide axis of the thorax. The species names are derived as follows.

- elongatus means lengthened, for the greater body length of this species.
- holopygus means entire shield, for the pygidium that has a smooth border.
- kueichoensis comes from Kweichow (now Guizhou Province) in China where this species was collected.
