= Gambelia =

Gambelia may refer to:

- Gambelia (lizard), a genus of reptiles in the family Crotaphytidae
- Gambelia (plant), a genus of plants in the family Plantaginaceae
