= Remopleurides =

Scientific classification
- Kingdom: Animalia
- Phylum: Arthropoda
- Clade: †Artiopoda
- Class: †Trilobita
- Order: †Asaphida
- Family: †Remopleurididae
- Genus: †Remopleurides; Portlock, 1843

Extinct genus of trilobites

Remopleurides is an extinct genus of trilobites.
