= 2018 in paleomalacology =

This list, 2018 in paleomalacology, is a list of new taxa of ammonites and other fossil cephalopods, as well as fossil gastropods, bivalves and other molluscs that were described during the year 2018, as well as other significant discoveries and events related to molluscan paleontology that occurred in the year 2018.

== General research ==
- A study on the impact of the Paleocene–Eocene Thermal Maximum on the richness, turnover, or ecological structure of shallow marine molluscan faunas from the Gulf Coastal Plain, or on the body size, growth rate, or life span of component taxa, is published by Ivany et al. (2018).
- A study on the basal metabolic rate of Pliocene to recent bivalves and gastropods from the Western Atlantic is published by Strotz et al. (2018).
- A study evaluating how faithfully stratigraphic ranges of extant Adriatic molluscs are recorded in a series of cores drilled through alluvial, coastal and shallow-marine strata of the Po Plain (Italy) is published by Nawrot et al. (2018), who also evaluate the implications of their study for interpretations of the timing, duration and ecological selectivity of mass extinction events in general.

== Ammonites ==
=== Research ===
- A study on the life history and habits of ammonites as indicated by measurements of their conchs is published by Walton & Korn (2018).
- A study on the life mode of ammonite hatchlings, as indicated by the oxygen and carbon isotope composition of the embryonic shells and early postembryonic whorls of five juveniles of Hoploscaphites comprimus from the Fox Hills Formation (South Dakota, United States), is published by Linzmeier et al. (2018).
- A study on the succession of latest Permian ammonite fossils in Iran is published by Kiessling et al. (2018), who interpret their findings as indicating that Permian–Triassic extinction event had a prelude leading to extinction pulses, a decline of body size and morphological simplification in latest Permian ammonites.
- A study on the distribution and abundance of Early Triassic ammonites from the western United States basin is published by Jattiot et al. (2018).
- A study testing whether the Rapoport effect can be observed among the early Pliensbachian ammonites from the area of the present-day Europe, the Middle East and North Africa is published by Zacaï et al. (2018).
- A study on the number of eggs laid by large adult females of Cretaceous ammonites and belemnites, as well as on the ecological niches occupied by juvenile ammonites and belemnites, is published by Tajika, Nützel & Klug (2018).
- Ammonite nuclei (earliest whorls), representing a rare case of preservation of very early ontogenetic stages of ammonites and indicating high juvenile mortality that is seldom recorded in the fossil record of this group, are described from the Cretaceous (upper Turonian to Coniacian) of Tanzania by Ifrim, Wendler & Lehmann (2018), who interpret their finding as indicating that the mating and spawning areas of ammonites were locally restricted, and that their earliest ontogenetic stages were probably distributed by currents passing by their mating and spawning areas, similar to extant coleoids.
- A study on the paleoecology of the ammonites belonging to the genera Baculites and Scaphites, as indicated by the intracolonial variance in the size of zooids of cheilostome bryozoans that colonized the internal body chambers of the shells of these ammonites once they settled to the seafloor following the death of the ammonite, is published by Berry (2018).
- A study on the growth of spines in Kimmeridgian aspidoceratids, Turonian euomphaloceratines and Coniacian collignoniceratids is published by Ifrim, Bengtson & Schweigert (2018).
- A study on the suture lines in Cretaceous ammonite genera and on the link between suture complexity and generic longevity in ammonites is published by Pérez-Claros & Bengtson (2018).
- A study on the ammonite turnover events during the broad 'mid-Cretaceous' interval is published by Bengtson & Kakabadze (2018).
- A sclerochronological study of shell material from seep and age-equivalent non-seep specimens of Baculites compressus, aiming to test the hypothesis that methane seeps provided a habitat for ammonites, is published by Landman et al. (2018).

=== New taxa ===
Name	Novelty	Status	Authors	Age	Unit	Location	Notes	Images
Ambites bjerageri	Sp. nov	Valid	Ware & Bucher in Ware et al.	Early Triassic	Ceratite Marls	Pakistan	A member of Ceratitida belonging to the group Meekocerataceae and the family Gyronitidae.	
Ambites bojeseni	Sp. nov	Valid	Ware & Bucher in Ware et al.	Early Triassic	Ceratite Marls	India; Pakistan	A member of Ceratitida belonging to the group Meekocerataceae and the family Gyronitidae.	
Ambites nyingmai	Sp. nov	Valid	Ware & Bucher in Ware et al.	Early Triassic		India	A member of Ceratitida belonging to the group Meekocerataceae and the family Gyronitidae.	
Ambites subradiatus	Sp. nov	Valid	Ware & Bucher in Ware et al.	Early Triassic	Ceratite Marls	India; Pakistan	A member of Ceratitida belonging to the group Meekocerataceae and the family Gyronitidae.	
Ambites tenuis	Sp. nov	Valid	Ware & Bucher in Ware et al.	Early Triassic	Lower Ceratite Limestone	India; Pakistan	A member of Ceratitida belonging to the group Meekocerataceae and the family Gyronitidae.	
Arctoceras rubyae	Sp. nov	Valid	Jenks & Brayard	Early Triassic		United States (Nevada)		
Aspenites weitschati	Sp. nov	Valid	Jenks & Brayard	Early Triassic		United States (Nevada)		
Aspidoceras (Pseudowaagenia) inerme	Sp. nov	Valid	Énay	Late Jurassic (Kimmeridgian)		France		
Awanites	Gen. et sp. nov	Valid	Ware & Bucher in Ware et al.	Early Triassic	Ceratite Marls	Pakistan	A member of Ceratitida belonging to the group Meekocerataceae and the family Paranoritidae. Genus includes new species A. awani.	
Borroceras	Gen. et sp. et comb. nov	Valid	Vermeulen et al.	Early Cretaceous		France	A relative of Emericiceras. The type species is B. borroi; genus also includes B. ottohaasi (Sarkar, 1955) and B. mahadevai (Sarkar, 1955).	
Bukkenites sakesarensis	Sp. nov	Valid	Ware & Bucher in Ware et al.	Early Triassic	Lower Ceratite Limestone	India; Pakistan	A member of Ceratitida belonging to the group Meekocerataceae and the family Proptychitidae.	
Bullatihungarites	Gen. et comb. nov	Valid	Vörös	Middle Triassic (Anisian)	Vászoly Formation	Bosnia and Herzegovina; Hungary; Italy	A member of the family Hungaritidae. The type species is "Hungarites" emiliae Mojsisovics (1882); genus also includes "Ceratites (Hungarites)" semiplicatus Hauer (1896).	
Clausiuraloceras mechetlense	Sp. nov	Valid	Kutygin	Permian (Kungurian)		Russia		
Comahueites	Gen. et sp. nov	Valid	Aguirre-Urreta & Rawson	Early Cretaceous (Early Hauterivian)	Agrio Formation	Argentina	A member of the family Neocomitidae. Genus includes new species C. aequalicostatus.	
Condensoceras	Gen. et comb. nov	Valid	Jenks & Brayard	Early Triassic		United States (Nevada)	A member of the family Xenoceltitidae; a new genus for "Xenoceltites" youngi Kummel & Steele (1962).	
Conteites	Gen. et comb. nov	Valid	Delanoy et al.	Early Cretaceous (Barremian)		France	A member of Ancyloceratina belonging to the family Heteroceratidae. The type species is "Heteroceras" fuhrae Delanoy (1997).	
Costaclymenia subsolaris	Sp. nov	Valid	Korn, Bockwinkel & Ebbighausen	Devonian (Famennian)		Morocco		
Crittendenites	Gen. et sp. nov	Valid	Jenks & Brayard	Early Triassic		United States (Nevada)	A relative of Wyomingites Hyatt (1900); both genera are assigned to the new family Crittendentidae. Genus includes new species C. jattioti.	
Delphinites heineae	Sp. nov	Valid	Mitta	Early Cretaceous (Valanginian)		Russia	A member of the family Neocomitidae.	
Diptychoceras iwatense	Sp. nov	Valid	Obata & Matsukawa	Early Cretaceous	Miyako Group	Japan		
Djanaliparkinsonia alanica	Sp. nov	Valid	Mitta	Middle Jurassic (Bajocian)	Djangura Formation	Russia (Karachay-Cherkessia)	A member of the family Stephanoceratidae.	
Dorsoplanites typicus	Nom. nov	Valid	Mitta & Starodubtseva	Late Jurassic		Russia	A replacement name for Dorsoplanites panderi auct. non Eichwald (1840).	
Elkoceras	Gen. et comb. nov	Valid	Jenks & Brayard	Early Triassic		United States (Nevada)	An ammonite of uncertain phylogenetic placement; a new genus for "Dieneroceras" spathi Kummel & Steele (1962).	
Eofrechites	Gen. et sp. nov	Valid	Ji & Bucher	Middle Triassic (Anisian)		Canada (British Columbia)	Genus includes new species E. roopnarini.	
Eoscaphites kuersteineri	Sp. nov	Valid	Tajika, Tschanz & Klug	Early Cretaceous (Albian)		Switzerland		
Epikellnerites	Gen. et comb. et 4 sp. nov	Valid	Vörös	Middle Triassic (Anisian)		Bosnia and Herzegovina; Hungary; Italy	A member of the family Ceratitidae. The type species is "Ceratites" angustecarinatus Hauer (1896); genus also includes "Kellnerites" bagolinensis Brack & Rieber (1993), as well as new species E. tamasi, E. vaszolyensis, E. pseudocholnokyi and E. spinatus.	
Gambleites	Gen. et sp. nov	Valid	Jenks & Brayard	Early Triassic		United States (Nevada)	A member of the family Proptychitidae. Genus includes new species G. eichhorni.	
Geticeras	Gen. et sp. nov	Valid	Pandey, Pathak & Jaitly	Early Cretaceous (Valanginian)	Giumal Formation	India	A member of the family Neocomitidae. The type species is G. getensis.	
Ghazalaites	Gen. et sp. nov	Valid	Ware & Bucher in Ware et al.	Early Triassic	Lower Ceratite Limestone	India; Pakistan	A member of the family Ophiceratidae. The type species is G. roohii.	
Glaucolithites gardarikensis	Sp. nov	Valid	Kiselev in Kiselev & Rogov	Late Jurassic		Russia (Ulyanovsk Oblast)	A member of the family Dorsoplanitidae.	
Gyronites bullatus	Sp. nov	Valid	Ware & Bucher in Ware et al.	Early Triassic		India	A member of Ceratitida belonging to the group Meekocerataceae and the family Gyronitidae.	
Gyronites levilatus	Sp. nov	Valid	Ware & Bucher in Ware et al.	Early Triassic		India	A member of Ceratitida belonging to the group Meekocerataceae and the family Gyronitidae.	
Gyronites schwanderi	Sp. nov	Valid	Ware & Bucher in Ware et al.	Early Triassic	Lower Ceratite Limestone	India; Pakistan	A member of Ceratitida belonging to the group Meekocerataceae and the family Gyronitidae.	
Heteroceras gracile	Sp. nov	Valid	Baudouin et al.	Early Cretaceous (late Barremian)		Bulgaria; France; Japan?		
Hungarites sinuosus	Sp. nov	Valid	Vörös	Middle Triassic (Anisian)	Vászoly Formation	Hungary	A member of the family Hungaritidae.	
Hungarites szentei	Sp. nov	Valid	Vörös	Middle Triassic (Anisian)	Vászoly Formation	Hungary	A member of the family Hungaritidae.	
Hybonoticeras authariformis	Sp. nov	Valid	Olóriz & Villaseñor	Late Jurassic (Tithonian)		Mexico		
Hypacanthoplites regina	Sp. nov	Valid	Obata & Matsukawa	Early Cretaceous	Miyako Group	Japan		
Hyparpadites szaboi	Sp. nov	Valid	Vörös	Middle Triassic (Anisian)	Vászoly Formation	Hungary	A member of the family Ceratitidae.	
Immelites	Gen. et comb. nov	Valid	Bulot, Frau & Pictet	Early Cretaceous (Aptian)	Ganbadongshan Formation	China	A member of the family Acrioceratidae; a new genus for "Tonohamites" multituberculatus Immel & Guoxiong (2002).	
Jenslehmannella	Gen. et sp. nov	Valid	Bulot, Frau & Pictet	Early Cretaceous (Early Aptian)	Dariyan Formation	Iran	A member of the family Acrioceratidae. The type species is J. bangestanense.	
Karasyazites	Gen. et comb. nov	Valid	Mitta	Early Cretaceous		Russia	A member of the family Himalayitidae. The type species is "Subalpinites" bajarunasi Luppov.	
Klingerites	Gen. et comb. nov	Valid	Bulot, Frau & Pictet	Early Cretaceous (Aptian)		Argentina; Madagascar; South Africa	A member of the family Acrioceratidae; a new genus for "Toxoceratoides"? haughtoni Klinger & Kennedy (1977).	
Koiloceras sahibi	Sp. nov	Valid	Ware & Bucher in Ware et al.	Early Triassic	Lower Ceratite Limestone	Pakistan	A member of Ceratitida belonging to the group Meekocerataceae and the family Paranoritidae.	
Kossmaticeras (Kossmaticeras) kilenensis	Sp. nov	Valid	Alsen	Late Cretaceous (Coniacian)	Sølverbæk Formation	Greenland		
Kyoktites	Gen. et sp. et comb. nov	Valid	Ware & Bucher in Ware et al.	Early Triassic	Lower Ceratite Limestone	India; Pakistan	A member of the family Ophiceratidae. The type species is K. hebeiseni; genus also includes "Meekoceras" kyokticum von Krafft (1909).	
Leioceras hansrieberi	Sp. nov	Valid	Dietze & Schweigert	Middle Jurassic (Aalenian)	Opalinuston Formation	Germany	A member of the family Graphoceratidae.	
Leviclymenia ramula	Sp. nov	Valid	Hartenfels & Becker	Devonian (Famennian)		Morocco		
Lobitoceras	Gen. et comb. nov	Valid	Cooper	Early Cretaceous (Albian)		Angola	A member of the family Brancoceratidae. The type species is "Elobiceras" arietiforme Spath (1922); genus also includes L. decipiens (Spath, 1922), L. flexicostatum (Spath, 1922), L. irregulare (Spath, 1922), L. szajnochai (Spath, 1922) and L. spathianum (Haas, 1942).	
Loyezia jaenensis	Sp. nov	Valid	Vermeulen et al.	Early Cretaceous		Spain	A member of the family Crioceratitidae. Originally described as a species of Loyezia, but subsequently transferred to the genus Binelliceras by Vermeulen et al. (2019).	
Meekoceras bylundi	Sp. nov	Valid	Jenks & Brayard	Early Triassic		United States (Nevada)		
Montelloites	Gen. et sp. nov	Valid	Jenks & Brayard	Early Triassic		United States (Nevada)	A member of the family Galfettitidae. Genus includes new species M. stephensi.	
Moutaiceras	Gen. et comb. nov	Valid	Cooper	Early Cretaceous (Albian)		Angola	A member of the family Brancoceratidae; a new genus for "Sharpeiceras" goliath Haas (1942).	
Mullericeras gujiaoense	Sp. nov	Valid	Dai et al.	Early Triassic (Induan)	Daye Formation	China		
Mullericeras indusense	Sp. nov	Valid	Ware & Bucher in Ware et al.	Early Triassic	Ceratite Marls	Pakistan	A member of Ceratitida belonging to the group Meekocerataceae and the family Mullericeratidae.	
Mullericeras niazii	Sp. nov	Valid	Ware & Bucher in Ware et al.	Early Triassic	Ceratite Marls	India; Pakistan	A member of Ceratitida belonging to the group Meekocerataceae and the family Mullericeratidae.	
Mullericeras shigetai	Sp. nov	Valid	Ware & Bucher in Ware et al.	Early Triassic	Ceratite Marls	India; Pakistan	A member of Ceratitida belonging to the group Meekocerataceae and the family Mullericeratidae.	
Neocosmoceras eliasi	Sp. nov	Valid	Vašíček, Skupien & Jagt	Early Cretaceous (early Berriasian)	Štramberk Limestone	Czech Republic		
Neopetitclercia	Gen. et sp. nov	Valid	Schweigert & Kapitzke	Late Jurassic (Kimmeridgian)	Impressamergel Formation	Germany	A member of the family Strigoceratidae belonging to the subfamily Phlycticeratinae. The type species is N. jantschkei.	
Nodicoeloceras middlegatense	Sp. nov	Valid	Caruthers et al.	Early Jurassic (Lower Toarcian)		United States (Nevada)		
Nodicoeloceras nevadaense	Sp. nov	Valid	Caruthers et al.	Early Jurassic (Lower Toarcian)		United States (Nevada)		
Nodihungarites	Gen. et comb. et sp. nov	Valid	Vörös	Middle Triassic (Anisian)	Vászoly Formation	Hungary	A member of the family Hungaritidae. The type species is "Hungarites" bocsarensis Arthaber (1903); genus also includes new species N. vinczei.	
Orientosirenites	Gen. et sp. et comb. nov	Valid	Konstantinov	Late Triassic (Carnian)		Russia	A member of the family Sirenitidae. The type species is O. bytschkovi; genus also includes O. yakutensis (Kiparisova).	
Parafrechites cordeyi	Sp. nov	Valid	Ji & Bucher	Middle Triassic (Anisian)		Canada (British Columbia)		
Parahungarites	Gen. et comb. et sp. nov	Valid	Vörös	Middle Triassic (Anisian)	Vászoly Formation	Bosnia and Herzegovina; Hungary; Italy	A member of the family Ceratitidae. The type species is "Hungarites" arthaberi Diener (1899); genus also includes new species P. solyensis.	
Parakellnerites stuerzenbaumi	Sp. nov	Valid	Vörös	Middle Triassic (Anisian)	Vászoly Formation	Hungary	A member of the family Ceratitidae.	
Pashtunites	Gen. et comb. nov	Valid	Ware & Bucher in Ware et al.	Early Triassic		India; Pakistan	A member of Ceratitida belonging to the group Meekocerataceae and the family Paranoritidae. Genus includes "Koninckites" kraffti Spath (1934).	
Patrulia karachaica	Sp. nov	Valid	Mitta in Mitta & Sherstyukov	Middle Jurassic (Bajocian)		Russia (Karachay-Cherkessia)	A member of the family Stephanoceratidae.	
Phylloceras (Gyrophylloceras)	Nom. nov	Valid	Howarth in Énay & Howarth	Early Cretaceous		Tunisia	A subgenus of Phylloceras; a replacement name for Gyrophyllites Wiedmann (1963). The type species is Phylloceras lateumbilicatum Pervinquière (1907).	
Phyllopachyceras reymenti	Sp. nov	Valid	Riccardi	Early Cretaceous		Argentina		
Physodoceras widerai	Sp. nov	Valid	Scherzinger, Parent & Schweigert	Late Jurassic (Tithonian)	Hangende-Bankkalke Formation	Germany	A member of the family Aspidoceratidae.	
Prodactylioceras westgatenses	Sp. nov	Valid	Caruthers et al.	Early Jurassic (Upper Pliensbachian)		United States (Nevada)		
Proptychites wargalensis	Sp. nov	Valid	Ware & Bucher in Ware et al.	Early Triassic	Lower Ceratite Limestone	India; Pakistan	A member of Ceratitida belonging to the group Meekocerataceae and the family Proptychitidae.	
Protanisoceras hanaii	Sp. nov	Valid	Obata & Matsukawa	Early Cretaceous	Miyako Group	Japan		
Protengonoceras neolobitoides	Sp. nov	Valid	Robert et al.	Early Cretaceous		Mexico		
Protogrammoceras (Matteiceras) tipperi	Sp. nov	Valid	Caruthers et al.	Early Jurassic (Upper Pliensbachian)		United States (Nevada)		
Protolongaeviceras	Gen. et comb. nov		Knyazev, Meledina & Alifirov	Middle Jurassic (Callovian)		Russia	A member of Cardioceratidae. The type species is "Cadoceras (Streptocadoceras)" arcticoides Kiselev & Meledina (2004).	
Pseudosageceras simplelobatum	Sp. nov	Valid	Ware & Bucher in Ware et al.	Early Triassic	Ceratite Marls	India; Pakistan	A member of Ceratitida belonging to the group Sagecerataceae and the family Hedenstroemiidae.	
Reymenticoceras	Gen. et comb. nov	Valid	Kennedy	Late Cretaceous (Turonian)		Colombia	A member of Mammitinae. A new genus for "Mammites" nodosoidesappelatus Etayo-Serna (1979).	
Reynesocoeloceras corvalani	Sp. nov	Valid	Caruthers et al.	Early Jurassic (Upper Pliensbachian)		United States (Nevada)		
Richardreymentella	Gen. et comb. nov	Valid	Bulot, Frau & Pictet	Early Cretaceous (Late Aptian)		Argentina	A member of the family Acrioceratidae; a new genus for "Ancyloceras" patagonicum Stolley (1912).	
Rotopericyclus chaplini	Sp. nov	Valid	Work & Mason	Carboniferous (Tournaisian)	Borden Formation	United States (Kentucky)		
Rotopericyclus howardi	Sp. nov	Valid	Work & Mason	Carboniferous (Tournaisian)	Borden Formation	United States (Kentucky)		
Sakartveloceras	Gen. et comb. nov	Valid	Delanoy et al.	Early Cretaceous (Barremian)		Georgia; Iran; Turkmenistan	A member of Ancyloceratina belonging to the family Heteroceratidae. The type species is "Ammonites" securiformis Simonovich, Batsevich & Sorokin (1875); genus also includes "Colchidites" shaoriensis Djanélidzé (1926), "C." elissoae Kakabadze (1971), "C." tenuicostatus Kakabadze (1971) and "C." veleurensis Kakabadze (1971).	
Stevensites	Nom. nov	Valid	Énay in Énay & Howarth	Late Jurassic		Nepal	A replacement name for Stevensia Énay (2009). The type species is "Kossmatia" desmidopthycha Uhlig (1910).	
Stoppaniceras budaii	Sp. nov	Valid	Vörös	Middle Triassic (Anisian)	Vászoly Formation	Hungary	A member of the family Ceratitidae.	
Stoppaniceras hermanni	Sp. nov	Valid	Vörös	Middle Triassic (Anisian)	Vászoly Formation	Hungary	A member of the family Ceratitidae.	
Stoppaniceras rieberi	Sp. nov	Valid	Vörös	Middle Triassic (Anisian)	Vászoly Formation	Hungary; Italy	A member of the family Ceratitidae.	
Subacerites	Gen. et sp. nov	Valid	Ware & Bucher in Ware et al.	Early Triassic	Ceratite Marls	Pakistan	A member of Ceratitida of uncertain phylogenetic placement. Genus includes new species S. friski.	
Sutneria armigerum	Sp. nov	Valid	Énay	Late Jurassic (Kimmeridgian)		France		
Titanites (Paratitanites)	Subgen. et sp. nov	Valid	Kiselev in Kiselev & Rogov	Late Jurassic		Russia (Ulyanovsk Oblast; Yaroslavl Oblast)	The type species of the subgenus is Titanites (Paratitanites) manipulocostatus.	
Titanites (Pseudogalbanites)	Subgen. et sp. et comb. nov	Valid	Kiselev in Kiselev & Rogov	Late Jurassic		Russia (Yaroslavl Oblast)	The type species of the subgenus is Titanites (Pseudogalbanites) triceps; the subgenus also includes "Kerberites" mosquensis Mikhailov (1957).	
Tolimacoceras	Gen. et comb. nov	Valid	Kennedy	Late Cretaceous (Turonian)		Colombia	A member of Vascoceratidae. A new genus for "Paramammites" colombianus Etayo-Serna (1979).	
Toxancyloceras canuti	Sp. nov	Valid	Bert et al.	Early Cretaceous (Barremian)		France; Spain	A member of Ancyloceratidae.	
Transcaspiites transitionis	Sp. nov	Valid	Mitta	Early Cretaceous		Russia	A member of the family Himalayitidae.	
Transcaspiites tscheffkini	Sp. nov	Valid	Mitta	Early Cretaceous		Russia	A member of the family Himalayitidae.	
Ussuridiscus ornatus	Sp. nov	Valid	Ware & Bucher in Ware et al.	Early Triassic	Lower Ceratite Limestone	India; Pakistan	A member of Ceratitida belonging to the group Meekocerataceae and the family Mullericeratidae.	
Ussuridiscus ventriosus	Sp. nov	Valid	Ware & Bucher in Ware et al.	Early Triassic	Lower Ceratite Limestone	India; Pakistan	A member of Ceratitida belonging to the group Meekocerataceae and the family Mullericeratidae.	
Valdedorsella kasei	Sp. nov	Valid	Obata & Matsukawa	Early Cretaceous	Miyako Group	Japan		
Vavilovites meridialis	Sp. nov	Valid	Ware & Bucher in Ware et al.	Early Triassic		India	A member of Ceratitida belonging to the group Meekocerataceae and the family Paranoritidae.	
Vocontiiceras	Gen. et sp. nov	Valid	Diebold et al.	Late Cretaceous (Turonian)	Vocontian Basin	France	A member of the family Collignoniceratidae. Genus includes new species V. vocontiense.	
Zittelites	Nom. nov	Valid	Énay in Énay & Howarth	Late Jurassic		Spain	A replacement name for Zittelia Tavera Benitez (1985). The type species is "Ammonites" eudichotomus Zittel (1868).	

== Other cephalopods ==
=== Research ===
- A study on the relationship between egg size, maximum size of embryonic shells and the size of the initial chamber in extant cephalopods, and on its implications for inferring reproductive strategies of fossil cephalopods, is published by Laptikhovsky, Nikolaeva & Rogov (2018).
- Mironenko (2018) proposes a new hypothesis about the habits and feeding strategies of endocerids, interpreting them as planktotrophic cephalopods, and arguing that the largest of endocerids were suspension feeders.
- Antarcticeras nordenskjoeldi Doguzhaeva in Doguzhaeva et al. (2017), originally assigned to a new cephalopod subclass Paracoleoidea and the new order Antarcticerida, is reinterpreted as a possible member of Oegopsida by Fuchs, Keupp & Klug (2018); this reinterpretation is subsequently criticized and rejected by Doguzhaeva (2018).
- A study on the changes of body size of orthoconic cephalopods known from late Silurian to late Devonian sediments in Morocco is published by Pohle & Klug (2018).
- De Baets & Munnecke (2018) report presence of bimineralic, partially calcitic shell in two orthoconic nautiloids (members of the genus Dawsonoceras from the Silurian of Sweden, and members of the genus Spyroceras from the Devonian of Morocco), unlike extant and some fossil shelled cephalopods with an aragonitic shell wall, but similar to shells of some bivalves and gastropods.
- A study on the belemnites from the Lower Jurassic localities in Buttenheim (Germany) and Lixhausen (France), focusing on changes in spacing of septa that divided the phragmocone into chambers during the animals' growth, as well as their implications for the anatomy of belemnite hatchlings, is published by Wani et al. (2018).
- A study on belemnite rostra from two Toarcian belemnite battlefields in the Buttenheim and Teufelsgraben localities (Franconia, Germany), examining whether a rostrum size difference can be recognized between the studied samples, is published by Rita, De Baets & Schlott (2018).
- A pathological belemnite rostrum, indicative of the presence of a parasite during the lifetime of the belemnite, is described from the Cretaceous (Santonian) Bavnodde Greensand (Denmark) by Hoffmann et al. (2018).
- A study on the taxonomy, stratigraphy and palaeobiogeography of the late early Maastrichtian Belemnella lineage from the eastern part of the Roztocze Hills (Poland), comparing it with forms known from western Europe and easterly areas as far the peri-Aralian Sea area of Kazakhstan, and assessing their implications for inferring the taxonomic diversification and possible migratory patterns of members of the genus Belemnella in general, is published by Remin (2018).
- The oldest known fossil ink sac of the cuttlefish belonging to the genus Sepia, preserving original eumelanin and melanosomes, is described from the Miocene (Serravallian) deposits of the Vienna Basin by Košťák et al. (2018).
- Janiszewska et al. (2018) report aragonite preservation in ammonite and nautilid specimens from Upper Cretaceous siliceous limestone sections in Poland and Ukraine, and illustrate a broad spectrum of preservation of originally aragonitic structures in these specimens.

=== New taxa ===
Name	Novelty	Status	Authors	Age	Unit	Location	Notes	Images
Acanthoteuthis foliorostris	Sp. nov	Valid	Ippolitov	Middle Jurassic (Bathonian)		Russia	A belemnite belonging to the family Belemnotheutididae.	
Aphyctoceras friesenbichlerae	Sp. nov	Valid	Pohle & Klug	Devonian (early Eifelian)		Morocco	A nautiloid cephalopod belonging to the family Rutoceratidae.	
Arbuckleoceras	Gen. et comb. nov	Valid	Niko, Seuss & Mapes	Carboniferous (middle Pennsylvanian)	Boggy Formation	United States (Oklahoma)	A member of Orthocerida. Genus includes A. tricamerae (Smith).	
Armenoceras xizangense	Sp. nov	Valid	Fang et al.	Middle Ordovician	Lhasai Formation	China		
Astoceras floweri	Sp. nov	Valid	Pohle & Klug	Devonian (late Emsian)		Morocco	A member of Orthocerida belonging to the family Sichuanoceratidae.	
Barskovisella	Gen. et 6 sp. et comb. nov	Valid	Ippolitov	Middle Jurassic (Bathonian)		Poland; Russia; Switzerland	A belemnite belonging to the family Megateuthididae. The type species is B. issae; genus also includes B. pseudoishmensis, B. variabilis, B. barskovi, B. gracilis and B. renegata, as well as "Mesoteuthis" bajosicus Ivanova (1959) and "Nannobelus" parabellus Barskov in Mitta et al. (2004).	
Calliconites? shimizui	Sp. nov	Valid	Niko & Ehiro	Early Triassic (Olenekian)	Osawa Formation	Japan	A member of Aulacocerida belonging to the family Xiphoteuthididae.	
Castellanibelus vaubellensis	Sp. nov	Valid	Janssen	Early Cretaceous (Valanginian)		France; Spain; Switzerland	A belemnite belonging to the family Duvaliidae.	
Challinoria	Gen. et sp. nov	Valid	Ippolitov & Desai	Middle Jurassic (Bathonian)		India	A belemnite belonging to the family Megateuthididae. Genus includes new species C. challinori.	
Colorthoceras	Gen. et 3 sp. nov	Valid	Mutvei & Mapes	Carboniferous (Gzhelian)	Graham Formation	United States (Texas)	A coleoid with mixed orthocerid-coleoid characteristics. The type species is C. inflata; genus also includes new species C. tubulata and C. concavus.	
Cyclopoceras	Nom. nov	Valid	Mironenko	Devonian		Russia	A member of Discosorida belonging to the family Taxyceratidae; a replacement name for Cyclopites Zhuravleva (1962). The type species is "Gomphoceras" cyclops Wenjukoff (1886).	
Cylindroteuthis gelida	Sp. nov	Valid	de Lagausie in Dzyuba & de Lagausie	Middle Jurassic (Bajocian)	Yuryung-Tumus Formation	Russia	A belemnite belonging to the family Cylindroteuthididae.	
Discoceras lindstroemi	Sp. nov	Valid	Manda & Turek	Silurian (Wenlock)		Sweden		
Discoceras stridsbergi	Sp. nov	Valid	Manda & Turek	Silurian (Wenlock)		Sweden		
Dolorthoceras boggyense	Sp. nov	Valid	Niko, Seuss & Mapes	Carboniferous (middle Pennsylvanian)	Boggy Formation	United States (Oklahoma)		
Duvalia crassa	Sp. nov	Valid	Janssen	Early Cretaceous (Valanginian)		Bulgaria; France; Slovakia; Spain; Switzerland	A belemnite belonging to the family Duvaliidae.	
Duvalia elongata	Sp. nov	Valid	Janssen	Early Cretaceous (Valanginian)		France; Spain; Switzerland	A belemnite belonging to the family Duvaliidae.	
Duvalia kleini	Sp. nov	Valid	Janssen	Early Cretaceous (Valanginian)		France; Romania; Spain	A belemnite belonging to the family Duvaliidae.	
Duvalia superconstricta	Sp. nov	Valid	Janssen	Early Cretaceous (Valanginian)		Crimean Peninsula; France; Spain; Switzerland; Hungary?	A belemnite belonging to the family Duvaliidae.	
Eocylindroteuthis gracilenta	Sp. nov	Valid	Dzyuba & Schraer in Dzyuba et al.	Middle Jurassic (Bajocian)		United States (Alaska)	A belemnite.	
Eocylindroteuthis mariottii	Sp. nov	Valid	Ippolitov	Middle Jurassic (Bajocian)		Russia (Volgograd Oblast)	A belemnite.	
Eocylindroteuthis riegrafi	Sp. nov	Valid	Dzyuba & Schraer in Dzyuba et al.	Middle Jurassic (Bajocian)		United States (Alaska)	A belemnite.	
Eocylindroteuthis weisi	Sp. nov	Valid	Ippolitov	Middle Jurassic (Bajocian)		Russia (Volgograd Oblast)	A belemnite.	
Eocylindroteuthis yarkovi	Sp. nov	Valid	Ippolitov	Middle Jurassic (Bajocian)		Russia (Volgograd Oblast)	A belemnite.	
Geidoloceras hebeiseni	Sp. nov	Valid	Pohle & Klug	Devonian (Pragian)		Morocco	A member of Pseudorthocerida belonging to the family Pseudorthoceratidae.	
Hastites orphana	Sp. nov	Valid	Ippolitov	Middle Jurassic (Bajocian)		Russia (Volgograd Oblast)	A belemnite.	
"Hibolithes" lebresensis	Sp. nov	Valid	Janssen	Early Cretaceous (Valanginian)	Vocontian Basin	France	A belemnite belonging to the family Belemnopseidae.	
Homaloteuthis volgogradensis	Sp. nov	Valid	Ippolitov	Middle Jurassic (Bajocian)		Russia (Volgograd Oblast)	A belemnite.	
Idahoteuthis	Gen. et sp. nov	Valid	Doguzhaeva & Brayard in Doguzhaeva et al.	Early Triassic (Olenekian)	Thaynes Group	United States (Idaho)	A member of Coleoidea, possibly belonging to the order Myopsida. The type species is I. parisiana.	
Infundibuloceras kroegeri	Sp. nov	Valid	Pohle & Klug	Devonian (Emsian)		Morocco	A member of Orthocerida belonging to the family Orthoceratidae.	
Mesonaedyceras	Gen. et sp. nov	Valid	Pohle & Klug	Devonian (Eifelian)		Morocco	A member of Oncocerida belonging to the family Naedyceratidae. Genus includes new species M. laterobliquum.	
Miyagiteuthis	Gen. et comb. nov	Valid	Niko & Ehiro	Late Triassic (early Norian)	Chonomori Formation	Japan	A member of Aulacocerida belonging to the family Aulacoceratidae. The type species is "Dictyoconites" nipponicus Shimizu & Mabuti (1941).	
Nebraskaconus	Gen. et sp. nov	Valid	Mapes & Doguzhaeva	Carboniferous (Kasimovian)	Stark Shale	United States (Nebraska)	A member of Coleoidea. Genus includes new species N. whitei.	
Oklaconus	Gen. et sp. nov	Valid	Doguzhaeva & Mapes	Carboniferous (Moscovian)	Wewoka Shale	United States (Oklahoma)	A bactritoid-like coleoid. Genus includes new species O. okmulgeensis.	
Pabianiconus	Gen. et sp. nov	Valid	Mapes & Doguzhaeva	Carboniferous (Kasimovian)	Stark Shale	United States (Nebraska)	A member of Coleoidea. Genus includes new species P. starkensis.	
Pachtoceras laghdadense	Sp. nov	Valid	Pohle & Klug	Devonian (late Givetian)		Morocco	A member of Oncocerida belonging to the family Poterioceratidae.	
Pachyteuthis mittai	Sp. nov	Valid	Ippolitov	Middle Jurassic (Bathonian)		Russia	A belemnite belonging to the family Cylindroteuthididae.	
Paramegateuthis ovata	Sp. nov	Valid	de Lagausie & Dzyuba in Dzyuba & de Lagausie	Middle Jurassic (Bajocian)	Yuryung-Tumus Formation	Norway; Russia	A belemnite belonging to the family Megateuthididae.	
Paramegateuthis schurygini	Sp. nov	Valid	Dzyuba in Dzyuba & de Lagausie	Middle Jurassic (Bathonian)	Yuryung-Tumus Formation	Russia	A belemnite belonging to the family Megateuthididae.	
Parapassaloteuthis francoizbreutae	Sp. nov	Valid	Weis & Mariotti	Early Jurassic (Toarcian)		France	A belemnite.	
Patelloctopus	Gen. et sp. nov	Valid	Fuchs & Schweigert	Late Jurassic (Kimmeridgian)	Nusplingen Limestone	Germany	A member of the stem group of the Octopoda or a stem-incirrate. Genus includes new species P. ilgi.	
Phatthalungoceras	Gen. et sp. nov	Valid	Tongtherm & Nabhitabhata	Middle Triassic (Anisian)	Chaiburi Formation	Thailand	A member of the family Orthoceratidae. The type species is P. srisuki.	
Pseudendoplectoceras angustum	Sp. nov	Valid	Pohle & Klug	Devonian (Pragian)		Morocco	A member of Discosorida belonging to the family Phragmoceratidae.	
Pseudosimobelus	Gen. et sp. nov	Valid	Dzyuba & Schraer in Dzyuba et al.	Middle Jurassic (Bajocian)		United States (Alaska)	A belemnite. Genus includes new species P. tuxedniensis.	
Sepia fabianschwankei	Sp. nov	Valid	Košták & Jagt	Miocene	Twistringen Beds	Germany	A species of Sepia.	
Smithorthoceras	Gen. et comb. nov	Valid	Niko, Seuss & Mapes	Carboniferous (middle Pennsylvanian)	Boggy Formation	United States (Oklahoma)	A member of Orthocerida. Genus includes S. unicamera (Smith).	
Starkites	Gen. et sp. nov	Valid	Mapes & Doguzhaeva	Carboniferous (Kasimovian)	Stark Shale	United States (Nebraska)	A member of Coleoidea. Genus includes new species S. compressus.	
Subormoceras asymmetricum	Sp. nov	Valid	Pohle & Klug	Devonian (Pragian)		Morocco	A member of Pseudorthocerida belonging to the family Pseudorthoceratidae.	
Subtheoceras	Gen. et sp. nov	Valid	Pohle & Klug	Devonian (Pragian)		Morocco	A member of Orthocerida belonging to the family Orthoceratidae. Genus includes new species S. striatum.	
Sulphurnites	Gen. et sp. nov	Valid	Niko, Seuss & Mapes	Carboniferous (middle Pennsylvanian)	Boggy Formation	United States (Oklahoma)	A member of Orthocerida. Genus includes new species S. taffi.	
Unklesbayoceras	Gen. et sp. nov	Valid	Niko, Seuss & Mapes	Carboniferous (middle Pennsylvanian)	Boggy Formation	United States (Oklahoma)	A member of Orthocerida. Genus includes new species U. striatulum.	

== Gastropods ==
=== Research ===
- A study on the evolutionary history of endemic genera of Late Cretaceous shallow-marine gastropods from the rim of the Northeast Pacific (a region extending from the Alaska Peninsula southward to the northern part of Baja California Sur, Mexico) is published by Squires (2018).
- New fossil material of "Pleurotomaria" perlata is described from the Silurian Niagara Group (Ohio, United States) by Peel (2018), who interprets new fossils as indicating that "P." perlata wasn't a pleurotomariid vetigastropod, and transfers this species to the genus Isfarispira.
- A study on the effect of climatic cooling on the cannibalistic behaviour of members of the genus Falsilunatia from the Eocene La Meseta Formation (Antarctica) is published by Dietl, Nagel-Myers & Aronson (2018).
- A study on predatory traces in gastropod specimens collected from middle Eocene beds of the Paris Basin and the lower Miocene Chipola Formation in Florida, and on their implications for inferring possible correlations between the shell morphology and the vulnerability to predators in fossil marine gastropods, is published by Ishikawa, Kase & Tsutsui (2018).

=== New taxa ===
Name	Novelty	Status	Authors	Age	Unit	Location	Notes	Images
Acirsa sceauxsensis	Sp. nov	Valid	Landau, Ceulemans & Van Dingenen	Miocene (Tortonian)		France	A species of Acirsa.	
Adelphotectonica bieleri	Sp. nov	Valid	Ceulemans, Van Dingenen & Landau	Pliocene (Zanclean)		France	A member of the family Architectonicidae.	
Aegopinella depressula	Sp. nov	Valid	Harzhauser & Neubauer	Miocene		Poland	A species of Aegopinella.	
Allmoniella	Gen. et sp. et comb. nov	Valid	Dolin & Dockery	Eocene (Bartonian)	Cook Mountain Formation	United States (Louisiana; Mississippi)	A member of Ovulidae. Genus includes new species A. magnolia, as well as "Cypraea" vaughani Johnson (1899).	
Alvania acuticarinata	Nom. nov	Valid	Landau, Ceulemans & Van Dingenen	Miocene (Tortonian)		France	A species of Alvania; a replacement name for Delphinula carinata Millet (1854).	
Alvania armata	Sp. nov	Valid	Landau, Ceulemans & Van Dingenen	Miocene (Tortonian)		France	A species of Alvania.	
Alvania couffoni	Sp. nov	Valid	Landau, Ceulemans & Van Dingenen	Miocene (Tortonian)		France	A species of Alvania.	
Alvania fezata	Sp. nov	Valid	Landau, Ceulemans & Van Dingenen	Miocene (Tortonian)		France	A species of Alvania.	
Alvania globosa	Sp. nov	Valid	Landau, Ceulemans & Van Dingenen	Miocene (Tortonian)		France	A species of Alvania.	
Alvania insulsa	Sp. nov	Valid	Landau, Ceulemans & Van Dingenen	Miocene (Tortonian)		France	A species of Alvania.	
Alvania josephineae	Sp. nov	Valid	Landau, Ceulemans & Van Dingenen	Miocene (Tortonian)		France	A species of Alvania.	
Alvania lachrimula	Sp. nov	Valid	Landau, Ceulemans & Van Dingenen	Miocene (Tortonian)		France	A species of Alvania.	
Alvania milleti	Nom. nov	Valid	Landau, Ceulemans & Van Dingenen	Miocene (Tortonian)		France	A species of Alvania; a replacement name for Rissoa suturalis Millet (1865).	
Alvania milletispinosa	Sp. nov	Valid	Landau, Ceulemans & Van Dingenen	Miocene (Tortonian)		France	A species of Alvania.	
Alvania miocalasi	Sp. nov	Valid	Landau, Ceulemans & Van Dingenen	Miocene (Tortonian)		France	A species of Alvania.	
Alvania miolactea	Sp. nov	Valid	Landau, Ceulemans & Van Dingenen	Miocene (Tortonian)		France	A species of Alvania.	
Alvania napoleoni	Sp. nov	Valid	Landau, Ceulemans & Van Dingenen	Miocene (Tortonian)		France	A species of Alvania.	
Alvania parasusieae	Sp. nov	Valid	Landau, Ceulemans & Van Dingenen	Miocene (Tortonian)		France	A species of Alvania.	
Alvania redoniana	Sp. nov	Valid	Landau, Ceulemans & Van Dingenen	Miocene (Tortonian)		France	A species of Alvania.	
Alvania renauleauensis	Sp. nov	Valid	Landau, Ceulemans & Van Dingenen	Miocene (Tortonian)		France	A species of Alvania.	
Alvania subtiliangulosa	Sp. nov	Valid	Landau, Ceulemans & Van Dingenen	Miocene (Tortonian)		France	A species of Alvania.	
Alvania susieae	Sp. nov	Valid	Landau, Ceulemans & Van Dingenen	Miocene (Tortonian)		France	A species of Alvania.	
Alvania tenuisculpturata	Sp. nov	Valid	Landau, Ceulemans & Van Dingenen	Miocene (Tortonian)		France	A species of Alvania.	
Alvania turtaudierei	Sp. nov	Valid	Landau, Ceulemans & Van Dingenen	Miocene (Tortonian)		France	A species of Alvania.	
Amalda acutapex	Sp. nov	Valid	Raven & Recourt	Miocene		Brunei	A species of Amalda.	
Amalda bruneiana	Sp. nov	Valid	Harzhauser et al.	Miocene (Tortonian)	Seria Formation	Brunei	A species of Amalda.	
Amalda miriensis	Sp. nov	Valid	Raven & Recourt	Miocene		Malaysia	A species of Amalda.	
Angaria complanata	Sp. nov	Valid	Gain, Belliard & Le Renard	Eocene		France	A species of Angaria.	
Angaria constantinensis	Sp. nov	Valid	Gain, Belliard & Le Renard	Eocene		France	A species of Angaria.	
Angaria nigellensis	Sp. nov	Valid	Gain, Belliard & Le Renard	Eocene		France	A species of Angaria.	
Angaria scutellata	Sp. nov	Valid	Gain, Belliard & Le Renard	Eocene		France	A species of Angaria.	
Aphanitoma marqueti	Sp. nov	Valid	Ceulemans, Van Dingenen & Landau	Pliocene (Zanclean)		France	A species of Aphanitoma.	
Aporrhais sauditica	Sp. nov	Valid	Ferrari et al.	Jurassic		Saudi Arabia	A species of Aporrhais.	
Archierato antonioi	Sp. nov	Valid	Fehse & Villacampa	Miocene		United States (Florida)	A member of the family Eratoidae.	
Archimediella sancticlementensis	Sp. nov	Valid	Landau, Ceulemans & Van Dingenen	Miocene (Tortonian)		France		
Architectonica beetsi	Sp. nov	Valid	Harzhauser et al.	Miocene (Tortonian)	Seria Formation	Brunei	A species of Architectonica.	
Asthenotoma lanceolata	Sp. nov	Valid	Ceulemans, Van Dingenen & Landau	Pliocene (Zanclean)		France	A species of Asthenotoma.	
Ataxocerithium turbineum	Sp. nov	Valid	Landau, Ceulemans & Van Dingenen	Miocene (Tortonian)		France	A species of Ataxocerithium.	
Athleta (Volutospina) delvallei	Sp. nov	Valid	Astibia, Merle & Pacaud in Astibia et al.	Eocene (Bartonian-?early Priabonian)	Ardanatz Sandstone; Ilundain Marl Formation	Spain	A species of Athleta.	
Athleta nikolaji	Sp. nov	Valid	Schnetler & Nielsen	Paleocene (Selandian)		Denmark	A species of Athleta.	
Bela falbalae	Sp. nov	Valid	Ceulemans, Van Dingenen & Landau	Pliocene (Zanclean)		France	A species of Bela.	
Bernaya amandula	Sp. nov	Valid	Pacaud	Eocene (Bartonian)		France	A species of Bernaya.	
Biconomphalus	Gen. et sp. nov	Valid	Szabó	Early Jurassic (Sinemurian to Pliensbachian)	Hierlatz Limestone	Austria	A possible member of the family Eucyclidae. The type species is B. singularis.	
Biomphalaria manya	Sp. nov	Valid	Cabrera & Martínez	Late Cretaceous	Queguay Formation	Uruguay	A species of Biomphalaria.	
Biplica paleocenica	Sp. nov	Valid	Amano & Jenkins in Amano, Jenkins & Kurita	Paleocene	Katsuhira Formation	Japan		
Bithynia erzurumensis	Sp. nov	Valid	Harzhauser, Neubauer & Hoşgör	Late Oligocene or early Miocene	Susuz Formation	Turkey	A species of Bithynia.	
Bittium crassum	Sp. nov	Valid	Landau, Ceulemans & Van Dingenen	Miocene (Tortonian)		France	A species of Bittium.	
Bittium gallicum	Sp. nov	Valid	Landau, Ceulemans & Van Dingenen	Miocene (Tortonian)		France	A species of Bittium.	
Bittium pingue	Sp. nov	Valid	Landau, Ceulemans & Van Dingenen	Miocene (Tortonian)		France	A species of Bittium.	
Bittium renauleauense	Sp. nov	Valid	Landau, Ceulemans & Van Dingenen	Miocene (Tortonian)		France	A species of Bittium.	
Boreocomitas inouei	Sp. nov	Valid	Amano, Hryniewicz & Jenkins	Paleocene	Katsuhira Formation	Japan	A member of the family Pseudomelatomidae.	
Borystheniella	Gen. et 3 sp. nov	Valid	Pacaud	Eocene (Priabonian)		Ukraine	A member of the family Cypraeidae. The type species is B. incisa; genus also includes new species B. gracilenta and B. zamberlani.	
Caballasea	Gen. et sp et comb. nov	Valid	DeVries	Early Paleogene	Carroza Formation; Pisco Basin (Caballas Formation)	Mexico; Peru	The type species is C. segmentata; genus also includes "Pachychilus (Pachychiloides)" lawtoni Perrilliat et al. (2008).	
Callina waldeni	Sp. nov	Valid	Groh & De Mattia in De Mattia, Neiber & Groh	Quaternary		Portugal (Madeira)	A member of Helicoidea belonging to the family Geomitridae.	
Calliotropis (Riselloidea) faustiankensis	Sp. nov	Valid	Ferrari & Kaim	Middle Jurassic		Poland	A species of Calliotropis.	
Calliotropis (Riselloidea) lukovensis	Sp. nov	Valid	Ferrari & Kaim	Middle Jurassic		Poland	A species of Calliotropis.	
Calliovarica oregonensis	Sp. nov	Valid	Hickman	Early late Eocene	Nestucca Formation	United States (Oregon)	A member of the family Chilodontaidae.	
Callotrochus? avernoides	Sp. nov	Valid	Szabó	Early Jurassic (Sinemurian to Pliensbachian)	Hierlatz Limestone	Austria	A possible member of the family Calliostomatidae.	
Carnevalea santiapillaii	Sp. nov	Valid	Epa et al.	Late Oligocene	Nsungwe Formation	Tanzania	A member of the family Ampullariidae.	
Carychium stworzewiczae	Sp. nov	Valid	Harzhauser & Neubauer	Miocene		Poland	A species of Carychium.	
Cassis calusa	Sp. nov	Valid	Petuch & Berschauer	Pleistocene	Caloosahatchee Formation	United States (Florida)	A species of Cassis.	
Cassis powelli	Sp. nov	Valid	Petuch & Berschauer	Pleistocene	Caloosahatchee Formation	United States (Florida)	A species of Cassis.	
Cerithiella malakae	Sp. nov	Valid	Schnetler & Nielsen	Paleocene (Selandian)		Denmark	A species of Cerithiella.	
Cerithiella salmae	Sp. nov	Valid	Schnetler & Nielsen	Paleocene (Selandian)		Denmark	A species of Cerithiella.	
Cerithiopsis andreae	Sp. nov	Valid	Schnetler & Nielsen	Paleocene (Selandian)		Denmark	A species of Cerithiopsis.	
Cerithiopsis boanderseni	Sp. nov	Valid	Schnetler & Nielsen	Paleocene (Selandian)		Denmark	A species of Cerithiopsis.	
Cerithiopsis cerithiopsoides	Sp. nov	Valid	Landau, Ceulemans & Van Dingenen	Miocene (Tortonian)		France	A species of Cerithiopsis.	
Cerithiopsis emilieae	Sp. nov	Valid	Schnetler & Nielsen	Paleocene (Selandian)		Denmark	A species of Cerithiopsis.	
Cerithiopsis esterae	Sp. nov	Valid	Landau, Ceulemans & Van Dingenen	Miocene (Tortonian)		France	A species of Cerithiopsis.	
?Cerithiopsis luiseae	Sp. nov	Valid	Schnetler & Nielsen	Paleocene (Selandian)		Denmark	Possibly a species of Cerithiopsis.	
Cerithiopsis mira	Sp. nov	Valid	Landau, Ceulemans & Van Dingenen	Miocene (Tortonian)		France	A species of Cerithiopsis.	
Cerithium miocanariensis	Sp. nov	Valid	Martín-González & Vera-Peláez in Martín-González et al.	Late Miocene		Spain (Canary Islands)	A species of Cerithium.	
Chelidonura radwanskii	Sp. nov	Valid	Bałuk	Miocene (Langhian)	Korytnica Basin	Poland	A species of Chelidonura.	
Clathurella pierreaimei	Sp. nov	Valid	Ceulemans, Van Dingenen & Landau	Pliocene (Zanclean)		France	A species of Clathurella.	
Clavatula helwerdae	Sp. nov	Valid	Ceulemans, Van Dingenen & Landau	Pliocene (Zanclean)		France	A species of Clavatula.	
Clavogyra	Gen. et sp. nov	Valid	Leroy	Eocene (Ypresian)	Paris Basin	France	A member of the family Turbinellidae. The type species is C. ledeei.	
Cleotrivia gallica	Sp. nov	Valid	Landau, Ceulemans & Van Dingenen	Miocene (Tortonian)		France	A species of Cleotrivia.	
Coelostylina hydrobiformis	Sp. nov	Valid	Nützel & Ware in Nützel et al.	Early Triassic		Pakistan	A member of the family Coelostylinidae.	
Coelostylina micropunctata	Sp. nov	Valid	Nützel, Kaim & Grădinaru	Middle Triassic (Anisian)		Romania	A member of the family Coelostylinidae.	
Conasprella paupera	Sp. nov	Valid	Harzhauser et al.	Miocene (Tortonian)	Seria Formation	Brunei	A species of Conasprella.	
Conasprella trianginodus	Sp. nov	Valid	Harzhauser et al.	Miocene (Tortonian)	Seria Formation	Brunei	A species of Conasprella.	
Conus fuerteventurensis	Sp. nov	Valid	Vera-Peláez & Martín-González in Martín-González et al.	Late Miocene		Spain (Canary Islands)	A species of Conus.	
Conus (Stephanoconus) woodringi	Sp. nov	Valid	Hendricks	Miocene	Gatun Formation	Panama	A species of Conus.	
Crassispira strangulata	Sp. nov	Valid	Harzhauser et al.	Miocene (Tortonian)	Seria Formation	Brunei	A species of Crassispira.	
Crassitonella lozoueti	Sp. nov	Valid	Landau, Ceulemans & Van Dingenen	Miocene (Tortonian)		France		
Cretatortulosa	Gen. et sp. nov	Valid	Yu, Wang & Pan	Late Cretaceous (Cenomanian)	Burmese amber	Myanmar	A member of the family Pupinidae. Genus includes new species C. multilinea.	
Cristispira caballasensis	Sp. nov	Valid	DeVries	Early Paleogene	Pisco Basin (Caballas Formation)	Peru	A member of the family Turritellidae.	
Csigabaga	Gen. et sp. nov	Valid	Szabó	Early Jurassic (Sinemurian to Pliensbachian)	Hierlatz Limestone	Austria	A member of the family Proconulidae. The type species is C. nillae.	
Cupaniella praebiplicata	Sp. nov	Valid	Szabó	Early Jurassic (Sinemurian to Pliensbachian)	Hierlatz Limestone	Austria	A member of the family Chilodontaidae.	
Cymbiola ambugensis	Sp. nov	Valid	Harzhauser et al.	Miocene (Tortonian)	Seria Formation	Brunei	A species of Cymbiola.	
Cymbovula (Winklea)	Subgen. nov	Valid	Dolin & Dockery	Eocene (Bartonian)	Cook Mountain Formation	United States (Alabama)	A subgenus of Cymbovula. The subgenus includes Cymbovula transovuloides (Schilder, 1926).	
Cypraedia durandae	Sp. nov	Valid	Dolin & Aguerre	Eocene (Bartonian)		France	A species of Cypraedia.	
Cypraedia fragilis	Sp. nov	Valid	Dolin & Aguerre	Eocene (Bartonian)		France	A species of Cypraedia.	
Cypraedia insperata	Sp. nov	Valid	Pacaud	Eocene (Priabonian)		Ukraine	A species of Cypraedia.	
Cypraedia prunellum	Sp. nov	Valid	Dolin & Aguerre	Eocene (Bartonian)		France	A species of Cypraedia.	
Cypraeorbis angustior	Sp. nov	Valid	Checchi & Zamberlan	Eocene (late Ypresian-early Lutetian)		Italy	A species of Cypraeorbis.	
Cypraeorbis longula	Sp. nov	Valid	Checchi & Zamberlan	Eocene (late Ypresian-early Lutetian)		Italy	A species of Cypraeorbis.	
Dermomurex nemethi	Sp. nov	Valid	Kovács	Middle Miocene	Sámsonháza Formation	Hungary	A species of Dermomurex.	
Desbruyeresia belliatus	Sp. nov	Valid	Hybertsen & Kiel	Middle Eocene	Humptulips Formation	United States (Washington)	A species of Desbruyeresia.	
Discopsis pseudocanui	Sp. nov	Valid	Landau, Ceulemans & Van Dingenen	Miocene (Tortonian)		France	A species of Discopsis.	
Dizoniopsis boucheti	Sp. nov	Valid	Landau, Ceulemans & Van Dingenen	Miocene (Tortonian)		France	A species of Dizoniopsis.	
Dolomena bruneiensis	Sp. nov	Valid	Harzhauser et al.	Miocene (Tortonian)	Seria Formation	Brunei	A species of Dolomena.	
Duplicaria aequalis	Sp. nov	Valid	Harzhauser et al.	Miocene (Tortonian)	Seria Formation	Brunei	A species of Duplicaria.	
Eographis	Gen. et sp. nov	Valid	Nützel & Ware in Nützel et al.	Early Triassic		Pakistan	A member of the family Hyalogyrinidae. The type species is E. microlineata.	
Eotrivia amitrovi	Sp. nov	Disputed	Pacaud	Eocene (Priabonian)		Ukraine	Fehse (2021) considered this species to be a junior synonym of Eotrivia faracii (de Gregorio, 1880).	
Eotrivia ledoni	Sp. nov	Valid	Pacaud	Eocene (Lutetian)		France		
?Epetrium flemmingi	Sp. nov	Valid	Schnetler & Nielsen	Paleocene (Selandian)		Denmark		
?Epetrium pernilleae	Sp. nov	Valid	Schnetler & Nielsen	Paleocene (Selandian)		Denmark		
Erato lozoueti	Sp. nov	Valid	Fehse	Oligocene (Chattian)		France	A species of Erato.	
Erato prodromos	Nom. nov	Valid	Fehse	Oligocene (Chattian)		France	A species of Erato. The original specific name was Erato precursor Fehse (2018), which turned out to be preoccupied by Erato praecursor Cossmann & Pissarro (1905).	
Eratopsis zoltani	Sp. nov	Valid	Fehse	Miocene		Hungary	A member of the family Eratoidae.	
Eratotrivia neptis	Sp. nov	Valid	Pacaud	Eocene (Priabonian)		Ukraine		
Eucyclomphalus? subgradatus	Sp. nov	Valid	Szabó	Early Jurassic (Sinemurian to Pliensbachian)	Hierlatz Limestone	Austria	A member of the family Eucycloscalidae.	
Eucypraedia bertechae	Sp. nov	Valid	Dolin & Aguerre	Eocene (Bartonian)		France		
Eucypraedia longiuscula	Sp. nov	Valid	Dolin & Aguerre	Eocene (Bartonian)		France		
Eucypraedia ocliferia	Sp. nov	Valid	Dolin & Aguerre	Eocene (Bartonian)		France		
Euphemites rollinsi	Sp. nov	Valid	Harper	Carboniferous (Mississippian)	Gilmore City Formation	United States (Iowa)	A member of Bellerophontoidea.	
Eurocystina	Gen. et sp. nov	Valid	Harzhauser & Neubauer	Miocene		Poland	A member of the family Pristilomatidae. The type species is E. nordsiecki.	
Euryalox applanatus	Sp. nov	Valid	Nützel, Kaim & Grădinaru	Middle Triassic (Anisian)		Romania	A member of the family Phymatopleuridae.	
Euthema	Gen. et sp. nov	Valid	Yu, Wang & Pan	Late Cretaceous (Cenomanian)	Burmese amber	Myanmar	A member of the family Diplommatinidae. Genus includes new species E. naggsi.	
Euthria viciani	Sp. nov	Valid	Kovács	Middle Miocene	Leitha Limestone Formation	Hungary	A species of Euthria.	
Exilia frejae	Sp. nov	Valid	Schnetler & Nielsen	Paleocene (Selandian)		Denmark	A species of Exilia.	
Ficus parvissima	Sp. nov	Valid	Harzhauser et al.	Miocene (Tortonian)	Seria Formation	Brunei	A species of Ficus.	
Garviea	Gen. et comb. nov	Valid	Dolin & Dockery	Eocene (Bartonian)	Cook Mountain Formation	Trinidad and Tobago; United States (Alabama; Mississippi; Texas)	A member of Cypraeidae belonging to the subfamily Gisortiinae. The type species is "Cypraea" nuculoides Aldrich (1903); genus also includes "Archicypraea" degenerata Schilder (1939).	
Gastrocopta (Albinula) polonica	Sp. nov	Valid	Harzhauser & Neubauer	Miocene		Poland	A species of Gastrocopta.	
Gemmula sculpturata	Sp. nov	Valid	Harzhauser et al.	Miocene (Tortonian)	Seria Formation	Brunei	A species of Gemmula.	
Genota maximei	Nom. nov	Valid	Ceulemans, Van Dingenen & Landau	Miocene		France	A species of Genota; a replacement name for Pleurotoma insignis Millet, non Edwards, 1861.	
Gibbula tindayaensis	Sp. nov	Valid	Martín-González & Vera-Peláez in Martín-González et al.	Late Miocene		Spain (Canary Islands)	A species of Gibbula.	
Gisortia khargaensis	Sp. nov	Valid	Hewaidy, El Qot & Moneer	Early Eocene	El Rufuf Formation	Egypt		
Gymnobela santorsolae	Sp. nov	Valid	Tabanelli	Pliocene and Pleistocene (Gelasian)		Italy	A species of Gymnobela.	
Haedropleura fratemcontii	Sp. nov	Valid	Ceulemans, Van Dingenen & Landau	Pliocene (Zanclean)		France	A species of Haedropleura.	
Hemifusus charlieleei	Sp. nov	Valid	Harzhauser et al.	Miocene (Tortonian)	Seria Formation	Brunei	A species of Hemifusus.	
Hierlatzella	Gen. et sp. nov	Valid	Szabó	Early Jurassic (Sinemurian to Pliensbachian)	Hierlatz Limestone	Austria	A member of the family Coelostylinidae. The type species is H. arcana.	
Hippochrenes nautagarona	Sp. nov	Valid	Pacaud, Teodori & Bilotte	Late Cretaceous (Maastrichtian)		France	A member of the family Rostellariidae.	
Hystricella microcarinata	Sp. nov	Valid	De Mattia & Groh in De Mattia, Neiber & Groh	Quaternary		Portugal (Madeira)	A species of Hystricella.	
Indomitrella acuticonica	Sp. nov	Valid	Harzhauser et al.	Miocene (Tortonian)	Seria Formation	Brunei	A species of Indomitrella.	
Inella alia	Sp. nov	Valid	Landau, Ceulemans & Van Dingenen	Miocene (Tortonian)		France	A species of Inella.	
Inella rolani	Sp. nov	Valid	Landau, Ceulemans & Van Dingenen	Miocene (Tortonian)		France	A species of Inella.	
Jujubinus ajachaensis	Sp. nov	Valid	Martín-González & Vera-Peláez in Martín-González et al.	Late Miocene		Spain (Canary Islands)	A species of Jujubinus.	
Kangilioptera gundstrupensis	Sp. nov	Valid	Schnetler & Nielsen	Paleocene (Selandian)		Denmark		
Karsaconulus	Gen. et sp. nov	Valid	Szabó	Early Jurassic (Sinemurian to Pliensbachian)	Hierlatz Limestone	Austria	A member of the family Proconulidae. The type species is K. robustus.	
Kericserispira	Nom. nov	Valid	Szabó	Early Jurassic (Sinemurian to Pliensbachian)	Hierlatz Limestone	Austria; France; Hungary	A possible member of Pithodeidae; a replacement name for Foveolaria Szabó (2016).	
Klavlia	Gen. et sp. nov	Valid	Mazaev	Middle Permian	Krasnyi Yar Beds	Russia (Samara Oblast)	A member of the family Holopeidae belonging to the subfamily Gyronematinae. Genus includes new species K. klavlia.	
Ladinaticella simionescui	Sp. nov	Valid	Nützel, Kaim & Grădinaru	Middle Triassic (Anisian)		Romania	A member of Neritimorpha belonging to the family Scalaneritinidae.	
Laevicaspia vinarskii	Sp. nov	Valid	Neubauer et al.	Late Pleistocene		Russia (Astrakhan Oblast)	A member of the family Hydrobiidae.	
Lanistes microovum	Sp. nov	Valid	Epa et al.	Late Oligocene	Nsungwe Formation	Tanzania	A species of Lanistes.	
Lanistes nsungwensis	Sp. nov	Valid	Epa et al.	Late Oligocene	Nsungwe Formation	Tanzania	A species of Lanistes.	
Lanistes rukwaensis	Sp. nov	Valid	Epa et al.	Late Oligocene	Nsungwe Formation	Tanzania	A species of Lanistes.	
Lanistes songwellipticus	Sp. nov	Valid	Epa et al.	Late Oligocene	Nsungwe Formation	Tanzania	A species of Lanistes.	
Lanistes songweovum	Sp. nov	Valid	Epa et al.	Late Oligocene	Nsungwe Formation	Tanzania	A species of Lanistes.	
Leiostyla piserai	Sp. nov	Valid	Harzhauser & Neubauer	Miocene		Poland; Austria?	A species of Leiostyla.	
Levifusus metteae	Sp. nov	Valid	Schnetler & Nielsen	Paleocene (Selandian)		Denmark		
Lophospira telleri	Sp. nov	Valid	Peel	Silurian	Racine Formation	United States (Illinois; Wisconsin)	A member of the family Lophospiridae.	
Lozouetina	Gen. et comb. nov	Valid	Dolin & Dockery	Eocene (Lutetian and Bartonian)	Biarritzian Formation; Cook Mountain Formation; Kosciusko Formation	France; Spain; United States (Mississippi; South Carolina; Texas)	A member of the family Ovulidae belonging to the subfamily Pediculariinae. The type species is "Trivia" recluzi Cossmann (1897); genus also includes "Cypraea" kennedyi Harris (1895).	
Macromphalina morgani	Sp. nov	Valid	Landau, Ceulemans & Van Dingenen	Miocene (Tortonian)		France	A species of Macromphalina.	
?Mangelia stoutjesdijki	Sp. nov	Valid	Schnetler & Nielsen	Paleocene (Selandian)		Denmark	Possibly a species of Mangelia.	
Mannegaardina	Gen. et sp. nov	Valid	Frýda, Ebbestad & Frýdová	Silurian (Gorstian)		Sweden	A member of Porcellioidea. Genus includes new species M. hedei.	
Marmolatella iordanae	Sp. nov	Valid	Nützel, Kaim & Grădinaru	Middle Triassic (Anisian)		Romania	A member of Neritimorpha belonging to the family Naticopsidae.	
Martinietta kadolskyi	Sp. nov	Valid	Harzhauser & Neubauer	Miocene		Poland	A member of the family Hydrobiidae.	
Mcleaniella	Gen. et comb. nov	Valid	Pacaud	Paleocene		France	A member of the family Liotiidae; a new genus for "Solarium" danae d'Orbigny (1850).	
Meekospira baytuganensis	Sp. nov	Valid	Mazaev	Middle Permian	Baitugan Beds	Russia (Samara Oblast)	A member of the family Meekospiridae.	
Melanella indicaformis	Sp. nov	Valid	DeVries	Early Paleogene	Pisco Basin (Caballas Formation)	Peru	A species of Melanella.	
Menathais viciani	Sp. nov	Valid	Kovács	Middle Miocene	Sámsonháza Formation	Hungary	A member of the family Muricidae.	
Mennoia	Gen. et sp. nov	Valid	Harzhauser & Neubauer	Miocene		Poland	A member of Limacoidea of uncertain phylogenetic placement. The type species is M. sculpturata.	
Monophorus renauleauensis	Sp. nov	Valid	Landau, Ceulemans & Van Dingenen	Miocene (Tortonian)		France	A species of Monophorus.	
Morula mionigra	Sp. nov	Valid	Martín-González in Martín-González et al.	Late Miocene		Spain (Canary Islands)	A species of Morula.	
Murchisonietta	Gen. et sp. nov	Valid	Nützel, Kaim & Grădinaru	Middle Triassic (Anisian)		Romania	A possible member of the family Goniasmatidae. Genus includes new species M. acuta.	
Nassarius pseudoovum	Sp. nov	Valid	Harzhauser et al.	Miocene (Tortonian)	Seria Formation	Brunei	A species of Nassarius.	
Nerita squatina	Sp. nov	Valid	DeVries	Early Paleogene	Pisco Basin (Caballas Formation)	Peru	A species of Nerita.	
Neritaria kamyshlensis	Sp. nov	Valid	Mazaev	Middle Permian	Krasnyi Yar Beds	Russia (Samara Oblast)	A member of the family Neritidae.	
Neritoptyx hogansoni	Sp. nov	Valid	Erickson	Late Cretaceous (Maastrichtian)	Fox Hills Formation	United States		
Neubertella	Gen. et sp. nov	Valid	Harzhauser & Neubauer	Miocene		Poland	A member of Limacoidea of uncertain phylogenetic placement. The type species is N. pulchra.	
Neverita majimai	Sp. nov	Valid	Amano & Jenkins in Amano, Jenkins & Kurita	Paleocene	Katsuhira Formation	Japan	A species of Neverita.	
Ninglangella samarensis	Sp. nov	Valid	Mazaev	Middle Permian	Krasnyi Yar Beds	Russia (Samara Oblast)	A member of the family Meekospiridae.	
Niveria cylindriclementi	Sp. nov	Valid	Landau, Ceulemans & Van Dingenen	Miocene (Tortonian)		France	A species of Niveria.	
Nodifaunus gainesi	Sp. nov	Valid	DeVries	Early Paleogene	Pisco Basin (Caballas Formation)	Peru		
Obesula marshalli	Sp. nov	Valid	Landau, Ceulemans & Van Dingenen	Miocene (Tortonian)		France		
Ocinebrina landaui	Sp. nov	Valid	Kovács	Middle Miocene	Dej Formation	Romania	A species of Ocinebrina.	
Occidentina	Gen. et comb. nov	Valid	Harzhauser & Neubauer	Miocene		Austria; Hungary; Poland	A member of the family Diplommatinidae. The type species is "Adelopoma" martensi Andreae (1902).	
Oligodia chauvereauensis	Sp. nov	Valid	Landau, Ceulemans & Van Dingenen	Miocene (Tortonian)		France		
Oliva balteata	Sp. nov	Valid	Raven & Recourt	Miocene		Malaysia	A species of Oliva.	
Oliva bekenuensis	Sp. nov	Valid	Raven & Recourt	Miocene		Malaysia	A species of Oliva.	
Oliva curta	Sp. nov	Valid	Raven & Recourt	Miocene		Malaysia	A species of Oliva.	
Oliva telescopica	Sp. nov	Valid	Raven & Recourt	Miocene		Malaysia	A species of Oliva.	
Olivella microstriata	Sp. nov	Valid	Raven & Recourt	Miocene		Brunei	A species of Olivella.	
Ondina asterixi	Sp. nov	Valid	Ceulemans, Van Dingenen & Landau	Pliocene (Zanclean)		France	A species of Ondina.	
Onoba fragilis	Sp. nov	Valid	Landau, Ceulemans & Van Dingenen	Miocene (Tortonian)		France	A species of Onoba.	
Onoba incisa	Sp. nov	Valid	Landau, Ceulemans & Van Dingenen	Miocene (Tortonian)		France	A species of Onoba.	
Onoba redoniensis	Sp. nov	Valid	Landau, Ceulemans & Van Dingenen	Miocene (Tortonian)		France	A species of Onoba.	
Orbitestella dioi	Sp. nov	Valid	Hybertsen & Kiel	Middle Eocene	Humptulips Formation	United States (Washington)	A member of the family Orbitestellidae.	
Ornopsis? barisensis	Sp. nov	Valid	Hewaidy, El Qot & Moneer	Early Paleocene	Kurkur Formation	Egypt		
Orthochetus darraghi	Sp. nov	Valid	Schnetler & Nielsen	Paleocene (Selandian)		Denmark		
Osilinus burgadoi	Sp. nov	Valid	Martín-González in Martín-González et al.	Late Miocene		Spain (Canary Islands)	A species of Osilinus.	
Papposilenus	Gen. et comb. et sp. nov	Valid	DeVries	Early Paleogene to Miocene	Pisco Basin (Caballas Formation)	Colombia; Dominican Republic; Ecuador; Peru; United States (Florida)	A member of the family Potamididae. The type species is "Cerithium" suprasulcatum Gabb (1873); genus also includes "Cerithium" suprasulcatum Gabb (1873), "Potamides" ormei Maury (1917), "Potamides" infraliratus Spieker (1922) and a new species Papposilenus utriculus.	
Papuliscala presselierensis	Sp. nov	Valid	Landau, Ceulemans & Van Dingenen	Miocene (Tortonian)		France	A species of Papuliscala.	
Papuliscala redoniensis	Sp. nov	Valid	Landau, Ceulemans & Van Dingenen	Miocene (Tortonian)		France	A species of Papuliscala.	
Paradrillia pachyspira	Sp. nov	Valid	Harzhauser et al.	Miocene (Tortonian)	Seria Formation	Brunei	A species of Paradrillia.	
Paradrobacia hrvatovici	Sp. nov	Valid	Harzhauser, Mandic & Neubauer in Harzhauser et al.	Miocene (Langhian)		Bosnia and Herzegovina	A member of the family Helicidae.	
Paraseraphs cantamessae	Sp. nov	Valid	Maxwell, Congdon & Rymer	Eocene (Priabonian)	White Limestone Formation	Jamaica	A member of the family Seraphsidae.	
Patella mahamensis	Sp. nov	Valid	Martín-González in Martín-González et al.	Late Miocene		Spain (Canary Islands)	A species of Patella.	
Patella maxoratensis	Sp. nov	Valid	Martín-González & Vera-Peláez in Martín-González et al.	Late Miocene		Spain (Canary Islands)	A species of Patella.	
Patella tintina	Sp. nov	Valid	Martín-González & Vera-Peláez in Martín-González et al.	Late Miocene		Spain (Canary Islands)	A species of Patella.	
Payraudeautia obelixi	Sp. nov	Valid	Landau, Ceulemans & Van Dingenen	Miocene (Tortonian)		France	A species of Payraudeautia.	
Pernericirrus lindstroemi	Sp. nov	Valid	Frýda, Ebbestad & Frýdová	Silurian (Ludfordian)		Sweden	A member of Porcellioidea.	
Phos bruneiensis	Sp. nov	Valid	Harzhauser et al.	Miocene (Tortonian)	Seria Formation	Brunei	A species of Phos.	
Planellavitrina	Gen. et sp. nov	Valid	Margry			Spain (Canary Islands)	A member of the family Vitrinidae. Genus includes new species P. occulta.	
Potamides henryi	Sp. nov	Valid	DeVries	Early Paleogene	Pisco Basin (Caballas Formation)	Peru	A species of Potamides.	
Potamides janeae	Sp. nov	Valid	DeVries	Early Paleogene	Pisco Basin (Caballas Formation)	Peru	A species of Potamides.	
Powellisetia europaea	Sp. nov	Valid	Landau, Ceulemans & Van Dingenen	Miocene (Tortonian)		France	A species of Powellisetia.	
Praealaerato	Gen. et sp. nov	Valid	Fehse	Oligocene (Chattian)		France	A relative of members of the genus Erato. Genus includes new species P. pacaudi.	
Praerosaria besucus	Sp. nov	Valid	Pacaud	Eocene (Bartonian)		France	A member of the family Cypraeidae.	
Praerosaria borysthenis	Sp. nov	Valid	Pacaud	Eocene (Priabonian)		Ukraine	A member of the family Cypraeidae.	
Praerosaria stefanskyii	Sp. nov	Valid	Pacaud	Eocene (Priabonian)		Ukraine	A member of the family Cypraeidae.	
Primovula (Squiresia)	Subgen. nov	Valid	Dolin & Dockery	Eocene (Bartonian)	Cook Mountain Formation	United States (Alabama)	A subgenus of Primovula. The subgenus includes Primovula symmetrica (Aldrich, 1903).	
Projenneria acinonyx	Sp. nov	Valid	Pacaud	Eocene (Priabonian)		Ukraine	A member of the family Ovulidae.	
Projenneria maculata	Sp. nov	Valid	Pacaud	Eocene (Priabonian)		Ukraine	A member of the family Ovulidae.	
Provanna fortis	Sp. nov	Valid	Hybertsen & Kiel	Middle Eocene	Humptulips Formation	United States (Washington)	A species of Provanna.	
Prunum seriaense	Sp. nov	Valid	Harzhauser et al.	Miocene (Tortonian)	Seria Formation	Brunei	A species of Prunum.	
Pseudoklikia	Gen. et comb. nov	Valid	Nordsieck	Early Pleistocene		Austria	A member of the family Helicidae. The type species is "Klikia" altenburgensis Binder (1977).	
Pseudosetia ivolasi	Sp. nov	Valid	Landau, Ceulemans & Van Dingenen	Miocene (Tortonian)		France	A species of Pseudosetia.	
Pseudosetia peyroti	Sp. nov	Valid	Landau, Ceulemans & Van Dingenen	Miocene (Tortonian)		France	A species of Pseudosetia.	
Pseudosetia sergegofasi	Sp. nov	Valid	Landau, Ceulemans & Van Dingenen	Miocene (Tortonian)		France	A species of Pseudosetia.	
Pseudosetia wareni	Sp. nov	Valid	Landau, Ceulemans & Van Dingenen	Miocene (Tortonian)		France	A species of Pseudosetia.	
Pseudosimnia (Vokesina)	Subgen. et sp. nov	Valid	Dolin & Dockery	Eocene (Bartonian)	Cook Mountain Formation	United States (Mississippi)	A subgenus of Pseudosimnia. The subgenus includes new species P. (V.) anteana.	
Pusillina dollfusi	Sp. nov	Valid	Landau, Ceulemans & Van Dingenen	Miocene (Tortonian)		France	A species of Pusillina.	
Pusillina gallica	Sp. nov	Valid	Landau, Ceulemans & Van Dingenen	Miocene (Tortonian)		France	A species of Pusillina.	
Pyropsis jakobseni	Sp. nov	Valid	Schnetler & Nielsen	Paleocene (Selandian)		Denmark		
Pyropsis pacaudi	Sp. nov	Valid	Schnetler & Nielsen	Paleocene (Selandian)		Denmark		
Quadrinervus wienekei	Sp. nov	Valid	Schnetler & Nielsen	Paleocene (Selandian)		Denmark		
Racheliella	Gen. et comb. nov	Valid	Nützel	Late Triassic (Carnian)	San Cassiano Formation	Italy	A member of Mathildoidea; a new genus for "Loxonema" mersai.	
Raphitoma georgesi	Sp. nov	Valid	Ceulemans, Van Dingenen & Landau	Pliocene (Zanclean)		France	A species of Raphitoma.	
Raphitoma landreauensis	Sp. nov	Valid	Ceulemans, Van Dingenen & Landau	Pliocene (Zanclean)		France	A species of Raphitoma.	
Raphitoma palumbina	Sp. nov	Valid	Ceulemans, Van Dingenen & Landau	Pliocene (Zanclean)		France	A species of Raphitoma.	
Raphitoma pseudoconcinna	Sp. nov	Valid	Ceulemans, Van Dingenen & Landau	Pliocene (Zanclean)		France	A species of Raphitoma.	
Raphitoma turtaudierei	Sp. nov	Valid	Ceulemans, Van Dingenen & Landau	Pliocene (Zanclean)		France	A species of Raphitoma.	
Raphitoma vercingetorixi	Sp. nov	Valid	Ceulemans, Van Dingenen & Landau	Pliocene (Zanclean)		France	A species of Raphitoma.	
Rasatomaria multistriata	Sp. nov	Valid	Nützel, Kaim & Grădinaru	Middle Triassic (Anisian)		Romania	A possible member of the family Pleurotomariidae.	
Ravniella lipmanorum	Sp. nov	Valid	Squires in Squires & Lipman	Paleocene	San Francisquito Formation; Santa Susana Formation	United States (California)	A member of the family Acteonidae.	
Rhinoclavis pulcherrima	Sp. nov	Valid	Harzhauser et al.	Miocene (Tortonian)	Seria Formation	Brunei	A species of Rhinoclavis.	
Rhinotamides everriculum	Sp. nov	Valid	DeVries	Early Paleogene	Pisco Basin (Caballas Formation)	Peru	A member of the family Potamididae.	
Rhombopsis longinquus	Sp. nov	Valid	DeVries	Early Paleogene	Pisco Basin (Caballas Formation)	Peru	A member of the family Fasciolariidae.	
Rissoa decorticata	Sp. nov	Valid	Landau, Ceulemans & Van Dingenen	Miocene (Tortonian)		France	A species of Rissoa.	
Rissoa harmeri	Nom. nov	Valid	Faber	Pliocene		United Kingdom	A species of Rissoa; a replacement name for Rissoa ambigua Harmer (1925).	
Rissoa obeliscoides	Nom. nov	Valid	Landau, Ceulemans & Van Dingenen	Miocene (Tortonian)		France	A species of Rissoa; a replacement name for Rissoa notabilis Millet (1865).	
Rissoa torquata	Sp. nov	Valid	Landau, Ceulemans & Van Dingenen	Miocene (Tortonian)		France	A species of Rissoa.	
Rissoina tutongensis	Sp. nov	Valid	Harzhauser et al.	Miocene (Tortonian)	Seria Formation	Brunei	A species of Rissoina.	
Scalptia verheckeni	Sp. nov	Valid	Harzhauser et al.	Miocene (Tortonian)	Seria Formation	Brunei	A species of Scalptia.	
Scurria rieae	Sp. nov	Valid	Schnetler & Nielsen	Paleocene (Selandian)		Denmark	A species of Scurria.	
Seila petasa	Sp. nov	Valid	Landau, Ceulemans & Van Dingenen	Miocene (Tortonian)		France	A species of Seila.	
Semibittium brebioni	Sp. nov	Valid	Landau, Ceulemans & Van Dingenen	Miocene (Tortonian)		France		
Semisulcospira (Biwamelania) kokubuensis	Sp. nov	Valid	Matsuoka & Miura	Pleistocene	Katata Formation	Japan	A species of Semisulcospira.	
Semisulcospira (Biwamelania) nakamurai	Sp. nov	Valid	Matsuoka & Miura	Pleistocene	Katata Formation	Japan	A species of Semisulcospira.	
Semisulcospira (Biwamelania) pseudomultigranosa	Sp. nov	Valid	Matsuoka & Miura	Pleistocene	Katata Formation	Japan	A species of Semisulcospira.	
Semisulcospira (Biwamelania) pusilla	Sp. nov	Valid	Matsuoka & Miura	Pleistocene	Katata Formation	Japan	A species of Semisulcospira.	
Semisulcospira (Biwamelania) spinulifera	Sp. nov	Valid	Matsuoka & Miura	Pleistocene	Katata Formation	Japan	A species of Semisulcospira.	
Siphonalia morteni	Sp. nov	Valid	Schnetler & Nielsen	Paleocene (Selandian)		Denmark	A species of Siphonalia.	
Siphonalia (Pseudoneptunea) semiruta	Sp. nov	Valid	Berezovsky in Berezovsky & Girik	Eocene		Ukraine	A species of Siphonalia.	
Siratus hirmetzli	Sp. nov	Valid	Kovács	Middle Miocene	Sámsonháza Formation	Hungary	A species of Siratus.	
Sisenna inaequistriata	Sp. nov	Valid	Nützel, Kaim & Grădinaru	Middle Triassic (Anisian)		Romania	A member of the family Gosseletinidae.	
Sphaerocypraea camboritus	Sp. nov	Valid	Pacaud	Eocene (Lutetian)		France	A member of the family Ovulidae.	
Sphaerocypraea gallica	Sp. nov	Valid	Pacaud	Eocene (Bartonian)	Paris Basin	France	A member of the family Ovulidae.	
Straparollus obtectus	Sp. nov	Valid	Harper	Carboniferous (Mississippian)	Gilmore City Formation	United States (Iowa)	A member of Euomphaloidea.	
Subepona amitrovi	Sp. nov	Valid	Dolin & Aguerre	Eocene (Bartonian)		France		
Subepona barbei	Sp. nov	Valid	Dolin & Aguerre	Eocene (Bartonian)		France		
Subepona basilica	Sp. nov	Valid	Dolin & Aguerre	Eocene (Bartonian)		France		
Subepona berezovskyi	Sp. nov	Valid	Dolin & Aguerre	Eocene (Bartonian)		France		
Subepona caelatura	Sp. nov	Valid	Dolin & Aguerre	Eocene (Bartonian)		France		
Subepona cattoi	Sp. nov	Valid	Dolin & Aguerre	Eocene (Bartonian)		France		
Subepona cluzaudi	Sp. nov	Valid	Pacaud	Eocene (Bartonian)		France	A member of the family Cypraeidae.	
Subepona dilatata	Sp. nov	Valid	Dolin & Aguerre	Eocene (Bartonian)		France		
Subepona exspectata	Sp. nov	Valid	Dolin & Aguerre	Eocene (Bartonian)		France		
Subepona fusoides	Sp. nov	Valid	Dolin & Aguerre	Eocene (Bartonian)		France		
Subepona gracillima	Sp. nov	Valid	Dolin & Aguerre	Eocene (Bartonian)		France		
Subepona harmonica	Sp. nov	Valid	Dolin & Aguerre	Eocene (Bartonian)		France		
Subepona hungarica	Sp. nov	Valid	Pacaud & Vicián	Eocene (Lutetian)		Hungary	A member of the family Cypraeidae.	
Subepona insolita	Sp. nov	Valid	Dolin & Aguerre	Eocene (Bartonian)		France		
Subepona javelina	Sp. nov	Valid	Dolin & Aguerre	Eocene (Bartonian)		France		
Subepona laminata	Sp. nov	Valid	Dolin & Aguerre	Eocene (Bartonian)		France		
Subepona notabilis	Sp. nov	Valid	Dolin & Aguerre	Eocene (Bartonian)		France		
Subepona orbiculata	Sp. nov	Valid	Dolin & Aguerre	Eocene (Bartonian)		France		
Subepona pacaudi	Sp. nov	Valid	Ledon	Eocene (Bartonian)		France	A member of the family Cypraeidae.	
Subepona rixatoria	Sp. nov	Valid	Dolin & Aguerre	Eocene (Bartonian)		France		
Subepona romaneki	Sp. nov	Valid	Dolin & Aguerre	Eocene (Bartonian)		France		
Subepona scutula	Sp. nov	Valid	Dolin & Aguerre	Eocene (Bartonian)		France		
Subepona trigonella	Sp. nov	Valid	Dolin & Aguerre	Eocene (Bartonian)		France		
Subepona vultuosa	Sp. nov	Valid	Dolin & Aguerre	Eocene (Bartonian)		France		
Taviania checchii	Sp. nov	Valid	Pacaud	Eocene (Priabonian)		Ukraine		
Taviania danaperensis	Sp. nov	Valid	Pacaud	Eocene (Priabonian)		Ukraine		
Taviania ukrainica	Sp. nov	Valid	Pacaud	Eocene (Priabonian)		Ukraine		
Tectarius isletaensis	Sp. nov	Valid	Vera-Peláez in Martín-González et al.	Late Miocene		Spain (Canary Islands)	A species of Tectarius.	
Teinostoma obesum	Sp. nov	Valid	Landau, Ceulemans & Van Dingenen	Miocene (Tortonian)		France	A species of Teinostoma.	
Terebralia marki	Sp. nov	Valid	DeVries	Early Paleogene	Pisco Basin (Caballas Formation)	Peru	A species of Terebralia.	
Terebralia pauli	Sp. nov	Valid	DeVries	Early Paleogene	Pisco Basin (Caballas Formation)	Peru	A species of Terebralia.	
Theodoxus susuzianus	Sp. nov	Valid	Harzhauser, Neubauer & Hoşgör	Late Oligocene or early Miocene	Susuz Formation	Turkey	A species of Theodoxus.	
Timbellus danapris	Sp. nov	Valid	Pacaud	Eocene (Priabonian)		Ukraine	A species of Timbellus.	
Timbellus priabonicus	Nom. nov	Valid	Pacaud	Eocene (Priabonian)		Germany	A species of Timbellus; a replacement name for Murex trialatus von Koenen (1889).	
Tomopleura furcata	Sp. nov	Valid	Harzhauser et al.	Miocene (Tortonian)	Seria Formation	Brunei	A species of Tomopleura.	
Tornus superlatus	Sp. nov	Valid	Landau, Ceulemans & Van Dingenen	Miocene (Tortonian)		France	A species of Tornus.	
Trachytriton eliseae	Sp. nov	Valid	Schnetler & Nielsen	Paleocene (Selandian)		Denmark		
Tragula saccoi	Sp. nov	Valid	Bongiardino & Micali	Pliocene		Italy	A species of Tragula.	
Triphora buscheri	Sp. nov	Valid	Landau, Ceulemans & Van Dingenen	Miocene (Tortonian)		France	A species of Triphora.	
Triphora chauvereauensis	Sp. nov	Valid	Landau, Ceulemans & Van Dingenen	Miocene (Tortonian)		France	A species of Triphora.	
Triphora fernandezgarcesi	Sp. nov	Valid	Landau, Ceulemans & Van Dingenen	Miocene (Tortonian)		France	A species of Triphora.	
Triphora lherbettorum	Sp. nov	Valid	Landau, Ceulemans & Van Dingenen	Miocene (Tortonian)		France	A species of Triphora.	
Triphora miopygmaea	Sp. nov	Valid	Landau, Ceulemans & Van Dingenen	Miocene (Tortonian)		France	A species of Triphora.	
Triphora sancticlementensis	Sp. nov	Valid	Landau, Ceulemans & Van Dingenen	Miocene (Tortonian)		France	A species of Triphora.	
Triplostephanus wilfordi	Sp. nov	Valid	Harzhauser et al.	Miocene (Tortonian)	Seria Formation	Brunei	A species of Triplostephanus.	
Tristeirostoma	Gen. et sp. nov	Valid	DeVries	Early Paleogene	Pisco Basin (Caballas Formation)	Peru	A member of Pyramidelloidea of uncertain phylogenetic placement. The type species is T. saxaquadrata.	
Trivia sceauxensis	Sp. nov	Valid	Landau, Ceulemans & Van Dingenen	Miocene (Tortonian)		France	A species of Trivia.	
Triviella angushawkei	Sp. nov	Valid	Fehse & Grego	Eocene		Australia	A species of Triviella.	
Triviella korneli	Sp. nov	Valid	Fehse & Grego	Eocene		Australia	A species of Triviella.	
Truncaria benjamini	Sp. nov	Valid	Schnetler & Nielsen	Paleocene (Selandian)		Denmark		
Tryonia globosa	Sp. nov	Valid	Guimarães, Ramos & de Simone	Miocene–Pliocene	Solimões Formation	Brazil	A species of Tryonia.	
Turbonilla tabanellii	Sp. nov	Valid	Bongiardino & Micali	Pliocene		Italy	A species of Turbonilla.	
Turricula vibekeae	Sp. nov	Valid	Schnetler & Nielsen	Paleocene (Selandian)		Denmark	A species of Turricula.	
Turritella amitava	Sp. nov	Valid	Das et al.	Uncertain; Late Jurassic or Miocene	Chari Formation	India	A species of Turritella.	
Turritella capistrata	Sp. nov	Valid	DeVries	Early Paleogene	Pisco Basin (Caballas Formation)	Peru	A species of Turritella.	
Turritella dhosaensis	Sp. nov	Valid	Das et al.	Uncertain; Late Jurassic or Miocene	Chari Formation	India	A species of Turritella.	
Unedogemmula nuttalli	Sp. nov	Valid	Harzhauser et al.	Miocene (Tortonian)	Seria Formation	Brunei	A species of Unedogemmula.	
Valvata koehleri	Sp. nov	Valid	Harzhauser, Neubauer & Hoşgör	Late Oligocene or early Miocene	Susuz Formation	Turkey	A species of Valvata.	
Valvata mathiasi	Sp. nov	Valid	Esu & Girotti	Early Pliocene		Italy	A species of Valvata.	
Vertigo antipygmaea	Sp. nov	Valid	Harzhauser & Neubauer	Miocene		Poland	A species of Vertigo.	
Vitrea angustaeumbilicata	Sp. nov	Valid	Harzhauser & Neubauer	Miocene		Poland	A species of Vitrea.	
Willungia felix	Sp. nov	Valid	Fehse	Early Miocene		Australia	A member of Cypraeoidea.	
Wollastonia beckmanni	Sp. nov	Valid	De Mattia & Groh in De Mattia, Neiber & Groh	Quaternary		Portugal (Madeira)	A member of Helicoidea belonging to the family Geomitridae.	
Wollastonia falknerorum	Sp. nov	Valid	Groh, Neiber & De Mattia in De Mattia, Neiber & Groh	Quaternary		Portugal (Madeira)	A member of Helicoidea belonging to the family Geomitridae.	
Wollastonia inexpectata	Sp. nov	Valid	De Mattia & Groh in De Mattia, Neiber & Groh	Quaternary		Portugal (Madeira)	A member of Helicoidea belonging to the family Geomitridae.	
Wollastonia ripkeni	Sp. nov	Valid	De Mattia & Groh in De Mattia, Neiber & Groh	Quaternary		Portugal (Madeira)	A member of Helicoidea belonging to the family Geomitridae.	
Worthenia (Humiliworthenia) anisica	Sp. nov	Valid	Nützel, Kaim & Grădinaru	Middle Triassic (Anisian)		Romania		
Worthenia (Humiliworthenia) microstriata	Sp. nov	Valid	Nützel, Kaim & Grădinaru	Middle Triassic (Anisian)		Romania	A member of Pleurotomariida belonging to the superfamily Pleurotomarioidea and possibly to the family Wortheniellidae. Originally described as a species of Worthenia; Monari & Dellantonio (2024) transferred it to the genus Dimorphotomaria.	
Worthenia (Worthenia) dobrogeana	Sp. nov	Valid	Nützel, Kaim & Grădinaru	Middle Triassic (Anisian)		Romania		
Xanthodaphne pederzanii	Sp. nov	Valid	Tabanelli & Bongiardino	Pliocene-Pleistocene		Italy	A species of Xanthodaphne.	
Ziba waltercernohorskyi	Sp. nov	Valid	Harzhauser et al.	Miocene (Tortonian)	Seria Formation	Brunei	A species of Ziba.	

== Other molluscs ==
=== Research ===
- A study on patterns of subtle morphological variation in two assemblages of the Cambrian helcionelloid Mackinnonia rostrata from the Shackleton Limestone of Antarctica and Ajax Limestone of South Australia, and an assemblage of M. taconica from the Bastion Formation of Greenland, is published by Jackson & Claybourn (2018).
- The oldest known evidence of trematode parasitism of bivalves in the form of igloo-shaped traces found on shells of the freshwater bivalve Sphaerium is reported from the Upper Cretaceous Judith River Formation (Montana, United States) by Rogers et al. (2018).
- A study evaluating the association of past climate changes with extinction in Cenozoic marine bivalves is published by Edie et al. (2018).
- The oldest known shipworms reported so far, preserved with silicified soft parts, are described from the mid-Cretaceous logs of the Envigne Valley (France) by Robin et al. (2018).
- A study on the taphonomy and paleoecology of oyster mass occurrences from the Cretaceous (Hauterivian) Neuquén Basin (west-central Argentina), dominated by the gryphaeid small oyster Ceratostreon, is published by Toscano, Lazo & Luci (2018).
- Evidence of exceptional preservation in the nacre and prismatic layers of a 66-million-years-old bivalve shell (of a member of the genus Pinna from the Owl Creek Formation, Mississippi, United States) is presented by Myers et al. (2018).
- A study on the allometric growth of shells of the Cenozoic burrowing bivalves Claibornicardia paleopatagonica and Crassatella kokeni from Argentina is published by Perez & Santelli (2018).
- Macrobioerosion of silicate siltstone rocks caused by extant rock-boring mussels is reported from a freshwater section of the Kaladan River (Myanmar) by Bolotov et al. (2018), who note the similarity of recent Kaladan borings to borings assigned to the ichnotaxon Gastrochaenolites anauchen from the Carboniferous deposits of the United States, and interpret their discovery as indicating that rocks with macroborings and fossilized members of rock-boring communities are not necessarily a direct indicator of shallow marine paleo-environments, but may also reflect freshwater habitats.
- A study comparing declines in taxonomic and functional diversity in marine bivalves during the Permian–Triassic extinction event, Cretaceous–Paleogene extinction event and in present times is published by Edie, Jablonski & Valentine (2018).

=== New taxa ===
Name	Novelty	Status	Authors	Age	Unit	Location	Notes	Images
Abra rossii	Nom. nov	Valid	Bonci, Dabove & Piazza	Oligocene	Molare Formation	Italy	A bivalve belonging to the family Semelidae, a species of Abra; a replacement name for Syndesmya intermedia Rovereto (1898).	
Acanthochitona andegavensis	Sp. nov	Valid	Dell'Angelo et al.	Miocene (Tortonian)		France	A chiton; a species of Acanthochitona.	
Acanthochitona chauvereauensis	Sp. nov	Valid	Dell'Angelo et al.	Miocene (Tortonian)		France	A chiton; a species of Acanthochitona.	
Acanthochitona globosa	Sp. nov	Valid	Dell'Angelo et al.	Miocene (Tortonian)		France	A chiton; a species of Acanthochitona.	
Acutostrea gaviota	Sp. nov	Valid	Squires	Late Eocene	Alegria Formation; Gaviota Formation; Wheatland Formation	United States (California)	A true oyster.	
Adacna yaninae	Sp. nov	Valid	Büyükmeriç & Wesselingh	Late Pleistocene		Turkey	A cockle.	
Akardita	Gen. et comb. et sp. nov	Valid	La Perna, Brunetti & Della Bella	Pliocene to recent		Italy; Spain; West Africa	A bivalve belonging to the family Carditidae. The type species is the Pliocene species "Cardita" subrevoluta de Stefani (1888) from Italy; genus also includes new species Akardita iberica from the Pliocene of Spain, as well as extant species Cardita (Venericardia) monodi Nicklès (1953) from West Africa.	
Aksumya	Gen. et sp. nov	Valid	Kiel	Late Triassic (late Carnian, possibly also Norian)		Turkey; United States?	A bivalve belonging to the group Anomalodesmata and the superfamily Pholadomyoidea. The type species is A. krystyni.	
"Anodontia" mioinflata	Sp. nov	Valid	Kiel, Sami & Taviani	Late Miocene		Italy	A bivalve belonging to the family Lucinidae; a species of Anodontia sensu lato.	
Astarte (Astarte) paleocenica	Sp. nov	Valid	Amano & Jenkins in Amano, Jenkins & Kurita	Paleocene	Katsuhira Formation	Japan	A species of Astarte.	
?Atrina rosenkrantzi	Sp. nov	Valid	Schnetler & Nielsen	Paleocene (Selandian)		Denmark	Possibly a species of Atrina.	
Callochiton pouweri	Sp. nov	Valid	Dell'Angelo et al.	Miocene (Tortonian)		France	A chiton, a species of Callochiton.	
Cardilia edwardsi	Sp. nov	Valid	Signorelli & Raven	Eocene (Bartonian)	Becton Formation	United Kingdom	A bivalve belonging to the family Cardiliidae.	
Carolinapecten corpulentus	Sp. nov	Valid	Waller	Late Miocene	Peace River Formation	United States (Florida)	A scallop.	
Carolinapecten murdockensis	Sp. et 3 subsp. nov	Valid	Waller	Late Miocene	Peace River Formation	United States (Florida)	A scallop. This species includes new subspecies C. murdockensis druidwilsoni, C. murdockensis murdockensis and C. murdockensis parawatsonensis.	
Caspiconcha basquensis	Sp. nov	Valid	Jenkins et al.	Early Cretaceous (late Albian)		Spain	A kalenterid bivalve.	
Caspiconcha lastsamurai	Sp. nov	Valid	Jenkins et al.	Late Cretaceous (Campanian)		Japan	A kalenterid bivalve.	
Caspiconcha raukumaraensis	Sp. nov	Valid	Jenkins et al.	Cretaceous (late Albian to mid-Cenomanian)		New Zealand	A kalenterid bivalve.	
Caspiconcha yubariensis	Sp. nov	Valid	Jenkins et al.	Early Cretaceous (late Albian)		Japan	A kalenterid bivalve.	
Chesapecten madisonius sarasotensis	Subsp. nov	Valid	Waller	Pliocene		United States (Florida)	A scallop.	
Chesapecten middlesexensis bayshorensis	Subsp. nov	Valid	Waller	Late Miocene	Peace River Formation	United States (Florida)	A scallop.	
Chesapecten middlesexensis hunterae	Subsp. nov	Valid	Waller	Late Miocene	Peace River Formation	United States (Florida)	A scallop.	
Chesapecten quinarius	Sp. nov	Valid	Waller	Pliocene		United States (Florida)	A scallop.	
Chokekenia	Gen. et comb. nov	Valid	Santelli & del Río	Early Miocene		Argentina	A scallop. The type species is "Zygochlamys" nicolasi Morra (1985).	
Connexochiton vivesi	Sp. nov	Valid	Dell'Angelo et al.			France	A chiton.	
Crassatella affinis	Sp. nov	Valid	Berezovsky	Late Eocene		Ukraine	A bivalve belonging to the family Crassatellidae.	
Crassatella ballista	Sp. nov	Valid	Berezovsky	Middle Eocene		Ukraine	A bivalve belonging to the family Crassatellidae.	
Crassatella calva	Sp. nov	Valid	Berezovsky	Middle Eocene		Ukraine	A bivalve belonging to the family Crassatellidae.	
Crassatella ignara	Sp. nov	Valid	Berezovsky	Late Eocene	Mandrikovka Beds	Ukraine	A bivalve belonging to the family Crassatellidae.	
Crassatella laboriosa	Sp. nov	Valid	Berezovsky	Late Eocene		Ukraine	A bivalve belonging to the family Crassatellidae.	
Crassatella necopina	Sp. nov	Valid	Berezovsky	Late Eocene	Mandrikovka Beds	Ukraine	A bivalve belonging to the family Crassatellidae.	
Crassatella personata	Sp. nov	Valid	Berezovsky	Late Eocene	Mandrikovka Beds	Ukraine	A bivalve belonging to the family Crassatellidae.	
Crassatella singulata	Sp. nov	Valid	Berezovsky	Late Eocene	Mandrikovka Beds	Ukraine	A bivalve belonging to the family Crassatellidae. Berezovsky (2018) subsequently made it the type species of a new subgenus Crassatella (Furvusa).	
Crassatina conquisita	Sp. nov	Valid	Berezovsky	Late Eocene	Mandrikovka Beds	Ukraine	A bivalve.	
Crassatina insolita	Sp. nov	Valid	Berezovsky	Late Eocene	Mandrikovka Beds	Ukraine	A bivalve. Transferred to the genus Chattonia by Berezovsky (2018).	
Crassatina obscura	Sp. nov	Valid	Berezovsky	Late Eocene		Ukraine	A bivalve belonging to the family Crassatellidae.	
Crassatina subcostata	Sp. nov	Valid	Berezovsky	Middle Eocene		Ukraine	A bivalve.	
Crassostrea tectonica	Sp. nov	Valid	Squires	Middle Eocene	Coldwater Formation; Domengine Formation; Matilija Sandstone; Santiago Formation	United States (California)	A true oyster, a species of Crassostrea.	
Crassovella	Gen. et comb. et 2 sp. nov	Valid	Berezovsky	Late Eocene		Germany; Poland; Ukraine	A bivalve belonging to the family Crassatellidae. The type species is "Crassatella" raricostata Klushnikov (1958); genus also includes "Crassatella" woodi Koenen (1865), as well as new species C. depulsor and C. faber.	
Cubitostrea californiana	Sp. nov	Valid	Squires	Late early Eocene	Ardath Shale; Llajas Formation	United States (California)	A true oyster.	
Cuspidaria anderseni	Sp. nov	Valid	Schnetler & Nielsen	Paleocene (Selandian)		Denmark	A species of Cuspidaria.	
Cuspidaria heilmannclauseni	Sp. nov	Valid	Schnetler & Nielsen	Paleocene (Selandian)		Denmark	A species of Cuspidaria.	
Cyrtokolymia bobini	Sp. nov	Valid	Biakov	Middle Permian		Russia	An Inoceramus-like bivalve belonging to the family Kolymiidae.	
Debrunia acuta	Sp. nov	Valid	Masse & Fenerci-Masse	Early Cretaceous (Hauterivian)		France	A rudist bivalve belonging to the family Monopleuridae.	
Debrunia elongata	Sp. nov	Valid	Masse & Fenerci-Masse	Early Cretaceous (Aptian, possibly Albian)	Serdj Formation	Algeria; Bosnia and Herzegovina; Italy; Spain; Tunisia; Turkey?	A rudist bivalve belonging to the family Monopleuridae.	
Debrunia heliomorpha	Sp. nov	Valid	Masse & Fenerci-Masse	Early Cretaceous (Hauterivian)		France	A rudist bivalve belonging to the family Monopleuridae.	
Debrunia massiliana	Sp. nov	Valid	Masse & Fenerci-Masse	Early Cretaceous (Valanginian)		France	A rudist bivalve belonging to the family Monopleuridae.	
Debrunia tunesiana	Sp. nov	Valid	Masse & Fenerci-Masse	Early Cretaceous (Hauterivian)	Bou Hedma Formation	Tunisia	A rudist bivalve belonging to the family Monopleuridae.	
Debrunia ucetiae	Sp. nov	Valid	Masse & Fenerci-Masse	Early Cretaceous (Barremian and Aptian)		France	A rudist bivalve belonging to the family Monopleuridae.	
Elliptiolucina neozelandica	Sp. nov	Valid	Amano, Little & Campbell	Miocene	Bexhaven Limestone	New Zealand	A bivalve belonging to the family Lucinidae.	
Eucrassatella depulsoris	Sp. nov	Valid	Berezovsky	Middle Eocene		Ukraine	A bivalve belonging to the family Crassatellidae.	
Hanleya sancticlementensis	Sp. nov	Valid	Dell'Angelo et al.	Miocene (Tortonian)		France	A chiton.	
Hanleya sossoi	Sp. nov	Valid	Dell'Angelo et al.	Miocene (Tortonian)		France	A chiton.	
Hebecardium lapideus	Sp. nov	Valid	Berezovsky	Eocene		Ukraine	A cockle.	
Incanopsis fastigiata	Sp. nov	Valid	DeVries	Early Paleogene	Pisco Basin (Caballas Formation)	Peru	A bivalve belonging to the family Noetiidae.	
Incatina	Gen. et sp. nov	Valid	DeVries	Early Eocene	Pisco Basin (Caballas Formation)	Peru	A bivalve belonging to the family Crassatellidae. The type species is I. collinsae.	
Ischnochiton nitidum	Sp. nov	Valid	Dell'Angelo et al.	Miocene (Tortonian)		France	A chiton, a species of Ischnochiton.	
Ischnochiton renardi	Sp. nov	Valid	Dell'Angelo et al.			France	A chiton, a species of Ischnochiton.	
Kasimlara	Gen. et sp. nov	Valid	Kiel	Late Triassic (late Carnian)		Turkey	A bivalve belonging to the group Carditida and the family Kalenteridae. The type species is K. kosuni.	
Kolymia peregoedovi	Sp. nov	Valid	Biakov & Kutygin	Middle Permian		Russia (Sakha Republic)	A bivalve.	
Kolymia pontoneica	Sp. nov	Valid	Biakov	Middle Permian		Russia	An Inoceramus-like bivalve belonging to the family Kolymiidae.	
Kolymia posneri	Sp. nov	Valid	Muromzeva, Kusnezov & Biakov in Biakov et al.	Middle Permian	Delezhinskaya Formation	Russia	An Inoceramus-like bivalve belonging to the family Kolymiidae.	
Kolymia simkiniformis	Sp. nov	Valid	Biakov	Middle Permian		Russia	An Inoceramus-like bivalve belonging to the family Kolymiidae.	
Leptochiton aturriensis	Sp. nov	Valid	Dell'Angelo et al.			France	A chiton, a species of Leptochiton.	
Leptochiton lateropustulosus	Sp. nov	Valid	Dell'Angelo et al.	Miocene (Tortonian)		France	A chiton, a species of Leptochiton.	
Leptochiton parvus	Sp. nov	Valid	Dell'Angelo et al.	Miocene (Tortonian)		France	A chiton, a species of Leptochiton.	
Leptochiton renauleauensis	Sp. nov	Valid	Dell'Angelo et al.	Miocene (Tortonian)		France	A chiton, a species of Leptochiton.	
Leptochiton terryiverseni	Sp. nov	Valid	Hybertsen & Kiel	Middle Eocene	Humptulips Formation	United States (Washington)	A chiton, a species of Leptochiton.	
Lepidopleurus gallicus	Sp. nov	Valid	Dell'Angelo et al.	Miocene (Tortonian)		France	A chiton, a species of Lepidopleurus.	
Lepidopleurus pseudobenoisti	Sp. nov	Valid	Dell'Angelo et al.	Miocene (Tortonian)		France	A chiton, a species of Lepidopleurus.	
Lucilina saubadeae	Sp. nov	Valid	Dell'Angelo et al.			France	A chiton, a species of Lucilina.	
Lucinoma saetheri	Sp. nov	Valid	Amano, Little & Campbell	Miocene	Bexhaven Limestone; Ihungia Limestone	New Zealand	A bivalve belonging to the family Lucinidae.	
Mactra (Sarmatymactra) belokrysia	Sp. nov	Valid	Berezovsky in Berezovsky & Systerova	Miocene		Ukraine	A bivalve, a species of Mactra.	
Meekopecten	Gen. et comb. nov	Valid	Waterhouse	Carboniferous	Stanton Formation	Canada (Yukon); United States (Kansas)	A bivalve belonging to the group Pectinida. The type species is "Acanthopecten" meeki Newel (1938).	
Meganodontia haunuiensis	Sp. nov	Valid	Amano, Little & Campbell	Miocene	Ihungia Limestone	New Zealand	A bivalve belonging to the family Lucinidae.	
Megaxinus stironensis	Sp. nov	Valid	Kiel & Taviani	Pliocene	Lugagnano Formation	Italy	A bivalve belonging to the family Lucinidae.	
Modiolus mortenseni	Sp. nov	Valid	Schnetler & Nielsen	Paleocene (Selandian)		Denmark	A species of Modiolus.	
Moirechlamys	Gen. et comb. nov	Valid	Santelli & del Río	Late Miocene–early Pliocene		Argentina	A scallop. The type species is "Pecten" actinodes Sowerby (1846); genus also includes "Chlamys" aurorae Feruglio (1954).	
Monodacna pseudocolorata	Sp. nov	Valid	Büyükmeriç & Wesselingh	Late Pleistocene		Turkey	A cockle.	
Mulinoides plenicostatus	Sp. nov	Valid	DeVries	Early Paleogene	Pisco Basin (Caballas Formation)	Peru	A bivalve belonging to the family Mactridae.	
Neuquemya	Gen. et sp. nov	Valid	Damborenea	Early Jurassic (Pliensbachian)		Argentina	A bivalve, possibly belonging to the family Cuspidariidae. Genus includes new species N. leanzaorum.	
Nuculana acutilineata	Sp. nov	Valid	Hybertsen & Kiel	Middle Eocene	Humptulips Formation	United States (Washington)	A bivalve.	
Oryxia	Gen. et sp. nov	Valid	Rineau & Villier	Late Cretaceous (Cenomanian)		Slovenia	A rudist bivalve. Genus includes new species O. sulcata.	
Parachiton palmorum	Sp. nov	Valid	Dell'Angelo et al.			France	A chiton, a species of Parachiton.	
Permianaia	Gen. et sp. nov	Valid	Silantiev, Urazaeva & Golubev	Late Permian		Russia (Vladimir Oblast)	A bivalve belonging to the family Naiaditidae. Genus includes new species P. gusevi.	
Phygraea badgeri	Sp. nov	Valid	Squires	Late middle Eocene to early late Eocene	Coldwater Formation; Lower Gaviota Formation	United States (California)	A foam oyster.	
Pixiechlamys	Gen. et comb. nov	Valid	Santelli & del Río	Early Miocene		Argentina	A scallop. The type species is "Pecten" quemadensis Ihering (1897).	
Pleuriocardia (Incacardium) schneideri	Sp. nov	Valid	DeVries	Early Paleogene	Pisco Basin (Caballas Formation)	Peru	A cockle.	
Poromya katsuhiraensis	Sp. nov	Valid	Amano & Jenkins in Amano, Jenkins & Kurita	Paleocene	Katsuhira Formation	Japan	A bivalve.	
Pteria thomseni	Sp. nov	Valid	Schnetler & Nielsen	Paleocene (Selandian)		Denmark	A species of Pteria.	
Pulvinites elenae	Sp. nov	Valid	Jagt	Late Cretaceous (Maastrichtian)		Netherlands	A bivalve belonging to the family Pulvinitidae.	
Pycnogryphaea	Gen. et comb. nov	Valid	Kosenko	Early Cretaceous (Berriasian)		Crimean Peninsula	A bivalve belonging to the family Gryphaeidae and the subfamily Pycnodonteinae. The type species is "Gryphaea" weberae Yanin in Tschelzova (1969).	
Rhyssoplax assurrectum	Sp. nov	Valid	Dell'Angelo et al.	Miocene (Tortonian)		France	A chiton, a species of Rhyssoplax.	
Schizochiton tasteti	Sp. nov	Valid	Dell'Angelo et al.			France	A chiton, a species of Schizochiton.	
Terzileria	Gen. et sp. nov	Valid	Kiel	Late Triassic (late Carnian, possibly also Norian)		Turkey; United States?	A bivalve belonging to the group Carditida and the family Kalenteridae. The type species is T. gregaria.	
Thyasira (Thyasira) oliveri	Sp. nov	Valid	Amano & Jenkins in Amano, Jenkins & Kurita	Paleocene	Katsuhira Formation	Japan	A species of Thyasira.	
Tonicella redoniensis	Sp. nov	Valid	Dell'Angelo et al.	Miocene (Tortonian)		France	A chiton, a species of Tonicella.	
