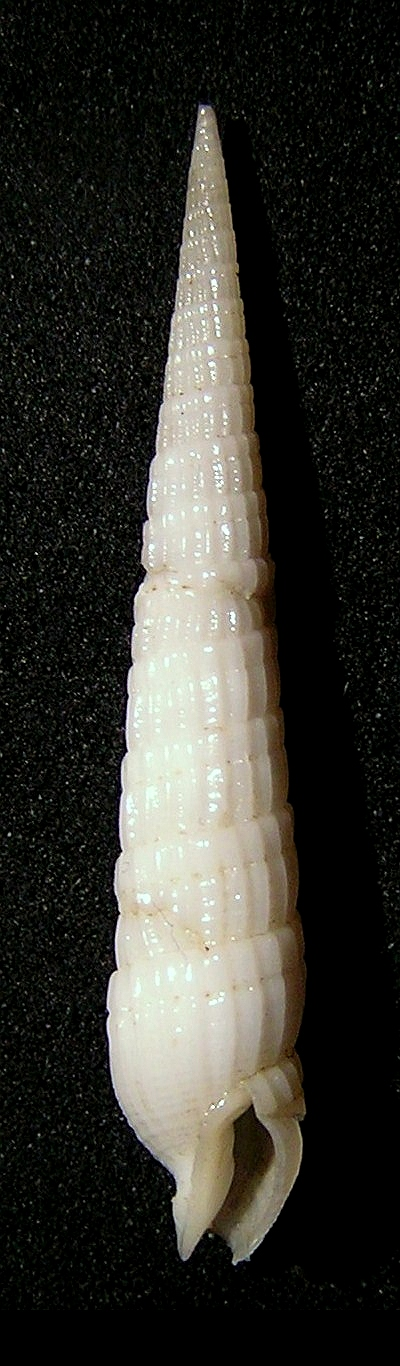
- Apertural view of a shell of Terebra elliscrossi

Scientific classification
- Kingdom: Animalia
- Phylum: Mollusca
- Class: Gastropoda
- Subclass: Caenogastropoda
- Order: Neogastropoda
- Superfamily: Conoidea
- Family: Terebridae
- Genus: Triplostephanus; Dall, 1908

Type species
- Terebra triseriata Gray, 1834

Synonyms
- Terebra (Triplostephanus) Dall, 1908

= Triplostephanus =

Genus of gastropods

Triplostephanus is a genus of sea snails, marine gastropod mollusks in the family Terebridae, the auger snails.

== Species ==
Species within the genus Triplostephanus include:

- † Triplostephanus wilfordi Harzhauser, Raven & Landau, 2018

Species brought into synonymy

- Triplostephanus elliscrossi (Bratcher, 1979): synonym of Terebra elliscrossi Bratcher, 1979
- Triplostephanus fenestratus (Hinds, 1844): synonym of Terebra fenestrata Hinds, 1844
- Triplostephanus guineensis (Bouchet, 1983): synonym of Terebra guineensis Bouchet, 1983
- Triplostephanus hoaraui (Drivas & Jay, 1988): synonym of Terebra hoaraui (Drivas & Jay, 1988)
- Triplostephanus lima (Deshayes, 1857): synonym of Cinguloterebra lima (Deshayes, 1857)
- Triplostephanus triseriatus (Gray, 1834): synonym of Terebra triseriata Gray, 1834
- Triplostephanus waikikiensis (Pilsbry, 1921): synonym of Terebra waikikiensis Pilsbry, 1921
