= Mcleaniella danae =

Scientific classification
- Kingdom: Animalia
- Phylum: Mollusca
- Class: Gastropoda
- Subclass: Vetigastropoda
- Order: Trochida
- Superfamily: Trochoidea
- Family: Liotiidae
- Genus: †Mcleaniella
- Species: †M. danae

Binomial name
- †Mcleaniella danae (d'Orbigny, 1850)

Synonyms
- Solarium danae d'Orbigny, 1850

Extinct species of gastropod

Mcleaniella danae is an extinct species of sea snail, a marine gastropod mollusk, in the family Liotiidae.
