= Coelostylinidae =

Scientific classification
- Kingdom: Animalia
- Phylum: Mollusca
- Class: Gastropoda
- Subclass: Caenogastropoda
- Order: incertae sedis
- Family: †Coelostylinidae; Cossmann, 1908

Extinct family of gastropods

Coelostylinidae is an extinct family of fossil sea snails, marine gastropod molluscs in the clade Caenogastropoda.

According to taxonomy of the Gastropoda by Bouchet & Rocroi (2005) the family Coelostylinidae has no subfamilies. It is unassigned to superfamily.
