= Alvania redoniana =

Scientific classification
- Kingdom: Animalia
- Phylum: Mollusca
- Class: Gastropoda
- Subclass: Caenogastropoda
- Order: Littorinimorpha
- Superfamily: Rissooidea
- Family: Rissoidae
- Genus: Alvania
- Species: †A. redoniana

Binomial name
- †Alvania redoniana Landau, Ceulemans & Van Dingenen, 2018

Species of gastropod

Alvania redoniana is an extinct species of minute sea snail, a marine gastropod mollusc or micromollusk in the family Rissoidae.

== Distribution ==
Fossils of this marine species were found in upper Miocene strata in Maine-et-Loire, France.
