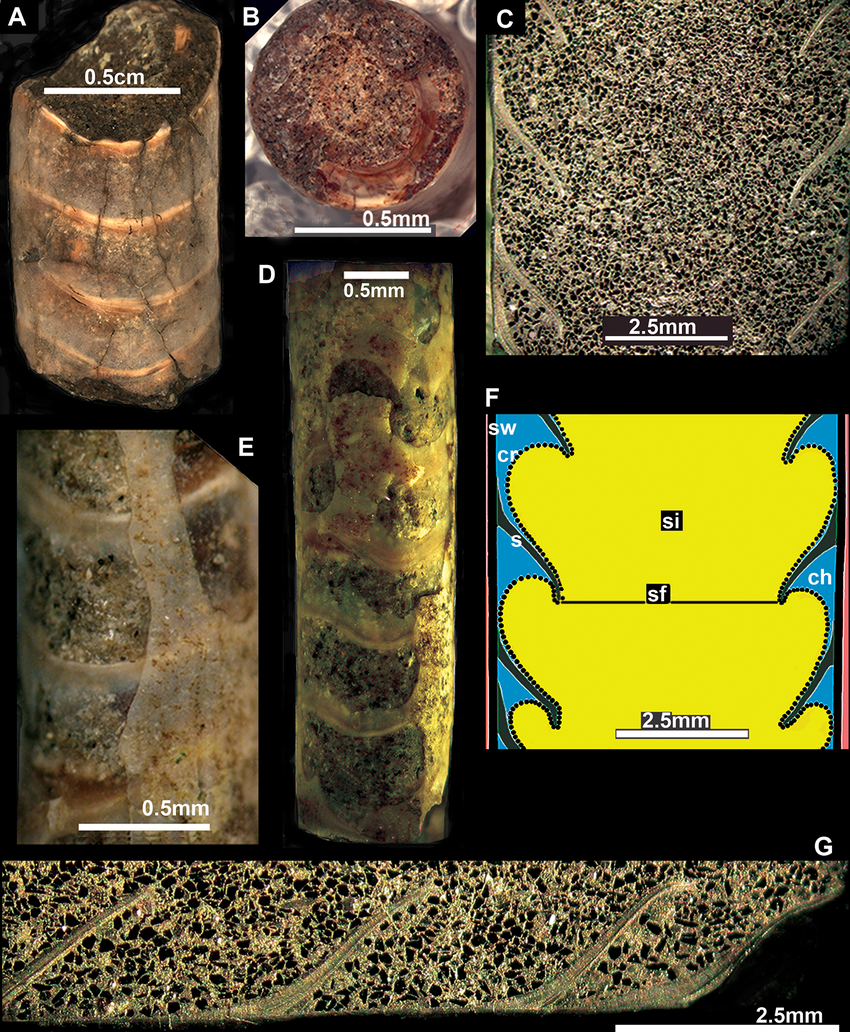
- Shell morphology of Antarcticeras nordenskjoeldi

Scientific classification
- Kingdom: Animalia
- Phylum: Mollusca
- Class: Cephalopoda
- Order: incertae sedis
- Genus: †Antarcticeras; Doguzhaeva, Bengtson, Reguero and Mörs, 2017
- Species: †A. nordenskjoeldi

Binomial name
- †Antarcticeras nordenskjoeldi Doguzhaeva, Bengtson, Reguero and Mörs, 2017

= Antarcticeras =

Antarcticeras Temporal range: Early Eocene

Extinct genus of enigmatic cephalopod

Antarcticeras is an extinct genus of enigmatic cephalopod from the Eocene of Antarctica. It contains a single species, A. nordenskjoeldi. It is either considered the last of the "orthocone"-type cephalopods, the only member of its subclass Paracoleoidea & a descendant of the orthoceratids, and a remarkable example of convergent evolution with coleoid cephalopods, or an oegospid squid and a transitional form in the development of the modern squid gladius, of which it is the only preserved example.

It is named after Swedish geologist and Antarctic explorer Otto Nordenskjöld.

== Discovery ==
Antarcticeras is represented by two fossil shell fragments from the Early Eocene La Meseta Formation from Seymour Island, Antarctica. These are straight shells that closely resemble those of the orthocones, although they are thought to have been internal akin to those of certain coleoids such as the cuttlebone of cuttlefish and the "rams horn" shell of spirulids. The shells are weakly mineralized with the presence of soft tissues and were likely only preserved due to a unique depositional environment. Sympatric cephalopod taxa include the coiled nautiloid Euciphoceras.

== Taxonomy ==
Antarcticeras was described in 2017 by Doguzhaeva et al., who recovered it as the only member of a ghost lineage of cephalopods that had diverged from all others during the Paleozoic. Its coleoid-esque internal shell was recovered as an instance of convergent evolution with coleoids. The coleoids are thought to have originated within the Bactritida during the Late Paleozoic and share similar anatomical features with one another, but Antarcticeras was found to differ from both groups, with its siphuncle placement more closely resembling that of the Actinocerida and especially the Orthocerida, which were recovered as its potential ancestors. For this reason, it was classified within the new subclass Paracoleoidea, order Antarcticerida, and family Antarcticeratidae. This taxonomic placement would suggest the existence of an extremely ancient, previously unknown cephalopod lineage that had survived through several mass extinction events well into the early Cenozoic in the far southern latitudes, and the survival of orthocerid descendants into the Cenozoic. Later that year, The Guardian ranked Antarcticeras as one of the top fossil discoveries of 2017.

In 2018, Fuchs et al published a study refuting the previous classification of Antarcticeras as a new subclass of cephalopods. The poorly mineralized phragmocone was recovered as a transitional form between the mineralized, functional phragomocones seen in certain coleoids and the fully demineralized gladius seen in oegopsid squid. For this reason, Antarcticeras was proposed as the first instance of a fossilized squid shell, which would also indicate that squid gladii had developed remarkably late in the evolutionary history of cephalopods. The late development of the modern squid gladius was also found to support previous hypotheses of a Late Cretaceous origin for most extant decapodiform groups and a Cenozoic origin for modern squid, contrasting with other studies that had placed these divergences during the Paleozoic. It was also not ruled out that Antarcticeras may represent a fossil reworked from older geologic layers.

Later in 2018, Doguzhaeva published a rebuttal to Fuchs et al, noting the presence of siphuncles and septa in Antarcticeras and the lack of these traits in modern oegopsids, and found the shell morphology of Antarcticeras to be unique among cephalopods, concluding that it was impossible of Antarcticeras to be a squid. The potential for Antarcticeras to be a reworked specimen was found to be unlikely due the lack of reworked material in the formation and the two specimens being found at different levels, although not impossible as fossil orthocones are known from Paleozoic formations in other parts of the Antarctic Peninsula; however, reworking would not refute the idea of Antarcticeras forming a unique cephalopod lineage. In addition, a Late Devonian orthocone from Timan Ridge in Russia was found to closely resemble Antarcticeras in siphuncle placement, and was thus cited as a potential Paleozoic representative of the Paracoleoidea.
