= Callotrochus =

Scientific classification
- Kingdom: Animalia
- Phylum: Mollusca
- Class: Gastropoda
- Subclass: Vetigastropoda
- Order: Trochida
- Superfamily: Trochoidea
- Family: Calliostomatidae
- Subfamily: †Callotrochinae
- Genus: †Callotrochus; Kutassy, 1938

Synonyms
- Mesotrochus Kutassy, 1927

Extinct genus of gastropods

Callotrochus is an extinct genus of sea snails in the family Calliostomatidae.
