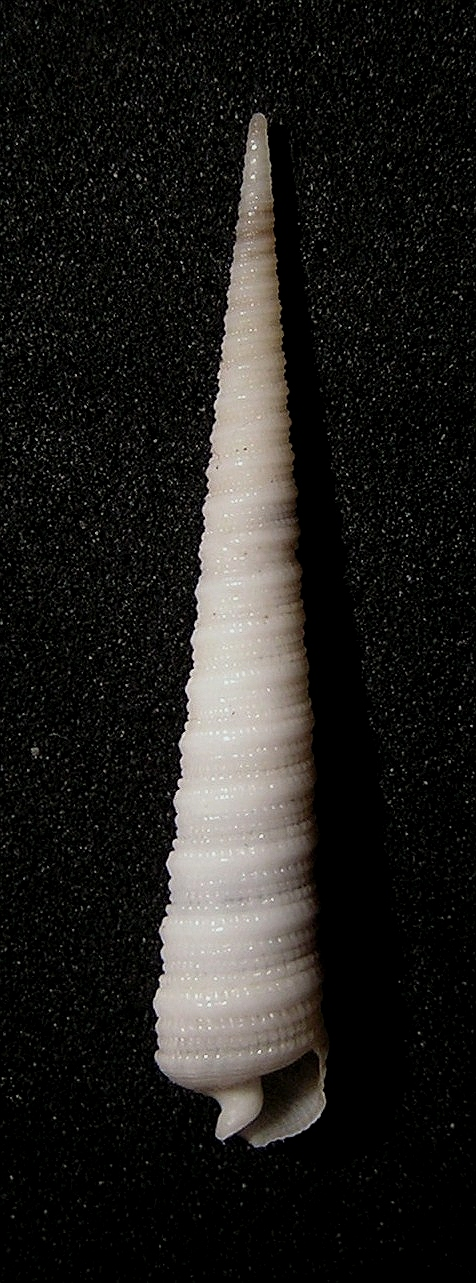
- Apertural view of a shell of Terebra hoaraui

Scientific classification
- Kingdom: Animalia
- Phylum: Mollusca
- Class: Gastropoda
- Subclass: Caenogastropoda
- Order: Neogastropoda
- Family: Terebridae
- Genus: Terebra
- Species: T. hoaraui

Binomial name
- Terebra hoaraui Drivas & Jay, 1998

Synonyms
- Cinguloterebra hoaraui (Drivas & Jay, 1988); Triplostephanus hoaraui (Drivas & Jay, 1988)

= Terebra hoaraui =

Species of gastropod

Terebra hoaraui is a species of sea snail, a marine gastropod mollusc in the family Terebridae, the auger snails. These snails are known for their long, slender shells that look like tiny drills or augers. Terebra hoaraui is a marine species, meaning it lives in the ocean. It was first described by French scientist Bratcher in 1981. Just like other auger snails, it is a carnivorous species, usually preying on small marine worms by injecting venom through a specialised tooth.

== Description ==
The length of the shell varies between 40 mm and 56 mm.

== Distribution ==
This marine species occurs off Réunion, Japan, the Philippines and the Marquesas.
