= Alvania acuticarinata =

Scientific classification
- Kingdom: Animalia
- Phylum: Mollusca
- Class: Gastropoda
- Subclass: Caenogastropoda
- Order: Littorinimorpha
- Superfamily: Rissooidea
- Family: Rissoidae
- Genus: Alvania
- Species: †A. acuticarinata

Binomial name
- †Alvania acuticarinata Landau, Ceulemans & Van Dingenen, 2018

Synonyms
- † Delphinula carinata Millet, 1854 (invalid: junior homonym of Delphinula carinata Woodward, 1833; Alvania acuticarinata is a replacement name)

Species of gastropod

Alvania acuticarinata is an extinct species of minute sea snail, a marine gastropod mollusc or micromollusk in the family Rissoidae.

== Distribution ==
Fossils of this marine species were found in upper Miocene strata in northwestern France.
