= Mcleaniella =

Scientific classification
- Kingdom: Animalia
- Phylum: Mollusca
- Class: Gastropoda
- Subclass: Vetigastropoda
- Order: Trochida
- Superfamily: Trochoidea
- Family: Liotiidae
- Genus: †Mcleaniella; Pacaud, 2018

Extinct genus of gastropods

Mcleaniella is an extinct genus of sea snails or marine gastropod mollusks in the family Liotiidae.

== Species ==
Species within the genus Mcleaniella include:

- † Mcleaniella danae (d'Orbigny, 1850)
