= Conus fuerteventurensis =

Scientific classification
- Domain: Eukaryota
- Kingdom: Animalia
- Phylum: Mollusca
- Class: Gastropoda
- Subclass: Caenogastropoda
- Order: Neogastropoda
- Superfamily: Conoidea
- Family: Conidae
- Genus: Conus
- Species: †C. fuerteventurensis

Binomial name
- †Conus fuerteventurensis Vera-Peláez & Martín-González, 2018

Extinct species of gastropod

Conus fuerteventurensis is an extinct species of sea snail, a marine gastropod mollusk, in the family Conidae, the cone snails and their allies.

== Distribution ==
This species occurs in the Canary Islands.
