= Morula mionigra =

Scientific classification
- Kingdom: Animalia
- Phylum: Mollusca
- Class: Gastropoda
- Subclass: Caenogastropoda
- Order: Neogastropoda
- Superfamily: Muricoidea
- Family: Muricidae
- Subfamily: Ergalataxinae
- Genus: Morula
- Species: †M. mionigra

Binomial name
- †Morula mionigra Martín-González, 2018

Extinct species of gastropod

Morula mionigra is an extinct species of sea snail, a marine gastropod mollusk of the family Muricidae, the murex snails or rock snails.

== Distribution ==
This species occurs in Canaries.
