= Sutneria =

Sutneria Temporal range: Late Jurassic

Scientific classification
- Kingdom: Animalia
- Phylum: Mollusca
- Class: Cephalopoda
- Subclass: Ammonoidea
- Order: Ammonitida
- Superfamily: Perisphinctoidea
- Family: Aulicostephanidae
- Genus: Sutneria Reinecke, 1818

Extinct genus of molluscs

Sutneria is a genus of small ammonites from the Upper Jurassic (Kimmeridgian) of Europe (Germany). Its shell is generally evolute with a narrowly rounded whorl section and tubercles along the lower flanks.

Sutneria is assigned to the Aulicostephanidae, part of the superfamily Perisphinctoidea.
