= Hosselkus Limestone =

Geological formation in California, United States

- Stratigraphic range: Late Triassic, 237–201 Ma
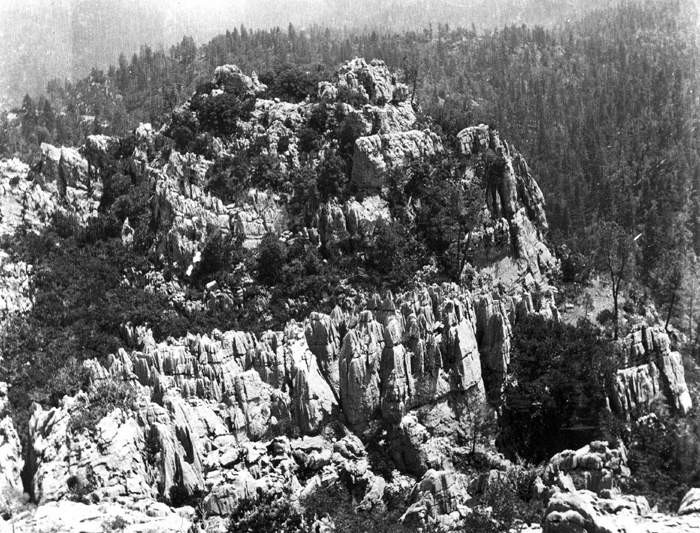
- Weathered portions of the Hosselkus Limestone
- Type: Geological formation
- Thickness: up to 140 feet (40 m)

Lithology
- Primary: Limestone
- Other: granite, slate, sandstone

Location
- Coordinates: 40.06°N 120.72°W
- Region: California
- Country: United States

Type section
- Named for: Hosselkus Creek, Plumas County, California
- Named by: Diller, J. S.
- Year defined: 1892

The Hosselkus Limestone is an Upper Triassic fossiliferous marine micritic limestone formation that outcrops in Plumas and Shasta Counties, California. It is known for its invertebrate fauna, most notably the many species of shelled cephalopods.

== Geology ==
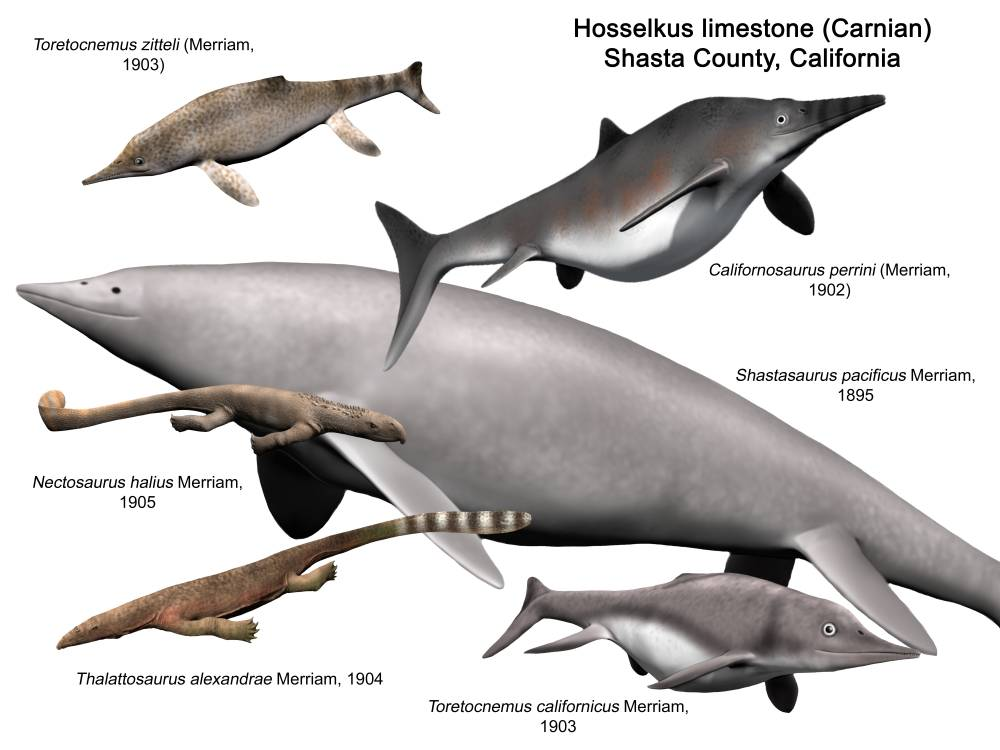
Fauna of the Hosselkus Limestone

The geologic column of the nearby Taylorsville region shows the Hosselkus Limestone as 140 ft thick and of Late Triassic (early Karnian) age. It is well exposed near the Cosmopolitan mine on the divide between the Genesee Valley and Hosselkus Creek. It has been recognized at numerous outcrops between Spanish Ranch and Prattville and northwestward beyond Pit River in the Klamath Mountains, and is considered to be younger than the Swearinger slates and older than the Trail beds. It contains numerous Arcestes and abundant pentagonal crinoid stems which indicate it is of Late Triassic age.

== Paleofauna ==
Over 208 described species of invertebrates have been found in the Hosselkus Limestone and nearby Brock Mountain. These species include shellfish, nautilus, snails, and ammonites. Many of these species can be also found in the Mediterranean region, which shows a much closer connection between the American and Mediterranean regions. The Great Basin sea was then the western end of the ancient Tethys, of which the Indian sea was the eastern limit.

A noteworthy feature of this fauna is the abundance of Trachyceras in the area, as in the Mediterranean that genus had dissipated before the advent of the Tropites fauna. This area is rather sharply separated into two faunal subzones. The lower, the Trachyceras subzone, carries an abundance of Trachyceras, Tropites, Paratropites, and Clionites. The upper subzone carries a few survivors of the Tropites group, Juvavites, Gonionotites, Metasibrites, and Arcestes. Discotropites, Sagenites, and the nautiloids occur in nearly equal numbers in the two subzones.

== Vertebrates ==
Color key: Taxon / Reclassified taxon / Taxon falsely reported as present / Dubious taxon or junior synonym / Ichnotaxon / Ootaxon / Morphotaxon	Notes; Uncertain or tentative taxa are in small text; ~~crossed out~~ taxa are discredited.

Vertebrates of the Hosselkus Limestone
Genus	Species	Notes	Image
Merriamia	M. zitteli	An extinct genus of ichthyosaur. Now referred to as Toretocnemus zitteli.	
Nectosaurus	N. halius	A genus of marine diapsid reptile.	Thalattosaurus and Nectosaurus
Shastasaurus	S. alexandrae	Now referred to S. pacificus.	Shastasaurus
Shastasaurus	S. altispinus	Now referred to S. pacificus.	Shastasaurus
Shastasaurus	S. careyi	Remains formerly attributed to S. careyi are now thought to be from an indeterminate species of Shonisaurus.	Shastasaurus
Shastasaurus	S. osmonti	Now referred to S. pacificus.	Shastasaurus
Shastasaurus	S. pacificus	An extinct genus of ichthyosaur.	Shastasaurus
Shonisaurus	Indeterminate.	An extinct genus of ichthyosaur. Now known as Shonisaurus popularis.	Shonisaurus
Thalattosaurus	T. alexandrae	An extinct genus of marine reptile.	Thalattosaurus
Thalattosaurus	T. perrini?	Type skull of T. perrini has not been located.	Thalattosaurus
Thalattosaurus	T. shastensis?	Remains formerly attributed to T. shastensis are now thought to be from an indeterminate species.	Thalattosaurus
Toretocnemus	T. californicus	An extinct genus of ichthyosaur.	
Toretocnemus	T. perrini	An extinct genus of ichthyosaur.	

== Invertebrates ==
Invertebrates of the Hosselkus Limestone
Genus	Species	Location	Member	Abundance	Notes	Images
Tropites	T. armatus				A genus of extinct cephalopods.	
Tropites	T. arthaberi				A genus of extinct cephalopods.	
Tropites	T. brockensis				A genus of extinct cephalopods.	
Tropites	T. dieneri				A genus of extinct cephalopods.	
Tropites	T. dilleri				A genus of extinct cephalopods.	
Tropites	T. discobullatus				A genus of extinct cephalopods.	
Tropites	T. fusobullatus				A genus of extinct cephalopods.	
Tropites	T. hessi				A genus of extinct cephalopods.	
Tropites	T. johnsoni				A genus of extinct cephalopods.	
Tropites	T. keili				A genus of extinct cephalopods.	
Tropites	T. kellyi				A genus of extinct cephalopods.	
Tropites	T. kokeni				A genus of extinct cephalopods.	
Tropites	T. mojsvarensis				A genus of extinct cephalopods.	
Tropites	T. morani				A genus of extinct cephalopods.	
Tropites	T. morloti				A genus of extinct cephalopods.	
Tropites	T. occidentalis				A genus of extinct cephalopods.	
Tropites	T. phillippi				A genus of extinct cephalopods.	
Tropites	T. reticulatus				A genus of extinct cephalopods.	
Tropites	T. rotatorius				A genus of extinct cephalopods.	
Tropites	T. rothpletzi				A genus of extinct cephalopods.	
Tropites	T. schellwienesis				A genus of extinct cephalopods.	
Tropites	T. shastensis				A genus of extinct cephalopods.	
Tropites	T. shearnsi				A genus of extinct cephalopods.	
Tropites	T. subbullatus				A genus of extinct cephalopods.	
Tropites	T. torquillus				A genus of extinct cephalopods.	
Tropites	T. traski				A genus of extinct cephalopods.	
Tropites	T. urensis				A genus of extinct cephalopods.	
Tropites	T. welleri				A genus of extinct cephalopods.	
Tropites	T. wodani				A genus of extinct cephalopods.	
Anatropites	A. hauchecornei				A genus in the ceratitid family Tropitidae.	
Mierotropites	M. tubercularis				A genus of extinct cephalopods. Sometimes referred to as Tropites.	
Margarites	M. jokelyi				A genus of extinct cephalopods. Today referred as Hoplotropites jokelyi.	
Margarites	M. senilis				A genus of extinct cephalopods. Today referred as Hoplotropites.	
Margarites	M. septeotrionalis				A genus of extinct cephalopods. Today referred as Hoplotropites.	
Discotropites	D. davisi				A genus in the ceratitid family Tropitidae.	
Discotropites	D. empedoelis				A genus in the ceratitid family Tropitidae.	
Discotropites	D. formosus				A genus in the ceratitid family Tropitidae.	
Discotropites	D. gemmellaroi				A genus in the ceratitid family Tropitidae.	
Discotropites	D. laurae				A genus in the ceratitid family Tropitidae.	
Discotropites	D. lineatus				A genus in the ceratitid family Tropitidae.	
Discotropites	D. mojsvarensis				A genus in the ceratitid family Tropitidae.	
Discotropites	D. sandlingensis				A genus in the ceratitid family Tropitidae.	
Discotropites	D. sengeli				A genus in the ceratitid family Tropitidae.	
Discotropites	D. theron				A genus in the ceratitid family Tropitidae.	
Paratropites	D. arnoldi				A genus in the ceratitid family Tropitidae.	
Paratropites	D. antiselli				A genus in the ceratitid family Tropitidae.	
Paratropites	D. dittmari				A genus in the ceratitid family Tropitidae.	
Paratropites	D. gabbi				A genus in the ceratitid family Tropitidae.	
Paratropites	D. graeilis				A genus in the ceratitid family Tropitidae.	
Paratropites	D. sellai				A genus in the ceratitid family Tropitidae.	
Gymnotropites	G. americanus				A genus in the ceratitid family Tropitidae.	
Gymnotropites	G. californicus				A genus in the ceratitid family Tropitidae.	
Gymnotropites	G. laevis				A genus in the ceratitid family Tropitidae.	
Gymnotropites	G. rotundus				A genus in the ceratitid family Tropitidae.	
Gymnotropites	G. yatesi				A genus in the ceratitid family Tropitidae.	
Paulotropites	P. colei				A genus in the ceratitid family Tropitidae.	
Paulotropites	P. shastensis				A genus in the ceratitid family Tropitidae.	
Tornquistites	T. evolutus				A genus in the ceratitid family Tropitidae.	
Tornquistites	T. obolinus				A genus in the ceratitid family Tropitidae.	
Homerites	H. semiglobosus				A genus of small, involute, globase fossil ceratitids.	
Jovites	J. pacificus				A genus in the ceratitid family Tropitidae.	
Bacchites	B. baccus				A genus of extinct ammonoid cephalopods belonging to the ceratitid family.	
Bacchites	B. pinguis				A genus of extinct ammonoid cephalopods belonging to the ceratitid family.	
Bacchites	B. sphaericus				A genus of extinct ammonoid cephalopods belonging to the ceratitid family.	
Leconteiceras	L. californicum				A genus of extinct ammonoid cephalopods belonging to the clionitidae family.	
Leconteiceras	L. occidentale				A genus of extinct ammonoid cephalopods belonging to the clionitidae family.	
Celtites	C. steindachneri				A genus of extinct ammonoid cephalopods belonging to the ceratitid family.	
Tropiceltites	T. caducucs				A genus of extinct ammonoid cephalopods belonging to the tropiceltitidae family.	
Sagenites	S. dickersoni				A genus of extinct ammonoid cephalopods belonging to the haloritidae family.	
Sagenites	S. erinaceus				A genus of extinct ammonoid cephalopods belonging to the haloritidae family.	
Sagenites	S. herbiehi				A genus of extinct ammonoid cephalopods belonging to the haloritidae family.	
Sagenites	S. shastensis				A genus of extinct ammonoid cephalopods belonging to the haloritidae family.	
Juvavites	J. adalberti				A genus of extinct ammonoid cephalopods belonging to the juvavitidae family.	
Juvavites	J. brockensis				A genus of extinct ammonoid cephalopods belonging to the juvavitidae family.	
Juvavites	J. damesi				A genus of extinct ammonoid cephalopods belonging to the juvavitidae family.	
Juvavites	J. edgari				A genus of extinct ammonoid cephalopods belonging to the juvavitidae family.	
Juvavites	J. externiplicatus				A genus of extinct ammonoid cephalopods belonging to the juvavitidae family.	
Juvavites	J. intermittens				A genus of extinct ammonoid cephalopods belonging to the juvavitidae family.	
Juvavites	J. kellyi				A genus of extinct ammonoid cephalopods belonging to the juvavitidae family.	
Juvavites	J. knowitoni				A genus of extinct ammonoid cephalopods belonging to the juvavitidae family.	
Juvavites	J. konninki				A genus of extinct ammonoid cephalopods belonging to the juvavitidae family.	
Juvavites	J. mendenhalli				A genus of extinct ammonoid cephalopods belonging to the juvavitidae family.	
Juvavites	J. obsoletus				A genus of extinct ammonoid cephalopods belonging to the juvavitidae family.	
Juvavites	J. shastensis				A genus of extinct ammonoid cephalopods belonging to the juvavitidae family.	
Juvavites	J. subintermittens				A genus of extinct ammonoid cephalopods belonging to the juvavitidae family.	
Juvavites	J. subinterruptus				A genus of extinct ammonoid cephalopods belonging to the juvavitidae family.	
Juvavites	J. strongi				A genus of extinct ammonoid cephalopods belonging to the juvavitidae family.	
Gonionotites	G. byatti				A genus of extinct ammonoid cephalopods belonging to the ceratitid family.	
Gonionotites	G. northi				A genus of extinct ammonoid cephalopods belonging to the ceratitid family.	
Metasibirites	M. brockensis				A genus of extinct ammonoid cephalopods belonging to the metasibiritidae family.	
Metasibirites	M. coei				A genus of extinct ammonoid cephalopods belonging to the metasibiritidae family.	
Metasibirites	M. frechi				A genus of extinct ammonoid cephalopods belonging to the metasibiritidae family.	
Metasibirites	M. gracilis				A genus of extinct ammonoid cephalopods belonging to the metasibiritidae family.	
Metasibirites	M. modestus				A genus of extinct ammonoid cephalopods belonging to the metasibiritidae family.	
Metasibirites	M. mojsvareusis				A genus of extinct ammonoid cephalopods belonging to the metasibiritidae family.	
Metasibirites	M. parvus				A genus of extinct ammonoid cephalopods belonging to the metasibiritidae family.	
Metasibirites	M. pusillus				A genus of extinct ammonoid cephalopods belonging to the metasibiritidae family.	
Metasibirites	M. pygmaeus				A genus of extinct ammonoid cephalopods belonging to the metasibiritidae family.	
Metasibirites	M. shastensis				A genus of extinct ammonoid cephalopods belonging to the metasibiritidae family.	
Arcestes	A. carpenteri				A genus of extinct ammonoid cephalopods belonging to the ceratitid family.	Arcestes
Arcestes	A. pacificus				A genus of extinct ammonoid cephalopods belonging to the ceratitid family.	Arcestes
Arcestes	A. shastensis				A genus of extinct ammonoid cephalopods belonging to the ceratitid family.	Arcestes
Arcestes	A. traski				A genus of extinct ammonoid cephalopods belonging to the ceratitid family.	Arcestes
Arcestes	A. whitneyi				A genus of extinct ammonoid cephalopods belonging to the ceratitid family.	Arcestes
Arcestes	A. winnemae				A genus of extinct ammonoid cephalopods belonging to the ceratitid family.	Arcestes
Paraganides	P. califoraieus				A genus of extinct ammonoid cephalopods.	
Dieneria	D. arthaberi				A genus of extinct ammonoid cephalopods belonging to the ceratitid family.	
Fremontites	F. ashleyi				A genus of extinct ammonoid cephalopods.	
Hauerites	H. lawsoni				A genus of extinct ammonoid cephalopods belonging to the tibetitidae family.	
Klamathites	K. kellyi				A genus of extinct ammonoid cephalopods.	
Klamathites	K. schueuerti				A genus of extinct ammonoid cephalopods.	
Pinacoceras	P. rex				A genus of extinct ammonoid cephalopods belonging to the ceratitid family.	
Discophyllites	D. patens				A genus of discoidal, generally evolute Phylloceratina.	
Sirentes	S. lawsoni					
Sandlingites	S. andersoni				A genus of extinct ammonoid cephalopods belonging to the ceratitid family.	
Sandlingites	S. oribasus				A genus of extinct ammonoid cephalopods belonging to the ceratitid family.	
Trachycereas	T. beckeri					
Trachycereas	T. californicum					
Trachycereas	T. leeontei					
Trachycereas	T. lindgreni					
Trachycereas	T. madisonense					
Trachycereas	T. shastense					
Clionites	C. americus				A genus of the clydonitacean family Clionitidae.	
Clionites	C. californicus				A genus of the clydonitacean family Clionitidae.	
Clionites	C. careyi				A genus of the clydonitacean family Clionitidae.	
Clionites	C. compactus				A genus of the clydonitacean family Clionitidae.	
Clionites	C. compressus				A genus of the clydonitacean family Clionitidae.	
Clionites	C. evolutus				A genus of the clydonitacean family Clionitidae.	
Clionites	C. fairbanksi				A genus of the clydonitacean family Clionitidae.	
Clionites	C. merriami				A genus of the clydonitacean family Clionitidae.	
Clionites	C. minutus				A genus of the clydonitacean family Clionitidae.	
Clionites	C. nanus				A genus of the clydonitacean family Clionitidae.	
Clionites	C. osmonti				A genus of the clydonitacean family Clionitidae.	
Clionites	C. robustus				A genus of the clydonitacean family Clionitidae.	
Clionites	C. rugosus				A genus of the clydonitacean family Clionitidae.	
Clionites	C. stantoni				A genus of the clydonitacean family Clionitidae.	
Clionites	C. tornquisti				A genus of the clydonitacean family Clionitidae.	
Clionites	C. whitneyi				A genus of the clydonitacean family Clionitidae.	
Metatirolites	M. foliaceus				A genus of extinct ammonoid cephalopods belonging to the ussuritidae family.	
Metatirolites	M. quadrangulus				A genus of extinct ammonoid cephalopods belonging to the ussuritidae family.	
Metatirolites	M. subpygmaeus				A genus of extinct ammonoid cephalopods belonging to the ussuritidae family.	
Thisbites	T. uhligi				A genus of extinct ammonoid cephalopods belonging to the thisbitidae family.	
Choristoceras	C. kellyi				A genus of extinct ammonoid cephalopods belonging to the choristoceratidae family.	
Choristoceras	C. klamathease				A genus of extinct ammonoid cephalopods belonging to the choristoceratidae family.	
Arpadites	A. gabbi				A genus of Ceratitids in the family arpaditida.	
Arpadites	A. kingi				A genus of Ceratitids in the family arpaditida.	
Atractites	A. drakei				A genus of Ceratitids in the family xiphoteuthididae.	
Atractites	A. philippii				A genus of Ceratitids in the family xiphoteuthididae.	
Dietyoconites	D. americanus					
Proclydonautilus	P. hessi				A genus of the clydonitacean family Clionitidae.	
Proclydonautilus	P. sauperi				A genus of the clydonitacean family Clionitidae.	
Proclydonautilus	P. spirolobus				A genus of the clydonitacean family Clionitidae.	
Proclydonautilus	P. stantoni				A genus of the clydonitacean family Clionitidae.	
Proclydonautilus	P. triadieus				A genus of the clydonitacean family Clionitidae.	
Oxynautius	O. acutus				A genus of the clydonitacean family syringonautilidae.	
Gryptoceras	G. cooperi					
Mojsvaroceras	M. turneri				A genus of Ceratitids in the family Tainoceratidae.	
Cosmonautilus	C. dilleri				A genus of cephalopods included in the nautilid family Clydonautilidae.	
Cosmonautilus	C. hersheyi				A genus of cephalopods included in the nautilid family Clydonautilidae.	
Cosmonautilus	C. pacificus				A genus of cephalopods included in the nautilid family Clydonautilidae.	
Cosmonautilus	C. shastensis				A genus of cephalopods included in the nautilid family Clydonautilidae.	
Halobia	H. cordillerana				A genus of cephalopods included in the nautilid family Halobiidae.	
Halobia	H. austriaca				A genus of cephalopods included in the nautilid family Halobiidae.	
Halobia	H. gigantia				A genus of cephalopods included in the nautilid family Halobiidae.	
Halobia	H. ornatissima				A genus of cephalopods included in the nautilid family Halobiidae.	
Halobia	H. rugosa				A genus of cephalopods included in the nautilid family Halobiidae.	
Halobia	H. superba				A genus of cephalopods included in the nautilid family Halobiidae.	
Avicula	A. soperi				A genus of molluscs in the family Pteriidae.	
Gervilleia	G. shastensis				A genus of molluscs in the family Bakevelliidae.	
Pecten	P. sheddi				A genus of large scallops or saltwater clams, marine bivalve mollusks in the family Pectinidae.	Pecten (bivalve)
Lima	L. kimballi				A genus of molluscs in the family Limidae.	
Dimyodon	D. storrsi				A genus of molluscs in the family Dimyidae.	
Pachycardia	P. digglesi				A genus of molluscs.	
Cardita	C. jenkinsi				A genus of marine bivalve molluscs, in the family Carditidae.	
Myophoria	M. brockensis				An extinct genus of bivalve mollusk from Europe belonging to the family Myophoriidae.	Myophoria
Mytilus	M. ursensis				A genus of marine bivalve molluscs, in the family Mytilidae.	Mytilus
Posidonia	P. jacksoni				An extinct genus of Ostreoidean bivalves.	
Posidonia	P. madisoniensis				An extinct genus of Ostreoidean bivalves.	
Anoplophors	A. shastensis					
Unicardium	U. gleimi				A genus of marine bivalve molluscs, in the family Mactromyidae.	
Worthenia	W. klamathensis				A genus of fossil sea snails, an extinct marine gastropod.	
Collonia	C. occidentalis				A genus of small sea snails with calcareous opercula, marine gastropod mollusks in the family Colloniidae.	
Collonia	C. obesa				A genus of small sea snails with calcareous opercula, marine gastropod mollusks in the family Colloniidae.	
Patella	P. sheehani				A genus of sea snails with gills, typical true limpets, marine gastropod mollusks in the family Patellidae.	Patella
Patella	P. stuarti				A genus of sea snails with gills, typical true limpets, marine gastropod mollusks in the family Patellidae.	Patella
Capulus	C. silverthorni				A genus of small sea snails, marine gastropod mollusks in the family Capulidae	Capulus
Omphaloptychia	O. shastensis				A genus of fossil sea snails, in the family Coelostylinidae.	
Dielasma	D. julicum				A genus of extinct brachiopods, or lamp shells.	
Terebratula	T. pyriformis				A modern genus of brachiopod with a fossil record dating back to the Late Devonian.	Terebratula
Spiriferina	S. coreyi				An extinct genus of brachiopods.	Spiriferina
Spirigera	S. milesi				An extinct species of brachiopods.	
Rhynchonella	R. howardi				An extinct genus of brachiopod, from the family Rhynchonellidae.	Rhynchonella
Rhynchonella	R. richardsoni				An extinct genus of brachiopod, from the family Rhynchonellidae.	Rhynchonella
Rhynchonella	R. winnemae				An extinct genus of brachiopod, from the family Rhynchonellidae.	Rhynchonella
Isocrinus	I. californicus				An extinct species of feather star.	Isocrinus

== Fungi ==
Flora of the Hosselkus Limestone
Genus	Species	Family
Polycyclus	P. henseli	Parmulariaceae
Polycyclus	P. major	Parmulariaceae
Polycyclus	P. nodifer	Parmulariaceae
