= Badiotites =

Scientific classification
- Kingdom: Animalia
- Phylum: Mollusca
- Class: Cephalopoda
- Subclass: †Ammonoidea
- Order: †Ceratitida
- Family: †Badiotitidae
- Genus: †Badiotites; Mojsisovics, 1879

Genus of molluscs (fossil)

Badiotites is a genus of extinct ammonoid cephalopods belonging to the ceratitid family Badiotitidae. It was previously included with Lecanites in the Lecanitidae, a family formerly of the Clydonitoidea but reassigned by Tozer (1981) to the Danubitoidea. The Badiotitidae is included in the Ceratitoidea.

Badiotites is evolute, compressed, and discoidal, with sigmoidal ribs, an acutely rounded venter, and a goniatitic suture. It differs from Lecanites in that Lecanites is essentially smooth.

Badiotites comes from the Middle and Upper Triassic of the Alps, Greece, Hungary., Nepal, and British Columbia
