= Qulonggongba Formation =

Geologic formation in Nyalam County, Tibet

- Stratigraphic range: Norian, ~215.56–212.0 Ma
- Type: Geological formation
- Unit of: Langjiexue Group
- Underlies: Qudenggongba Formation & Derirong Formation
- Overlies: Tulong Group

Lithology
- Primary: Mudstone
- Other: Siltstone, sandstone, limestone

Location
- Coordinates: 25.5°N 104.9°E
- Approximate paleocoordinates: 11.7°N 94.2°E
- Region: Southern Tibet
- Country: China
- Extent: Nyalam, Tingri

Type section
- Named for: Cholung Gompa
- Named by: Qingge Gu
- Location: Longjiang Xishan, 2 km west of Longjiang Village, southern Tingri
- Year defined: 1965
- Qulonggongba Formation (China) Qulonggongba Formation (Tibet)

The Qulonggongba Formation is a Late Triassic (Norian) geologic formation in southern Tibet, near to the border with Nepal, that is part of the Langjiexue Group. It would have been a marine environment.

== Vertebrate fauna ==
=== Reptiles ===
Genus	Species	Material	Notes
Himalayasaurus	H. tibetensis	Fragmentary skeletons	A gigantic ichthyosaur

=== Cartilaginous fish ===
Genus	Species	Presence	Notes
Hybodontidae gen. indet.	Indeterminate		

=== Conodonts ===
Genus	Species	Location	Stratigraphic position	Notes
Epigondolella	E. multidentata	Tulong, Tingri	Indojuvavites angulatus–Epigondolella multidentata–Himalayasaurus Zone	
Metapolygnathus	Indeterminate			

== Invertebrates ==
=== Ammonites ===
Genus	Species	Location	Stratigraphic position	Notes
Acanthinites	Indeterminate	Sūrè Shan	Indojuvavites angulatus–Epigondolella multidentata–Himalayasaurus Zone	A ceratitid
Ammotibetites	A. wheeleri	Longjiang Xishan		A ceratitid
Anasibirites	A. kingianus	Tulong	Griesbachites–Guembilites Zone	A ceratitid
Anatibetites	Indeterminate	Longjiang Xishan, Tulong	Griesbachites–Guembilites Zone	A ceratitid
Anatomites	A. ex gr. "sissi"	Longjiang Xishan, Sūrè Shan, Tulong	Griesbachites–Guembilites Zone	A ceratitid
Anatomites	Indeterminate	Tulong, Tingri	Indojuvavites angulatus–Epigondolella multidentata–Himalayasaurus Zone	A ceratitid
Arcestes	Indeterminate	Longjiang Xishan, Sūrè Shan		A ceratitid
Cladiscites	Indeterminate	Longjiang Xishan, Sūrè Shan	Griesbachites–Guembilites Zone	A ceratitid
Cosmonautilus	Indeterminate	Sūrè Shan		A nautilid
Cyrtopleurites	C. cf. agrippinae	Longjiang Xishan		A ceratitid
Cyrtopleurites	Indeterminate	Tulong, Tingri	Indojuvavites angulatus–Epigondolella multidentata–Himalayasaurus Zone	A ceratitid
Dimorphites	Indeterminate	Tulong, Tingri	Indojuvavites angulatus–Epigondolella multidentata–Himalayasaurus Zone	A ceratitid
Discophyllites	Indeterminate	Longjiang Xishan	Griesbachites–Guembilites Zone	An ammonitid
Dittmarites	D. lilliformis	Longjiang Xishan		A ceratitid
Ectolcites	E. cf. hollandi	Longjiang Xishan		A ceratitid
Gonionotites	Indeterminate	Longjiang Xishan	Griesbachites–Guembilites Zone	A ceratitid
Griesbachites	G. pseudomedleyanus	Longjiang Xishan, Tulong	Griesbachites–Guembilites Zone	A ceratitid
Griesbachites	Indeterminate	Longjiang Xishan, Tulong	Griesbachites–Guembilites Zone	A ceratitid
Guembelites	G. jandianus	Longjiang, Tulong	Griesbachites–Guembilites Zone	A ceratitid
Guembelites	G. philostrati	Longjiang Xishan, Tulong	Griesbachites–Guembilites Zone	A ceratitid
Halorites	Indeterminate	Sūrè Shan		A ceratitid
?Hauerites	Indeterminate	Longjiang Xishan	Griesbachites–Guembilites Zone	A ceratitid
Indojuvavites	I. angulatus	Kagangla Pass, Longjiang Xishan, Sūrè Shan, Tulong	Indojuvavites angulatus–Epigondolella multidentata–Himalayasaurus Zone	A ceratitid
Juvavites	J. cf. subinterruptus	Tulong	Griesbachites–Guembilites Zone	A ceratitid
Juvavites	J. continuus	Tulong, Tingri	Indojuvavites angulatus–Epigondolella multidentata–Himalayasaurus Zone	A ceratitid
Juvavites	J. sarasinii	Tulong, Tingri	Indojuvavites angulatus–Epigondolella multidentata–Himalayasaurus Zone	A ceratitid
Megaphyllites	Indeterminate	Sūrè Shan		A ceratitid
Metacarnites	Indeterminate	Longjiang Xishan, Sūrè Shan		A ceratitid
Metacarnites	"M. xizangensis"	Tulong, Tingri	Indojuvavites angulatus–Epigondolella multidentata–Himalayasaurus Zone	A ceratitid
?Mirojuvavites	"M. xizangensis"	Tulong, Tingri	Indojuvavites angulatus–Epigondolella multidentata–Himalayasaurus Zone	A ceratitid
Parajuvavites	Intermediate	Longjiang Xishan	Griesbachites–Guembilites Zone	A ceratitid
?Parathisbites	Indeterminate	Sūrè Shan		A ceratitid
Paratibetites	P. adolphi	Longjiang Xishan, Sūrè Shan		A ceratitid
Paratibetites	?P. tornquisti	Longjiang Xishan	Griesbachites–Guembilites Zone	A ceratitid
Paratibetites	Indeterminate	Tulong, Tingri	Indojuvavites angulatus–Epigondolella multidentata–Himalayasaurus Zone	A ceratitid
Pinacoceras	Indeterminate	Longjiang Xishan		A ceratitid
Placites	P. cf. oldhami	Longjiang Xishan		A ceratitid
Placites	Indeterminate	Sūrè Shan		A ceratitid
Stenarcestes	Indeterminate	Longjiang Xishan	Griesbachites–Guembilites Zone	A ceratitid
?Thisbites	Indeterminate	Longjiang Xishan		A ceratitid
Tibetites	T. ryalli	Longjiang Xishan, Sūrè Shan		A ceratitid
Tibetites	Indeterminate	Longjiang Xishan		A ceratitid

=== Bivalves ===
Genus	Species	Location (section)	Stratigraphic position	Notes
Burmesia	B. lirata	Tulong	Griesbachites–Guembilites Zone	Member of Anomalodesmata
Cardita	Indeterminate	Longjiang Xishan, Sūrè Shan		
Cassianella	Indeterminate	Longjiang Xishan, Sūrè Shan		Member of Ostreida
Halobia	Indeterminate	Longjiang Xishan, Tulong	Griesbachites–Guembilites Zone	Member of Ostreida
Halobia	H. cf. distincta	Tulong	Griesbachites–Guembilites Zone	Member of Ostreida
Halobia	H. sirri	Tulong	Griesbachites–Guembilites Zone	Member of Ostreida
Halobia	H. cf. jagelskyi	Tulong	Griesbachites–Guembilites Zone	Member of Ostreida
Indopecten	I. margariticostatus	Longjiang Xishan, Sūrè Shan, Tulong	Indojuvavites angulatus–Epigondolella multidentata–Himalayasaurus Zone	A scallop
Indopecten	I. himalayensis	Tulong	Griesbachites–Guembilites Zone	A scallop
?Lima	Indeterminate	Longjiang Xishan, Sūrè Shan		A file shell
Monotis	M. salinaria	Longjiang Xishan		Member of Pectinida
Myophoricardium	M. tulongense	Tulong, Tingri	Indojuvavites angulatus–Epigondolella multidentata–Himalayasaurus Zone	Member of Carditida
?Nucula	Indeterminate	Longjiang Xishan		A nut clam
?Palaeocardia	"P. singularis"	Tulong, Tingri	Indojuvavites angulatus–Epigondolella multidentata–Himalayasaurus Zone	
?Palaeocardia	"P. rhomboidalis"	Tulong, Tingri	Indojuvavites angulatus–Epigondolella multidentata–Himalayasaurus Zone	
Palaeoneilo	P. cf. tirolensis	Sūrè Shan		A nuculanid
Palaeonucula	P. strigilata	Tulong, Tingri	Indojuvavites angulatus–Epigondolella multidentata–Himalayasaurus Zone	A nuculanid
Palaeonucula	P. subaequilatera tswayensis	Tulong, Tingri	Indojuvavites angulatus–Epigondolella multidentata–Himalayasaurus Zone	A nuculanid
Palaeonucula	"P. timorensis"	Tulong, Tingri	Indojuvavites angulatus–Epigondolella multidentata–Himalayasaurus Zone	A nuculanid
Pecten	Indeterminate	Sūrè Shan		A scallop
Pleuromya	P. himaica	Longjiang Xishan		Member of Myida
Schafhaeutlia	Indeterminate	Longjiang Xishan, Sūrè Shan		A hatchet shell
Unionites	U. griesbachi	Longjiang Xishan, Sūrè Shan		Member of Unionida
Veteranella	V. (Ledoides) langnongensis	Tulong, Tingri	Indojuvavites angulatus–Epigondolella multidentata–Himalayasaurus Zone	A nuculanid

=== Brachiopods ===
Genus	Species	Location	Stratigraphic position	Notes
Eoseptaliphoria	E. intorta		Griesbachites–Guembilites Zone	A rhynchonellid
Eoseptaliphoria	E. tulungensis		Griesbachites–Guembilites Zone; Indojuvavites angulatus–Epigondolella multidentata–Himalayasaurus Zone	A rhynchonellid
"Himalarhynchia"	"H. media"		Griesbachites–Guembilites Zone; Indojuvavites angulatus–Epigondolella multidentata–Himalayasaurus Zone	
Nudirostralina	N. griesbachi		Griesbachites–Guembilites Zone	A rhynchonellid
Pseudolepismatina	P. nyalamensis		Griesbachites–Guembilites Zone	Member of Rhynchonellata
Tibetothyris	T. depressa		Griesbachites–Guembilites Zone	Member of Terebratulida
Spiriferina	S. shalshalensis		Griesbachites–Guembilites Zone; Indojuvavites angulatus–Epigondolella multidentata–Himalayasaurus Zone	Member of Rhynchonellata
