= Arctogymnites =

Arctogymnites Temporal range: middle Triassic

Scientific classification
- Kingdom: Animalia
- Phylum: Mollusca
- Class: Cephalopoda
- Subclass: †Ammonoidea
- Order: †Ceratitida
- Family: †Ceratitidae
- Genus: †Arctogymnites; Popov 1962

Genus of molluscs (fossil)

Arctogymnites is a genus of ammonoid cephalopods from the middle Triassic included in the ceratitid subfamily Beyrichitinae. Related genera include Beyrichites, Frechites, Gymnotoceras, and Salterites.

The Treatise Part L, 1957 separates the beyrichitids (Beyrichidae) as an independent family in the Ceratitaceae, separate from the Ceratitidae. Later (Tozer 1981) they were incorporated into the Ceratitidae as a subfamily.

== Taxonomy and species ==
The genus Arctogymnites was established by Popov in 1962. Species recorded in paleontological databases include Arctogymnites clivosus, Arctogymnites sonini, and Arctogymnites spektori. These species are known from the Triassic fossil record.
