= Dobrogeites =

Dobrogeites Temporal range: Anisian

Scientific classification
- Domain: Eukaryota
- Kingdom: Animalia
- Phylum: Mollusca
- Class: Cephalopoda
- Subclass: †Ammonoidea
- Order: †Ceratitida
- Family: †Megaphyllitidae
- Genus: †Dobrogeites; Kittle, 1908

Species
- See text

Genus of molluscs

Dobrogeites is a genus of ammonoids from the order Ceratitida, included in the family Megaphyllitidae that produced evolute compressed planispiral shells with rounded venters, inner whorls ornamented as in Tirolites, outer whorls smooth, suture with multiple smooth lobes; Initially found in Anisian (lower Triassic) sediments in Romania.

The Treatise on Invertebrate Paleontology, Part L put Dobrogeites in the Ceratitacean family Aplococeratidae. E.T. Tozer in 1981 includes the genus in the Megaphyllitidae, uniting it with Megaphyllites, Metasturia, and Nitanoceras.
