= Paraceratites elegans =

Paraceratites elegans Temporal range: 247.2–242.0 Ma

Scientific classification
- Domain: Eukaryota
- Kingdom: Animalia
- Phylum: Mollusca
- Class: Cephalopoda
- Subclass: †Ammonoidea
- Order: †Ceratitida
- Family: †Ceratitidae
- Genus: †Paraceratites
- Species: †P. elegans

Binomial name
- †Paraceratites elegans (Mojsisovics, 1882)

Synonyms
- †Ceratites elegans Mojsisovics, 1882

Extinct species of mollusc

Paraceratites elegans is an extinct species of ammonite cephalopod in the family Ceratitidae. It is known from the Triassic of China and Israel.
