= Xenodrepanites =

Xenodrepanites Temporal range: U Trias

Scientific classification
- Domain: Eukaryota
- Kingdom: Animalia
- Phylum: Mollusca
- Class: Cephalopoda
- Subclass: †Ammonoidea
- Order: †Ceratitida
- Superfamily: †Clydonitoidea
- Family: †Arpaditidae
- Genus: †Xenodrepanites; Diener (1916)

Genus of molluscs (fossil)

Xenodrepanites is an extinct ammonoid cephalopod genus belonging to the Ceratitida from the Upper Triassic of the Himalayas. Xenodrepanites has a very compressed, discoidal shell with a ventral furrow bordered by crenulated keels and a sub-ammonitic suture.

Some put Xenodrepanites in the Clydonitacan family, Cyrtopleuritidae instead.
