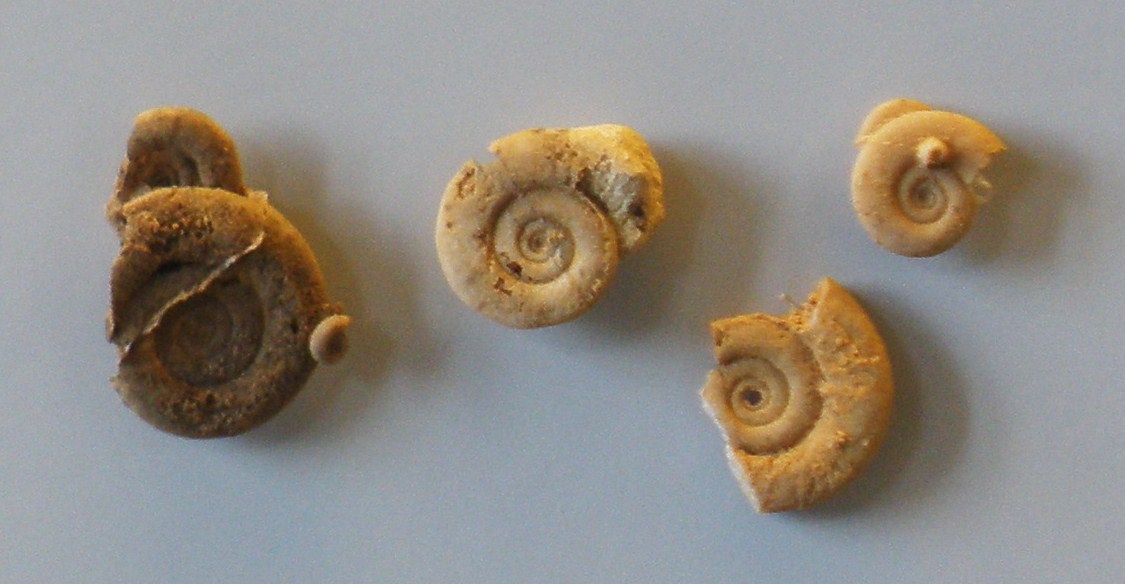
- Aplococeras misanii

Scientific classification
- Domain: Eukaryota
- Kingdom: Animalia
- Phylum: Mollusca
- Class: Cephalopoda
- Subclass: †Ammonoidea
- Order: †Ceratitida
- Family: †Aplococeratidae
- Genus: †Aplococeras; Hyatt, 1900

Synonyms
- Pseudaplococeras Spath, 1951

= Aplococeras =

Aplococeras Temporal range: Middle Triassic

Genus of molluscs (fossil)

Aplococeras is an evolute discoidal ceratitid ammonite from the Middle Triassic Ladinian stage, found in southern Europe and Nevada. Whorl sides are convex, converging on a rounded venter (the outer rim), and are ornamented with slightly flexuous umbilical ribs that disappear outwardly, towards the venter. The suture has two lateral lobes (on either side).

Apleuroceras and Velebites are related genera also from the Ladinian (Middle Triassic).
