= Olenekoceras =

Olenekoceras Temporal range: Olenekian

Scientific classification
- Kingdom: Animalia
- Phylum: Mollusca
- Class: Cephalopoda
- Subclass: †Ammonoidea
- Order: †Ceratitida
- Family: †Sibiritidae
- Subfamily: †Keyserlingitinae
- Genus: †Olenekoceras

Species
- O. laevigatum; O. middendorffi; O. nikitini; O. schrenki

Genus of molluscs (fossil)

Olenekoceras is an ammonoid cephalopod from the Lower Triassic included in the ceratitid family Sibiritidae, once included in the Noritaceae but now in the Ceratitaceae.

== Distribution ==
Japan and the Russian Federation.
