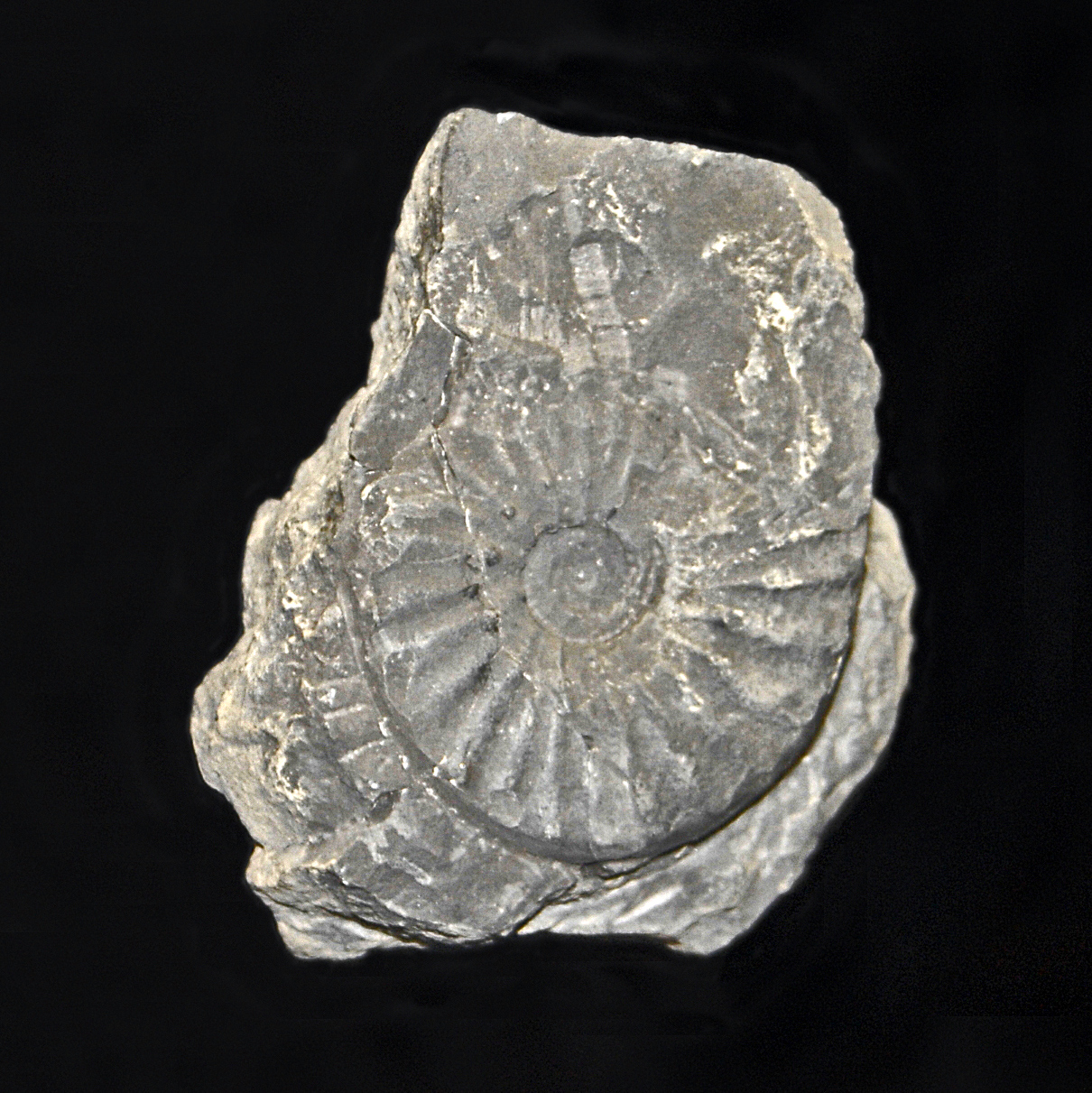
- Paraceratites subnodosus from Triassic – Lenna (Italy)

Scientific classification
- Kingdom: Animalia
- Phylum: Mollusca
- Class: Cephalopoda
- Subclass: †Ammonoidea
- Order: †Ceratitida
- Family: †Ceratitidae
- Genus: †Paraceratites
- Species: †P. subnodosus

Binomial name
- †Paraceratites subnodosus (Mojsisovics, 1882)

= Paraceratites subnodosus =

Paraceratites subnodosus Temporal range: Triassic 247.2–235.0 Ma

Extinct species of mollusc

Paraceratites subnodosus is an extinct species of ammonite cephalopods in the family Ceratitidae.

== Distribution ==
Fossils of Paraceratites subnodosus are found in the Triassic marine strata of China, Hungary, Israel and Italy.
