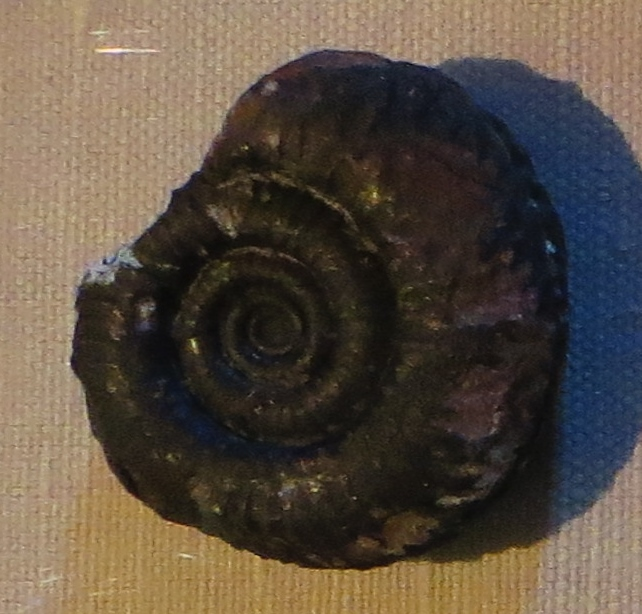

Scientific classification
- Domain: Eukaryota
- Kingdom: Animalia
- Phylum: Mollusca
- Class: Cephalopoda
- Subclass: †Ammonoidea
- Order: †Ceratitida
- Family: †Clionitidae
- Genus: †Clionites; Mojsisovics, 1893

= Clionites =

Clionites Temporal range: Upper Triassic

Genus of molluscs (fossil)

Clionites is a genus of the clydonitoidean family Clionitidae, and its type. The shell is evolute so as to expose all whorls which are covered with generally bifurcating sigmoidal ribs. The suture is ceratitid with two lateral lobes.

Clionites differs from Alloclionites in having sparser tubercles, finner ribbing, and not as high a whorl section. It has been found in Nevada, Southern Europe, and Asia.
