= Austroceratites =

Austroceratites Temporal range: Triassic

Scientific classification
- Domain: Eukaryota
- Kingdom: Animalia
- Phylum: Mollusca
- Class: Cephalopoda
- Subclass: †Ammonoidea
- Order: †Ceratitida
- Family: †Ceratitidae
- Subfamily: †Ceratitinae
- Genus: †Austroceratites; Wegner, 1957

Species
- See text

Genus of molluscs (fossil)

Austroceratites is a genus of extinct shelled cephalopods that lived during the Triassic, included in ammonoid order Ceratitida. Within the Ceratitida, Autroceratites belongs in the family Ceratitidae and subfamily Ceratitinae.

Ceratitidae, in which Austroceratites is placed, is a mid Triassic family that has left evolute to involute, stoutly ribbed, discoidal shells with ceratitic sutures.
