= Balatonites =

Balatonites Temporal range: Anisian Anisian

Scientific classification
- Domain: Eukaryota
- Kingdom: Animalia
- Phylum: Mollusca
- Class: Cephalopoda
- Subclass: †Ammonoidea
- Order: †Ceratitida
- Family: †Balatonitidae
- Genus: †Balatonites; Mojsisovics, 1879

Species
- See text

Genus of molluscs (fossil)

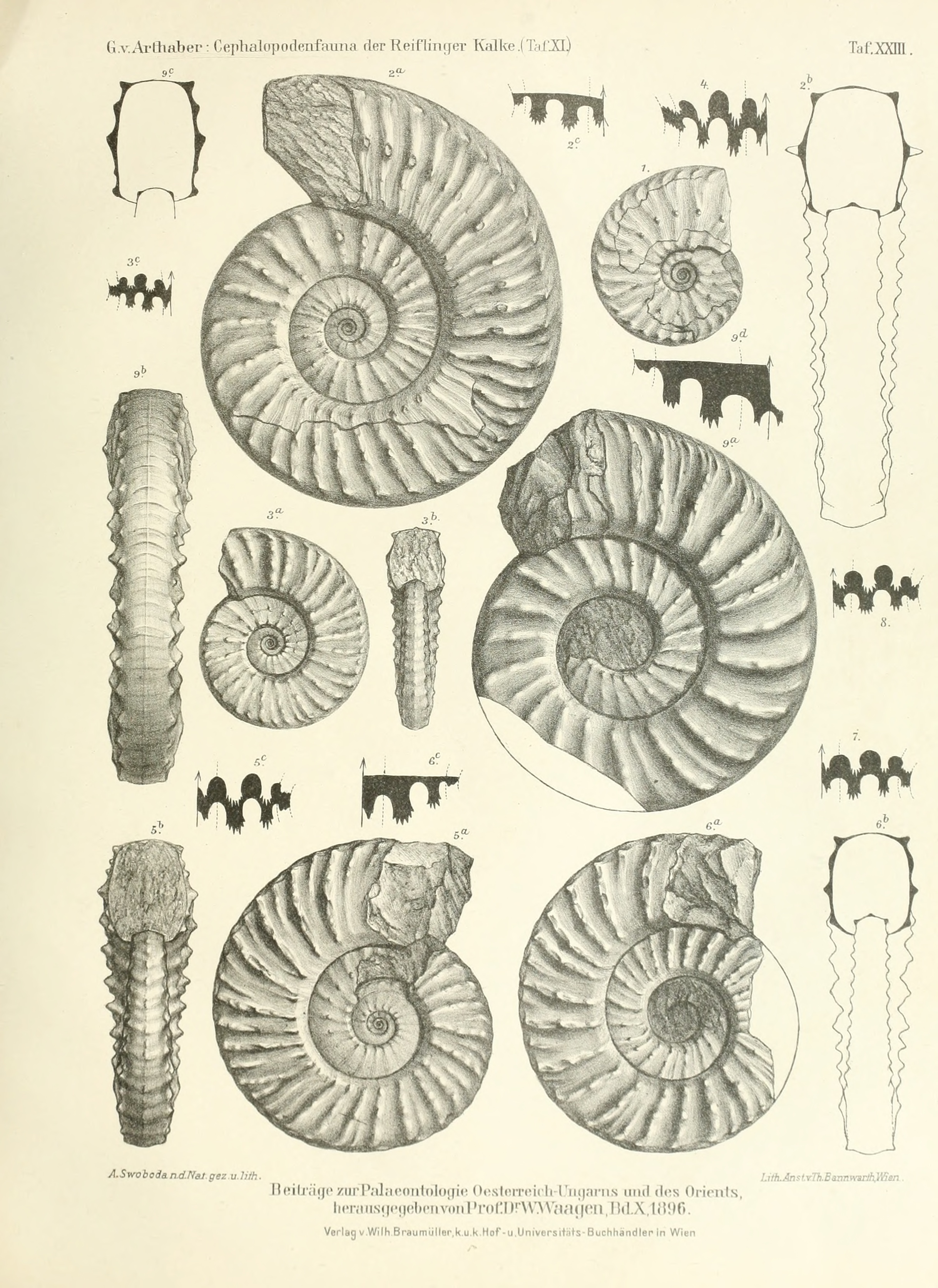
Ceratites and Balatonites, 1896

Balatonites is a genus of extinct cephalopods belonging to the ceratitid family Balatonitidae. There are at least four known species: B. balatonicus, B. oyama, B. shoshonensis, and B. zitteli.

The shell of Balatonites is essentially evolute, coiled with earlier whorls showing, and is laterally compressed with flattish sides and a roof-like venter. The sides are covered with radial ribs that have tubercles generally arranged in umbilical, median and ventral rows.

Balatonites has been found in Hungary, the Alps, Balkans, Germany, Japan, and Nevada.
