= Balkanites =

Balkanites Temporal range: Triassic

Scientific classification
- Kingdom: Animalia
- Phylum: Mollusca
- Class: Cephalopoda
- Subclass: Ammonoidea
- Order: Ceratitida
- Superfamily: Ceratitoidea
- Family: Tirolitidae
- Genus: Balkanites Ganev 1966

Genus of molluscs (fossil)

Balkanites is a genus of extinct ammonites (s.l.), belonging to the ceratitid superfamily Ceratitoidea and family Tirolitidae. It is restricted to the Triassic period. As common to the family, the shell is evolute with lateral tubercles. The suture is not elaborate.
