= Nannites =

Nannites Temporal range: Ladinian–Carnian

Scientific classification
- Domain: Eukaryota
- Kingdom: Animalia
- Phylum: Mollusca
- Class: Cephalopoda
- Subclass: †Ammonoidea
- Order: †Ceratitida
- Superfamily: †Danubitoidea
- Family: †Nannitidae
- Genus: †Nannites; Mojsisovics (1897)

Extinct genus of molluscs

Nannites is a genus in the ammonoid cephalopods in the order Ceratitida from the middle and upper Triassic (Ladinian and Carnian) of the Alps, named by Mojsisovics (1897). Nannites is the type genus of the Nannitidae which has been placed in the Danubitaceae. Previously the Nannitidae was included in the Ptychitaceae along with the Ptychitidae and, Isculitidae.

Nannites is very small, subglobose, generally evolute and smooth, with a rounded venter, and simple goniatitic sutures.
