= Biltnerites =

Biltnerites Temporal range: Lower Triassic

Scientific classification
- Kingdom: Animalia
- Phylum: Mollusca
- Class: Cephalopoda
- Subclass: Ammonoidea
- Order: Ceratitida
- Superfamily: Ceratitoidea
- Family: Tirolitidae
- Genus: Biltnerites Kittl, 1903

Genus of molluscs (fossil)

Biltnerites is a genus of ammonites (s.l.) from the lower Triassic included in the ceratitoidean family Tirolitidae of the order Ceratitida, characterized by a flat, evolute shell with moderately compressed, rounded whorls. The spinose stage characteristic of the Tirolitidae is absent, but the outer whorl does have indistinct ribs that cross the venter.

Biltnerites has been found in Lower Triassic sediments is S.E. Europe
