= Californites =

Californites Temporal range: Upper Triassic

Scientific classification
- Domain: Eukaryota
- Kingdom: Animalia
- Phylum: Mollusca
- Class: Cephalopoda
- Subclass: †Ammonoidea
- Order: †Ceratitida
- Family: †Clionitidae
- Genus: †Californites; Hyatt & Smith, 1905

Genus of molluscs (fossil)

Californites is a genus of the Upper Triassic clydonicoidean family Clionitidae with a discoidal, evolute shell and radial tuberculate ribs that end in strong ventrolateral spines. The whorl section is described as trapezoidal. The venter is low-arched, smooth, and has a strong but narrow median groove.

Californites comes from the Carnian of California.
