= Lecanites =

Lecanites Temporal range: M Trias (Ladin) - U Trias (Carn)

Scientific classification
- Missing taxonomy template (fix): Lecanites

Genus of molluscs (fossil)

Lecanites is a ceratitid genus assigned to the Danubitoidea, with an essentially smooth, evolute, discoidal shell and a goniatitic suture with many elements. It is the type and now only genus of the Lecanitidae.

Previously, according to the Treatise Part L, Lecanites and Badiotites were included together in the Lecanitidae which then was part of the Clydonitaceae. Since then (Tozer 1981) Badiotites was reassigned to the new family Badiotitidae which is included in the Ceratitoidea and Lecanites and Lecanitidae put to the Danubitoidea.

Lecanites was named by Mojsisovics in 1882. It has been found in the middle and upper Triassic of California, Nevada, Idaho, China, and Italy.
