= Acanthinites =

Acanthinites Temporal range: Norian

Scientific classification
- Domain: Eukaryota
- Kingdom: Animalia
- Phylum: Mollusca
- Class: Cephalopoda
- Subclass: †Ammonoidea
- Order: †Ceratitida
- Superfamily: †Clydonitoidea
- Family: †Tibetitidae
- Genus: †Acanthinites; Mojsisovics 1893

Genus of molluscs (fossil)

Acanthinites is a genus of extinct cephalopods belonging to the ammonoid order Ceratitida described by Mojsisovics in 1893 who established the type species of the group as Acanthinites excelsus. The Shell is involute, compressed; sides arched, converging on narrow venter with a central furrow bordered by low serrated keels. Flanks are covered by numerous spiral rows of tubercles.

Acanthinites has been found in the Alps, Himalayas, and Timor, and in the case of A. magnificus British Columbia in western Canada. Its fossils are found in the Norian stage of the Triassic Period, which lasted from about 216.5 to 203.6 million years ago.

Acanthinites was previously included in the Certopleuitidae of the Clydonitaceae but now in the closely related Tibetitidae with certopleutids reduced to an included subfamily.

Related genera include Cyrtopleurites, and Himavites.
