= Ceccaceras =

Ceccaceras Temporal range: 247.2–242.0 Ma

Scientific classification
- Domain: Eukaryota
- Kingdom: Animalia
- Phylum: Mollusca
- Class: Cephalopoda
- Subclass: †Ammonoidea
- Order: †Ceratitida
- Family: †Ceratitidae
- Subfamily: †Paraceratitinae
- Genus: †Ceccaceras; Monnet and Bucher, 2005

Species
- †Ceccaceras stecki Monnet and Bucher, 2005

Genus of molluscs (fossil)

Ceccaceras is an extinct genus of ammonites in the family Ceratitidae. Species are known from the Triassic of United States (Nevada).
