= Dieneria =

Dieneria Temporal range: Late Triassic

Scientific classification
- Kingdom: Animalia
- Phylum: Mollusca
- Class: Cephalopoda
- Subclass: †Ammonoidea
- Order: †Ceratitida
- Family: †Klamathitidae
- Genus: †Dieneria; Hyatt & Smith, 1905

Genus of molluscs (fossil)

Dieneria is a genus of ceratitid ammonoid cephalopods from the Late Triassic of western North America with a smooth discoidal shall of which the venter is truncate and the suture simple. Only the first lateral lobe is slightly serrated, the other lobes entire (smooth)

Dieneria, named by Hyatt and Smith, 1905, was first found in the Carnian of California and is now also known from British Columbia. According to the American Treatise Part L, 1957, Dieneria belongs to the Carnitidae, a component family of the Ceratitoidea. Subsequently, Dieneria was reassigned to the Klamathitidae Tozer, 1994, included in the Pinacoceratoidea.
