= Beyrichites =

Beyrichites Temporal range: M Triassic

Scientific classification
- Kingdom: Animalia
- Phylum: Mollusca
- Class: Cephalopoda
- Subclass: Ammonoidea
- Order: Ceratitida
- Superfamily: Ceratitoidea
- Family: Beyrichitidae
- Genus: Beyrichites Waagen, 1895

Genus of molluscs (fossil)

Beyrichites is an extinct genus in the ammonoids cephalopod, order Ceratitida from the Lower and Middle Triassic of southern Europe, Asia, and western North America.

Beyrichites has an involute, discoidal shell with a narrowly arched venter and sigmoidal ribbing that tends to disappear on the outer whorl. The suture is subammonitic, meaning the saddles are serrate as well as the lobes.

Two subgenera are recognized: B. (Beyrichites) from the Lower and Middle Triassic, which has no tubercles, and B. (Gangadharites) from the Middle Triassic of the Himalaya which has tubercles on the whorl sides.
