= Israelites (ammonite) =

Israelites Temporal range: Triassic

Scientific classification
- Domain: Eukaryota
- Kingdom: Animalia
- Phylum: Mollusca
- Class: Cephalopoda
- Subclass: †Ammonoidea
- Order: †Ceratitida
- Family: †Hungaritidae
- Genus: †Israelites; Parnes, 1962

Type species
- Israelites ramonensis

Extinct Triassic period genus of ammonoids

Israelites is an extinct genus of ammonoid from the Triassic period. Its type species is I. ramonensis.

== Distribution ==
Fossils of I. ramonensis are known from Spain and Israel.
