= Sibiritidae =

Sibiritidae Temporal range: early Triassic

Scientific classification
- Kingdom: Animalia
- Phylum: Mollusca
- Class: Cephalopoda
- Subclass: †Ammonoidea
- Order: †Ceratitida
- Superfamily: †Ceratitoidea
- Family: †Sibiritidae; Mojsisovics, 1896

Extinct family of ammonites

Sibiritidae constitutes a family of ceratitid ammonites described in the Treatise, Part L, 1957, as ribbed or tuberculate derivatives of Meekoceratidae with modification of the venter from mere widening and transverse ribbing to sulcation (being grooved).

The Sibiritidae have been removed from the Noritoidea where 8 genera were included to the Ceratitoidea with some 14 genera within three defined subfamilies, as indicated.

Keyserlingitinae

Goricanites
Olenekoceras
Pseudokeyserlingites
Subolenekites

Olenikitinae

Kazakhstanites
Olenikites
Prohungarites
Pseudosvalbardiceras
Svalbardiceras
Timoceras
Tjururpites

Silberlingitinae

Silberlingites
