= Goricanites =

Goricanites Temporal range: Early Triassic

Scientific classification
- Kingdom: Animalia
- Phylum: Mollusca
- Class: Cephalopoda
- Subclass: †Ammonoidea
- Order: †Ceratitida
- Family: †Sibiritidae
- Subfamily: †Keyserlingitinae
- Genus: †Goricanites; Guex, et al, 2005

Genus of molluscs (fossil)

Goricanites is a ceratitid ammonoid cephalopod known only from the Lower Triassic Union Wash formation of California (USA). This fossil is included in the family Sibiritidae and subfamily Keyserlingitinae
