= Hungaritidae =

Hungaritidae Temporal range: Middle Triassic

Scientific classification
- Domain: Eukaryota
- Kingdom: Animalia
- Phylum: Mollusca
- Class: Cephalopoda
- Subclass: †Ammonoidea
- Order: †Ceratitida
- Superfamily: †Ceratitoidea
- Family: †Hungaritidae; Waagen, 1895

Genera
- See text

Extinct family of ammonites

The Hungaritidae comprises a family of ceratitid ammonites described in the Treatise,(Arkell et al. 1957), as involute compressed, discoidal, with keeled or sharpened venter, smooth to weakly costate. Sutures ceratitid, usually with numerous elements.

Hungaritids are Middle Triassic in age spanning a range from about 247 Ma to 235 Ma. As of October 2024, the Paleobiology Database accepted nine genera:

Bullatihungarites
Gevanites
Hungarites, type genus
Iberites
Israelites
Negebites
Nodihungarites
Paraceratitoides
Perrinoceras

Arkell, et al. 1957, in Part L of the original treatise lists instead: Hungarites, Noetlingites, Longobardites, Neodalmanites, Groenlandites, Perrinoceras, Arctohungarites, Dalmanites, and Prohungarites. Only two have remained, Hungarites and Perrinoceras. Longobardites has been removed as type genus for the Longobarditidae, along with Arctohungarites, Groenlandites, and Noetlingites.
