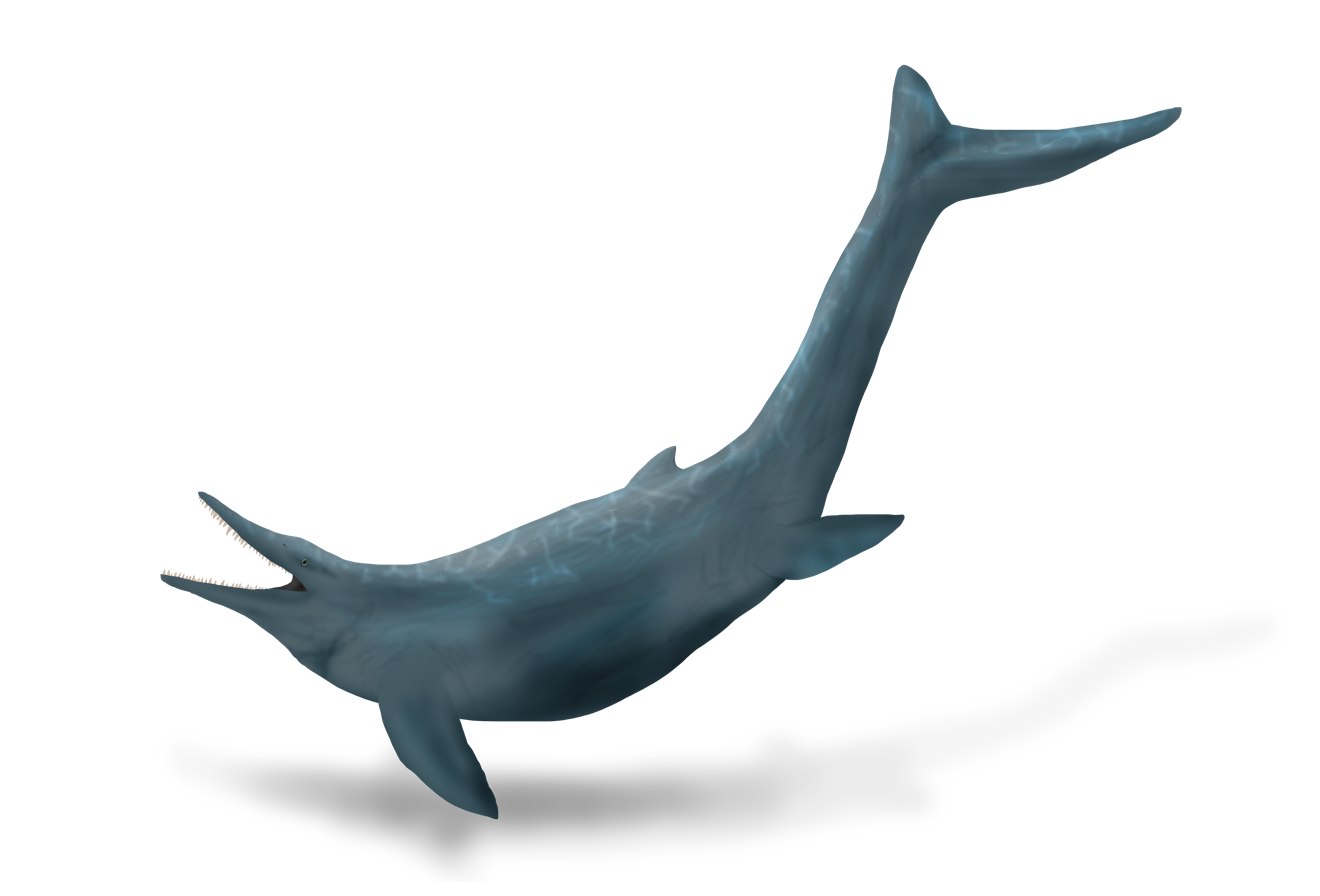
- Life reconstruction of Himalayasaurus tibetensis

Scientific classification
- Kingdom: Animalia
- Phylum: Chordata
- Class: Reptilia
- Order: †Ichthyosauria
- Family: †Shastasauridae
- Genus: †Himalayasaurus; Dong, 1972

Type species
- †Himalayasaurus tibetensis Dong, 1972

= Himalayasaurus =

Himalayasaurus Temporal range: Late Triassic, 215.56–212.0 Ma

Extinct genus of reptiles

Fossil vertebra, National Natural History Museum of China

Himalayasaurus is an extinct genus of ichthyosaur from the Late Triassic Qulonggongba Formation of Tibet. The type species Himalayasaurus tibetensis was described in 1972 on the basis of fragmentary remains, including teeth, limb bones, and vertebrae. The entire body length of Himalayasaurus is estimated to have been over 15 metres (49 ft) in length. Himalayasaurus has since been considered a nomen dubium or "dubious name" because of the lack of features that set it apart from other ichthyosaurs, although the presence of distinct cutting edges on its teeth have more recently been proposed as a unique feature of the genus (cutting edges have also been found in the ichthyosaur Thalattoarchon from the western United States). Himalayasaurus belongs to the family Shastasauridae, which includes other large-bodied Triassic ichthyosaurs like Shonisaurus.

== See also ==
- List of ichthyosaurs
- Timeline of ichthyosaur research
