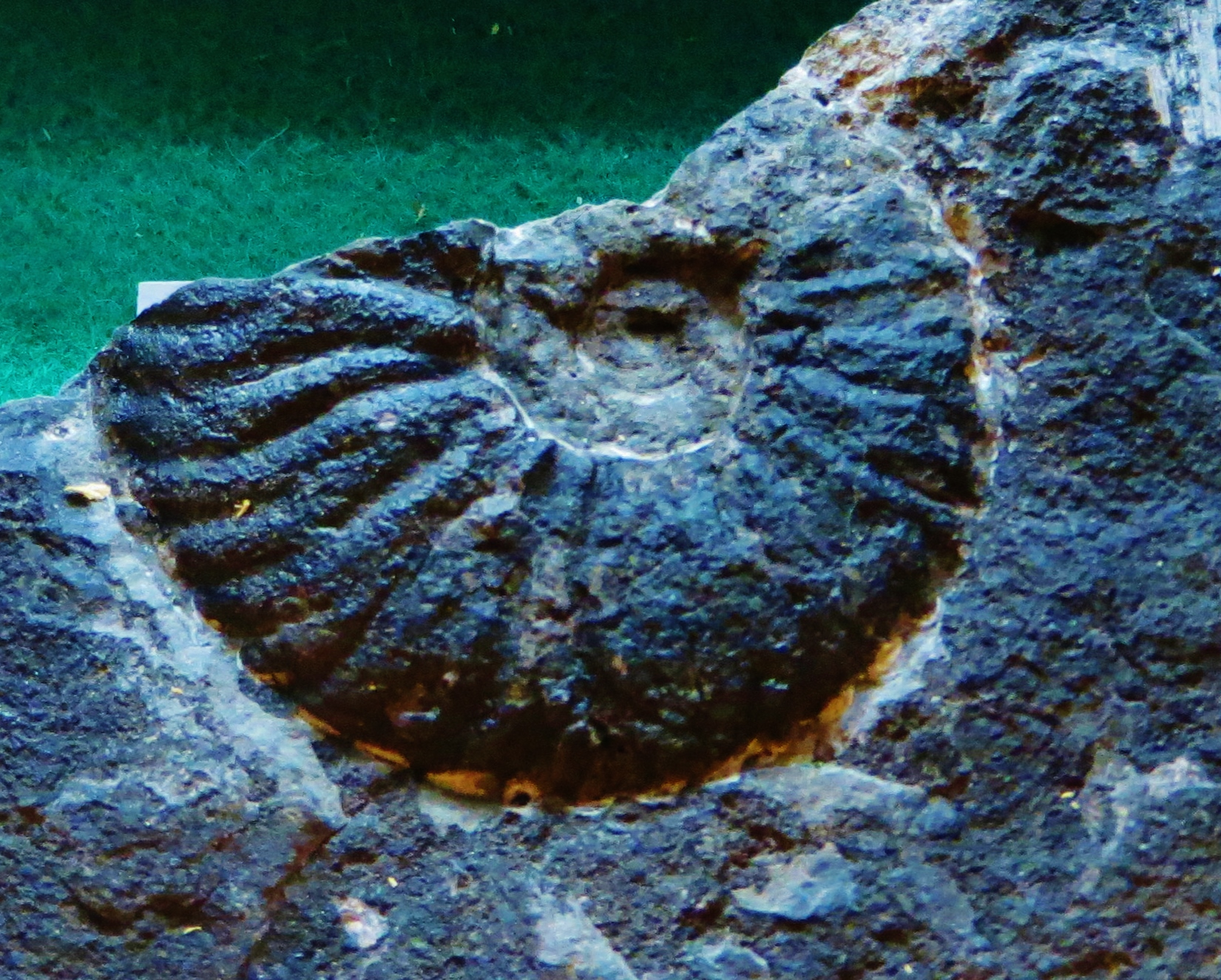
- Chieseiceras chiesense

Scientific classification
- Kingdom: Animalia
- Phylum: Mollusca
- Class: Cephalopoda
- Subclass: †Ammonoidea
- Order: †Ceratitida
- Family: †Ceratitidae
- Subfamily: †Nevaditinae
- Genus: †Chieseiceras; Brack and Rieber, 1986

Species
- †Chieseiceras chiesense

= Chieseiceras =

Chieseiceras Temporal range: 242.0–235.0 Ma

Genus of molluscs (fossil)

Chieseiceras is an extinct genus of ammonites in the family of Ceratitidae. Species are known from the Triassic of Hungary, Italy and Switzerland.
