= Velebites =

Velebites Temporal range: Middle Triassic

Scientific classification
- Domain: Eukaryota
- Kingdom: Animalia
- Phylum: Mollusca
- Class: Cephalopoda
- Subclass: †Ammonoidea
- Order: †Ceratitida
- Family: †Aplococeratidae
- Genus: †Velebites; Sapolek, 1918

Genus of molluscs (fossil)

Velebites is a genus of middle Triassic ammonites from the Balkans belonging to the Aplococeratidae, a family within the Ceratitida. It is somewhat similar to Aplococeras in external form. The shell is evolute, discoidal with convex converging whorl sides and rounded venter. Ribs are more recurved than in Aplococeras and the suture is ceratitic rather than goniatitic.
