= Clionitidae =

Clionitidae Temporal range: Upper Triassic

Scientific classification
- Kingdom: Animalia
- Phylum: Mollusca
- Class: Cephalopoda
- Subclass: †Ammonoidea
- Order: †Ceratitida
- Superfamily: †Clydonitoidea
- Family: †Clionitidae; Arbu, 1932

Clionitidae is a family of generally evolute, Upper Triassic, ammonoids with a ventral furrow usually bordered by rows of tubercles and whorl sides ornamented by sigmoidal ribs which may bear spiral rows of tubercles. The suture is ceratitic.

The Clionitidae belong to the Ceratitida and are included in the superfamily Clydonitoidea. Their fossils have been found in Carnian and/or Norian sediments in California, Nevada British Columbia, the Alps, Balkans, Himalaya, and on Timor.

Among its genera are Clionites, Alloclionites, Californites, and Traskites
