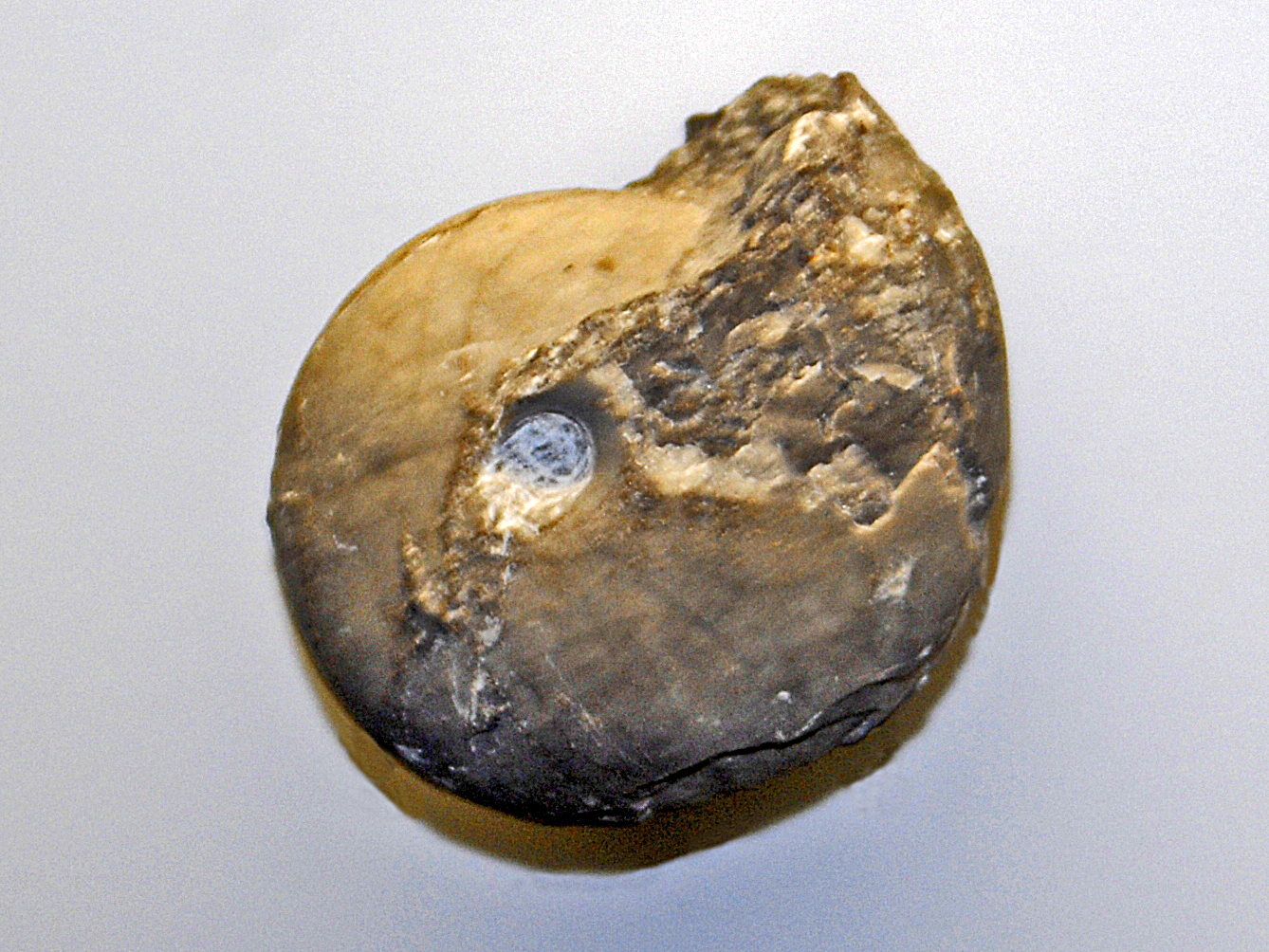
- Fossil specimen of Arcestes species from Mid Triassic, Dossena (Bergamo)

Scientific classification
- Kingdom: Animalia
- Phylum: Mollusca
- Class: Cephalopoda
- Subclass: †Ammonoidea
- Order: †Ceratitida
- Family: †Arcestidae; Mojsisovics 1875

= Arcestidae =

Arcestidae Temporal range: Middle Triassic–Upper Triassic

Extinct family of molluscs

Arcestidae is an extinct family of ammonite cephalopods.

Fossils of Arcestidae are found in the Triassic marine strata throughout the world, including Austria, Canada, Georgia, Hungary, Indonesia, Iran, Israel, Mexico, Nepal, New Zealand, Oman, Papua New Guinea, Romania, Russia, Slovenia, Turkey, Ukraine, United States.

== Genera and species ==
- Anisarcestes † Kittl 1908
- Arcestes † Suess 1865
  - Arcestes andersoni † Hyatt and Smith 1905
  - Arcestes intuslabiatus † Mojsisovics 1873
  - Arcestes megaphyllus † Beyrich 1864
  - Arcestes priscus † Waagen 1879
  - Arcestes syngonus † Mojsisovics 1873
- Stenarcestes † Mojsisovics 1896
  - Stenarcestes leiostracus † Mojsisovics 1875
