= Alloceratites =

Alloceratites Temporal range: M Triassic

Scientific classification
- Domain: Eukaryota
- Kingdom: Animalia
- Phylum: Mollusca
- Class: Cephalopoda
- Subclass: †Ammonoidea
- Order: †Ceratitida
- Family: †Ceratitidae
- Subfamily: †Ceratitinae
- Genus: †Alloceratites; Spath, 1934

Genus of molluscs (fossil)

Alloceratites is a genus of ammonoid cephalopods from the Middle Triassic of Germany included in the family Ceratitidae.

The mature shell of Alloceratites has strong, well spaced lateral tubercles and clavi (nodes) along either side of the venter. Ribbing between tubercles is indistinct. The suture is ceratitic.
