= Keyserlingitinae =

Keyserlingitinae Temporal range: Early Triassic

Scientific classification
- Kingdom: Animalia
- Phylum: Mollusca
- Class: Cephalopoda
- Subclass: †Ammonoidea
- Order: †Ceratitida
- Family: †Sibiritidae
- Subfamily: †Keyserlingitinae; Zacharov, 1970

Genera
- See text

Extinct subfamily of molluscs

Keyserlingitinae is a subfamily of the Sibiritidae, Early Triassic Ammonoidea. Shells tend to have subquadrate whorl sections as in Durgaites and Kyserlingites and to be strongly ribbed or nodose or both.

== Genera ==
The Keyserlingitinae includes

- Kyserlingites
- Durgaites
- Goricanites
- Olenekoceras
- Pseudokeyserlingites
- Subolenekites
