= Anisarcestes =

Scientific classification
- Domain: Eukaryota
- Kingdom: Animalia
- Phylum: Mollusca
- Class: Cephalopoda
- Subclass: †Ammonoidea
- Order: †Ceratitida
- Family: †Arcestidae
- Genus: †Anisarcestes

Genus of molluscs (fossil)

Anisarcestes is an extinct genus of cephalopod belonging to the Ammonite subclass.
