= Alloclionites =

Alloclionites Temporal range: Norian

Scientific classification
- Domain: Eukaryota
- Kingdom: Animalia
- Phylum: Mollusca
- Class: Cephalopoda
- Subclass: †Ammonoidea
- Order: †Ceratitida
- Family: †Clionitidae
- Genus: †Alloclionites; Spath, 1951

Genus of molluscs (fossil)

Alloclionites is a genus of extinct ammonoid cephalopods within the family Clionitidae which is part of the ceratitid superfamily Clydonitoidea. Alloclionites comes from the Upper Triassic of the Alps, Balkans, Himalayas, Timor, and British Columbia and is recognized by its many tubercles which tend to diminish on the body chamber.
