= Danubitoidea =

Danubitoidea Temporal range: Triassic

Scientific classification
- Domain: Eukaryota
- Kingdom: Animalia
- Phylum: Mollusca
- Class: Cephalopoda
- Subclass: †Ammonoidea
- Order: †Ceratitida
- Superfamily: †Danubitoidea; Spath, 1951

Families
- See text

Synonyms
- Danubitaceae

Extinct superfamily of molluscs

The Danubitoidea is a large and diverse superfamily in the order Ceratitida of the Ammonoidea that combines five families removed from the Ceratitaceae, Clydonitaceae, and Ptychitaceae.

== Taxonomy ==
Superfamily Danubitoidea

- Family Aplococeratidae
- Family Danubitidae
- Family Lecanitidae
- Family Longobarditidae
- Family Nannitidae

The largest family in the Danubitoidea is the Longobarditidae with 11 genera distributed among three subfamilies plus three of undetermined placement. Smallest families are the Lecanitidae and Nannitidae, each represented by a single genus.

== Distribution and range ==
Fossils of the Danubitoidea have been found in the Triassic of Afghanistan, Russia, China, Papua New Guinea; Italy, Switzerland, Hungary; British Columbia, Yukon, Nunavut; Idaho, Nevada, and California.
