= Myophoria =

Myophoria Temporal range: Triassic

Scientific classification
- Kingdom: Animalia
- Phylum: Mollusca
- Class: Bivalvia
- Order: Trigoniida
- Family: †Myophoriidae
- Genus: †Myophoria; Bronn, 1834

Extinct genus of bivalves

Myophoria is an extinct genus of bivalve mollusk from Europe belonging to the family Myophoriidae. Fossils are mainly found in Triassic rocks (251 to 200 mya).

== Description ==
The shells of the species in this genus are triangular, with prominent ribs radiating from the apex and fine growth lines.

== Species ==
- Myophoria adornata
- Myophoria beringiana
- Myophoria brockensis
- Myophoria cairnesi
- Myophoria chenopus
- Myophoria decussata
- Myophoria ebbae
- Myophoria gaytani
- Myophoria harpa
- Myophoria humboldtensis
- Myophoria kuuoruensis
- Myophoria lineata
- Myophoria ornata
- Myophoria proharpa
- Myophoria reziae
- Myophoria staggi
- Myophoria transversa
- Myophoria zeballos
