= Anisian =

Stage of the Triassic

- 247.0 – 241.464 ± 0.28 Ma
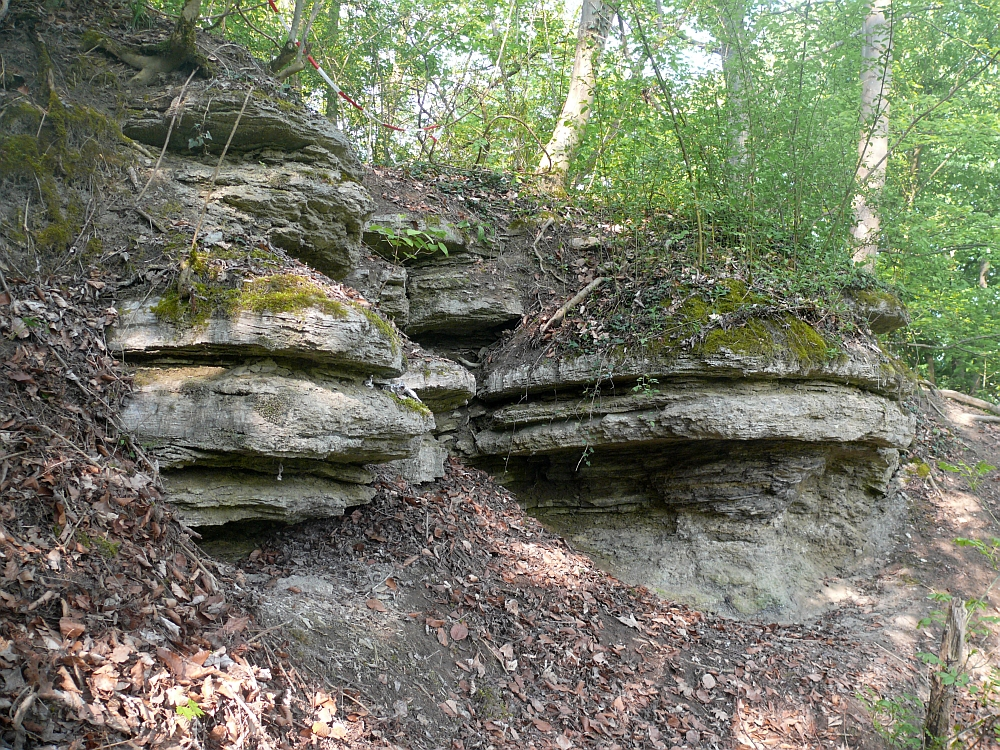
- The Muschelkalk in Europe is mainly Anisian aged

Chronology
← / Triassic–Jurassic extinction event; ← / Scleractinian corals & calcified sponges; ← / Carnian pluvial episode; ← / Manicouagan impact; ← / Coals return; ← / Full recovery of woody trees; ← / Smithian–Spathian boundary event; ← / Permian-Triassic extinction event
Subdivision of the Triassic according to the ICS, as of 2024. Vertical axis scale: Millions of years ago

Etymology
- Name formality: Formal

Usage information
- Celestial body: Earth
- Regional usage: Global (ICS)
- Time scale(s) used: ICS Time Scale

Definition
- Chronological unit: Age
- Stratigraphic unit: Stage
- Time span formality: Formal
- Lower boundary definition: Not formally defined
- Lower boundary definition candidates: FAD of the Conodont Chiosella timorensis; Base of magnetic zone MT1n
- Lower boundary GSSP candidate section(s): Desli Caira, Northern Dobruja, Romania; Guandao, Guizhou, China
- Upper boundary definition: FAD of the Ammonite Eoprotrachyceras curionii
- Upper boundary GSSP: Bagolino, Lombardian pre-Alps, Italy; 45.8193°N 10.4710°E
- Upper GSSP ratified: 2005

In the geologic timescale, the Anisian is the lower stage or earliest age of the Middle Triassic series or epoch and lasted from 247 million years ago until 241.464 million years ago. The Anisian Age succeeds the Olenekian Age (part of the Lower Triassic Epoch) and precedes the Ladinian Age.

== Stratigraphic definitions ==
The stage and its name were established by Austrian geologists Wilhelm Heinrich Waagen and Carl Diener in 1895. The name comes from Anisus, the Latin name of the river Enns. The original type locality is at Großreifling in the Austrian state of Styria.

The base of the Anisian Stage (also the base of the Middle Triassic series) is sometimes laid at the first appearance of conodont species Chiosella timorensis in the stratigraphic record. Other stratigraphers prefer to use the base of magnetic chronozone MT1n. There is no accepted global reference profile for the base, but one (GSSP or golden spike) was proposed at a flank of the mountain Deșli Caira in the Romanian Dobruja.

The top of the Anisian (the base of the Ladinian) is at the first appearance of ammonite species Eoprotrachyceras curionii and the ammonite family Trachyceratidae. The conodont species Neogondolella praehungarica appears at the same level.

Especially in Central Europe the Anisian Stage is sometimes subdivided into four substages: Aegean, Bythinian, Pelsonian and Illyrian.

The Anisian contains six ammonite biozones:

- zone of Nevadites
- zone of Hungarites
- zone of Paraceratites
- zone of Balatonites balatonicus
- zone of Kocaelia
- zone of Acrochordiceras

== Selected formations ==
- Sydney sandstone (New South Wales, Australia)
- Wianamatta Group – Bringelly Shale, Ashfield Shale (New South Wales, Australia)
- Lower and middle Besano Formation (Switzerland and Italy)
- Upper Ermaying Formation (Shaanxi and Shanxi, China)
- Favret Formation / Prida Formation (Fossil Hill Member) (Nevada, US)
- Grès à Voltzia (France)
- Guanling Formation (Guizhou and Yunnan, China)
- Moenkopi Formation (Holbrook and Anton Chico members) (SW US)
- Lower and Middle Muschelkalk (central Europe)
- Röt Formation / Upper Buntsandstein (Germany)

== Sources ==
- Brack, P.; Rieber, H.; Nicora, A. & Mundil, R.; 2005: The Global boundary Stratotype Section and Point (GSSP) of the Ladinian Stage (Middle Triassic) at Bagolino (Southern Alps, Northern Italy) and its implications for the Triassic time scale, Episodes 28(4), pp. 233–244.
- Grădinaru, E.; Orchard, M.J.; Nicora, A.; Gallet, Y.; Besse, J.; Krystyn, L.; Sobolev, E.S.; Atudorei, N.-V. & Ivanova, D.; 2007: The Global Boundary Stratotype Section and Point (GSSP) for the base of the Anisian Stage: Deşli Caira Hill, North Dobrogea, Romania, Albertiana 36, pp. 54–71.
- Gradstein, F.M.; Ogg, J.G. & Smith, A.G.; 2004: A Geologic Time Scale 2004, Cambridge University Press.
