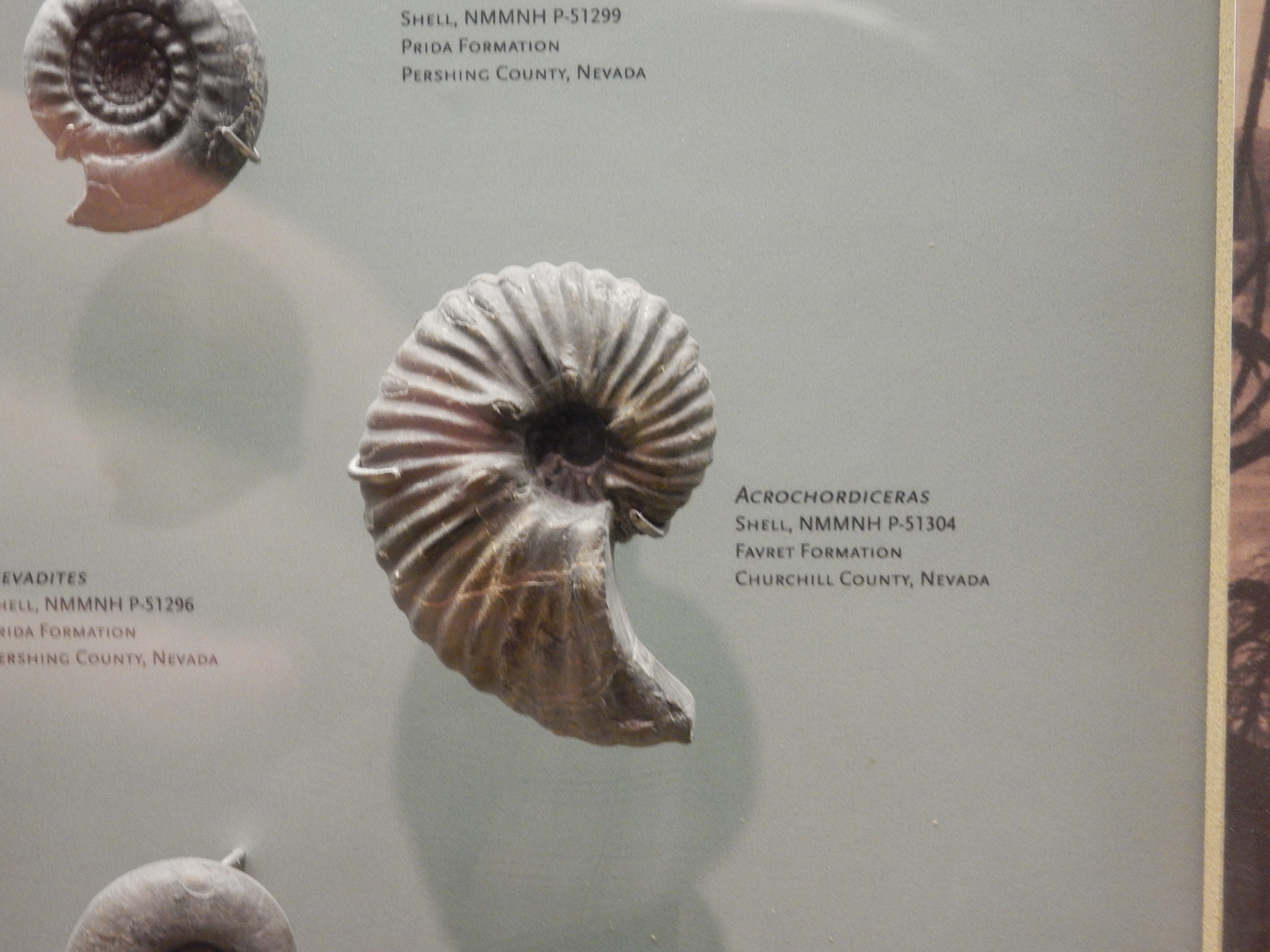
- Acrochordiceras fossil at the New Mexico Museum of Natural History and Science

Scientific classification
- Domain: Eukaryota
- Kingdom: Animalia
- Phylum: Mollusca
- Class: Cephalopoda
- Subclass: †Ammonoidea
- Order: †Ceratitida
- Superfamily: †Ceratitoidea
- Family: †Acrochordiceratidae
- Genus: †Acrochordiceras; Hyatt, 1877

= Acrochordiceras =

Acrochordiceras Temporal range: M Triassic

Genus of molluscs (fossil)

Acrochordiceras is a genus of Middle Triassic ammonoid cephalopods belonging to the ceratitid family Acrochordiceratidae, included in the superfamily Ceratitoidea.

The shell of Acrochordiceras, as with the family, is more or less involute with strong, almost transverse, ribs that cross the arched venter uninterrupted. The ventral lobe is bifid. The first lateral lobe is larger than the other and is multi-pronged. Prongs on subsequent smaller lobes are less developed and saddles are small and rounded.

Acrochordiceras was described by Hyatt in 1877 and is known from Eurasia, Timur, California and Nevada.
