= Anatomites =

Scientific classification
- Kingdom: Animalia
- Phylum: Mollusca
- Class: Cephalopoda
- Subclass: †Ammonoidea
- Genus: †Anatomites

Genus of molluscs (fossil)

Anatomites is an extinct genus of cephalopod belonging to the Ammonite subclass.
