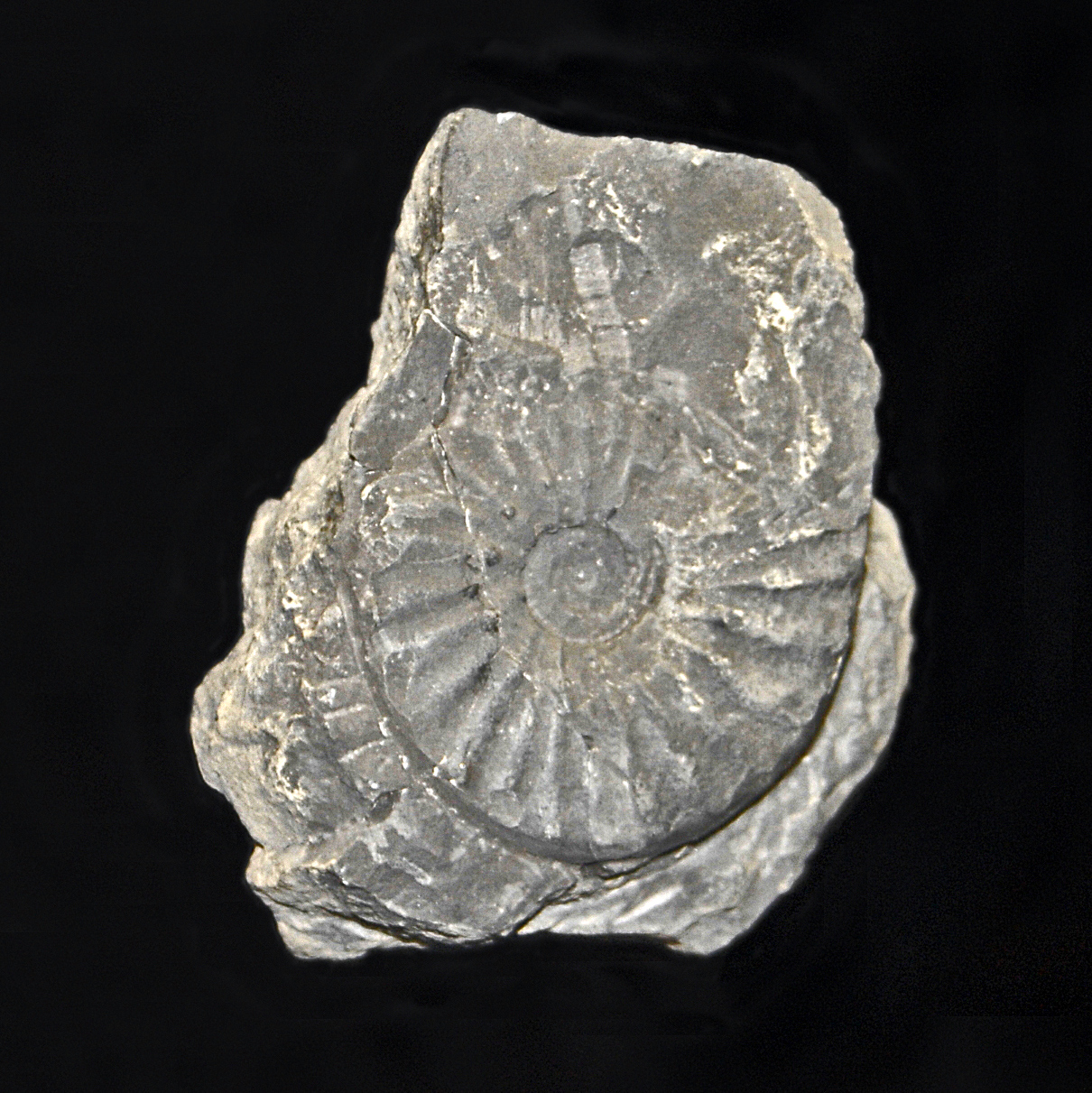
- Paraceratites subnodosus from Triassic – Lenna (Italy)

Scientific classification
- Kingdom: Animalia
- Phylum: Mollusca
- Class: Cephalopoda
- Subclass: †Ammonoidea
- Order: †Ceratitida
- Family: †Ceratitidae
- Subfamily: †Paraceratitinae
- Genus: †Paraceratites; Hyatt, 1900

= Paraceratites =

Paraceratites Temporal range: Triassic 247.2–235.0 Ma

Genus of molluscs (fossil)

Paraceratites is an extinct genus of ammonite cephalopods in the family Ceratitidae.

== Species ==
- Paraceratites gabbi † Meek 1877
- Paraceratites binodosus † Hauer 1850
- Paraceratites brembanus † Mojsisovics 1882
- Paraceratites elegans † Mojsisovics 1882
- Paraceratites orientalis † Yabe and Shimizu 1927
- Paraceratites stecki † Silberling and Nichols 1982
- Paraceratites subnodosus † Mojsisovics 1882
- Paraceratites trinodosus † Mojsisovics 1882

== Distribution ==
Fossils of Paraceratites are found in the Triassic marine strata throughout the world, including Bulgaria, Cambodia, China, Germany, Israel, Italy, Japan, Laos, Malaysia, Montenegro, Papua New Guinea, Russia, Serbia, Turkey, United States and Vietnam.
