= Longobarditidae =

Longobarditidae Temporal range: Early Triassic

Scientific classification
- Domain: Eukaryota
- Kingdom: Animalia
- Phylum: Mollusca
- Class: Cephalopoda
- Subclass: †Ammonoidea
- Order: †Ceratitida
- Superfamily: †Danubitoidea
- Family: †Longobarditidae; Spath, 1951

Subfamilies
- See text

Extinct family of molluscs

Longobarditidae is a family of ceratitd ammonoids known from the early Triassic, included in the Danubitaceae. Longobarditidae includes genera formerly placed in Hungaritidae by the American Treatise on Invertebrate Paleontology, Part L, 1957 as well as genera that have been described since.

== Taxonomy ==
Longobarditidae includes 17 genera, 16 distributed among 4 subfamilies plus one unassigned. Six genera were named prior to the first publication of part L of the Treatise on Invertebrate Paleontology in 1957, the remaining 11 since. Arctohungerites, Groenlandites, Longobardites, and Noetingites were previously included in the Hungeritidae, Czekanowskites in the Meekoceritidae, and Pearylandites in the Siberitidae

Fm. Longobarditidae

- Gen Azarianites

- Subfm. Czekanowskitinae

- Gen. Arctohungerites
- Gen. Czekanowskites
- Gen. Stannakhites
- Gen. Tetsaoceras

- Subfm. Groenlanditinae

- Gen. Groenlandites
- Gen. Lenotropites
- Gen. Pearylandites

- Subfm. Longobarditinae

- Gen. Grambergia
- Gen. Intornites
- Gen. Longobardites
- Gen. Longobarditoides
- Gen. Oxylongobardites
- Gen. Subhungarites

- Subfm. Noetlingitinae

- Gen. Noetlingites
- Gen. Pronoetlingites
- Gen. Silberlingeria
