= Bacchites =

Bacchites Temporal range: Middle Triassic (Carnian)

Scientific classification
- Kingdom: Animalia
- Phylum: Mollusca
- Class: Cephalopoda
- Subclass: †Ammonoidea
- Order: †Ceratitida
- Family: †Juvavitidae
- Genus: †Bacchites; Smith, 1927

Genus of molluscs (fossil)

Bacchites is a genus of extinct ammonoid cephalopods belonging to the ceratitid family Juvavitidae.

Bacchites, named by Smith, 1927, has a subspherical shell with the closed umbilicus, the surface of which is almost smooth except for faint transverse ribs, vestigial constrictions, and a faint threadlike keel. The suture is ammonitic. This genus, previously included in the Haloritidae, was removed to the Jovavitidae, established by Tozer, 1971, which is based on the genus Jovites. Both families are included in the Tropicaceae.

Bacchites has been found in upper Middle Triassic (Carnian) age sediments in the Alps, Timor, and California.
