= Apleuroceras =

Apleuroceras Temporal range: Ladinian

Scientific classification
- Domain: Eukaryota
- Kingdom: Animalia
- Phylum: Mollusca
- Class: Cephalopoda
- Subclass: †Ammonoidea
- Order: †Ceratitida
- Family: †Aplococeratidae
- Genus: †Apleuroceras; Hyatt, 1900

Species
- See text

Genus of molluscs (fossil)

Apleuroceras is a genus of ceratitid ammonites with an essentially smooth evolute shell with a subquadrade whorl section and a ceratitic suture with two lateral lobes (on either side). Apleuroceras belongs to the Aplococeratidae and has been found in middle Triassic formations of Ladinian age in Hungary and the Alps.
