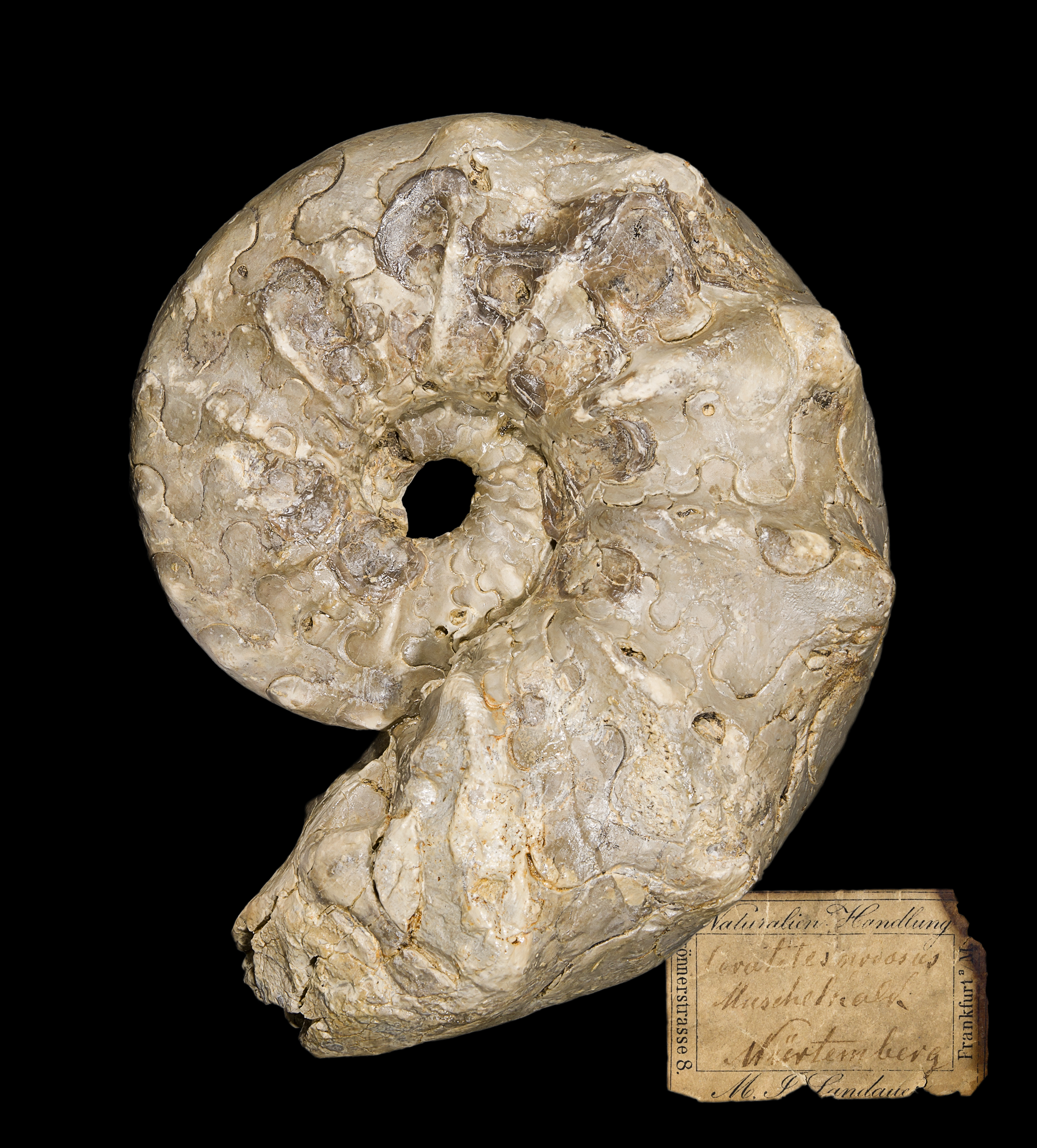
- Ceratites nodosus, Upper Muschelkalk - Germany

Scientific classification
- Kingdom: Animalia
- Phylum: Mollusca
- Class: Cephalopoda
- Subclass: †Ammonoidea
- Order: †Ceratitida
- Family: †Ceratitidae
- Subfamily: †Ceratitinae
- Genus: †Ceratites de Haan, 1825

Species
- Ceratites robustus; Ceratites compressus; Ceratites evolutus; Ceratites spinosus; Ceratites postspinosus; Ceratites enodis; Ceratites sublaevigatus; Ceratites nodosus; Ceratites weyeri; Ceratites dorsoplanus; Ceratites semipartitus

= Ceratites =

Ceratites Temporal range: Triassic, 242.5–239 Ma

Genus of molluscs (fossil)

Ceratites is an extinct genus of ammonoid cephalopods. These nektonic carnivores lived in marine habitats in what is now Europe, during the Triassic, from the upper-most Anisian to the lower Ladinian age.

== Description ==
This ammonoid has a ceratitic suture pattern on its shell (smooth lobes and frilly saddles). Evolution of the frilly saddles is thought to be due to increased pressure on the shell, at greater depth. The frilly pattern would increase the strength of the shell and allow Ceratites to dive deeper, possibly in search of food.

== Distribution ==
Fossils of this genus are only known from the Germanic Basin, which formed a partially isolated shallow sea across much of Europe from eastern France north of the future Alps and into Poland, separated from the Tethys by 3 gates that variably opened. The salinity of the water in this partially isolated basin may have been one of the main factors keeping ammonoid and brachiopod diversity low in this basin, with species of the genus Ceratites and two species of the nautiloid Germanonautilus being the only endemic cephalopods known from this basin, apart from occasional individuals of ammonoid species found in the Tethys that may have accidentally entered during stronger marine incursions into the basin.

Following the hyper saline Mittlerer Muschelkalk unit with its frequent evaporite deposits, a renewed opening of some of the gates to the Tethys brought full marine incursions that initially saw the arrival of mass occurrences of the crinoid Encrinus liliiformis captured by the often massive Trochitenkalk units at the base of the oberer Muschelkalk. Paraceratites (Pogonoceratites) atavus/flexuosus was (or were depending on whether the two forms represent two species or sexual dimorphism of a single species) the initial colonizer who arrived from the Tethys. These forms locally persisted and became regionally common. The genus Ceratites is currently best understood to be an endemic direct descendant of these forms evolving in place through a sequence of chronospecies that can be traced throughout the ~3.5 million year long existence of the Germanic Basin sea of the upper Muschelkalk layers until the basin once again fully cut off from the Tethys and was subject to evaporites at the transition to the Keuper sedimentary units, at which point the genus Ceratites most likely went extinct, leaving no descendants.
