= Aplococeratidae =

Aplococeratidae Temporal range: Anisian–Ladinian

Scientific classification
- Domain: Eukaryota
- Kingdom: Animalia
- Phylum: Mollusca
- Class: Cephalopoda
- Subclass: †Ammonoidea
- Order: †Ceratitida
- Superfamily: †Danubitoidea
- Family: †Aplococeratidae; Spath, 1951

Genera
- See text

Extinct family of molluscs

Aplococeratidae is a family of ceratitids from the Middle Triassic with very simplified sutures and a tendency to lose their ornamentation. Shells are generally evolute, more or less compressed, with rounded venters. Ornamentation if present consists of umbilical ribs that disappear outwardly, toward the venter. The suture is ceratitic or goniatitic.

Arkell et al. (1957), in the Treatise on Invertebrate Paleontology, Part L included the Aplococeraitdae in the Ceratitaceae, whereas E. T. Tozer in 1981 includes them in the Danubitaceae, established by Spath, also in 1951.

Genera included in the Aplococeratidae are Aplococeras (type), Apleuroceras, Epiceratites, Laboceras, Metadinarites, Pseudaplococeras, and Velebites.

== Sources ==
- Arkell, et al, 1957. Mesozoic Ammonoidea; Treatise on Invertebrate Paleontology, Part L (L157-158). Geological Society of America and University of Kansas Press.
- Paleobiology Database Aplococeratidae entry accessed 9 December 2011
