= Frechites =

Frechites Temporal range: early Triassic

Conservation status
- Extinct

Scientific classification
- Kingdom: Animalia
- Phylum: Mollusca
- Class: Cephalopoda
- Subclass: †Ammonoidea
- Order: †Ceratitida
- Family: †Beyrichitidae
- Genus: †Frechites; Smith, 1932

Genus of molluscs (fossil)

Frechites is an early Triassic ammonite, a kind of cephalopod with an external shell, included in the ceratitid family Beyrichitidae.

== Taxonomic revision ==
J.P. Smith, 1932, put Frechites in the Ceratididae where it remained included in the Treatise Part L. It was later removed to the Beyrichitidae, established by Spath, 1934.

== Comparative morphology ==
The shell of Frechites is robust, involute, and strongly ribbed. The outer whorl embraces most of the inner, leaving a small umbilicus. Short, strong ribs appear along the umbilical shoulder that split in twos and threes in the middle of the sides, which continue to the outer, or ventrolateral, shoulder but do not cross the venter, or outer rim, which is left smooth.

The suture of Frechites is partly ammonitic, with a slightly serrate first lateral saddle. The other saddles in the suture are rounded and smooth. As such this is intermediate between common Ceratitidae with entirely ceratite sutures -smooth saddles, serrate lobes, and the normal Beyrichideae with sutures that tend to be ammonitic or subammonitid, with deep serrated lobes and high serrated saddles.
