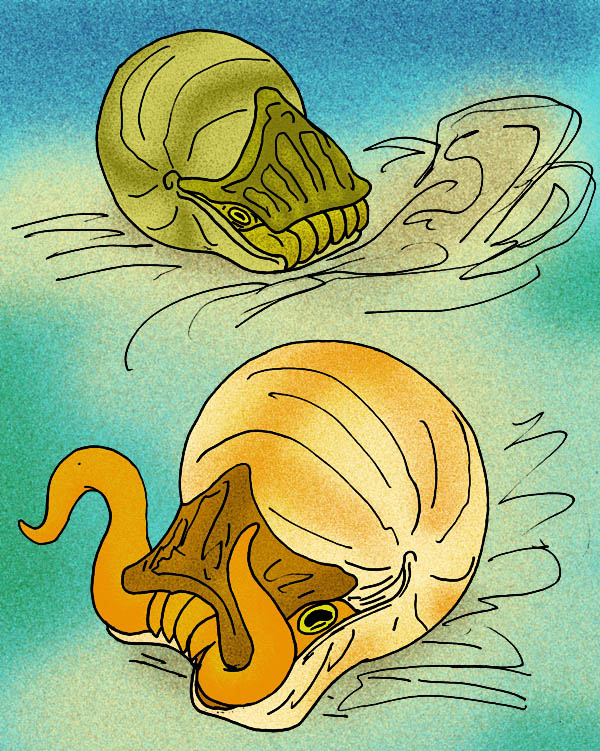
- A. intuslabiatus and A. binacostomus

Scientific classification
- Domain: Eukaryota
- Kingdom: Animalia
- Phylum: Mollusca
- Class: Cephalopoda
- Subclass: †Ammonoidea
- Order: †Ceratitida
- Family: †Arcestidae
- Genus: †Arcestes; Suess, 1865

Species
- A. (Pararcestes); A. andersoni † Hyatt and Smith 1905; A. intuslabiatus † Mojsisovics 1873; A. megaphyllus † Beyrich 1864; A. priscus † Waagen 1879; A. syngonus † Mojsisovics 1873

= Arcestes =

Arcestes Temporal range: Carnian–Rhaetian

Genus of molluscs (fossil)

Arcestes is a genus of extinct ceratitid ammonites found in Triassic-aged marine strata.

== Description ==
Their shells were broad and rounded, giving them an almost spherical appearance. Unlike many other ammonites, the shells of Arcestes lack keels that would otherwise stabilize them while swimming. Because of this, some paleontologists have suggested that they were bottom-dwelling crawlers.

The shell of Arcestes is globular or subglobular with periodic narrow transverse constrictions in internal molds due to periodic internal transverse ridges (varices) in the shell. The suture is ammonitic with complexly subdivided elements. The ventral lobe is subdivided by a low median saddle. Lateral lobes and saddles have generally triangular outlines but are deeply embayed by strong projections forming tree-like patterns. They form a series diminishing in size and complexity in a rather straight line going from the venter to the umbilicus in the middle of the shell.

== Distribution ==
Fossils of Arcestes are found in Mid to Upper Triassic marine strata throughout the world, including California (A. pacificus), Nevada (A (Anisarcestes) mrazici) and Austria (A. intuslabiatus and A. binacostomus).

== Gallery ==
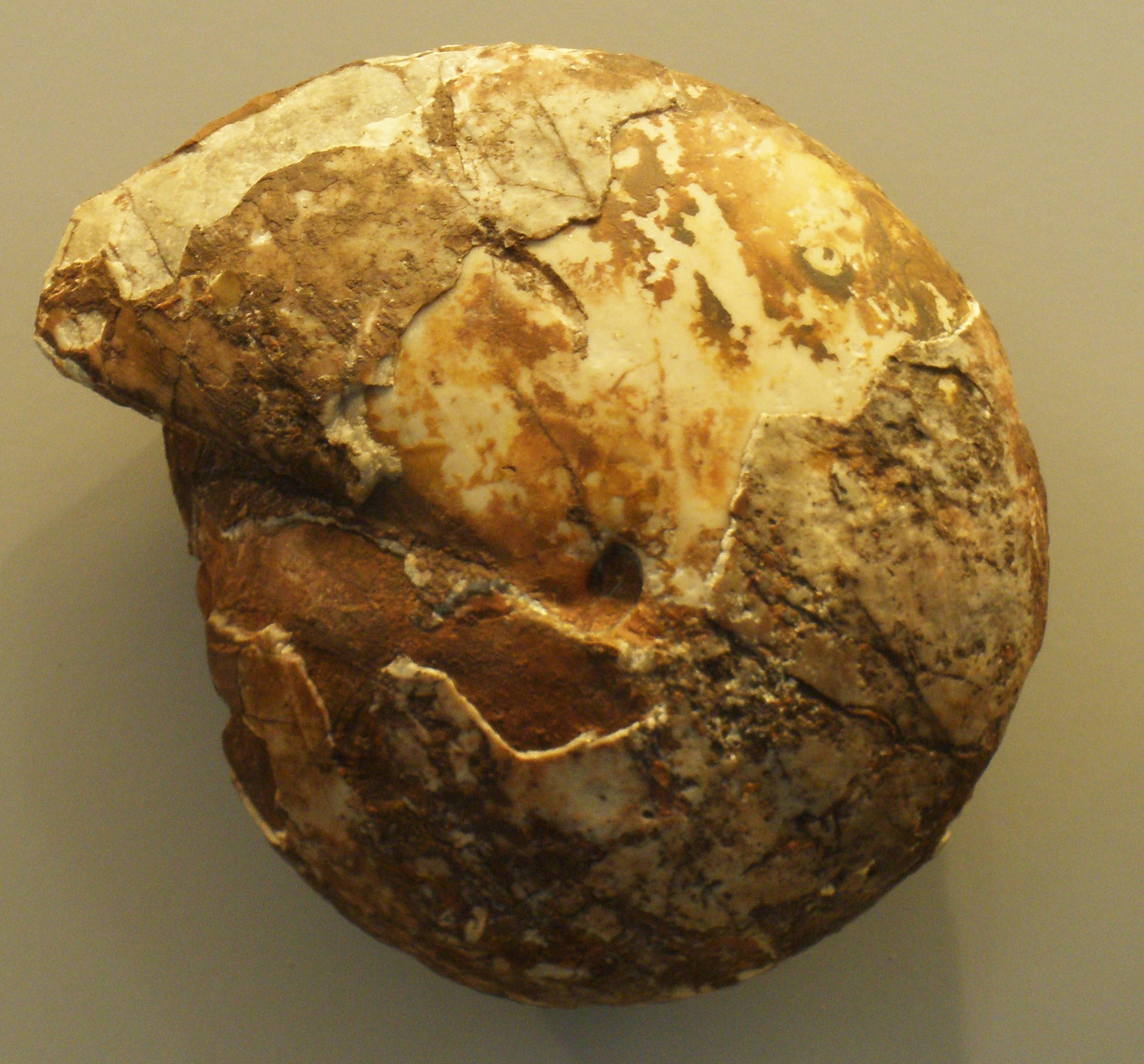
Museum specimen of Arcestes species

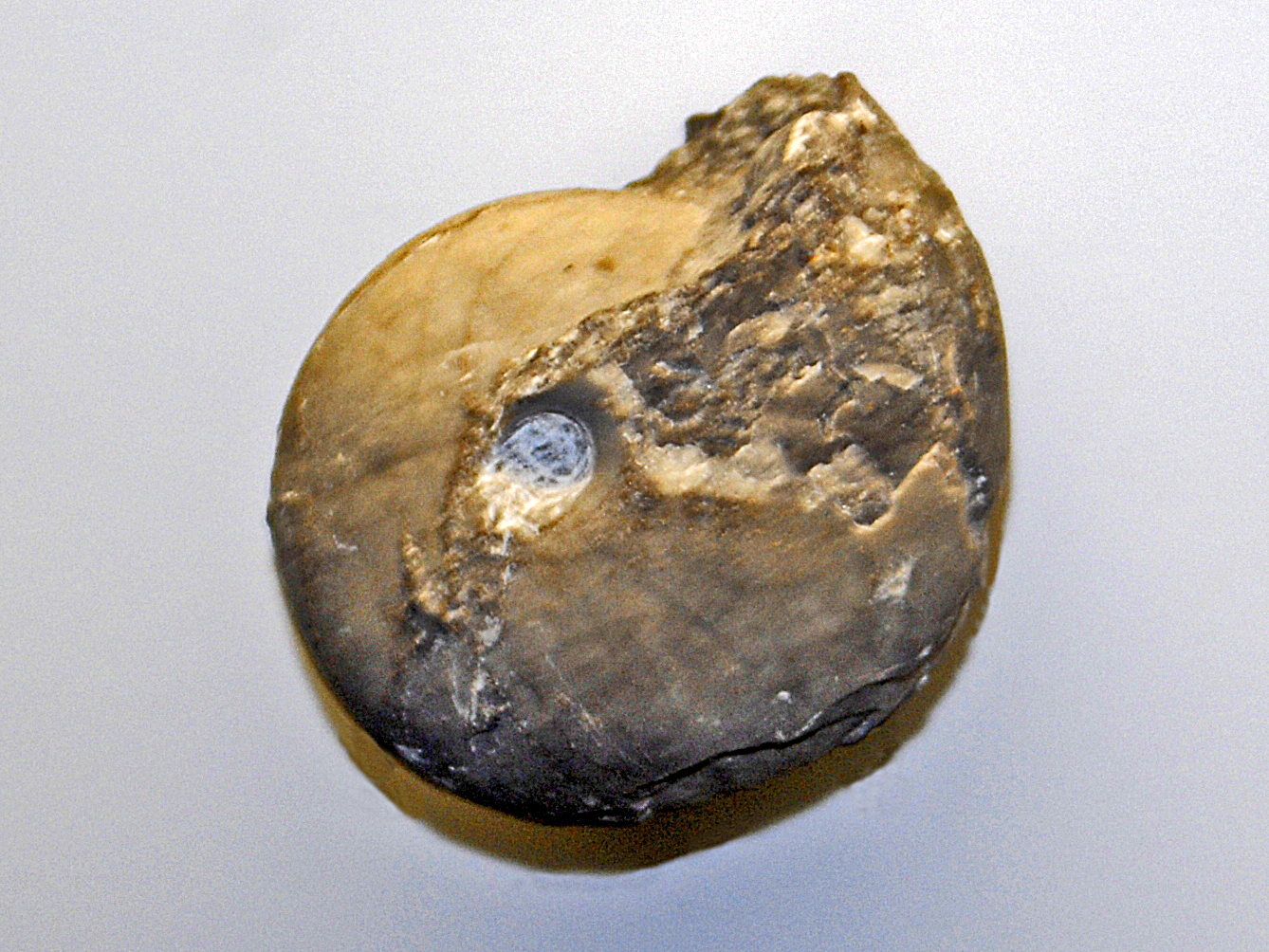
Museum specimen of Arcestes species
