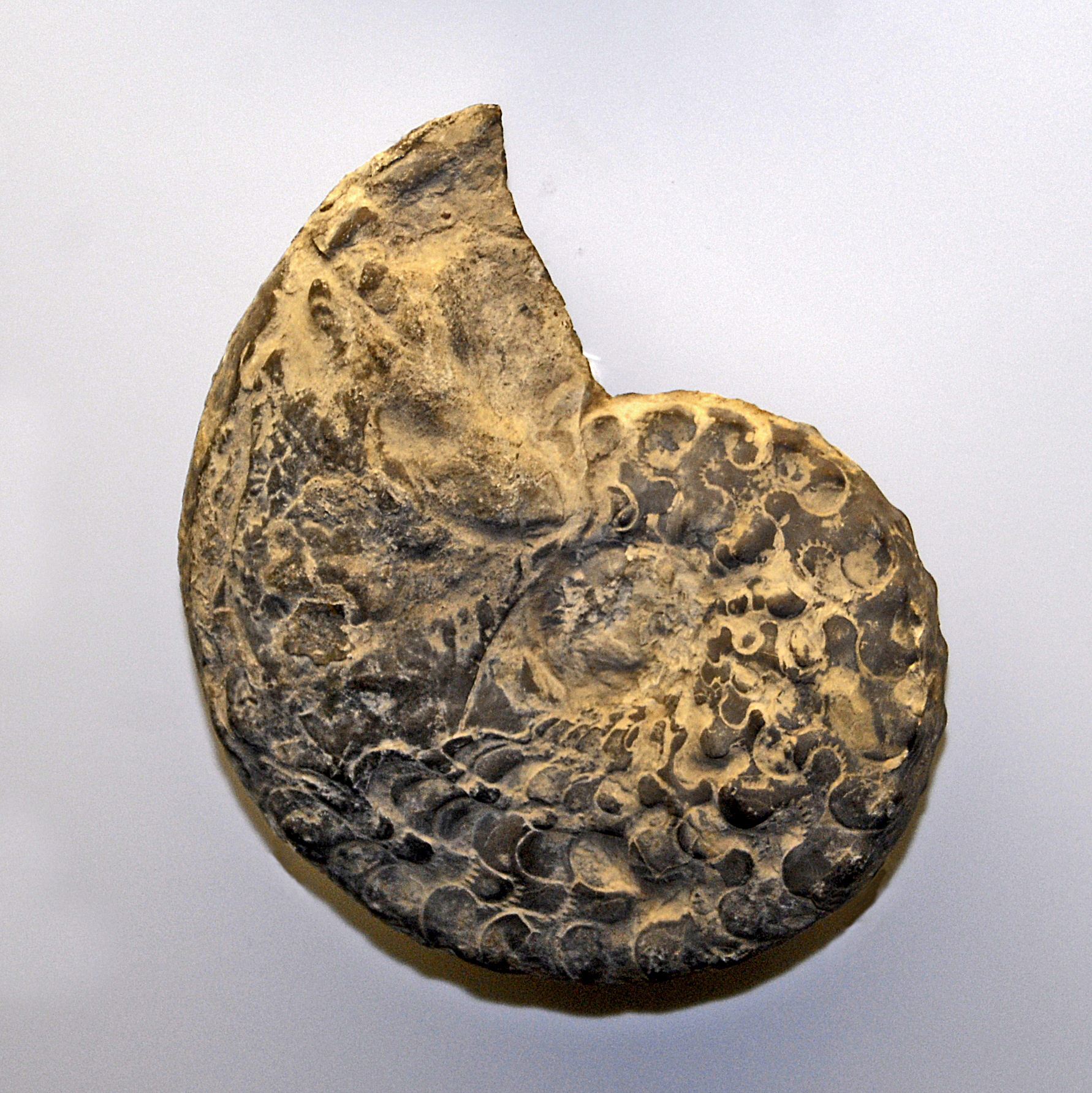
- Ceratites dorsoplanus from Mid Triassic - Germany

Scientific classification
- Kingdom: Animalia
- Phylum: Mollusca
- Class: Cephalopoda
- Subclass: †Ammonoidea
- Order: †Ceratitida
- Superfamily: †Ceratitoidea
- Family: †Ceratitidae; Mojsisovics 1879

= Ceratitidae =

Ceratitidae Temporal range: Triassic

Extinct family of ammonites

Ceratitidae is an extinct family of ammonite cephalopods.

Fossils of Ceratitidae are found in the Triassic marine strata throughout the world, including Asia, Europe, the Middle East, North America, and Oceania.

== Selected genera ==
Subfamily Ceratitinae Mojsisovics 1879

- Acanthoceratites Schrammen 1928
- Alloceratites Spath 1934
- Ceratites de Haan 1825
- Eogymnotoceras Bucher 1988
- Latemarites Brack and Rieber 1993

Subfamily Nevaditinae Tozer 1994

- Alkaites Balini et al. 2006
- Chieseiceras Brack and Rieber 1986
- Detoniceras Manfrin and Mietto 1991
- Nevadites Smith 1914
- Paranevadites Tozer 1994
- Xenoprotrachyc

Subfamily Paraceratitinae Silberling 1962

- Brackites Monnet and Bucher 2005
- Ceccaceras Monnet and Bucher 2005
- Eutomoceras Hyatt 1877
- Halilucites Diener 1905
- Jenksites Monnet and Bucher 2005
- Kellnerites Arthaber 1912
- Marcouxites Monnet and Bucher 2005
- Paraceratites Hyatt 1900
- Parakellnerites Rieber 1973
- Repossia Rieber 1973
- Rieberites Monnet and Bucher 2005
- Rieppelites Monnet and Bucher 2005
- Ronconites Balini 1992
- Rossiceras Fantini Sestini 1994
- Semiornites Arthaber 1912
- Silberlingitoides Monnet and Bucher 2006
- Stoppaniceras Rieber 1973
