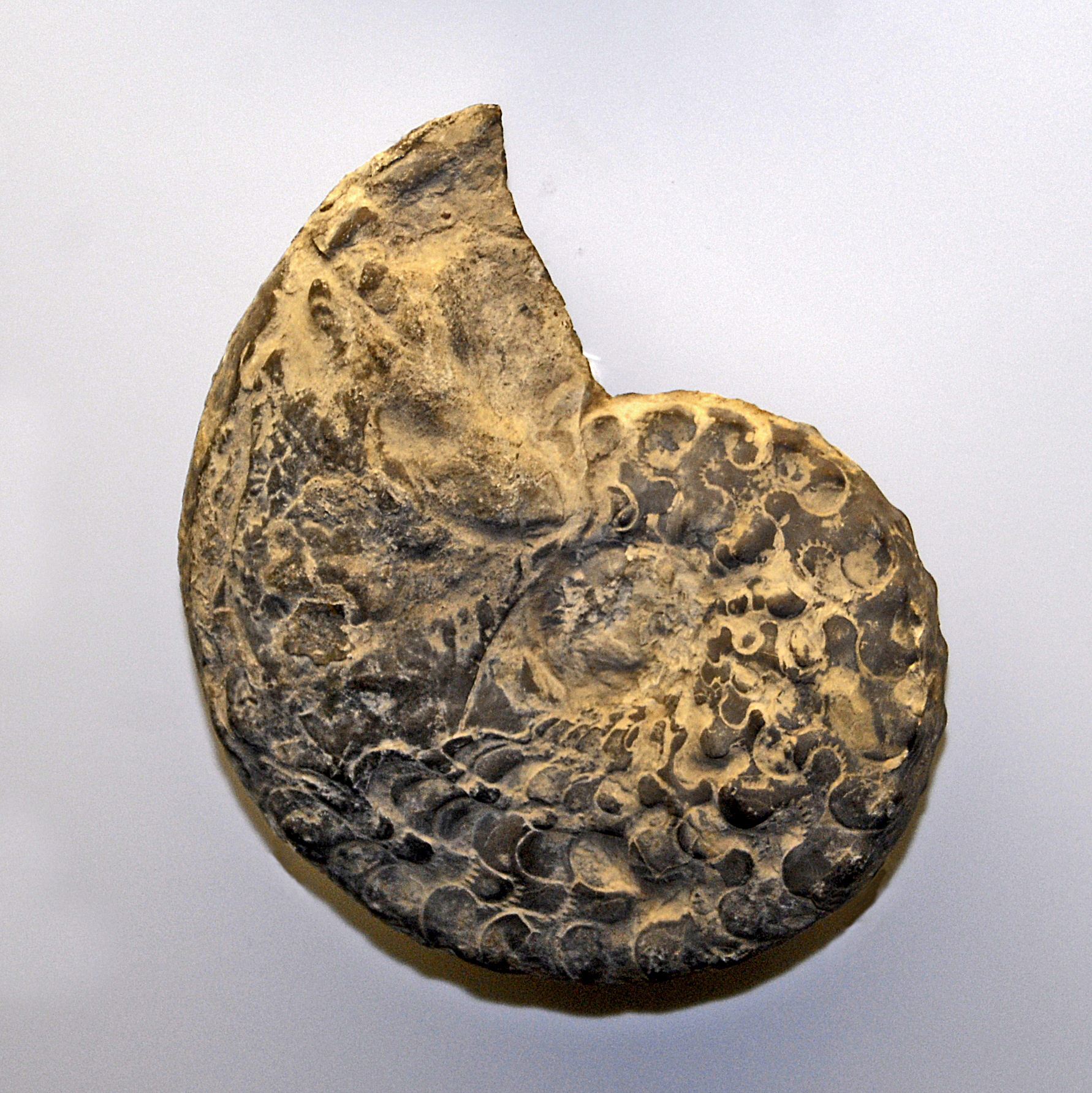

Scientific classification
- Kingdom: Animalia
- Phylum: Mollusca
- Class: Cephalopoda
- Subclass: †Ammonoidea
- Order: †Ceratitida
- Superfamily: †Ceratitoidea; Mojsisovics, 1879

Families
- Acrochordiceratidae; Aplococeratidae; Badiotitidae; Balatonitidae; Ceratitidae; Danubitidae; Hungaritidae; Keyserlingitidae; Longobarditidae; Rimkinitidae; Sibiritidae

= Ceratitoidea =

Ceratitoidea Temporal range: Middle Triassic–Late Triassic

Extinct superfamily of ammonites

Ceratitoidea, formerly Ceratitaceae, is an ammonite superfamily in the order Ceratitida characterized in general by highly ornamented or tuberculate shells with ceratitic sutures that may become goniatitic or ammonitic in some offshoots. (Arkell et al. 1962)

== Phylo-taxonomy ==
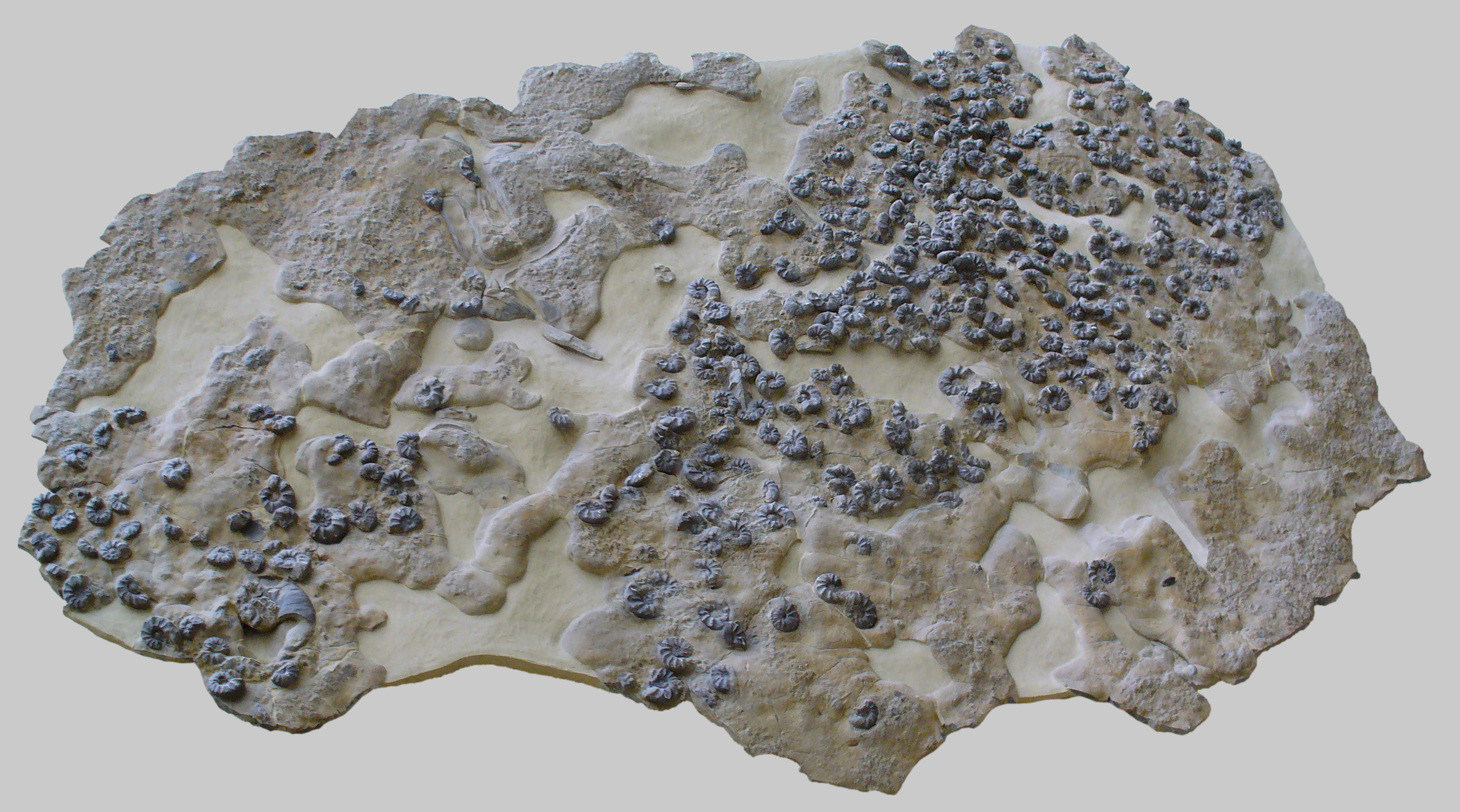
Ceratites-Plate, fossil sea bottom, Upper Muschelkalk, with Ceratites spec. (mostly), Germanonautilus bidorsatus, Placunopsis spec., Coenothyris spec., and Rhizocorallium commune

The Ceratitoidea, according to the Treatise on Invertebrate Paleontology (fig. 149, L104) can be divided into the Lower Triassic Hellenitidae, Dinaritidae, Tirolitidae, and Stephanitidae; the essentially lower Middle Triassic Acrochordiceratidae, Beyrichitidae, and Proteusitidae; and the lower Middle and post lower Middle Triassic Ceratitidae and its descendant families.

Families descendent from the Ceratidae are the Aplococeratidae and possibly or coeval, the Balatonitidae, Danubitidae, and Hungaritidae, and from the Hungaritidae, the Carnitidae. Of these the Balatonitidae and Danubitidae are restricted to the Anisian (lower Middle Triassic); the Ceratitidae and Hungaritidae to the Anisian and most of the Lidinian (upper Middle Triassic); the Carnitidae from the lower Lidinian through most of the Carnian (lower Upper Triassic); the Aplococeratidae from the lower Lidinian though most of the Norian (mid Upper Triassic).

Tozer, 1981, defined the Ceratitoidea as containing the Ceratitidae, Acrochordiceratidae, Balatonitidae, and Hungaritidae, as included in the Treatise with the Sibiritidae added from the Noritaceae and the since defined Keyserlingitidae and Rimkinitidae. The Danubitidae and Aplococeratidae are combined in the Danubitaceae; the Lower Triassic Stephanitidae is reassigned to the Noritaceae, the Dinaritidae, Tirolitidae, and Hellenitidae (replaced by the Columbitidae) combined in the Dinaritaceae. The Anisian Beyrichitidae is reduced to a subfamily the Ceratitidae. The Proteusitidae, also Anisian, is reassigned to the Nathorstitaceae.

== Derivation and outcome ==
The Ceratitoidea are derived from the Permo-Scythian (Lower Trias) Xenodisciaceae (also known as the Otocerataceae), through the Dieneroceratidae, which has its origin in the upper Paleozoic prolecanitid Daraelitidae. The Ceratitoidea is also the source for the Arpaditidae and Trachyceratidae, ancestral families for the Clydonitaceae (= Trachyceratitaceae sensu Kümmel 1952).
