= Clydonitoidea =

Clydonitoidea Temporal range: M & U Triassic

Scientific classification
- Kingdom: Animalia
- Phylum: Mollusca
- Class: Cephalopoda
- Subclass: †Ammonoidea
- Order: †Ceratitida
- Superfamily: †Clydonitoidea; Mojsisovics, 1879

Superfamily of cephalopods

Clydonitoidea, formerly Clydonitaceae, is a superfamily in the ammonoid cephalopod order Ceratitida characterized by generally costate and tuberculate shells with smooth, grooved, or keeled venters and sutures that are commonly ceratitic or ammonitic but goniatitic in a few offshoots.

== Taxonomy ==
Clydonitoidea unites 14 families (Arkell et al. 1962) (12 in Kummel 1952) derived from two ancestral stocks within, the Arpaditidae and the Trachyceratidae, which are derived from the Ceratitaceae.

The Trachycerataceae, Haug 1894, used by Kummel, 1952 and more recently by Tozer, was originally equivalent to the Clydonitaceae, Mojsisovics 1879, of the Treatise, Part L; Kummel perhaps because the Trachyceratidae is one of two ancestral families while the Clydonitidae comprise a derived group.

Tozer separated Trachycerataceae from Clydonitoidea, rearranging both, leaving Clydonitoidea with the original Clydonitidae, Clionititidae, and Metasibiritidae to which are added the Sandlingitidae and Thetiditidae. The emended Trachycerataceae includes the Trachyceratidae, Arpaditidae, Cyrtopleuritidae, Distichitidae, Heraclitidae, Noridiscitidae, and Tibetitidae.

== Phylogeny ==
According to Kummel (1952) and Arkel et al. (1962) in the Treatise on Invertebrate Paleontology, the Arpaditidae and Trachyceratidae are both derived from the Ceratitaceae.

The Trachyceratidae gave rise to the Leconitidae and Tibetitdae in the upper Middle Triassic and to the Clydonitidae and Cyrtopleuritidae in the lower Upper Triassic, the Cyrtopleuritidae in turn giving rise to the mid Upper Triassic Heraclitidae. The origin of the Noridiscitidae is uncertain and may not belong.

The Arpatitidae gave rise in the lower Upper Triassic to the Buchitidae, Choristoceratidae, Clionitidae, Distichitidae, and Thisbitidae. The Choristoceratidae gave rise in the mid Upper Triassic to the Cochloceratidae. Tozer distinguished the Choristoceratidae and Cochloceratidae as forming their own superfamily, the Choristocerataceae, with the addition of the Cycloceltitidae and Rhabdoceratidae.
