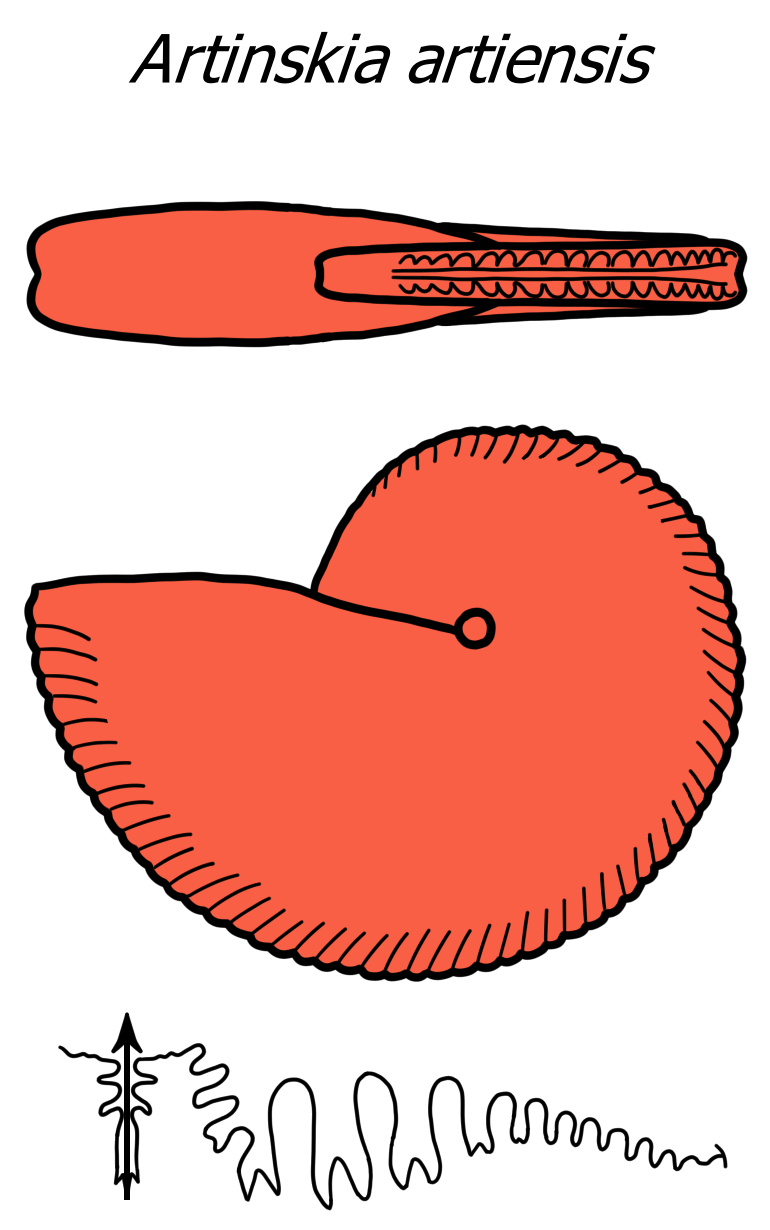
- Artinskia, an Artinskian medlicottiine

Scientific classification
- Domain: Eukaryota
- Kingdom: Animalia
- Phylum: Mollusca
- Class: Cephalopoda
- Subclass: †Ammonoidea
- Order: †Prolecanitida
- Family: †Medlicottiidae
- Subfamily: †Medlicottiinae; Karpinsky, 1889

Genera
- See text

= Medlicottiinae =

Medlicottiinae Temporal range: Upper Pennsylvanian–Lower Permian

Extinct subfamily of molluscs

The Medlicottiinae is a subfamily of the Medlicottiidae, a family of ammonoid cephalopods included in the Prolecanitida, characterized by having discoidal to thinly lenticular shells with a retuse (grooved) venter and sutures with bifid auxiliary lobes.

The Medlicottiinae classically included, by general consensus, the following five genera: Artinskia, Eumedlicottia, Medlicottia, Neogeoceras, and Syrdenites. Of these only Artinskia and Medlicottia, included in the Medlicottinae in the Treatise (Miller, Furnish, and Schindewolf, 1957) remain in Medlicottinae at present. Episageceras, Propinacoceras, and Sicanites, then included, have become type genera respectively for the Episageceratinae, Propinacoceratinae, and Sicanitinae.

Artinskia is the ancestral form, thought to be derived from Uddenoceras (Uddenitinae), which gave rise to the type genus Medlicottiia. Medilicottia then gave rise to Eumedlicottia and Neogeoceras. The derivation of Syrdenites is uncertain.
