= Michiganites =

Michiganites Temporal range: Middle Mississippian

Scientific classification
- Domain: Eukaryota
- Kingdom: Animalia
- Phylum: Mollusca
- Class: Cephalopoda
- Subclass: †Ammonoidea
- Order: †Prolecanitida
- Family: †Prolecanitidae
- Genus: †Michiganites; Ruzhencev (1962)

Extinct genus of molluscs

Michiganites is a member of the ammonoid order Prolecanitida, named by Ruzhencev in 1962, which comes from the Meramacian stage of Mississippian Period (early Carboniferous Visian).

The shell of Michiganites is discoidal and smooth, as for the family. The ventral lobe of the suture is expanded; three lobes are formed on either side.

Michiganites is placed in the suborder Prolecanitinae (the Prolecanitaceae of Hyatt 1884) and in the family Prolecanitidae along with related genera, Becanites, Dombarocanites, Eocanites, Katacanites, Metacanites, and Prolecanites
