= Darvasiceras =

Darvasiceras Temporal range: 290.1–279.5 Ma

Scientific classification
- Kingdom: Animalia
- Phylum: Mollusca
- Class: Cephalopoda
- Order: Prolecanitida
- Family: Darvasiceratidae
- Genus: Darvasiceras Leonova, 1990

Species
- D. mirum

Darvasiceras was a prolecanitid ammonoid cephalopod from the Early or Lower Permian Chelamchin Formation of Tajikistan. The genus is included in what is now the superfamily Medlicottioidea. The type species is Darvisciceras minum.

The shell of Darvasiceras is discoidal, moderately involute in adult stages; the venter narrow, smooth, and flat; the umbilicus shallow and small. The external portion of the suture consists of a small ventral and five umbilical lobes (per side). Lobes are weakly developed, are neither deep nor wide, and are separated by extremely wide, rounded saddles. The first two umbilical lobes are bifid, prongs being weakly developed.
