= Uralopronorites =

Uralopronorites Temporal range: U Carb (Penn)

Scientific classification
- Kingdom: Animalia
- Phylum: Mollusca
- Class: Cephalopoda
- Subclass: †Ammonoidea
- Order: †Prolecanitida
- Family: †Pronoritidae
- Genus: †Uralopronorites; Librovitch & Ruzhencev, 1949

Genus of molluscs (fossil)

Uralopronorites is a genus of very involute and smooth, medium-sized, prolecanitids with a distinct furrow along the venter and closed umbilicus. The adult suture has 22 lobes in all, 18 of which, nine on either side, are umbilical.

Uralopronorites comes from the Upper Carboniferous (Pennsylvanian equivalent) of Kazakhstan. It is an ammonite.
