= Parapuzosia (Austiniceras) =

Parapuzosia (Austiniceras) Temporal range: Cenomanian–Turonian

Scientific classification
- Kingdom: Animalia
- Phylum: Mollusca
- Class: Cephalopoda
- Subclass: †Ammonoidea
- Order: †Ammonitida
- Family: †Desmoceratidae
- Genus: †Parapuzosia
- Subgenus: †Austiniceras; Spath, 1922

Species
- See text

Subgenus of molluscs (fossil)

Austiniceras is a subgenus of Parapuzosia, the shell of which is commonly large, moderately involute, high whorled, with flat or convex sides that converge on a narrowly rounded venter. Primary ribs are sigmoid or concave. Constrictions where present are rather shallow. The related subgenus Parapuzosia (Parapuzosia) differs in having a more oval whorl section, stronger and straighter primary ribs, and a smooth outer whorl.

Parapuzosia (Austiniceras) has a long temporal range. It is known from Lower Cenomanian to Upper Turonian sediments in western Europe and from the Coniacian to the Campanian of Madagascar, and is recorded from Japan, North Aftrica, and North America (Texas).
