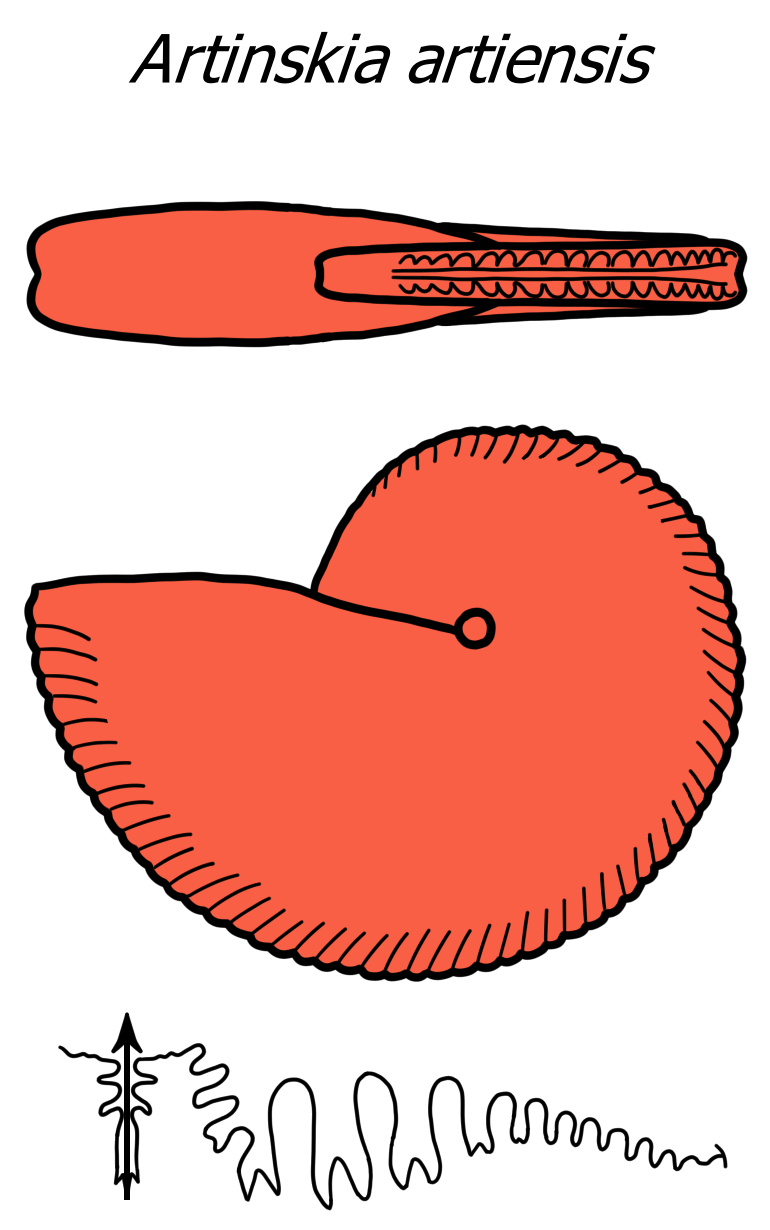
- Artinskia, an Artinskian medlicottiid

Scientific classification
- Domain: Eukaryota
- Kingdom: Animalia
- Phylum: Mollusca
- Class: Cephalopoda
- Subclass: †Ammonoidea
- Order: †Prolecanitida
- Superfamily: †Medlicottioidea
- Family: †Medlicottiidae; Karpinsky, 1889

Subfamilies
- Episageceratinae Medlicottiinae Propinacoceratinae Sicanitinae Uddenitinae

= Medlicottiidae =

Medlicottiidae Temporal range: Pennsylvanian - L Triassic

Extinct family of molluscs

Medlicottiidae is a family of ammonoid cephalopods belonging to the Prolecanitida, known from the Upper Carboniferous (Pennsylvanian) to the Early Triassic.

== Characteristics ==
Medlicottidae are characterized by discoidal to thinly lenticular shells and sutures with a narrow ventral lobe and a modified first lateral saddle.

== Taxonomy ==
=== Subfamilies ===
The Medlicottiide, established by Karpinsky in 1889, is by prevailing current perspective divided into five subfamilies. These are the Episageceratinae, Medlicottiinae, Propinacoceratinae, Sicanitinae, and Uddenitinae. The Artioceratinae and Miklukhoceratinae, sometimes included as well, are junior synonyms respectively for the Sicanitinae and Propinacoceratinae.

Previously the Medlicottiidae were divided in part L of the Treatise, 1957, into just two subfamilies, the Uddenitinae introduced by Miller and Furnish in 1940 and the Medlicottinae revised from Karpinsky 1889.

=== Higher taxa ===
The Medlicottiidae are included in the superfamily Medlicottioidea which now also includes the Pronoritidae and Sundaitidae. The Sageceratidae, included in the Treatise, Part L, 1957, have been removed to the ceratitid superfamily Sagecerataceae.

=== Alternative taxonomies ===
Hyatt and Smith (1905) included Medlicottia in the Pronoritidae, prior to the establishment of the Prolecanitina as a separate order by Mller and Furnish, 1954. The Pronoritidae of Hyatt and Smith were included in their suborder Pinacoceratoidea. The Pinacoceratoidea also includes the family Pinacoceratidae, which included the genus Sageceras, which later became the type genus for the Sageceratidae. The distinction between the Medlicottiidae and Sageceratidae lies mainly in the distinction of their respective sutural development.

According to Hyatt and Smith, the Pronoritidae contains Pronorites, Parapronorites, Medlicottia, (with its subgenera Episageceras, Propinacoceras, and Artinskia ), Sicanites, Uddenites, Sundaites, Daraelites, Albanites, and Cordillerites. Lanceolites was added by Smith (1932). All are confined to the Paleozoic except Episageceras which extends into the Triassic and Cordillerites and Lanceolites which are confined to the Triassic.

Smith (1932) pointed out that Medlicottia, Uddenites, and Cordillerites all have the peculiar Pronorites stage in their early development. Pronorites is recapitulated in the young of Parapronorites, Medlicottia, and Uddenites; less so in Cordillerites, and even less in the young of Daraelites.

Ruzhencev, 1949 (in Glesister and Furnish 1961) included in the Medlicottiidae following genera: Akmilleria, Aktubinskia, Arctioceras, Artinskia, Daixites, Eurmedlicottia, Medlicottia, Neogastroceras, Sicanites, Synartinskia, Propinacoceras, Prouddenites, and Uddenites.
