= Episageceratinae =

Episageceratinae Temporal range: 259.0–247.2 Ma

Scientific classification
- Domain: Eukaryota
- Kingdom: Animalia
- Phylum: Mollusca
- Class: Cephalopoda
- Subclass: †Ammonoidea
- Order: †Prolecanitida
- Family: †Medlicottiidae
- Subfamily: †Episageceratinae; Ruzhencev, 1956

Genera
- Episageceras; Latisageceras; Nodosageceras

Extinct subfamily of ammonites

Episageceratinae is a subfamily of the Medlicottiidae, a family of prolecanitid ammonites. The Episageceratinae, proposed by Ruzhencev, 1956, is based on the genus Episageceras previously included in the subfamily Medlicottiinae and lived during Late Permian and Early Triassic times. So far only three confirmed genera are included: Episageceras, Latisageceras, and Nodosageceras.

The type genus, Episageceras, named by Noetling 1904, is defined in the Treatise (L74) as like Medlicottia but with a broader shell and sutures with a smaller second lateral lobe. Latisageceras and Nodosageceras named by Ruzhencev 1956 are based on species of Episageceras.

J.P Smith, 1932 (USGS PP 167) included Episageceras in the Pronoritidae (p. 36) as a subgenus of Medlicottia.
