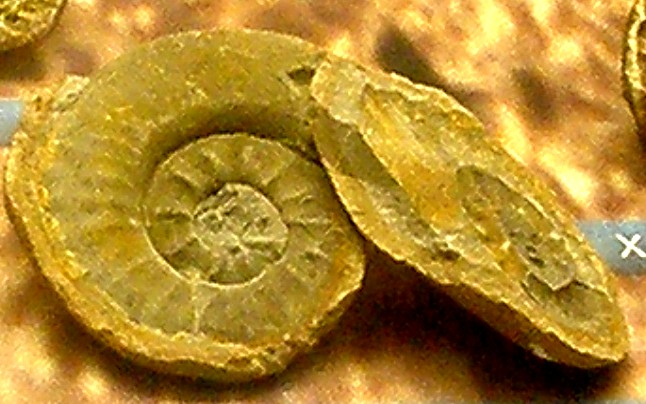

Scientific classification
- Kingdom: Animalia
- Phylum: Mollusca
- Class: Cephalopoda
- Subclass: †Ammonoidea
- Order: †Ceratitida
- Family: †Xenodiscidae
- Genus: †Xenodiscus; Waagen, 1879

= Xenodiscus =

Xenodiscus Temporal range: Lopingian

Genus of molluscs (fossil)

Xenodiscus is an extinct genus of ammonoid cephalopod and one of the earliest known ceratites, found in the Upper Permian of northern India and Timor. Xenodiscus is included in the family Xenodiscidae which is part of the ceratite superfamily Xenodiscaceae.

== Diagnosis ==
Xenodiscus has a thinly discoidal and ribbed shell with ceratitic sutures, coiled so all whorls are exposed. The whorl section is subquadrate and compressed, so as to be narrower than high.
