= Uddenitinae =

Uddenitinae Temporal range: Pennsylvanian

Scientific classification
- Domain: Eukaryota
- Kingdom: Animalia
- Phylum: Mollusca
- Class: Cephalopoda
- Subclass: †Ammonoidea
- Order: †Prolecanitida
- Family: †Medlicottiidae
- Subfamily: †Uddenitinae; Miller and Furnish, 1940

Genera
- See text

Extinct subfamily of molluscs

The Uddenitinae a subfamily of the Medlicottiidae, a family of ammonoid cephalopods included in the Prolecanitida. The Uddenitinae, proposed by Miller and Furnish, and known from the Pennsylvanian (U Carb) and Lower Permian, are transitional between the ancestral Pronoritidae and the more traditional medlicottiids.

== Morphology ==
Genera of the Uddenitinae have narrow discoidal shells with narrow flat or sometimes grooved venters. Sutures are goniatitic to ceratitic with rounded saddles and slightly pointed to digitate lobes which form a declining series going toward the umbilicus. The ventral lobe is commonly long and narrow, and trifurcated with sharp, simple prongs.

== Genera ==
The Uddenitinae includes Prouddenites, (ancestral form), Uddenites,(type genus), Daixites, Neouddenites, and Uddenoceras.

Prouddenites, named by Miller, 1930, which is found in the Pennsylvanian of the south-central United States and the Urals, has a discoidal shell with a flattened venter and a suture with an unequally trifid first lateral lobe. It is intermediate between Pronorites and Uddenites.

Uddenites, named by Böse, 1919, known from the Upper Pennsylvanian of Texas and the Urals, has a discoidal shell with a retuse (grooved) venter. The ventral portion of the first lateral lobe is intermediate in depth.

Diaxites, Ruzhentsev 1941, has the characteristic discoidal form but the ventral lobe is quite wide, still trifid. Diaxites is Upper Pennsylvanian and Lower Permian in age.

Neouddenites, Ruzhentsev 1961, is similar to Uddenites, but later, coming from the Lower Permian.

Uddenoceras, named by Miller and Furnish, 1954, from the Upper Pennsylvanian of Texas and the Urals has a discoidal shell like Uddenites, but the ventro-lateral portion of the suture forms a broad saddle.

== Generic phylogeny ==
Prouddenties has its origin in the (Pronoritidae), probably in Uralopronorites from the Upper Mississippian, and giving rise to Uddenites and Daixites. Uddenites in turn gave rise to Uddenoceras and Neouddenties. Daixites left no known descendants.
