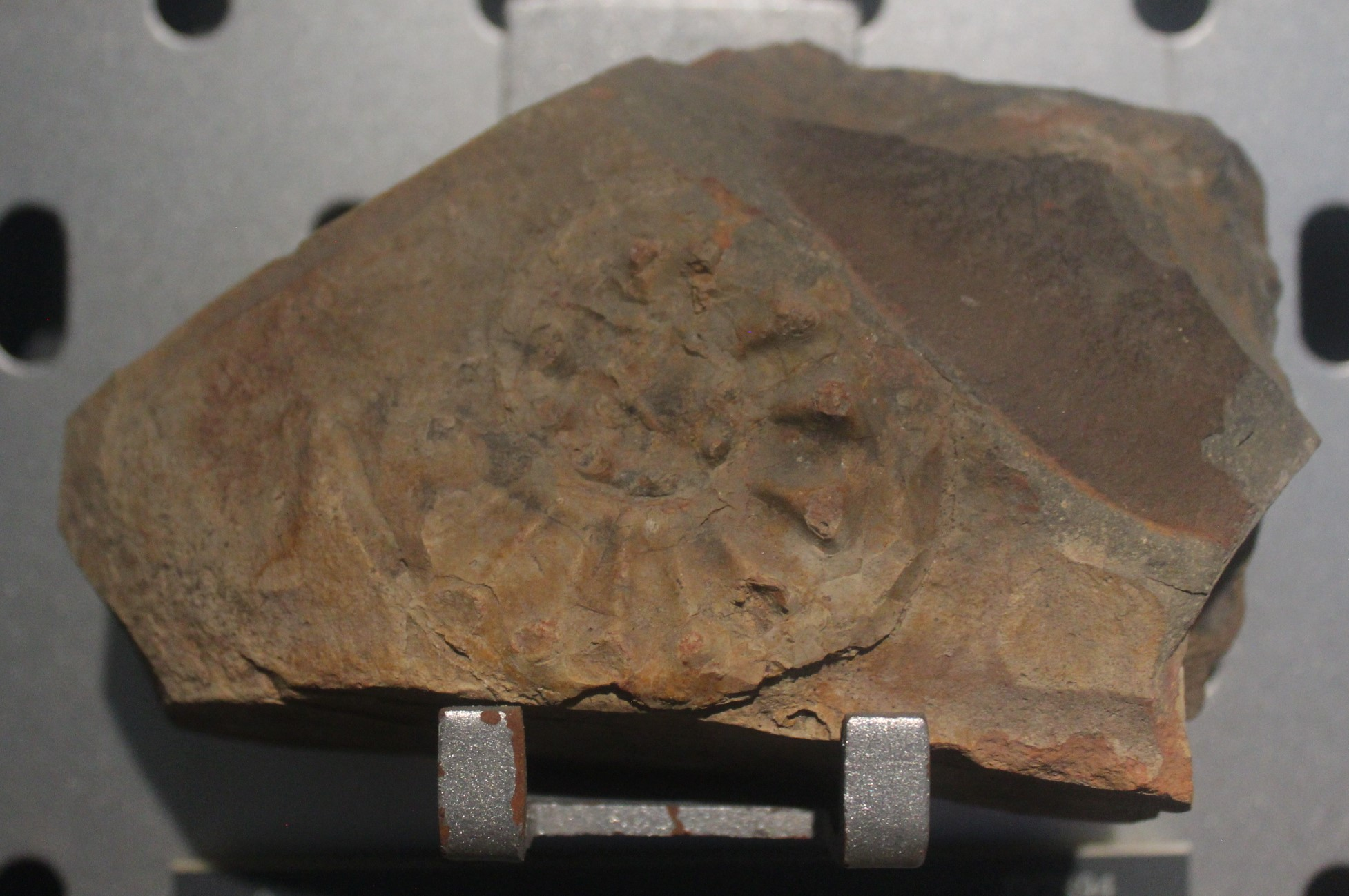
- Fossil specimen, Geological Museum of China

Scientific classification
- Domain: Eukaryota
- Kingdom: Animalia
- Phylum: Mollusca
- Class: Cephalopoda
- Subclass: †Ammonoidea
- Order: †Ceratitida
- Family: †Xenodiscidae
- Genus: †Arctotirolites; Popov 1963

Synonyms
- Pseudotirolites Popov, 1962

= Arctotirolites =

Extinct genus of molluscs

Arctotirolites is an extinct genus of cephalopod belonging to the ammonite subclass. It was described by Popov in 1963, based on a single specimen found in the Olenyok River basin, in the Olenikites zone of northern Siberia.
