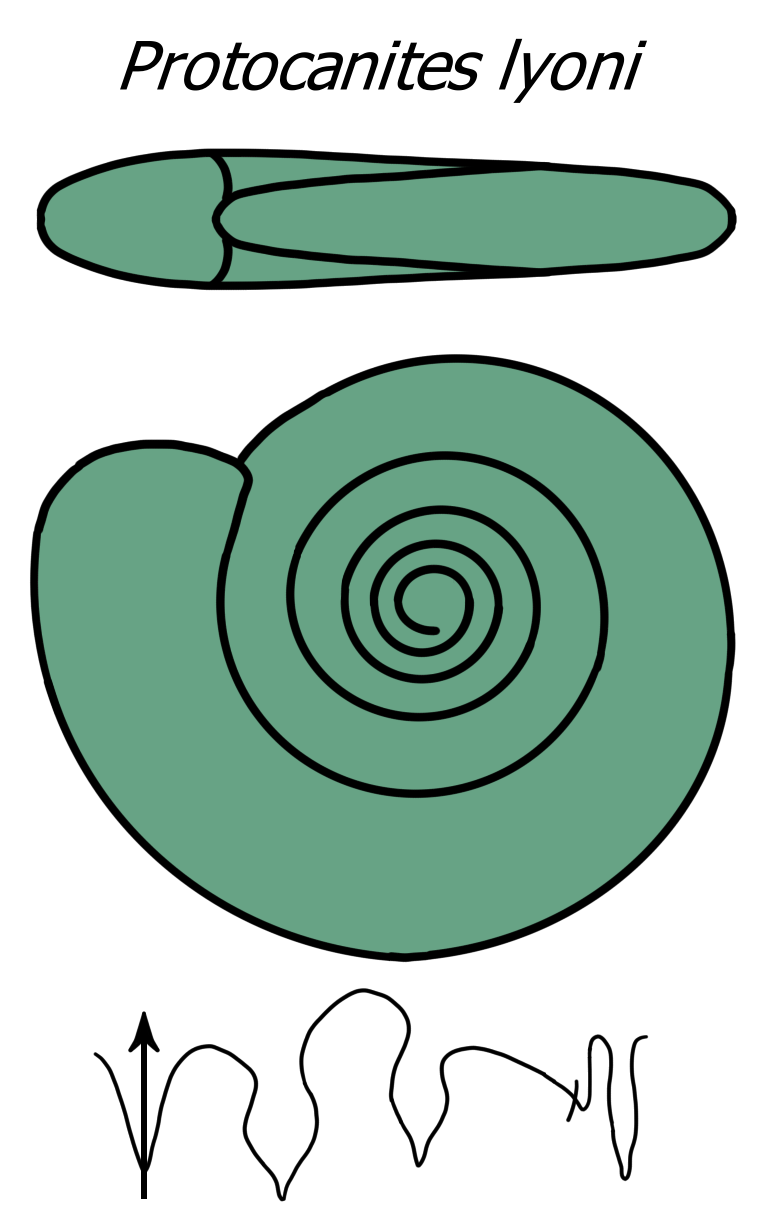
- Protocanites, a Tournaisian prolecanitid

Scientific classification
- Domain: Eukaryota
- Kingdom: Animalia
- Phylum: Mollusca
- Class: Cephalopoda
- Subclass: †Ammonoidea
- Order: †Prolecanitida
- Superfamily: †Prolecanitoidea
- Family: †Prolecanitidae; Korn et al., 2003

= Prolecanitidae =

Prolecanitidae Temporal range: 360.7–318.1 Ma

Family of molluscs

Prolecanitidae is a family of ammonites in the order Prolecanitida, with 10 genera.

== Genera ==
Genera placed by Fossilworks.

- Becanites Korn, 1997
- Cantabricanites Weyer, 1965
- Dombarocanites Ruzhencev, 1949
- Eocanites Librovitch, 1957
- Katacanites Kullmann, 1963
- Merocanites Schindewolf, 1922
- Metacanites Schindewolf, 1922
- Michiganites Ruzhencev, 1962
- Prolecanites Mojsisovics, 1882
- Protocanites Schmidt, 1922
