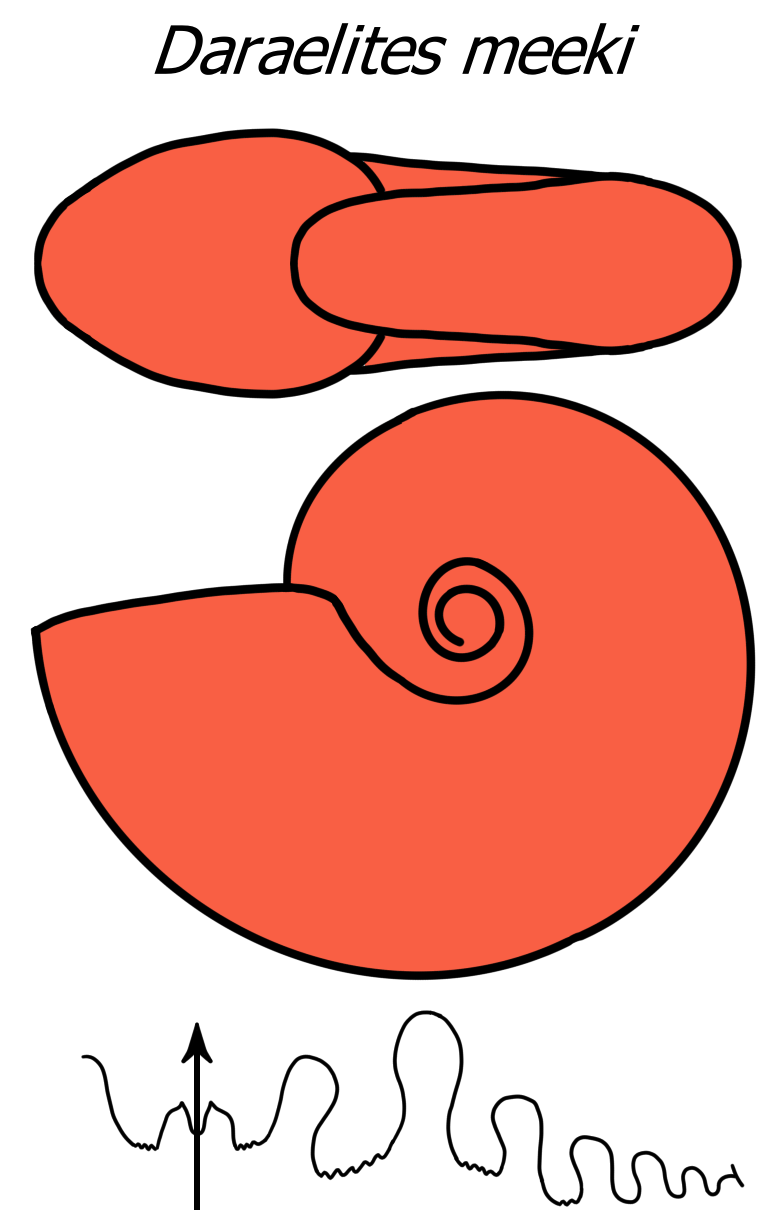
- Daraelites, a Wordian daraelitid

Scientific classification
- Domain: Eukaryota
- Kingdom: Animalia
- Phylum: Mollusca
- Class: Cephalopoda
- Subclass: †Ammonoidea
- Order: †Prolecanitida
- Superfamily: †Prolecanitoidea
- Family: †Daraelitidae; Tchernow 1907

= Daraelitidae =

Daraelitidae Temporal range: Mississippian–Middle Permian

Extinct family of molluscs

The Daraelitidae form a family in the ammonoid order Prolecanitida from the Upper Mississippian - Middle Permian characterized by discoidal shells with no prominent sculpture, moderately large umbilicus, and goniatitic or ceratitic sutures with a trifid (three pronged) ventral lobe and few auxiliary lobes.

The Daraelitidae are part of the prolecanitid superfamily Prolecanitoidea and are the direct descendants of the Prolecanitidae.

The Daraelitidae gave rise in the Middle Permian to the Xenodiscidae, the ancestral family of the mainly Triassic Ceratitida
