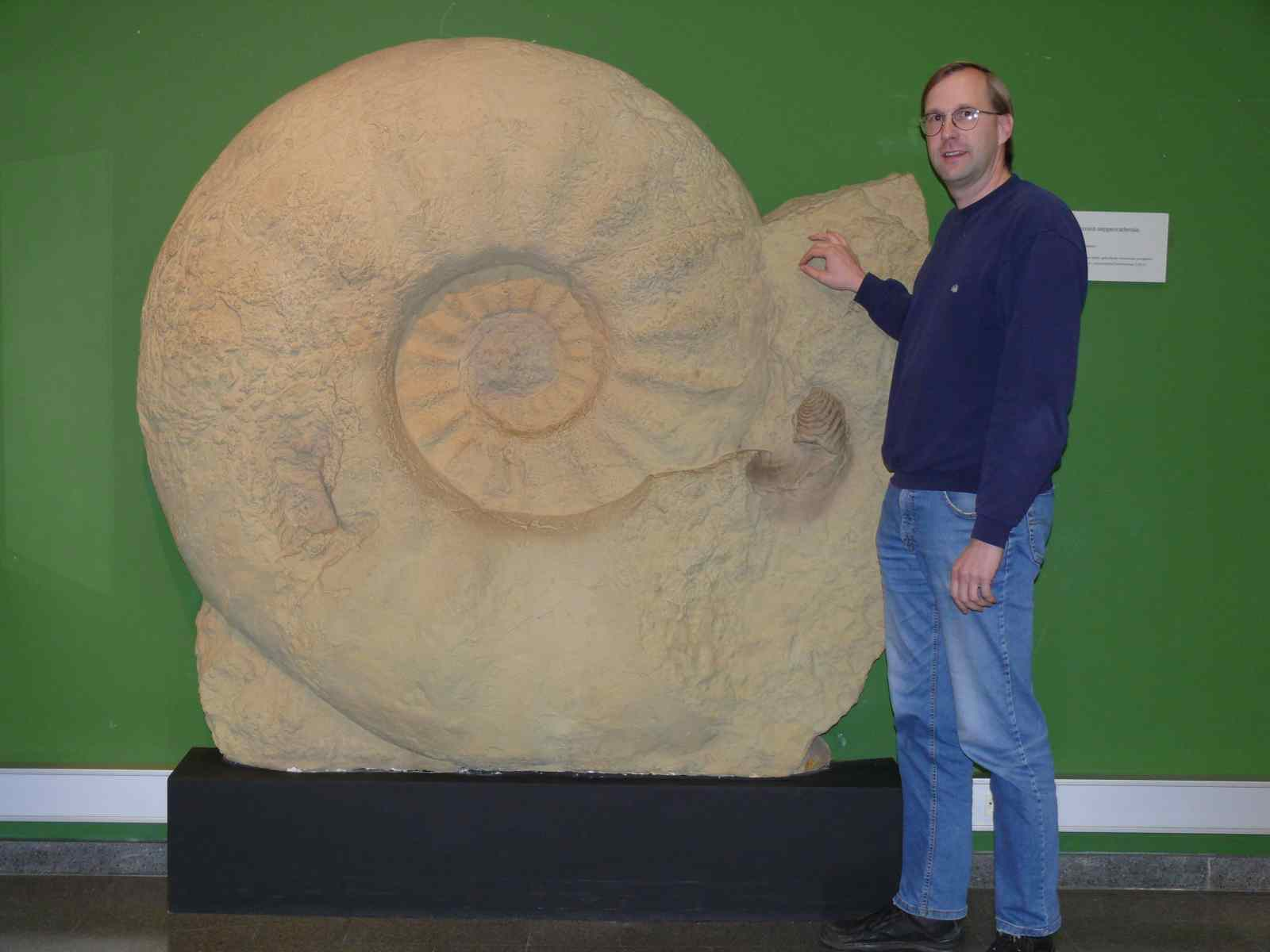
- Parapuzosia seppenradensis with a diameter of 1.8 m (5.9 ft)

Scientific classification
- Kingdom: Animalia
- Phylum: Mollusca
- Class: Cephalopoda
- Subclass: †Ammonoidea
- Order: †Ammonitida
- Family: †Desmoceratidae
- Subfamily: †Puzosiinae
- Genus: †Parapuzosia; Nowak, 1913

Type species
- Parapuzosia daubreei Grossouvre, 1894

Species
- P. americana (Scott & Moore, 1928); P. boesei (Scott & Moore, 1928); P. bradyi (Miller & Youngquist, 1946); P. corbarica (Grossouvre, 1894); P. daubreei (Grossouvre, 1894) (type species); P. seppenradensis (Landois, 1895)

= Parapuzosia =

Parapuzosia Temporal range: Cenomanian-Campanian ~99–71 Ma

Genus of molluscs (fossil)

Parapuzosia is an extinct genus of desmoceratid ammonites from the Cenomanian to the Campanian of Africa, Europe, and North America. They are typically very large ammonites, reaching diameters of 60 cm (2.0 ft) or more, with the largest species measuring around 2 m (6.6 ft). It possesses a moderately involute shell with flat or slightly rounded sides. Distinct primary and secondary ribbing can be observed in the inner whorls.

== Etymology ==
The origin of the generic name Parapuzosia ("similar to Puzosia") comes from the smaller, related desmatoceratid Puzosia. "Puzosia" comes from the Serbian words пужа/puža 'snail' and оса/osa 'axis'.
