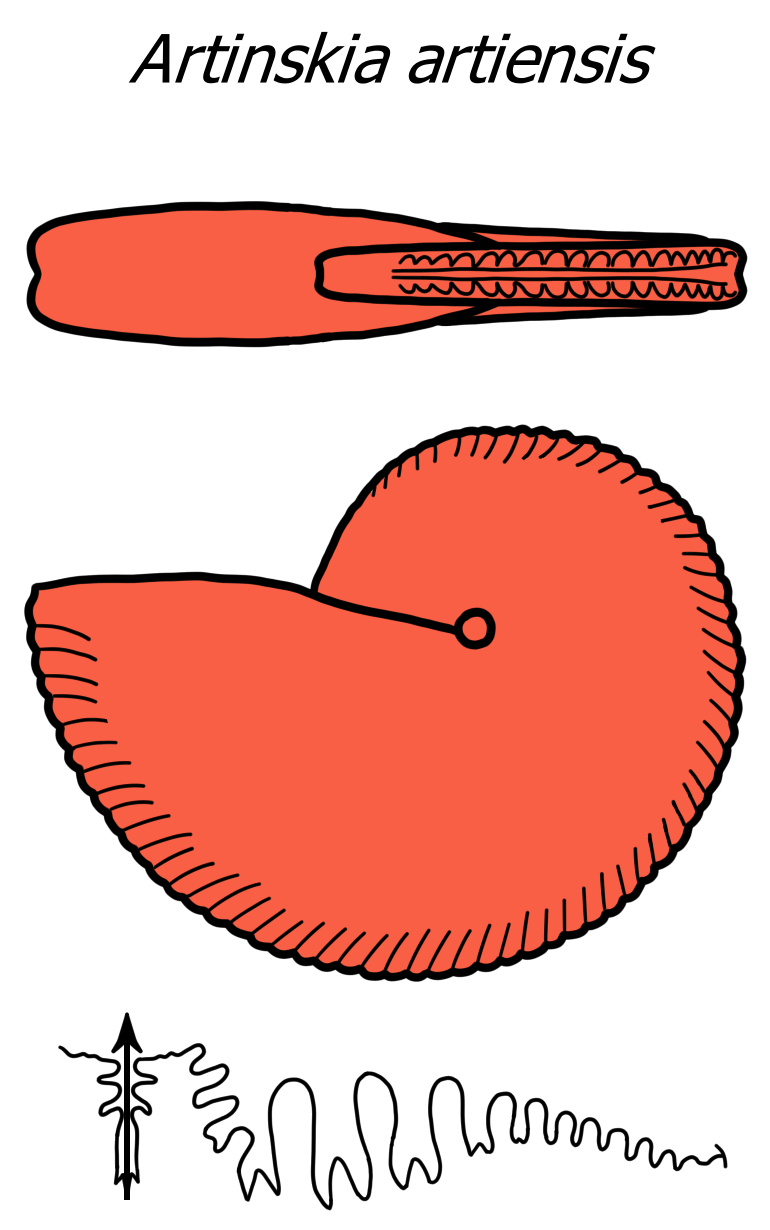
- Artinskia, an Artinskian medlicottiid

Scientific classification
- Domain: Eukaryota
- Kingdom: Animalia
- Phylum: Mollusca
- Class: Cephalopoda
- Subclass: †Ammonoidea
- Order: †Prolecanitida
- Superfamily: †Medlicottioidea

Families
- Pronoritidae; Medlicottiidae; ? Sageceratidae

Synonyms
- Medlicottiaceae

= Medlicottioidea =

Medlicottioidea Temporal range: Mississippian–Lower Triassic

Extinct superfamily of molluscs

The Medlicottioidea is one of two superfamilies that make up the Prolecanitida, the other being the Prolecanitoidea.

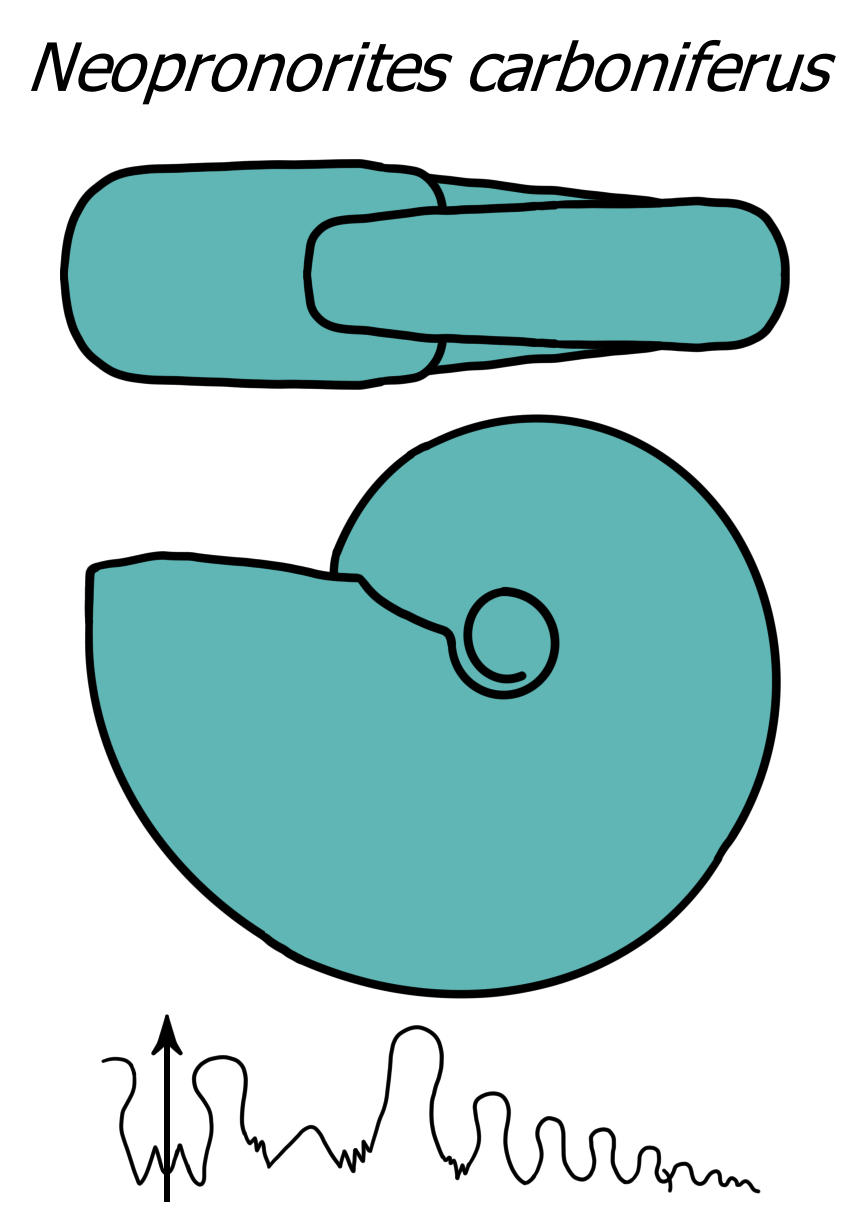
Neopronorites, a Gzhelian pronoritid

The Medlicottioidea are recognized by their discoidal to thinly lenticular, and involute shells with small umbilici; flat, often grooved venters, and variably complex sutures. Medlicottiacean shells are often more ornamented and may sport ventrolateral nodes or ribs.

The Medlicottioidea combines two related families, the ancestral Pronoritidae, descended from the Prolecanitidae in the Upper Mississippian and the derived Medlicottiidae which first appeared in the Lower Pennsylvanian. A third family, the Sageceratidae, considered to be derived from the Medlicottiidae, is included in the Ceratitida in more recent classifications.

The Medlicottiaceae have become known by the alternative Medlicottiodea, following the recent ruling by the ICZN regarding superfamily endings. Medlicottiaceae nevertheless has a long standing in the literature with the taxonomic rank clear, without the need for explanation.
