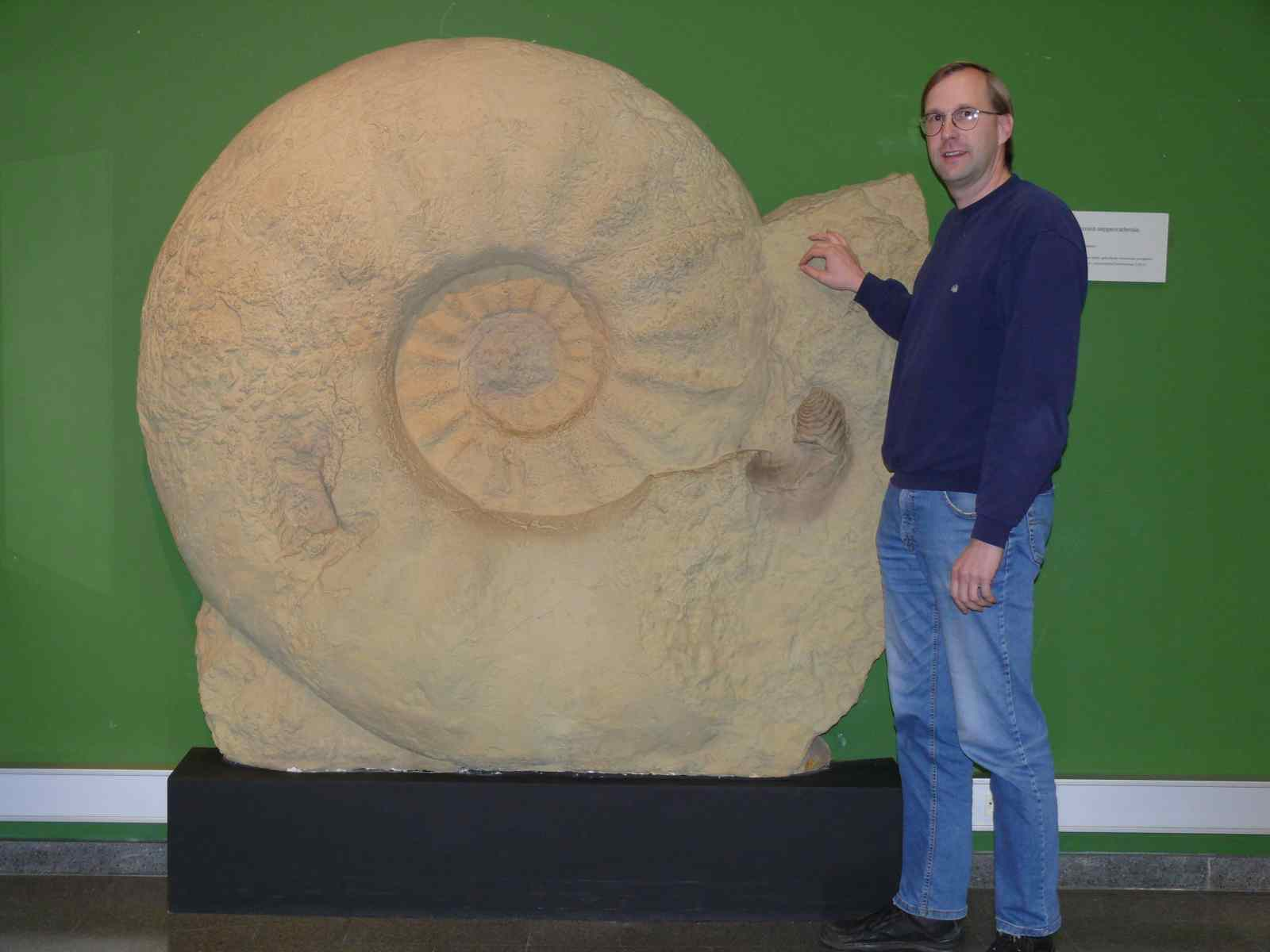

Scientific classification
- Kingdom: Animalia
- Phylum: Mollusca
- Class: Cephalopoda
- Subclass: †Ammonoidea
- Order: †Ammonitida
- Family: †Desmoceratidae
- Genus: †Parapuzosia
- Species: †P. seppenradensis

Binomial name
- †Parapuzosia seppenradensis (Landois, 1895)

Synonyms
- Pachydiscus seppenradensis Landois, 1895

= Parapuzosia seppenradensis =

Parapuzosia seppenradensis Temporal range: Lower Campanian

Extinct species of ammonite

Parapuzosia seppenradensis is the largest known species of ammonite. It lived during the Lower Campanian Epoch of the Late Cretaceous period, in marine environments in what is now Westphalia, Germany. A specimen, found in Seppenrade near Lüdinghausen, Germany in 1895 measures 1.8 m (5.9 ft) in diameter, although the living chamber is incomplete.

The original fossil is shown in the foyer of the Westphalian Museum of Natural History, Münster, Germany. It was once estimated that, if complete, this specimen would have had a diameter of approximately 2.55 m (8.4 ft) or even 3.5 m (11 ft). However, a study in 2021 estimated the diameter of the largest specimens to be around 2 m (6.6 ft). An 1898 study estimated a total live mass around 1,455 kg (3,208 lb), of which the shell would constitute 705 kg (1,554 lb). In contrast, a 2025 study estimated that the body weighed around 400 kg (880 lb) based on its shell volume, which would still place it among the heaviest cephalopods.

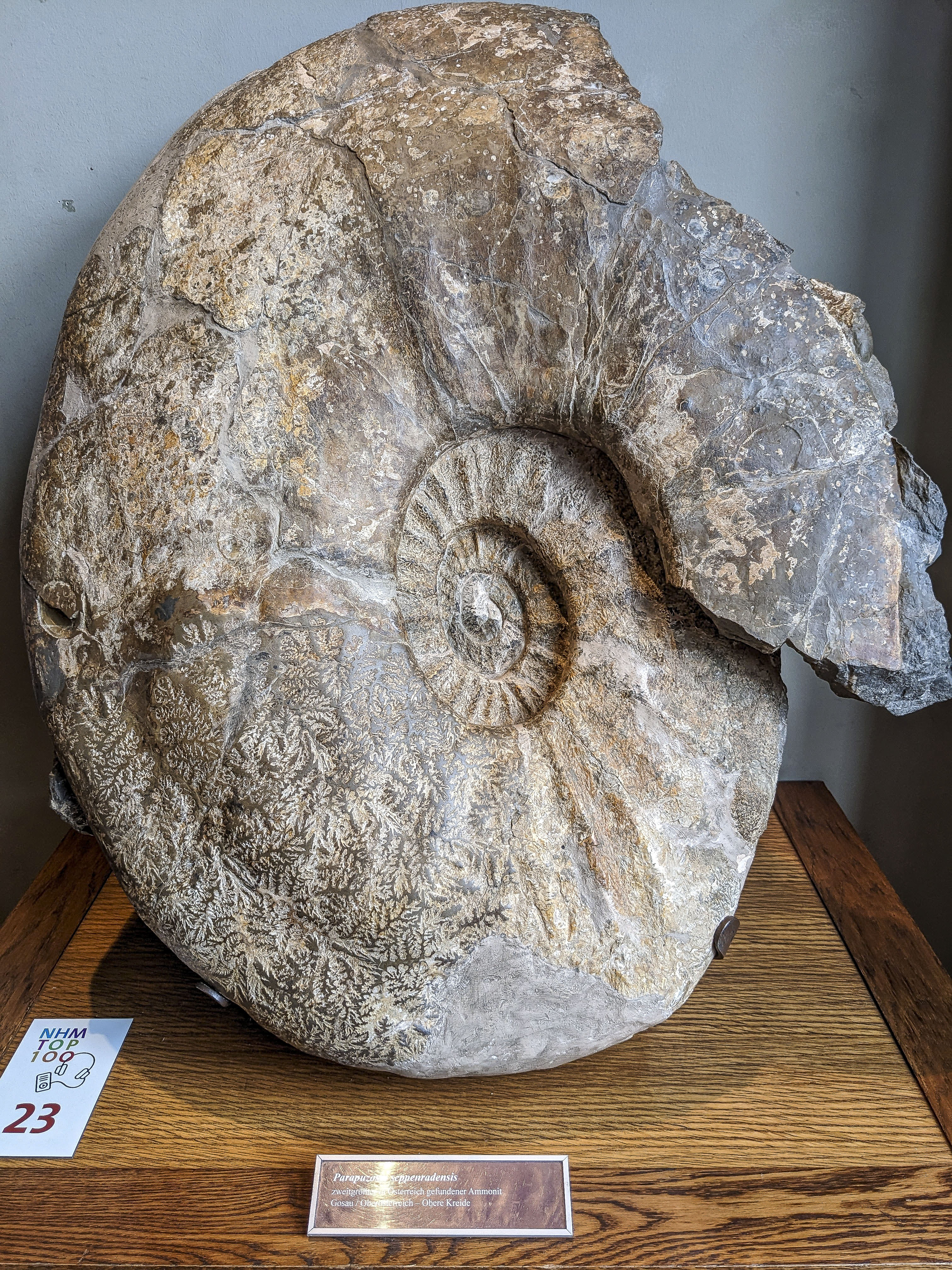
Parapuzosia seppenradensis at the Naturhistorisches Museum Wien

== See also ==
- Cephalopod size
