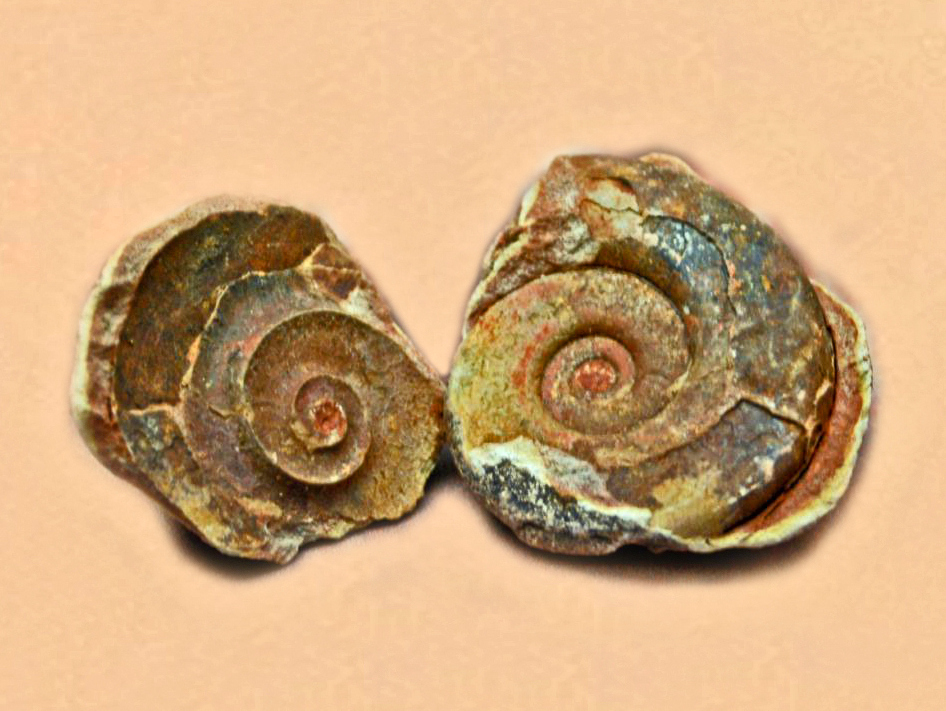
- Xenodiscus besairiei on display at the Museo Civico di Storia Naturale di Milano

Scientific classification
- Kingdom: Animalia
- Phylum: Mollusca
- Class: Cephalopoda
- Subclass: †Ammonoidea
- Order: †Ceratitida
- Superfamily: †Xenodiscoidea
- Family: †Xenodiscidae; Frech, 1902

Genera
- Aldanoceras; Arctotirolites; Glyptophiceras; Hanielites; Hemilecanites; Hypophiceras; Iranites; Kaibinoceras; Kelteroceras; Metophiceras; Penglaites; Phisonites; Pseudoceltites; Shevyrevites; Sutchanites; Tompophiceras; Tozericeras; Xenodiscus

= Xenodiscidae =

Xenodiscidae Temporal range: Guadalupian–Lopingian

Extinct family of molluscs

The Xenodiscidae are the earliest of the Ceratitida and comprise Middle and Upper Permian genera characterized by compressed, discoidal, evolute shells with rounded to acute venters and commonly with lateral ribs. Sutures are goniatitic to weakly ceratitic.

The Xenodiscidae, which are part of the superfamily Xenodiscoidea, are derived from the Daraelitidae, a family in the Prolecanitida (ibid). In turn, the Xenodiscidae provided the root stock for the subsequent expansion and diversification of the Ceratitida in the Triassic.
