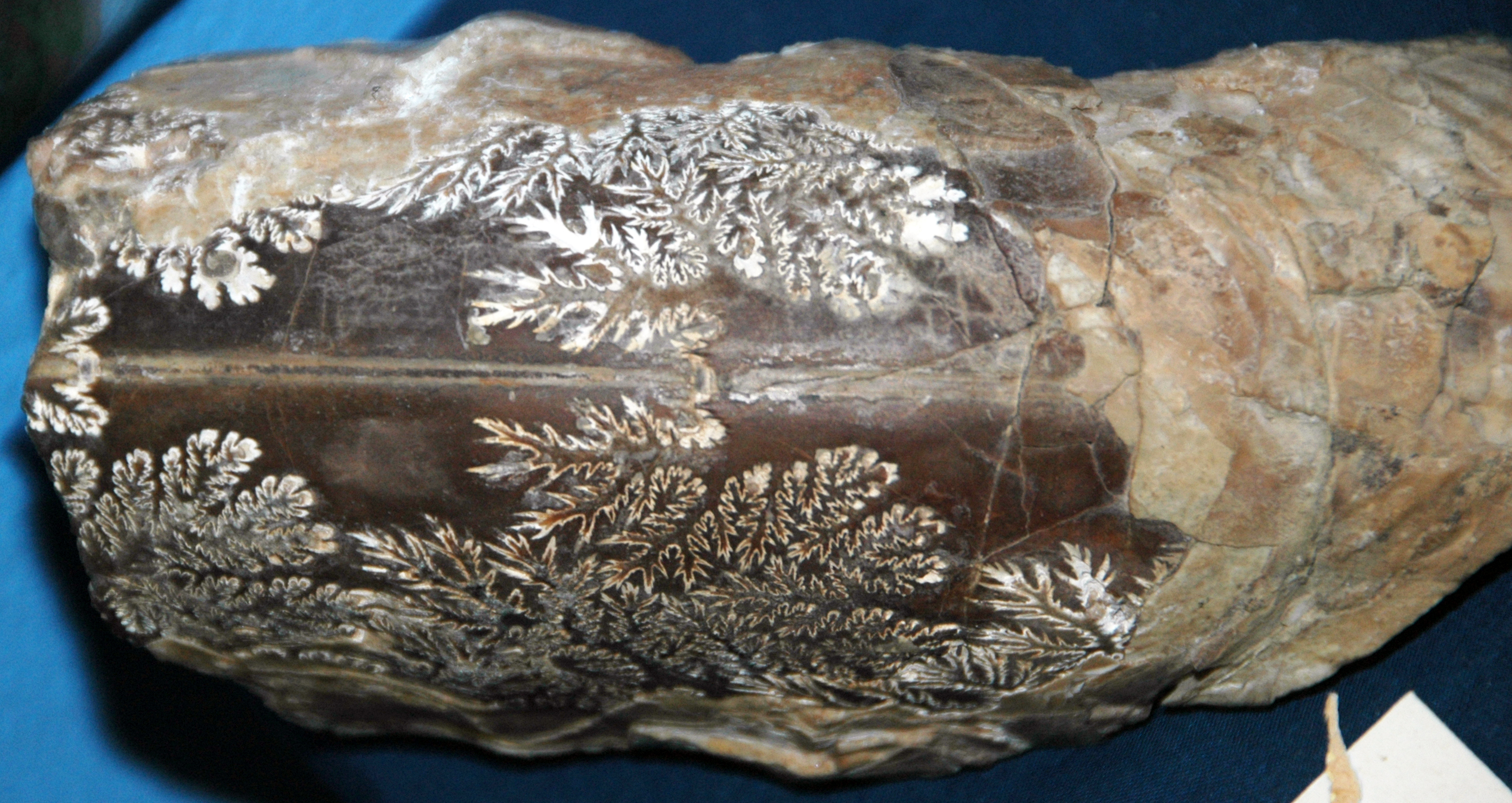

Scientific classification
- Kingdom: Animalia
- Phylum: Mollusca
- Class: Cephalopoda
- Subclass: †Ammonoidea
- Order: †Ammonitida
- Family: †Desmoceratidae
- Genus: †Parapuzosia
- Species: †P. bradyi

Binomial name
- †Parapuzosia bradyi Miller & Youngquist, 1946

= Parapuzosia bradyi =

Parapuzosia bradyi Temporal range: Late Cretaceous

Extinct species of ammonite

Parapuzosia bradyi is a gigantic species of ammonite, reaching diameters of more than 4.5 ft (1.4 m) by 6 ft (1.8 m). It is the largest species of ammonite in North America. It had a moderately involute shell with flat sides. The inner whorls are slightly oval-shaped with prominent ribbing. They are only known from the upper layers of the Eagle Sandstone and Cody Shale formations (both Late Cretaceous).
