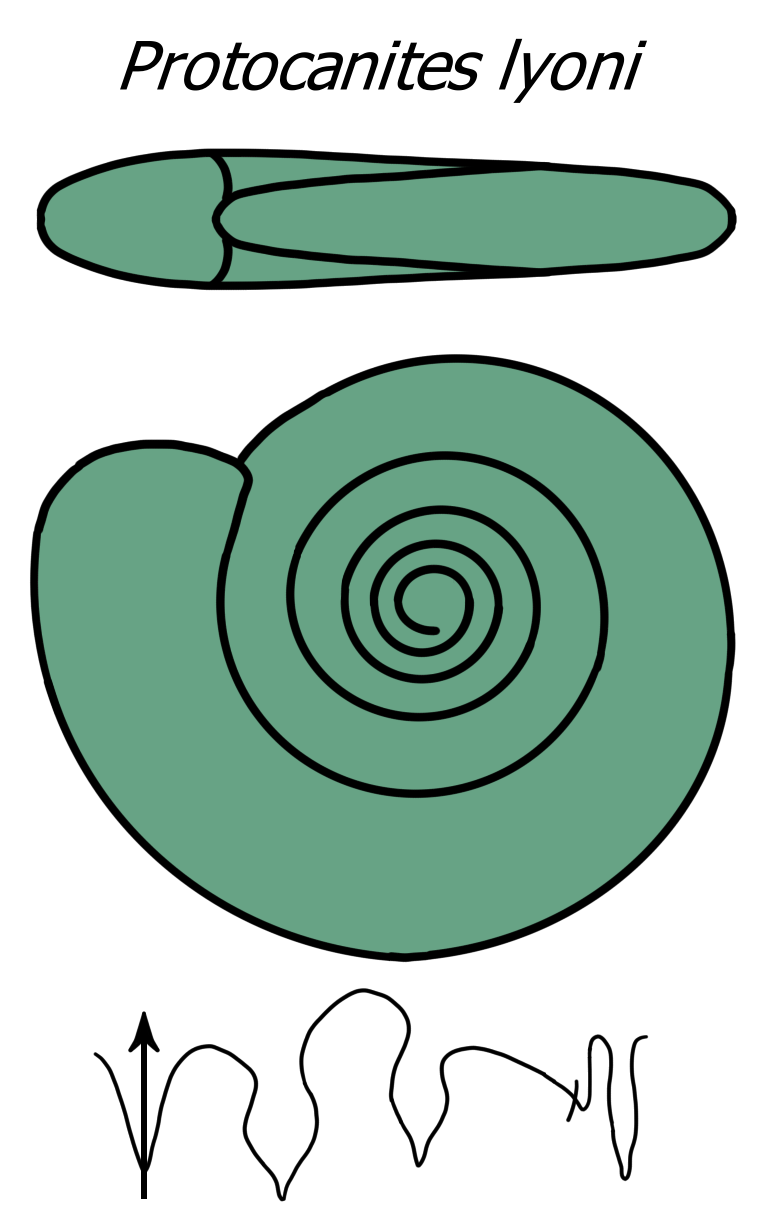
- Protocanites, a Tournaisian prolecanitid

Scientific classification
- Domain: Eukaryota
- Kingdom: Animalia
- Phylum: Mollusca
- Class: Cephalopoda
- Subclass: †Ammonoidea
- Order: †Prolecanitida
- Superfamily: †Prolecanitoidea; Hyatt, 1884

Families
- Prolecanitidae; Daraelitidae

Synonyms
- Prolecanitaceae

= Prolecanitoidea =

Prolecanitoidea Temporal range: Lower Carboniferous–Middle Permian

Extinct superfamily of ammonites

Prolecanitoidea is a taxonomic superfamily of ammonoids in the order Prolecanitida. Prolecanitoidea is one of two superfamilies in the order, along with the younger and more complex Medlicottioidea. The Prolecanitoidea were a low-diversity and morphologically conservative group. They lived from the Lower Carboniferous up to the Middle Permian. Their shells are generally smooth and discoidal, with a rounded lower edge, a moderate to large umbilicus, and goniatitic to ceratitic sutures. Suture complexity varies from 10 up to 22 total lobes (each side of a whorl combined); new lobes are added from subdivision of saddles adjacent to the original main umbilical lobe.

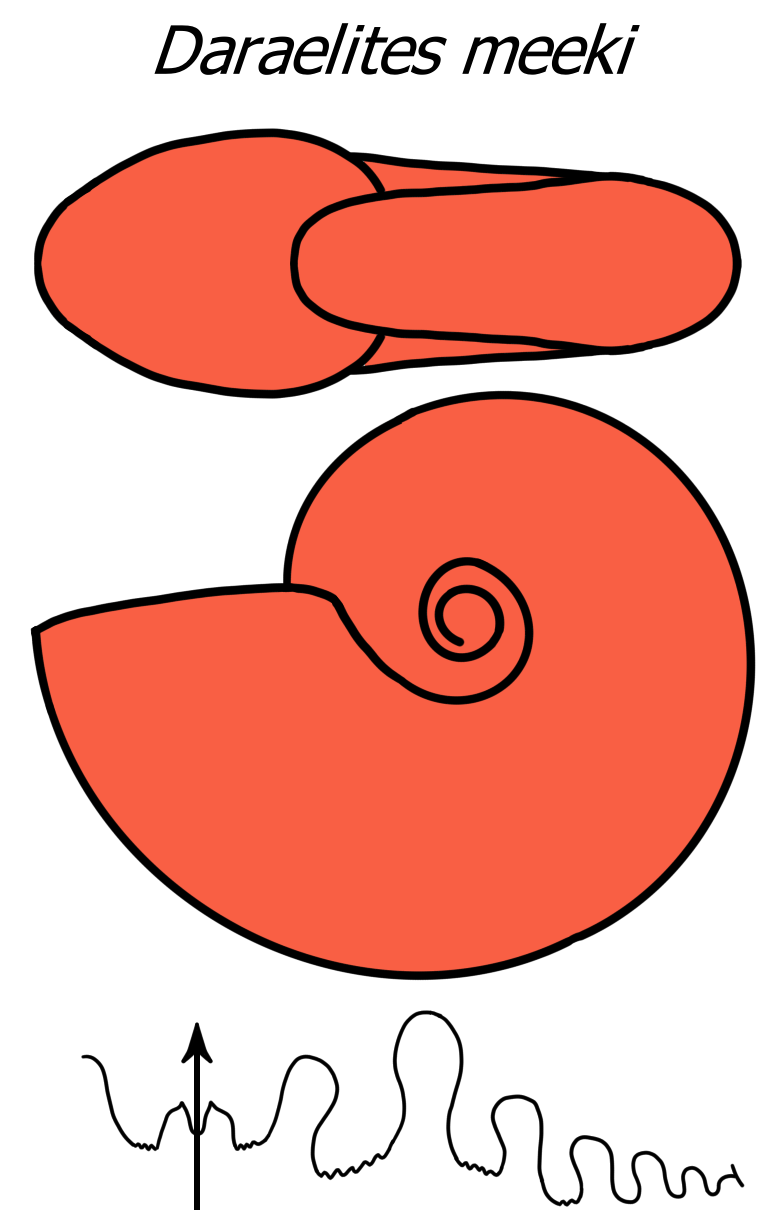
Daraelites, a Wordian daraelitid

The Prolecanitoidea encompasses two related families, the ancestral Prolecanitidae (lower Tournaisian – Bashkirian? stages) and the derived Daraelitidae (Viséan – Wordian stages). Prolecanitids and daraelitids differ primarily in the complexity of the suture: Prolecanitids are simpler goniatitic forms, with rounded saddles, pointed lobes, and an undivided ventral lobe. Daraelitids, conversely, often have a trifid (three-pronged) ventral lobe and a higher number of lobes as a whole, some of which are ceratitic (finely serrated). Daraelitids are probably ancestral to Ceratitida, the dominant order of Triassic ammonoids.

A third proposed family, the Mississippian-age Prodromitidae, is occasionally also placed within the order Prolecanitida. The affinities or monophyly of this family are uncertain due to drastic changes in their suture patterns through ontogeny. More recently, prodromitids have been moved to the goniatite suborder Tornoceratina.

The Prolecanitoidea were previously known by the name Prolecanitaceae, prior to the recent ruling of the ICZN regarding superfamilies. The suffix -oidea was previously used for some time in invertebrate taxonomies as the ending for subclasses, e.g. Ammonoidea. The Medlicottioidea are also sometimes known as the suborder Prolecanitina.
