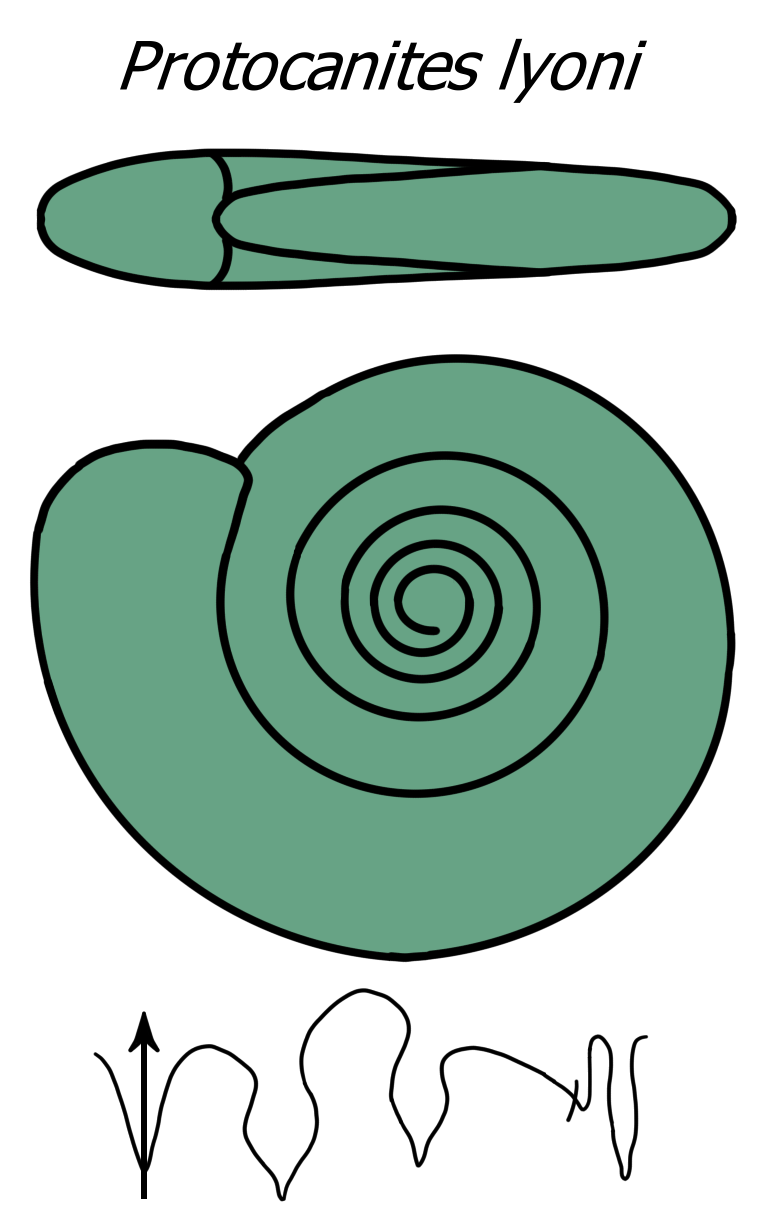
- Protocanites, a Tournaisian prolecanitoid in the family Prolecanitidae

Scientific classification
- Domain: Eukaryota
- Kingdom: Animalia
- Phylum: Mollusca
- Class: Cephalopoda
- Subclass: †Ammonoidea
- Order: †Prolecanitida; Miller & Furnish, 1954

Superfamilies
- Prolecanitoidea; Medlicottioidea

= Prolecanitida =

Prolecanitida Temporal range: Early Carboniferous–Early Triassic

Extinct order of molluscs

Prolecanitida is an order of extinct ammonoid cephalopods, the major Late Paleozoic group of ammonoids alongside the order Goniatitida. Prolecanitids had narrow shells, discoidal (disc-shaped) to thinly lenticular (lens-shaped). They retained a retrochoanitic siphuncle, a simple form with septal necks extending backwards. As is typical for ammonoids, the siphuncle sits along the ventral margin of the shell.

Prolecanitids form a relatively small and stable order within the Ammonoidea, with 43 named genera and about 1250 species. They were a long-ranging lineage, surviving for about 108 m.y. stretching from the Devonian–Carboniferous boundary to the Early Triassic. Although not as diverse as their goniatitid contemporaries, the Prolecanitida provided the stock from which all later Mesozoic ammonoids were derived.

Most prolecanitids had goniatitic sutures. The sutures start at a narrow ventral lobe, which can range from undivided to tridentate (three-pointed). The saddles are generally rounded, with the first umbilical (or second lateral) saddle often the largest in the suture line. The lobes are usually pointed, though members of the family Daraelitidae acquire a few finely serrated lobes (as characteristic for ceratitic sutures). The first lateral saddle is proportionally small, though its corresponding lateral lobe is broad and typically bifid (two-pointed).

== Evolution and phylogeny ==
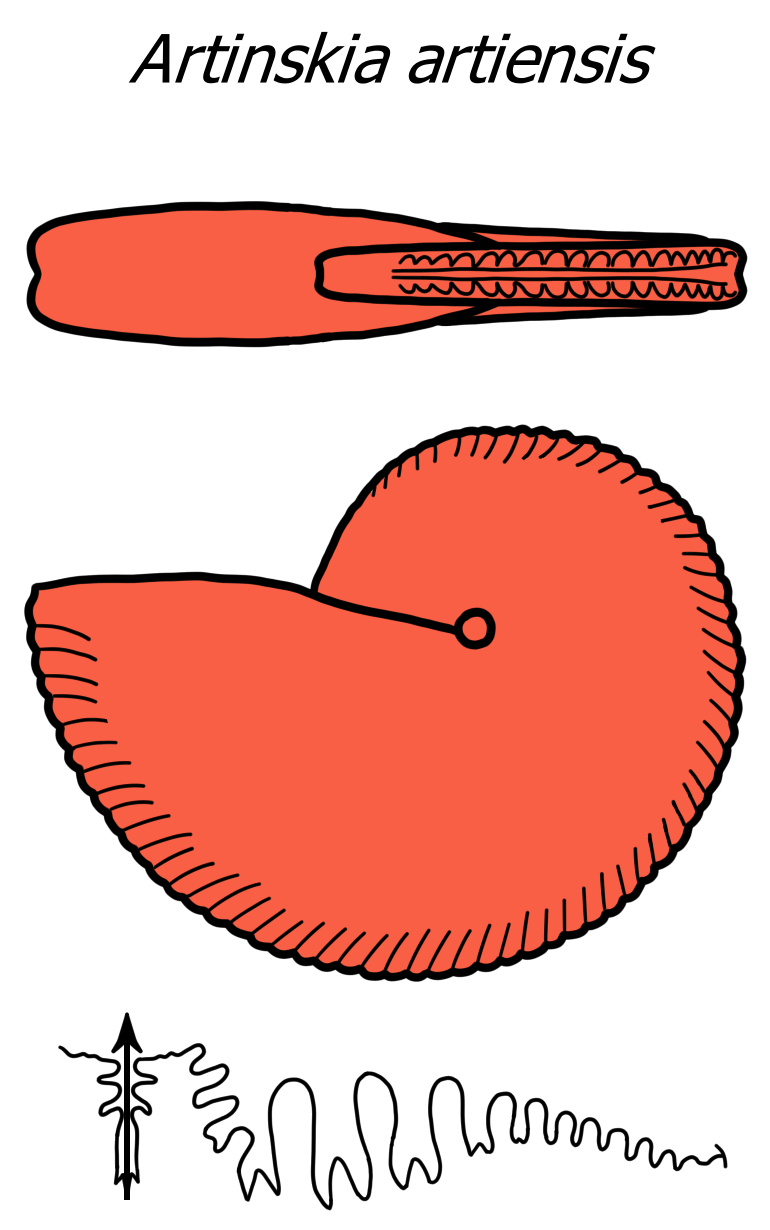
Artinskia, an Artinskian medlicottioid in the family Medlicottiidae

The origin of the Prolecanitida may be found in the Prolobitidae, a family which was originally included in the Anarcestida but recently removed to the Goniatitida. Following their inception, the Prolecanitida divided into two lineages, ranked as superfamilies. In the earlier (Lower Mississippian – Middle Permian) Prolecanitoidea, the shells are fairly smooth and characteristically have a large umbilicus and a generally evolute form. In the later (Upper Mississippian – Triassic) Medlicottioidea, the umbilicus is small, shells tend to be involute, and there is moderate sculpture along the flanks.

The oldest known prolecanitids were the family Prolecanitidae, which appeared around the Devonian–Carboniferous boundary and diversified in the Tournaisian stage. One of the most basal members of the order was Protocanites, which has been (likely erroneously) reported from the latest Devonian Louisiana Limestone of Missouri. The prolecanitoid family Daraelitidae is the probable source for the order Ceratitida, beginning with the family Xenodiscidae in the Middle Permian. Not counting their ceratite descendants, the youngest known prolecanitids were Episageceras and Latisageceras, two Early Triassic medlicottioid genera in the subfamily Episageceratinae.

Prolecanitids showed long-term, gradual changes in shell geometry. Likewise, they utilized a more limited set of available forms (a smaller morphospace) as compared to the dominant goniatitids. Prolecanitid genera averaged 14.7 million years in duration, as compared to 5.7 million years for Upper Carboniferous goniatitids.

Suture morphology in the Prolecanitida changed dramatically over time, from very simple sutures in the earliest genera to much more complex-sutured genera in the late Paleozoic. The increase in suture complexity over the 108 m.y. duration resulted from the iterative of addition of umbilical lobes, increasing serration of lobes, and the subdivision of lateral and ventral lobes. As many as 12–15 replicate, U-shaped umbilical lobes were added to the sutures during both ontogeny and phylogeny, originating at the umbilicus and migrating outward across the flanks.

Suture patterns in Prolecanitida evolved differently than in the Goniatitda, by increasing the number of umbilical lobes rather than by subdivision of the lateral saddle. Moreover, the body chamber in Prolecanitida was comparatively short, taking up only about half of the largest whorl. This complicates the question of the relationship between the Goniatitida and the Prolecanitida and their Mesozoic descendants.
