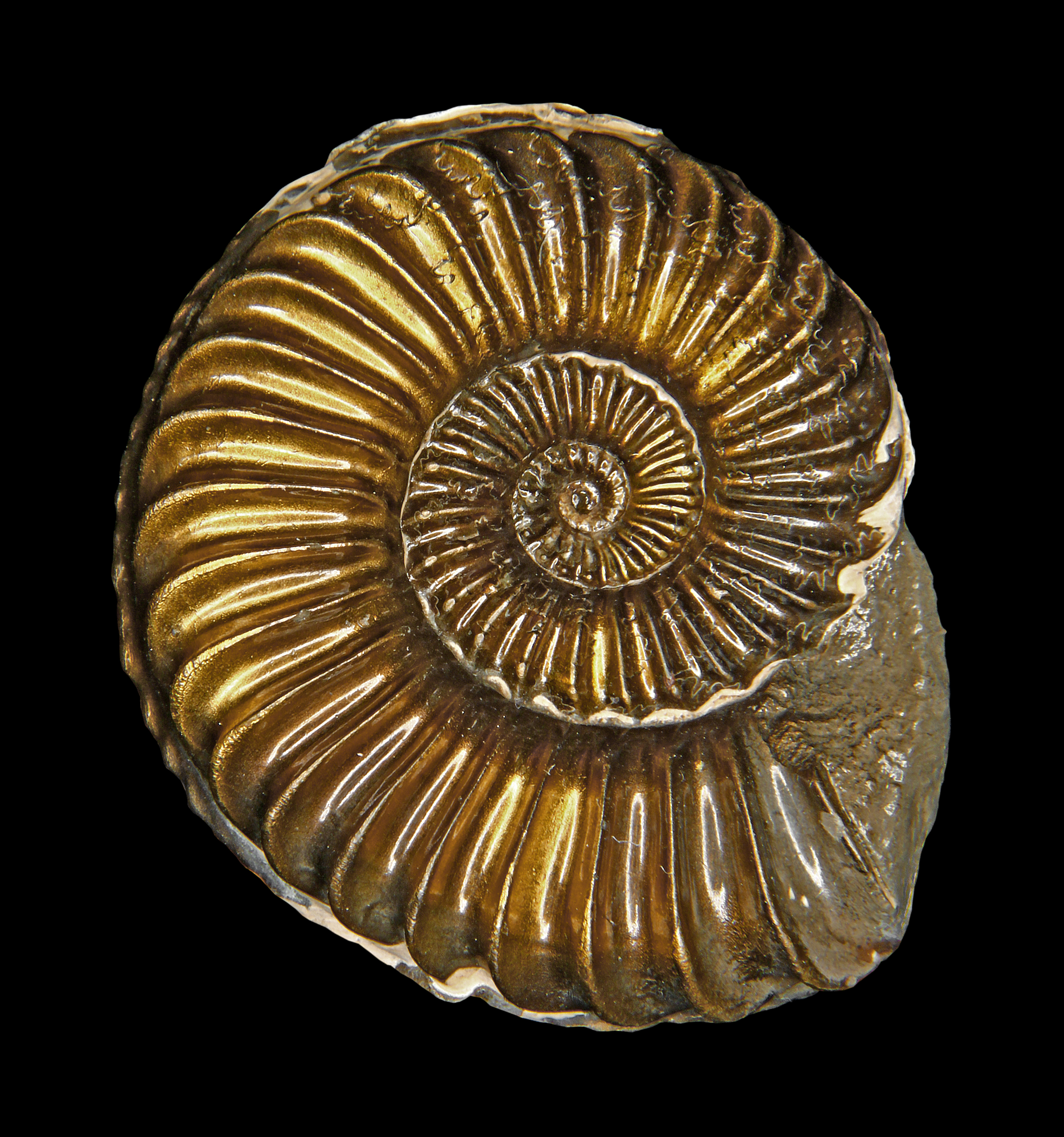
- Specimen of Pleuroceras solare, from the Lower Jurassic of Bavaria, Germany

Scientific classification
- Kingdom: Animalia
- Phylum: Mollusca
- Class: Cephalopoda
- Clade: Neocephalopoda
- Subclass: †Ammonoidea; Zittel, 1884

Orders
- †Agoniatitida; †Ammonitida; †Ceratitida; †Clymeniida; †Goniatitida; †Prolecanitida

= Ammonoidea =

Ammonoids Temporal range: 409–66 Ma Early Devonian (Emsian) - earliest Paleocene (Danian)

Extinct subclass of cephalopod molluscs

Ammonoids are extinct, typically coiled-shelled cephalopods composing the subclass Ammonoidea. They are more closely related to living octopuses, squid, and cuttlefish (which compose the clade Coleoidea) than they are to nautiluses (family Nautilidae), which their shells resemble. The earliest ammonoids appeared during the Emsian stage of the Early Devonian, around 410-408 million years ago, with the last species vanishing during or soon after the Cretaceous–Paleogene extinction event approximately 66 million years ago. They are often called ammonites, which is most frequently used for members of the order Ammonitida, the only remaining group of ammonoids from the Jurassic up until their extinction.

Ammonoids exhibited considerable diversity over their evolutionary history, with over 10,000 species having been described. Ammonoids are excellent index fossils, and they have been frequently used to link rock layers in which a particular species or genus is found to specific geologic time periods. Their fossil shells usually take the form of planispirals, although some helically spiraled and nonspiraled forms (known as heteromorphs) have been found, primarily during the Cretaceous period. Because ammonites and their close relatives are extinct, little is known about their way of life. Their soft body parts are very rarely preserved in any detail. Nonetheless, much has been worked out by examining ammonoid shells and by using models of these shells in water tanks.

== Etymology ==
The name "ammonite", from which the scientific term is derived, was inspired by the spiral shape of their fossilized shells, which somewhat resemble tightly coiled rams' horns. Pliny the Elder (d. 79 AD near Pompeii) called fossils of these animals ammonis cornua ("horns of Ammon") because the Egyptian god Ammon (Amun) was typically depicted wearing rams' horns. Often, the name of an ammonite genus ends in -ceras, which is from ancient Greek κέρας (kéras) meaning "horn".

== Classification ==
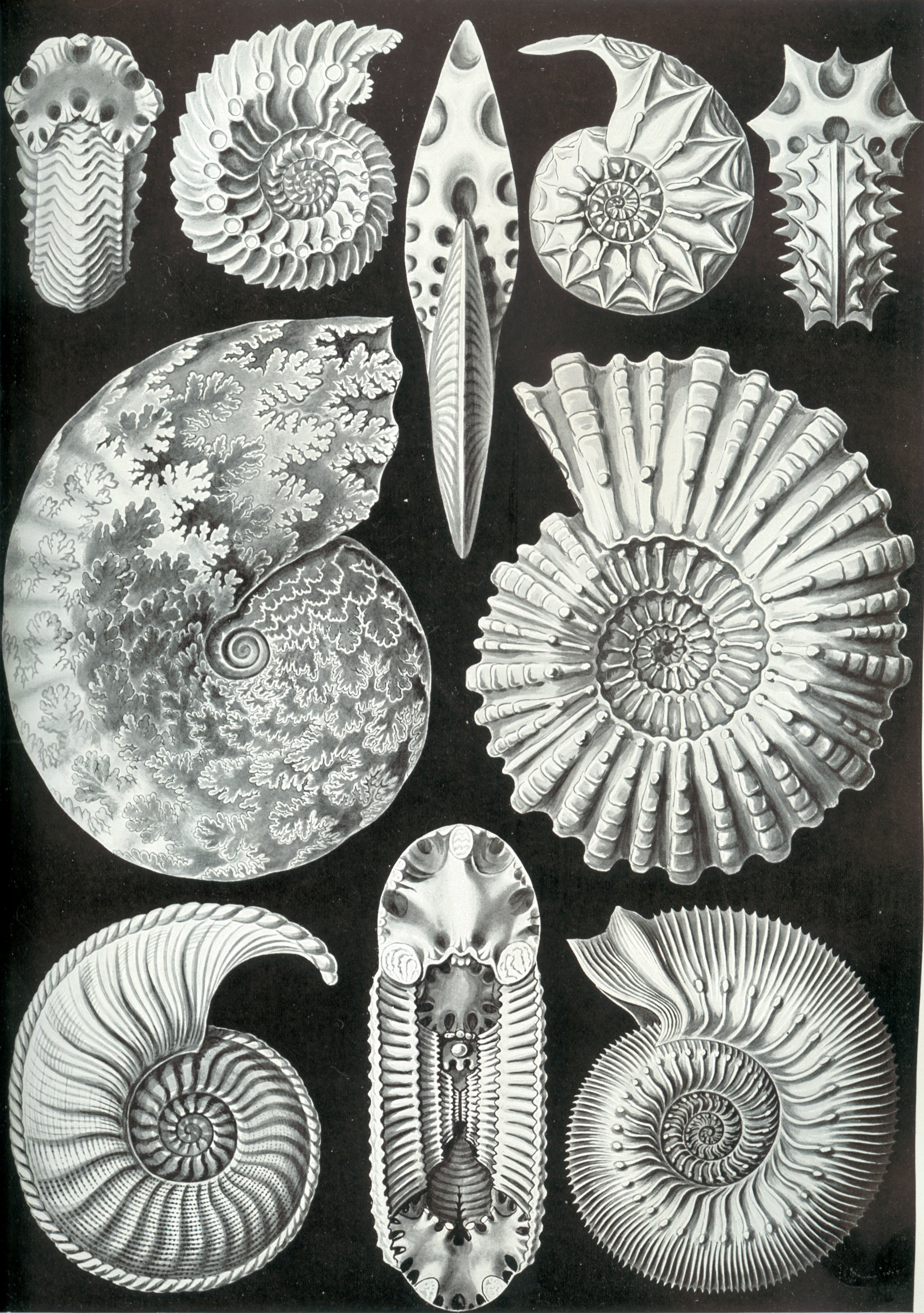
A variety of ammonite forms, from Ernst Haeckel's 1904 Kunstformen der Natur (Art Forms of Nature)

=== Orders and suborders ===
The Ammonoidea can be divided into six orders, listed here starting with the most primitive and going to the more derived:

- Agoniatitida, Lower Devonian – Middle Devonian
- Clymeniida, Upper Devonian
- Goniatitida, Middle Devonian – Upper Permian
- Prolecanitida, Upper Devonian – Upper Triassic
- Ceratitida, Upper Permian – Upper Triassic
- Ammonitida, Lower Jurassic – Lower Paleocene

In some classifications, these are left as suborders, included in only three orders: Goniatitida, Ceratitida and Ammonitida. The classification of ammonoids is based in part on the ornamentation and structure of the septa comprising their shells' gas chambers.

=== Taxonomy of the Treatise on Invertebrate Paleontology ===
The Treatise on Invertebrate Paleontology (Part L, 1957) divides the Ammonoidea, regarded simply as an order, into eight suborders, the Anarcestina, Clymeniina, Goniatitina and Prolecanitina from the Paleozoic; the Ceratitina from the Triassic; and the Ammonitina, Lytoceratina and Phylloceratina from the Jurassic and Cretaceous. In subsequent taxonomies, these are sometimes regarded as orders within the subclass Ammonoidea.

== Evolutionary history ==
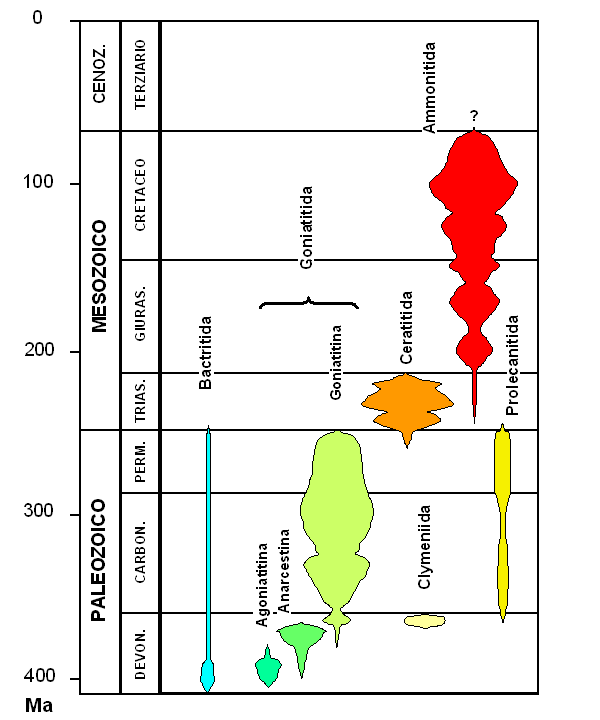
Scheme of the stratigraphical distribution of Ammonoidea

Ammonoids are widely thought to have originated from straight-shelled (orthocone) "nautiloids" belong to Bactritida during the early Devonian (Emsian) around 409-408 million years ago, with transitional fossils showing the transition from a straight shell, to a curved (cyrtoconic) shell to a relaxed (gyroconic) spiral and finally to a tight spiral. The Late Devonian mass extinction (Kellwasser event) at the end of the Frasnian led to a dramatic decline in ammonoid diversity, with only a handful of lineages belong to Tornoceratina (a subgroup of Goniatites) surviving, becoming ancestral to all later ammonoids. Ammonoids rediversified during the following Famennian, which also saw the radical shift of the siphuncle from a lower (ventral) to upper (dorsal) position. Ammonites were nearly completely exterminated by the Hangenberg Event (end-Devonian mass extinction) at the end of the Devonian, with only a handful of lineages surviving, with one of the surviving goniatite lineages becoming ancestral to all post-early Carboniferous and later ammonoids. Ammonoids again rediversified during the Early Carboniferous. During the Carboniferous ammonoids underwent alternating periods of diversification and decline, and during the late Carboniferous ammonoid diversity became concentrated in a few geographical regions.

During the Permian, the Capitanian mass extinction event severely reduced the diversity of Goniatitida and Prolecanitida, while the Ceratitida, which originated during the Middle Permian, likely from the Daraelitidae, was largely unaffected and radiated in the Late Permian, becoming the dominant group of ammonoids in this period represented by two groups, the araxoceratids and xenodiscids. The end-Permian mass extinction again reduced ammonoids to the verge of extinction, though both main ceratitid lineages survived, though the xenodiscids were more successful and ancestral to all later ammonoids.

Ammonites were devastated by the end-Triassic extinction, with only a handful of genera belonging to the family Psiloceratidae of the suborder Phylloceratina surviving and becoming ancestral to all later Jurassic and Cretaceous ammonites. Ammonites explosively diversified during the Early Jurassic, with the orders Psiloceratina, Ammonitina, Lytoceratina, Haploceratina, Perisphinctina and Ancyloceratina all appearing during the Jurassic. Heteromorph ammonites (ammonites with open or non-spiral coiling) of the order Ancyloceratina became common during the Cretaceous period.

At least 57 species of ammonites, which were widespread and belonged to six superfamilies, were extant during the last 500,000 years of the Cretaceous, indicating that ammonites remained highly diverse until the very end of their existence. All ammonites were wiped out during or shortly after the K-Pg extinction event, caused by the Chicxulub impact. It has been suggested that ocean acidification generated by the impact played a key role in their extinction, as the larvae of ammonites were likely small and planktonic, and would have been heavily affected. Nautiloids, exemplified by modern nautiluses, are conversely thought to have had a reproductive strategy in which eggs were laid in smaller batches many times during the lifespan, and on the sea floor well away from any direct effects of such a bolide strike, and thus survived. Many ammonite species were filter feeders, so they might have been particularly susceptible to marine faunal turnovers and climatic change. Some reports suggest that a few ammonite species, including those belonging to the genera Hoploscaphites, Baculites and Fresvillia, may have persisted into the very early Danian stage of the Paleocene, with those found in the Cerithium Limestone of Denmark suggested to have survived at least 68,000 and up to a maximum of 200,000 years after the K-Pg extinction event (marked by Fiskeler), before going extinct.

== Description ==
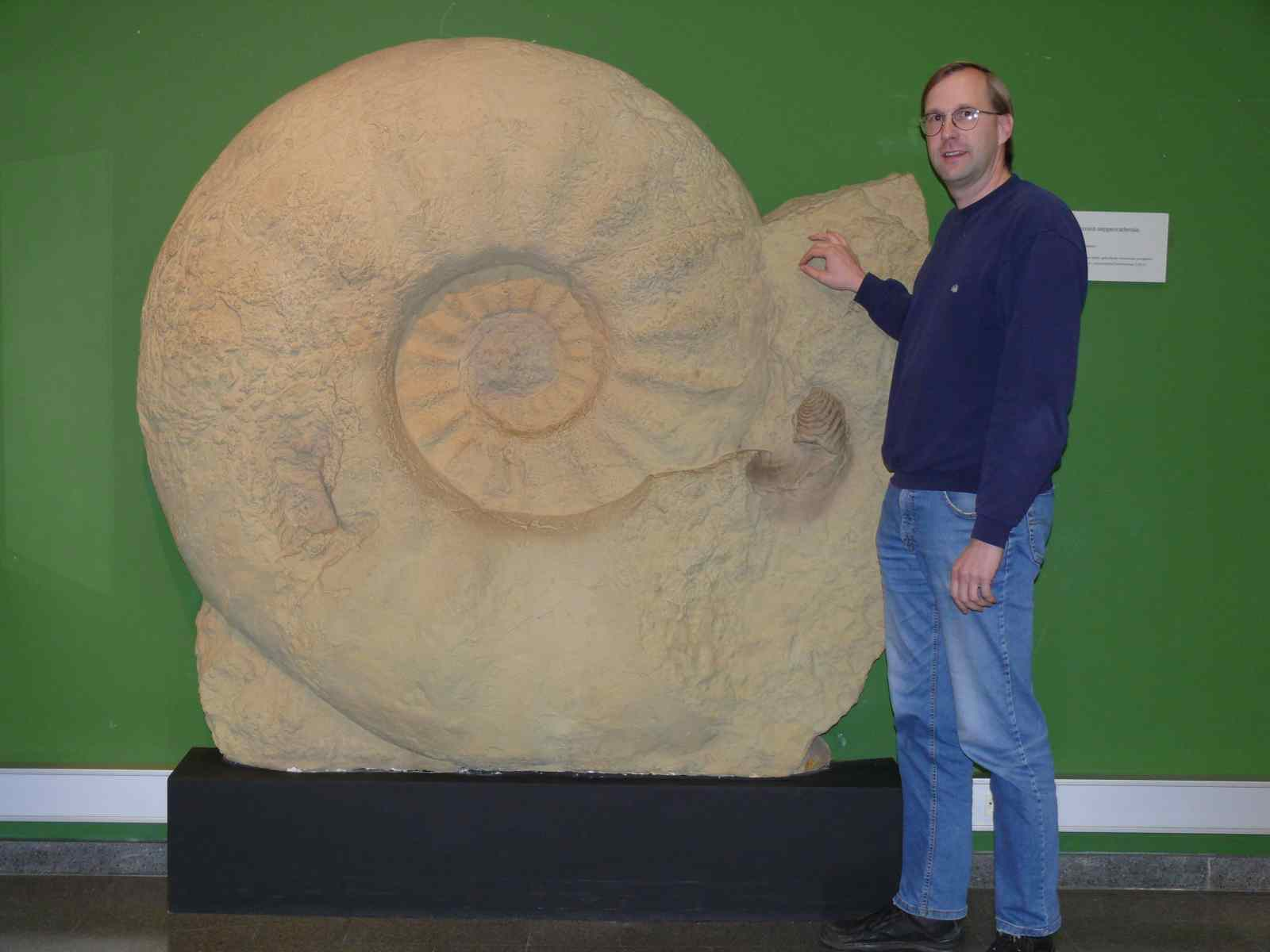
Fossil of Parapuzosia seppenradensis, one of the largest known ammonites

=== Size ===
The smallest ammonoid was Maximites from the Upper Carboniferous. Adult specimens reached only 10 mm (0.39 in) in shell diameter. Few of the ammonites occurring in the lower and middle part of the Jurassic period reached a size exceeding 23 cm (9.1 in) in diameter. Much larger forms are found in the later rocks of the upper part of the Jurassic and the lower part of the Cretaceous, such as Titanites from the Portland Stone of Jurassic of southern England, which is often 53 cm (1.74 ft) in diameter, and Parapuzosia seppenradensis of the Cretaceous period of Germany, which is one of the largest-known ammonites, sometimes reaching 2 m (6.6 ft) in diameter. The largest-documented North American ammonite is Parapuzosia bradyi from the Cretaceous, with specimens measuring 137 cm (4.5 ft) in diameter.

=== Basic shell anatomy ===
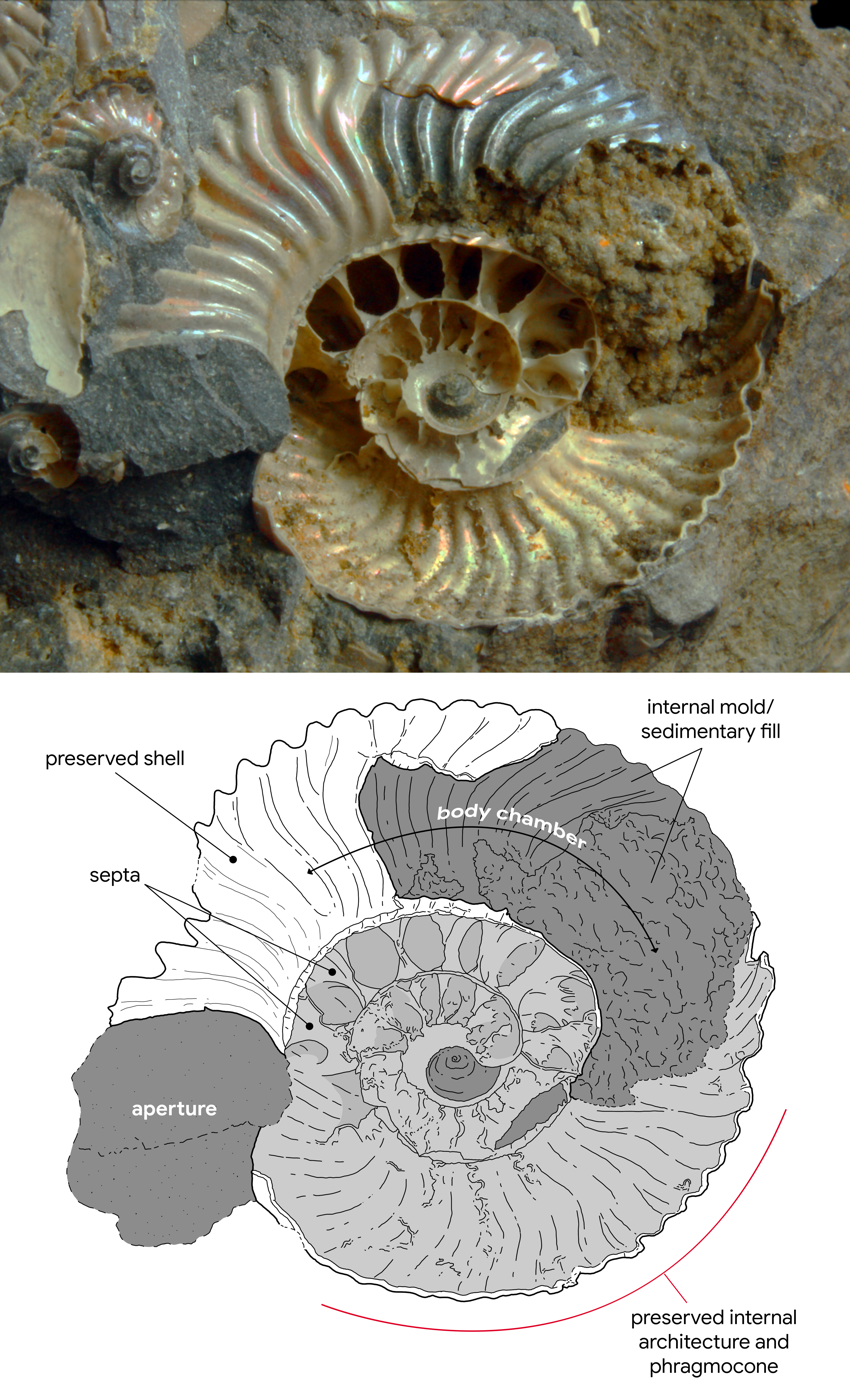
Quenstedtoceras specimen featuring septa shell (top) and labelled diagram (bottom)

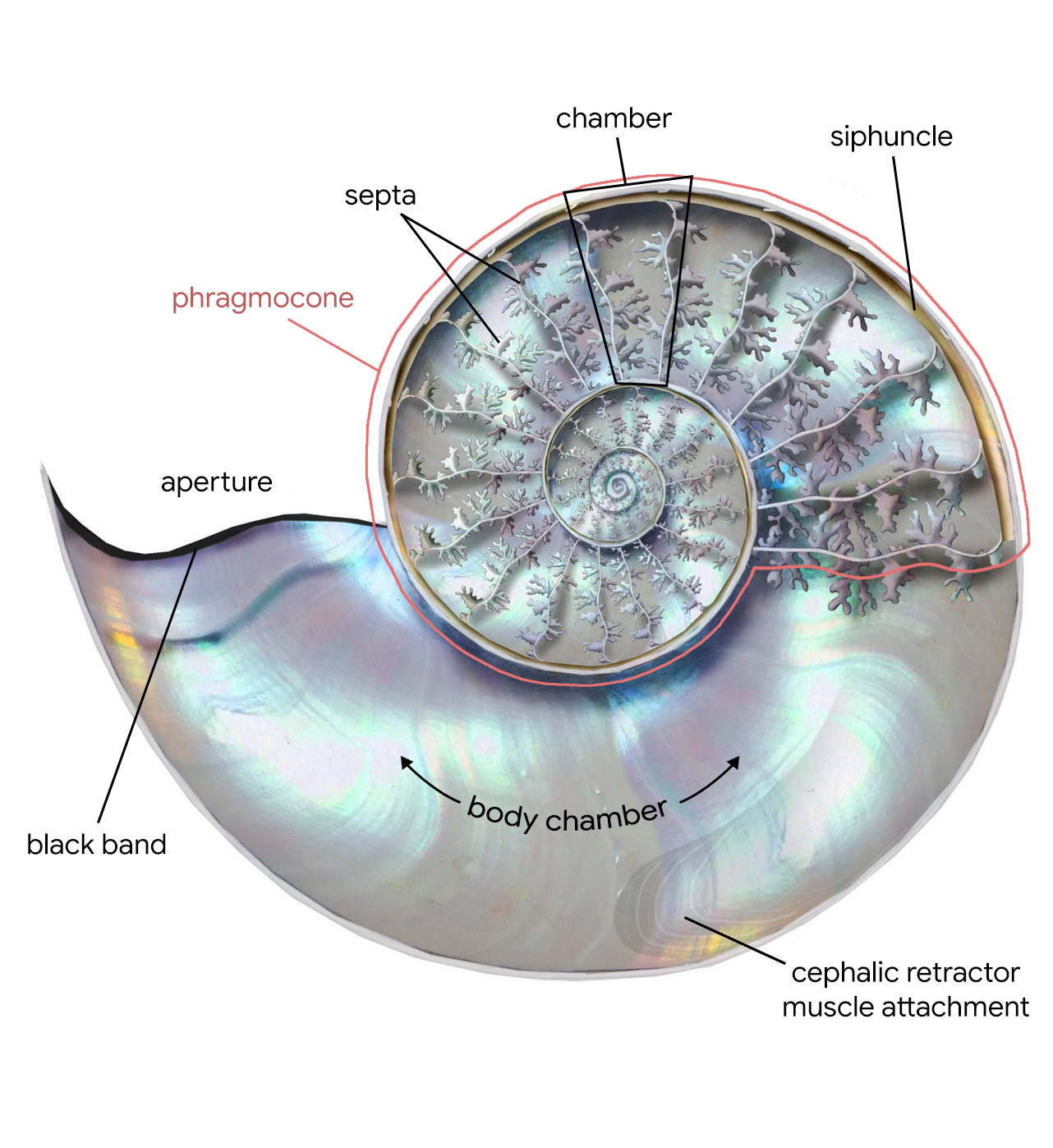
Reconstruction of the internal shell of Neochetoceras

The chambered part of the ammonite shell is called a phragmocone. It contains a series of progressively larger chambers, called camerae (sing. camera) that are divided by thin walls called septa (sing. septum). Only the last and largest chamber, the body chamber, was occupied by the living animal at any given moment. As it grew, it added newer and larger chambers to the open end of the coil. Where the outer whorl of an ammonite shell largely covers the preceding whorls, the specimen is said to be involute (e.g., Anahoplites). Where it does not cover those preceding, the specimen is said to be evolute (e.g., Dactylioceras). A thin living tube called a siphuncle passed through the septa, extending from the ammonite's body into the empty shell chambers. Through a hyperosmotic active transport process, the ammonite emptied water out of these shell chambers. This enabled it to control the buoyancy of the shell and thereby rise or descend in the water column. A primary difference between ammonites and nautiloids is the siphuncle of ammonites (excepting Clymeniina) runs along the ventral periphery of the septa and camerae (i.e., the inner surface of the outer axis of the shell), while the siphuncle of nautiloids runs more or less through the center of the septa and camerae.

=== Siphuncle ===
The siphuncle in most ammonoids is a narrow tubular structure that runs along the shell's outer rim, known as the venter, connecting the chambers of the phragmocone to the body or living chamber. This distinguishes them from living nautiloides (Nautilus and Allonautilus) and typical Nautilida, in which the siphuncle runs through the center of each chamber. However the very earliest nautiloids from the Late Cambrian and Ordovician typically had ventral siphuncles like ammonites, although often proportionally larger and more internally structured. The word "siphuncle" comes from the Neo-Latin siphunculus, meaning "little siphon".

=== Septa and suture patterns ===
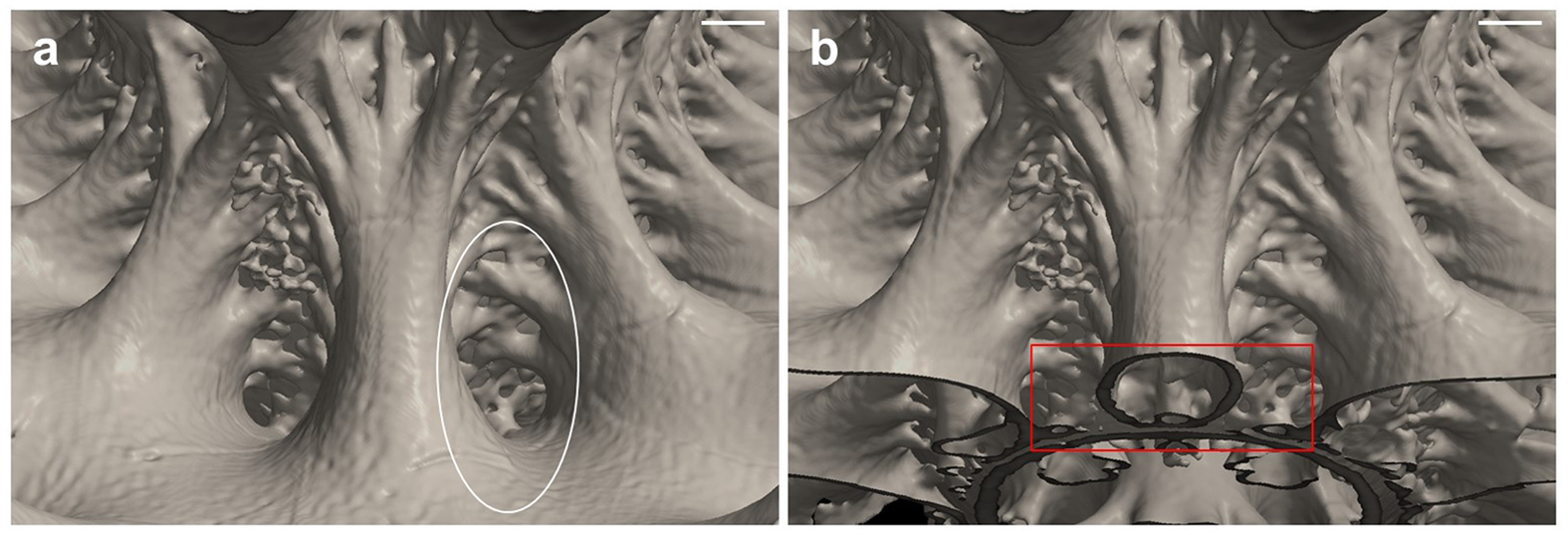
Septa of Damesites, featuring a tubular structure and ammonitic pattern in their sutures

Ammonites (subclass Ammonoidea) can be distinguished by their septa, the dividing walls that separate the chambers in the phragmocone, by the nature of their sutures where the septa join the outer shell wall, and in general by their siphuncles.

Ammonoid septa characteristically have bulges and indentations and are to varying degrees convex when seen from the front, distinguishing them from nautiloid septa, which are typically simple concave, dish-shaped structures. The topology of the septa, especially around the rim, results in the various suture patterns found. The septal curvature in nautiloids and ammonoids also differ in that the septa curves towards the opening in nautiloids, and away from the opening in ammоnoids. While nearly all nautiloids show gently curving sutures, the ammonoid suture line (the intersection of the septum with the outer shell) is variably folded, forming saddles ("peaks" that point towards the aperture) and lobes ("valleys" which point away from the aperture). The suture line has four main regions.

The external or ventral region refers to sutures along the lower (outer) edge of the shell, where the left and right suture lines meet. The external (or ventral) saddle, when present, lies directly on the lower midline of the shell. As a result, it is often called the median saddle. On suture diagrams the median saddle is supplied with an arrow which points towards the aperture. The median saddle is edged by fairly small external (or ventral) lobes. The earliest ammonoids lacked a median saddle and instead had a single midline ventral lobe, which in later forms is split into two or more components.

The lateral region involves the first saddle and lobe pair past the external region as the suture line extends up the side of the shell. The lateral saddle and lobe are usually larger than the ventral saddle and lobe. Additional lobes developing towards the inner edge of a whorl are labelled umbilical lobes, which increase in number through ammonoid evolution as well as an individual ammonoid's development. In many cases the distinction between the lateral and umbilical regions are unclear; new umbilical features can develop from subdivisions of other umbilical features, or from subdivisions of lateral features. Lobes and saddles which are so far towards the center of the whorl that they are covered up by succeeding whorls are labelled internal (or dorsal) lobes and saddles.

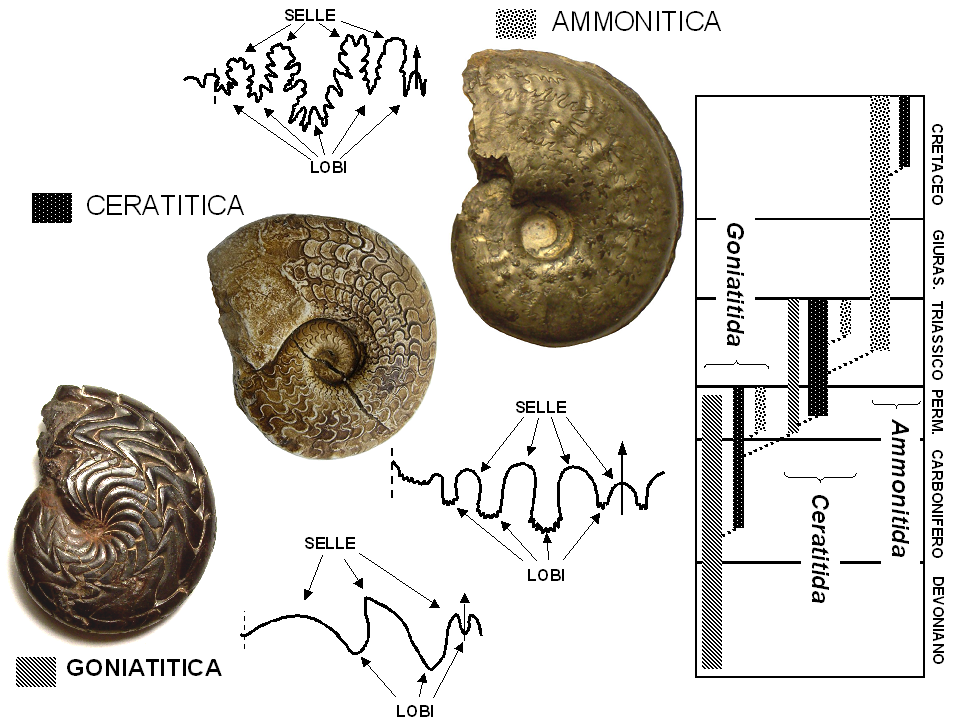
The three major types of suture patterns found in Ammonoidea: goniatitic, ceratitic, and ammonitic

Three major types of suture patterns are found in the Ammonoidea:

- Goniatitic – numerous undivided lobes and saddles. This pattern is characteristic of the Paleozoic ammonoids (orders Agoniatitida, Clymeniida, Goniatitida, and Prolecanitida).
- Ceratitic – lobes have subdivided tips, giving them a saw-toothed appearance. The saddles are rounded and undivided. This suture pattern is characteristic of Triassic ammonoids in the order Ceratitida. This pattern convergently re-evolved in the Cretaceous engonoceratid ammonites, commonly referred to as "pseudoceratites".
- Ammonitic – lobes and saddles are much subdivided (fluted); subdivisions are usually rounded instead of saw-toothed. Ammonoids of this type are the most important species from a biostratigraphical point of view. This suture type is characteristic of Jurassic and Cretaceous ammonoids, but extends back all the way to the Permian.

=== Shell shapes ===
The majority of ammonite species feature planispiral shells, tightly coiled in a flat plane. The most fundamental difference in spiral form is how strongly successive whorls expand and overlap their predecessors. This can be inferred by the size of the umbilicus, the sunken-in inner part of the coil, exposing older and smaller whorls. Evolute shells have very little overlap, a large umbilicus, and many exposed whorls. Involute shells have strong overlap, a small umbilicus, and only the largest and most recent whorls are exposed. Shell structure can be broken down further by the width of the shell, with implications for hydrodynamic efficiency.

Major shell forms include:

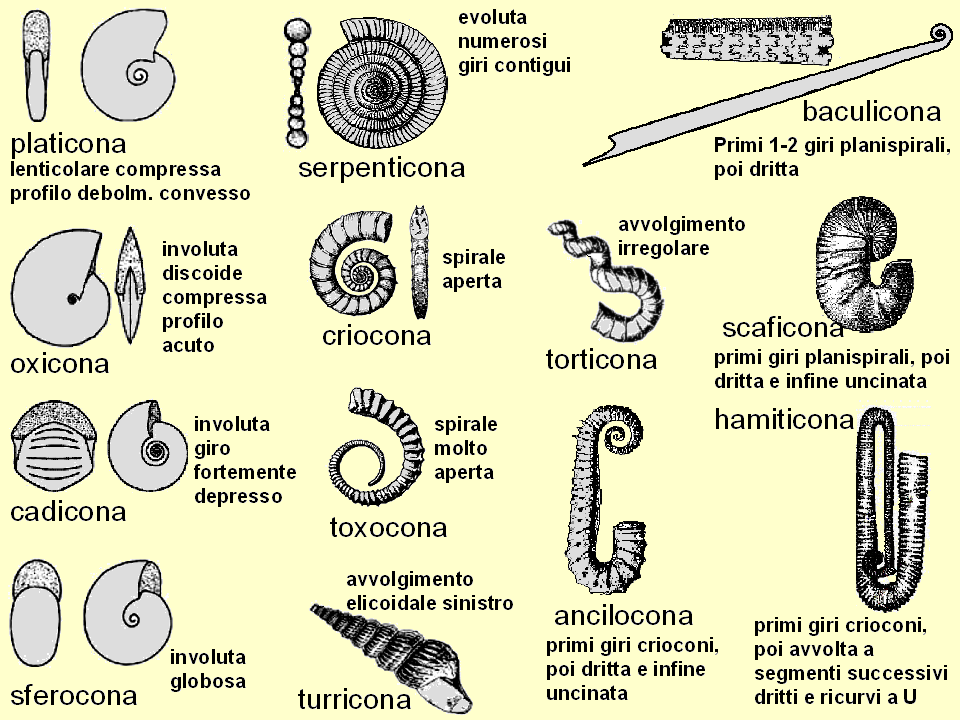
Several shell shapes of ammonoids and their sections

- Oxycone – Strongly involute and very narrow, with sharp ventral keels and a streamlined, lenticular (lens-shaped) cross-section. These ammonoids are estimated to be nektonic (well-adapted to rapid active swimming), as their shell form incurs very little drag and allows for efficient, stable coasting even in turbulent flow regimes.
- Serpenticone – Strongly evolute and fairly narrow (discoidal) in width. Historically assumed to be primarily planktonic (free-floating drifters), a nektonic lifestyle is also plausible for many species. Thanks to their flattened shape, these ammonoids accelerate effectively, though their large umbilicus introduces more drag in successive thrusts. Relative to oxycones, serpenticones take less effort to rotate around the transverse axis (pitch). Serpenticone ammonites resemble coiled snakes and are abundant in the Jurassic rocks of Europe. Carved serpenticones fulfill the role of the "snakestones" in medieval folklore.
- Spherocone – Moderately involute and quite broad, globular (nearly spherical) in overall shape. Their semi-spherical shape is the most efficient for moving in laminar water (with a low Reynolds number) or migrating vertically through the water column. Though less hydrodynamically stable than other forms, this may be advantageous in certain situations, as spherocones can easily rotate around both the transverse axis and the vertical axis (yaw).
- Platycone – Intermediate between serpenticones and oxycones: narrow and moderately involute.
- Discocone – Intermediate between oxycones and spherocones: involute and moderately broad. The modern Nautilus is an example of a discocone cephalopod.
- Planorbicone – Intermediate between serpenticones and spherocones: Moderately broad, evolute to involute. Wider and more involute ammonoids on the serpenticone-spherocone spectrum are termed Cadicones.

Ammonites vary greatly in the ornamentation (surface relief) of their shells. Some may be smooth and relatively featureless, except for growth lines, resembling that of the modern Nautilus. In others, various patterns of spiral ridges, ribs, nodes, or spines are presented. This type of complex ornamentation of the shell is especially evident in the later ammonites of the Cretaceous.

==== Shell shapes in heteromorphs ====
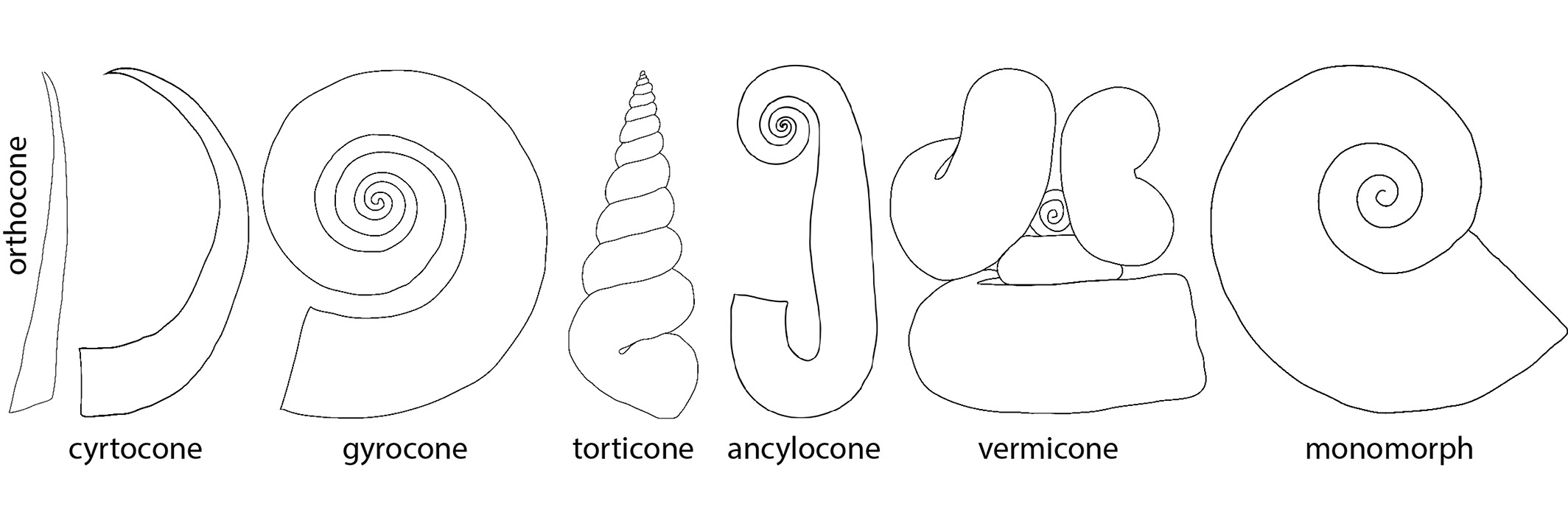
Several shell shapes of heteromorph ammonoids

Ammonoids with a shell shape diverging from the typical planispiral form are known as heteromorphs, instead forming a conch with detached whorls (open coiling) or non-planispiral coiling. These types of shells evolved four times in ammonoids, with the first forms appearing already in the Devonian period. In late Norian age in Triassic the first heteromorph ammonoid fossils belongs to the genus Rhabdoceras. The three other heteromorphic genera were Hannaoceras, Cochloceras and Choristoceras. All of them went extinct at the end of Triassic. In the Jurassic an uncoiled shell was found in the Spiroceratoidea, but by the end of Cretaceous the only heteromorph ammonites remaining belonged to the suborder Ancyloceratina. One example is Baculites, which has a nearly straight shell convergent with the older orthocone nautiloids. Still other species' shells are coiled helically (in two dimensions), similar in appearance to some gastropods (e.g., Turrilites and Bostrychoceras). Some species' shells are even initially uncoiled, then partially coiled, and finally straight at maturity (as in Australiceras).

Perhaps the most extreme and bizarre-looking example of a heteromorph is Nipponites, which appears to be a tangle of irregular whorls lacking any obvious symmetric coiling. Upon closer inspection, though, the shell proves to be a three-dimensional network of connected "U" shapes. Nipponites occurs in rocks of the upper part of the Cretaceous in Japan and the United States.

=== Aptychus ===
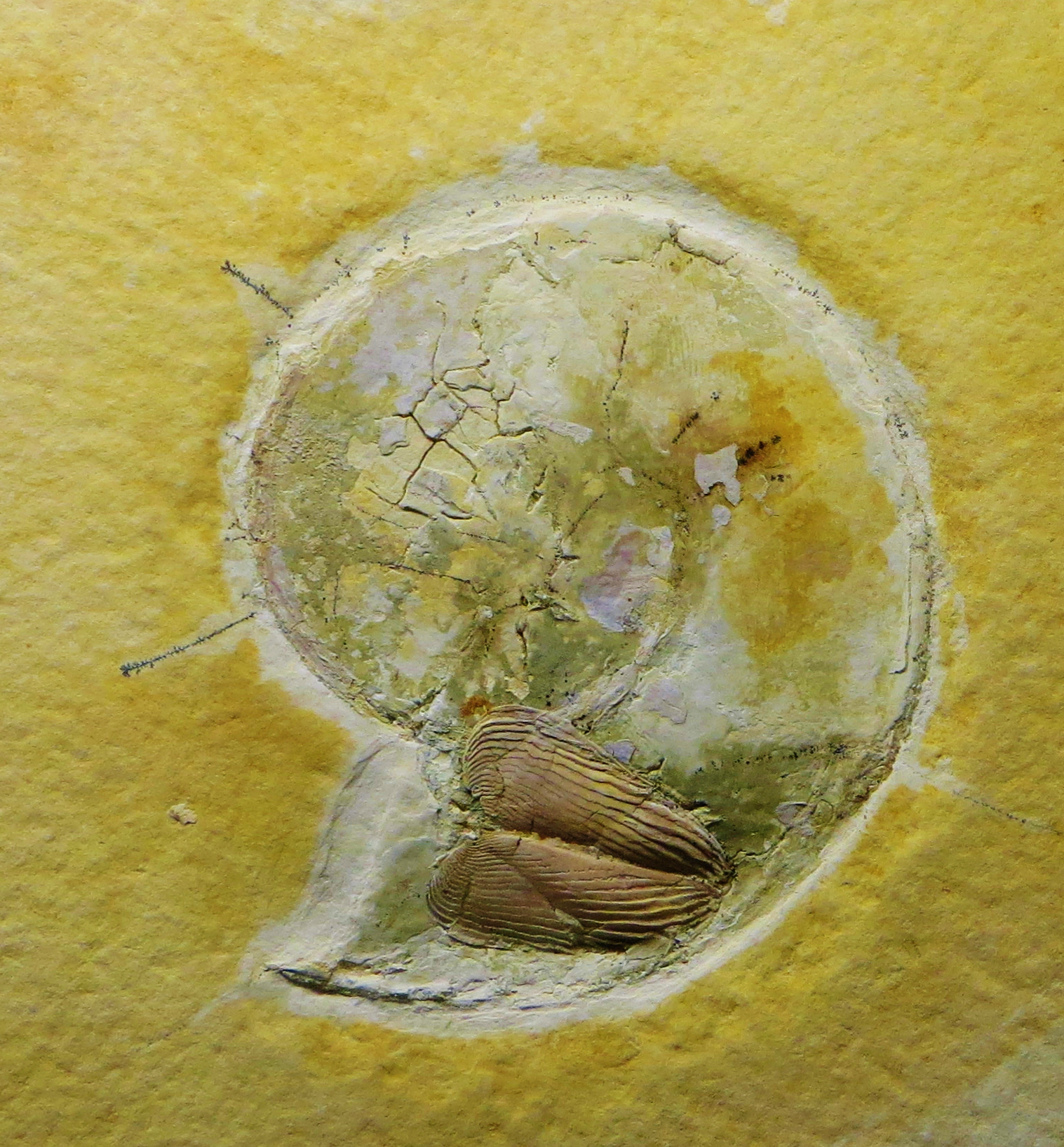
Oppelia in association with its aptychi plates

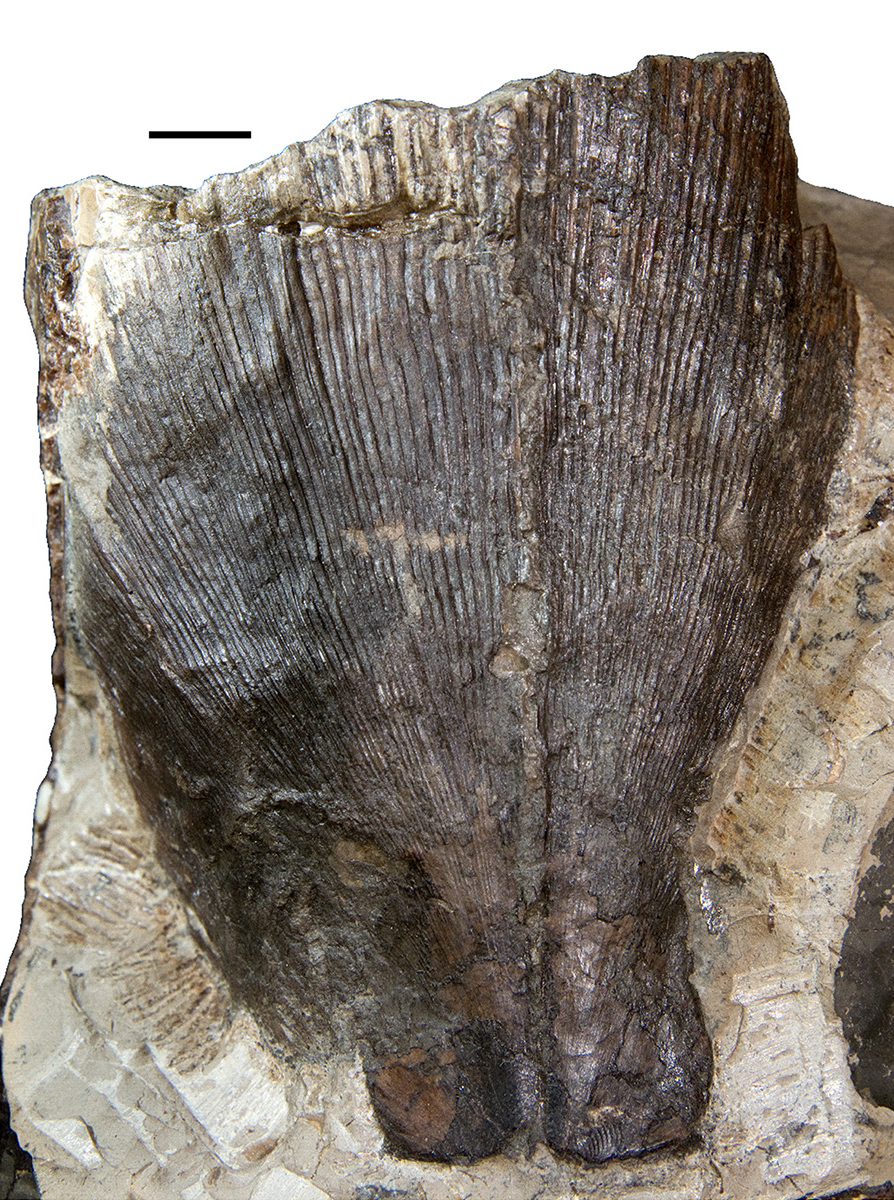
Jaw apparatus of Aegocrioceras preserving traces of the radula

Some ammonites have been found in association with a single horny plate or a pair of calcitic plates. In the past, these plates were assumed to serve in closing the opening of the shell in much the same way as an operculum, but more recently they are postulated to have been a jaw apparatus.

The plates are collectively termed the aptychus or aptychi in the case of a pair of plates, and anaptychus in the case of a single plate. The paired aptychi were symmetric to one another and equal in size and appearance.

Anaptychi are relatively rare as fossils. They are found representing ammonites from the Devonian period through those of the Cretaceous period.

Calcified aptychi only occur in ammonites from the Mesozoic era. They are almost always found detached from the shell, and are only very rarely preserved in place. Still, sufficient numbers have been found closing the apertures of fossil ammonite shells as to leave no doubt as to their identity as part of the anatomy of an ammonite.

Large numbers of detached aptychi occur in certain beds of rock (such as those from the Mesozoic in the Alps). These rocks are usually accumulated at great depths. The modern Nautilus lacks any calcitic plate for closing its shell, and only one extinct nautiloid genus is known to have borne anything similar. Nautilus does, however, have a leathery head shield (the hood) which it uses to cover the opening when it retreats inside.

There are many forms of aptychus, varying in shape and the sculpture of the inner and outer surfaces, but because they are so rarely found in position within the shell of the ammonite it is often unclear to which species of ammonite one kind of aptychus belongs. A number of aptychi have been given their own genus and even species names independent of their unknown owners' genus and species, pending future discovery of verified occurrences within ammonite shells.

== Soft tissue ==
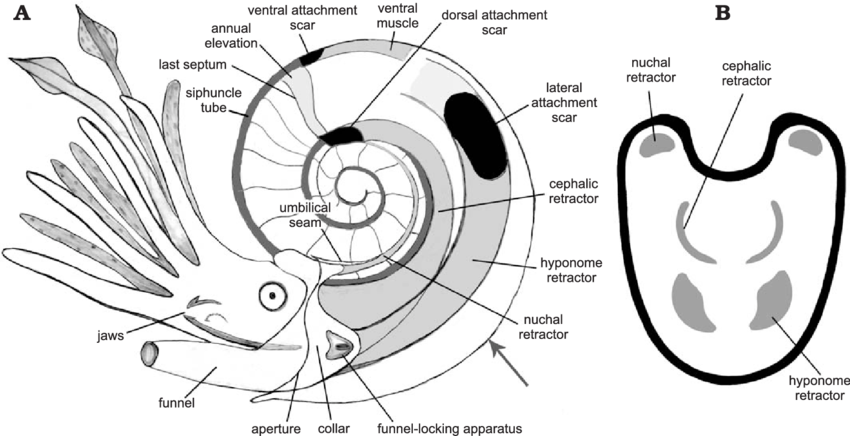
Ammonite muscular system reconstructed after specimens with muscular impressions and other cephalopods. The shape and length of tentacles are speculative

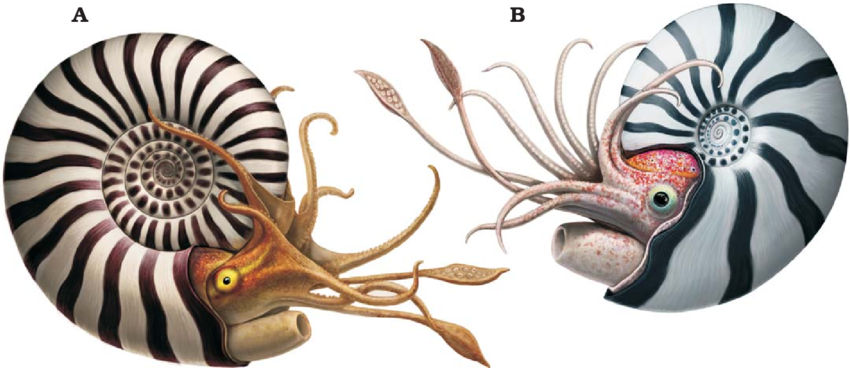
Speculative life restorations of the craspeditid ammonites Garniericeras catenulatum (left) and Kachpurites fulgens (right)

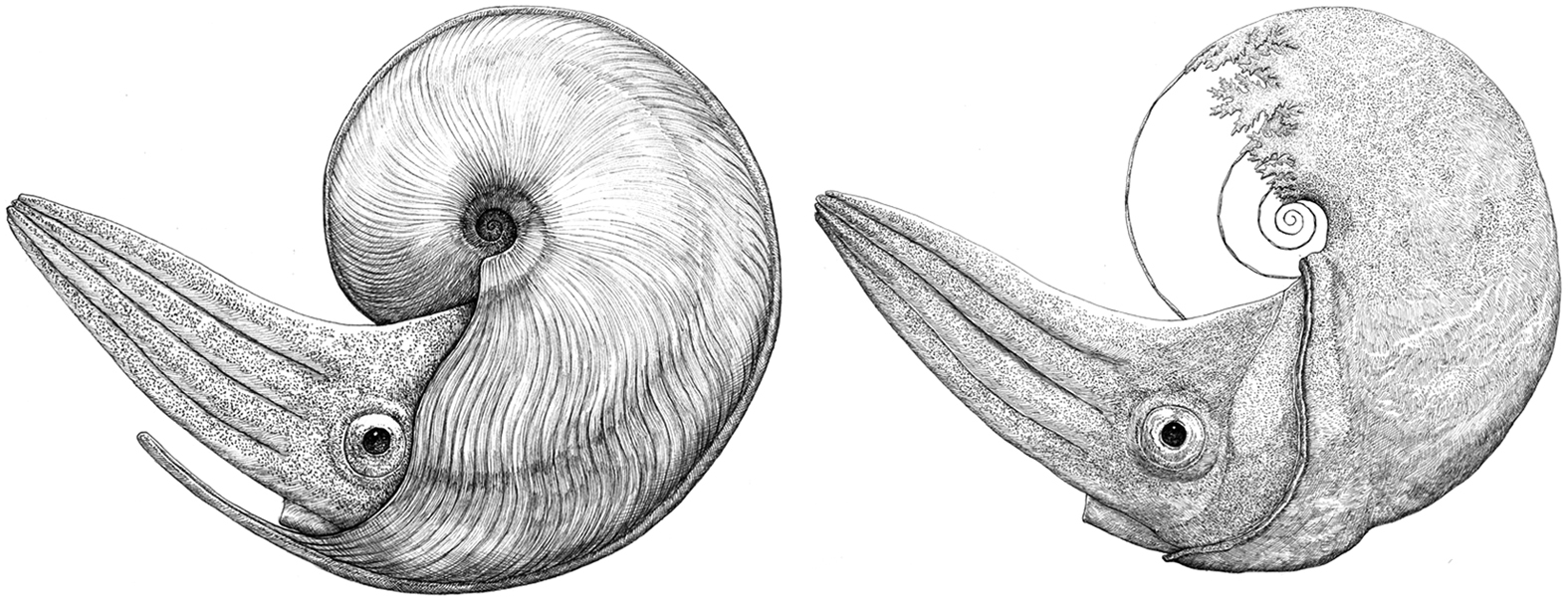
Reconstruction of Damesites showing the internal soft tissue and the branching of the rear mantle that follows the shape of the septa

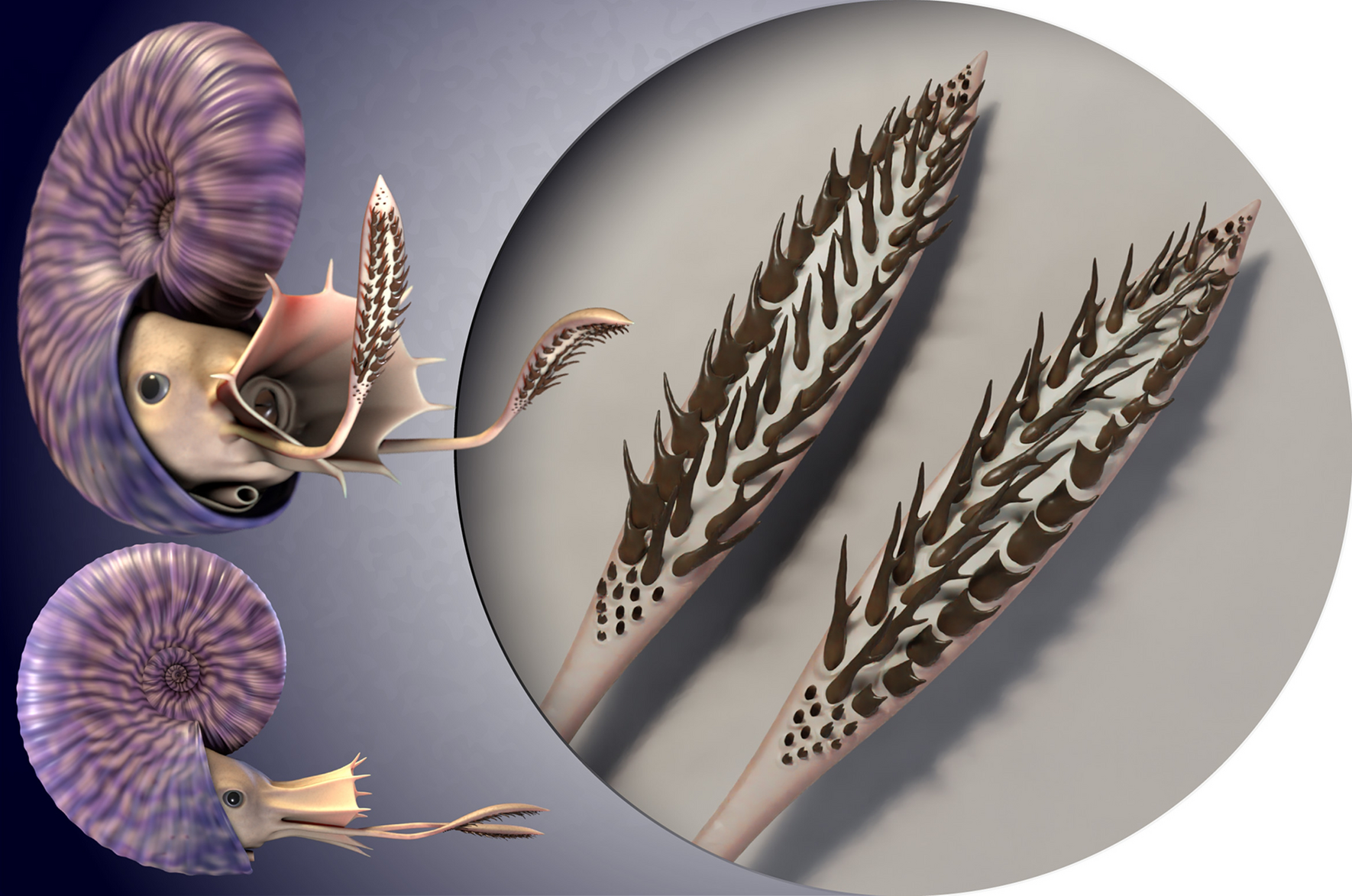
Life restoration of Rhaeboceras, which had a pair of tentacles tipped with hooks, largely unique among ammonites

Although ammonites do occur in exceptional lagerstatten such as the Solnhofen Limestone, their soft-part record is surprisingly sparse. Beyond a tentative ink sac and possible digestive organs, no soft parts were known until 2021. In this year an isolated specimen showing some of the internal soft anatomy including organs was described. When neutron imaging was used on a fossil found in 1998, part of the musculature became visible and showed they were able to retract themselves into the shell for protection, and that the retractor muscles and hyponome that work together to enable jet propulsion in nautilus worked independently in ammonites. The soft body of the creature occupied the largest segments of the shell at the end of the coil. The smaller earlier segments were walled off and the animal could maintain its buoyancy by filling them with gas. Thus, the smaller sections of the coil would have floated above the larger sections. The reproductive organs show possible traces of spermatophores, which would support the hypothesis that the microconchs were males. They likely bore a radula and beak, and marginal siphuncle. They operated by direct development with sexual reproduction, were carnivorous, and had a crop for food storage. They are unlikely to have dwelt in fresh or brackish water. Many ammonites were likely filter feeders, so adaptations associated with this lifestyle like sieves probably occurred.

A 2021 study reported specimens of the scaphitid ammonite genera Rhaeboceras and Hoploscaphites with mineralised hooks, which were likely present on the ends of a pair of enlarged tentacles. However, these mineralised hooks appear to be present only in scaphitids and were not typical of ammonites as a whole. The number of arms has been a subject of speculation, with different artists either opting for a nautilus-like restoration with many arms, or a more squid-like restoration with fewer arms, with a 1996 study suggesting they had 10 arms like modern squid. Paleontologist Mark Witton has stated that "The basic details of ammonite life appearance are far from clear . . . While we can be certain that a squid-like organism lived in the last chamber of their shells . . . little else can be said with certainty about their appearance. ... Despite being creatures which occur so commonly as fossils that it seems like we should know everything about them, ammonites are creatures fraught with uncertainty for artists and palaeontologists alike. Until new data comes to light, all life reconstructions of ammonites should be taken as extremely tentative, almost speculative renditions of their actual appearance."

== Paleobiology ==
=== Sexual dimorphism ===
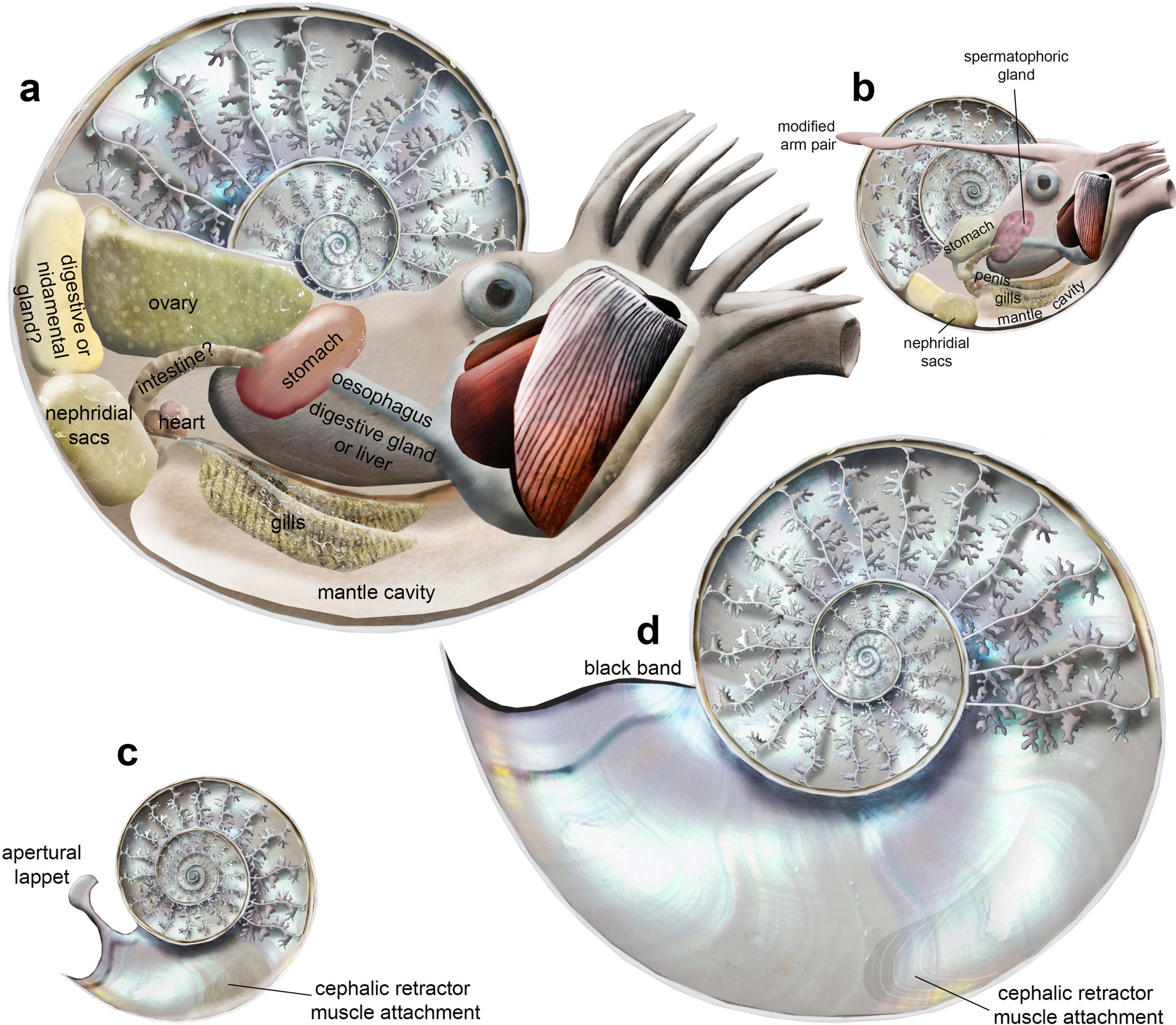
Reconstruction of the internal shell and organs of two individuals of Neochetoceras, featuring a female (larger) and male (smaller)

One feature found in shells of the modern Nautilus is the variation in the shape and size of the shell according to the sex of the animal, the shell of the male being slightly smaller and wider than that of the female. This sexual dimorphism is thought to be an explanation for the variation in size of certain ammonite shells of the same species, the larger shell (the macroconch) being female, and the smaller shell (the microconch) being male. This is thought to be because the female required a larger body size for egg production. A good example of this sexual variation is found in Bifericeras from the early part of the Jurassic period of Europe.

Only recently has sexual variation in the shells of ammonites been recognized. The macroconch and microconch of one species were often previously mistaken for two closely related but different species occurring in the same rocks. However, because the dimorphic sizes are so consistently found together, they are more likely an example of sexual dimorphism within the same species.

Whorl width in the body chamber of many groups of ammonites, as expressed by the width:diameter ratio, is another sign of dimorphism. This character has been used to separate "male" (Largiventer conch "L") from "female" (Leviventer conch "l").

== Paleoecology ==
Many ammonoids probably lived in the open water of ancient seas, rather than at the sea bottom, because their fossils are often found in rocks laid down under conditions where no bottom-dwelling life is found. In general, they appear to have inhabited the upper 250 metres (820 ft) of the water column. Many of them (such as Oxynoticeras) are thought to have been good swimmers, with flattened, discus-shaped, streamlined shells, although some ammonoids were less effective swimmers and were likely to have been slow-swimming bottom-dwellers. Synchrotron analysis of an aptychophoran ammonite revealed remains of isopod and mollusc larvae in its buccal cavity, indicating at least this kind of ammonite fed on plankton. They may have avoided predation by squirting ink, much like modern cephalopods; ink is occasionally preserved in fossil specimens.

Many ammonite shells have been found with round holes once interpreted as a result of limpets attaching themselves to the shells. However, the triangular formation of the holes, their size and shape, and their presence on both sides of the shells, corresponding to the upper and lower jaws, is more likely evidence of the bite of a medium-sized mosasaur preying upon ammonites.

Some ammonites appear to have lived in cold seeps and even reproduced there.

== Cultural significance ==
In medieval Europe, fossilised ammonites were thought to be petrified coiled snakes, and were called "snakestones" or, more commonly in medieval England, "serpentstones". They were considered to be evidence for the actions of saints, such as Hilda of Whitby, a myth referenced in Sir Walter Scott's Marmion, and Saint Patrick, and were held to have healing or oracular powers. Traders would occasionally carve the head of a snake onto the empty, wide end of the ammonite fossil, and then sell them as petrified snakes. In other cases, the snake's head would be simply painted on.

Others believed ammonites, which they referred to as "salagrana", were composed of fossilized worm dung, and could be used to ward off witches.

Ammonites from the Gandaki River in Nepal are known as Shaligrams, and are believed by Hindus to be a concrete manifestation of Vishnu.

The Ammonite order, developed by George Dance the Younger, is an architectural order featuring ammonite-shaped volutes that has seen a handful of uses in British architecture.

== See also ==
- List of ammonite genera
- Belemnoidea
- Coleoidea
- Geologic time scale
