= List of the Mesozoic life of Nevada =

This list of the Mesozoic life of Nevada contains the various prehistoric life-forms whose fossilized remains have been reported from within the US state of Nevada and are between 252.17 and 66 million years of age.

== A ==
- †Acrochordiceras – type locality for genus
  - †Acrochordiceras carolinae
  - †Acrochordiceras hatschekii
  - †Acrochordiceras hyatti – type locality for species
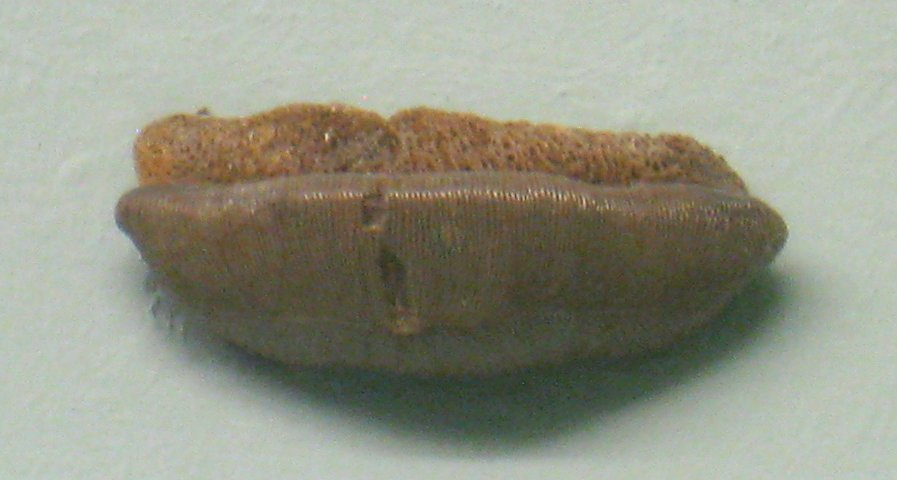
- Fossilized teeth of the Permian-Paleocene cartilaginous fish Acrodus
  †Acrodus
  - †Acrodus alexandrae – type locality for species
  - †Acrodus cuneocostatus – type locality for species
  - †Acrodus oreodontus – type locality for species
  - †Acrodus spitzbergensis
  - †Acrodus vermicularis – or unidentified comparable form
- †Acuminatella
  - †Acuminatella acuminata
  - †Acuminatella angusta
- †Acutomeekoceras – type locality for genus
  - †Acutomeekoceras rieberi – type locality for species
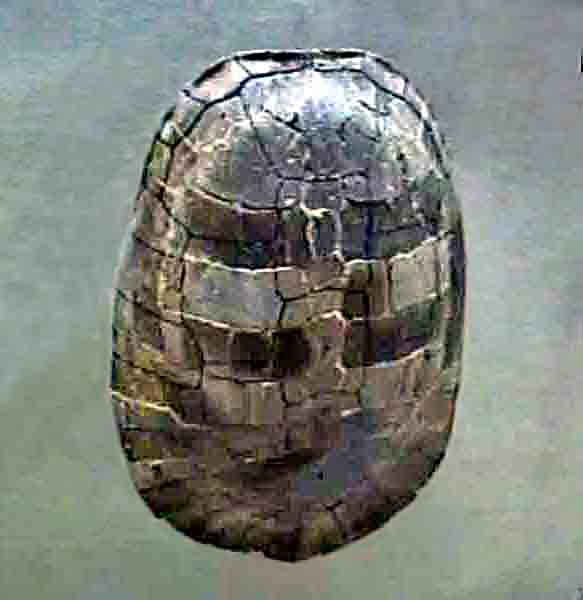
- Fossilized shell of the Early Cretaceous-Oligocene turtle Adocus
  †Adocus – or unidentified comparable form
- †Agerchlamys
  - †Agerchlamys boellingi – type locality for species
- †Alanites
  - †Alanites costatus – type locality for species
  - †Alanites mulleri – type locality for species
  - †Alanites obesus – type locality for species
- †Allocosmia
- †Alsatites
  - †Alsatites pamlicoensis – type locality for species
- †Ambites
  - †Ambites lilangensis
  - †Ambites radiatus – or unidentified related form
- †Ampakabastraea
  - †Ampakabastraea cowichanensis
- †Amphipopanoceras
  - †Amphipopanoceras selwyni
- †Anaflemingites
  - †Anaflemingites russelli
  - †Anaflemingites silberlingi
- †Anagymnites
- †Anagymnotoceras
  - †Anagymnotoceras favretense
  - †Anagymnotoceras variabilis – type locality for species
- †Anasibirites
  - †Anasibirites desertorum
  - †Anasibirites kingianus
- †Anatropites
  - †Anatropites silberlingi
  - †Anatropites sulfurensis – or unidentified comparable form
- †Angulaticeras
  - †Angulaticeras posttaurinus - or unidentified loosely related form
- †Anolcites
  - †Anolcites barberi – type locality for species
  - †Anolcites drakei – type locality for species
- †Antiquilima
  - †Antiquilima ladinica – type locality for species
- †Aplococeras
  - †Aplococeras parvus – type locality for species
  - †Aplococeras smithi
  - †Aplococeras vogdesi – type locality for species
- †Arcavicula
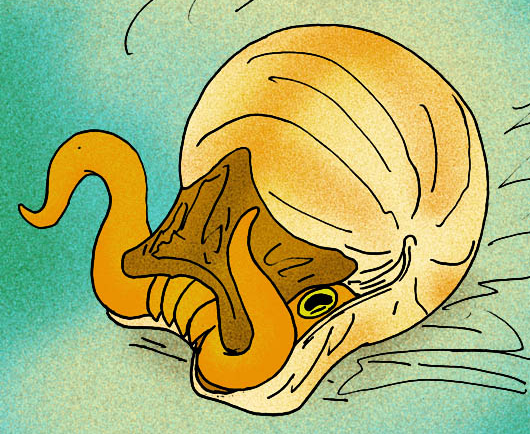
- Life restoration of two species of the Late Triassic ammonoid cephalopod Arcestes
  †Arcestes
  - †Arcestes andersoni – type locality for species
  - †Arcestes gigantogaleatus
  - †Arcestes oligosarcus
- †Arctoceras
  - †Arctoceras tuberculatum
  - †Arctoceras tuberculum
- †Arctohungarites
  - †Arctohungarites tregoi – type locality for species
- †Arctoprionites
- †Ardoreosomus – type locality for genus
  - †Ardoreosomus occidentalis – type locality for species
- †Areaseris – type locality for genus
  - †Areaseris nevadaensis – type locality for species
- †Arenicolites
- †Aspenites
  - †Aspenites acutus
- Astarte
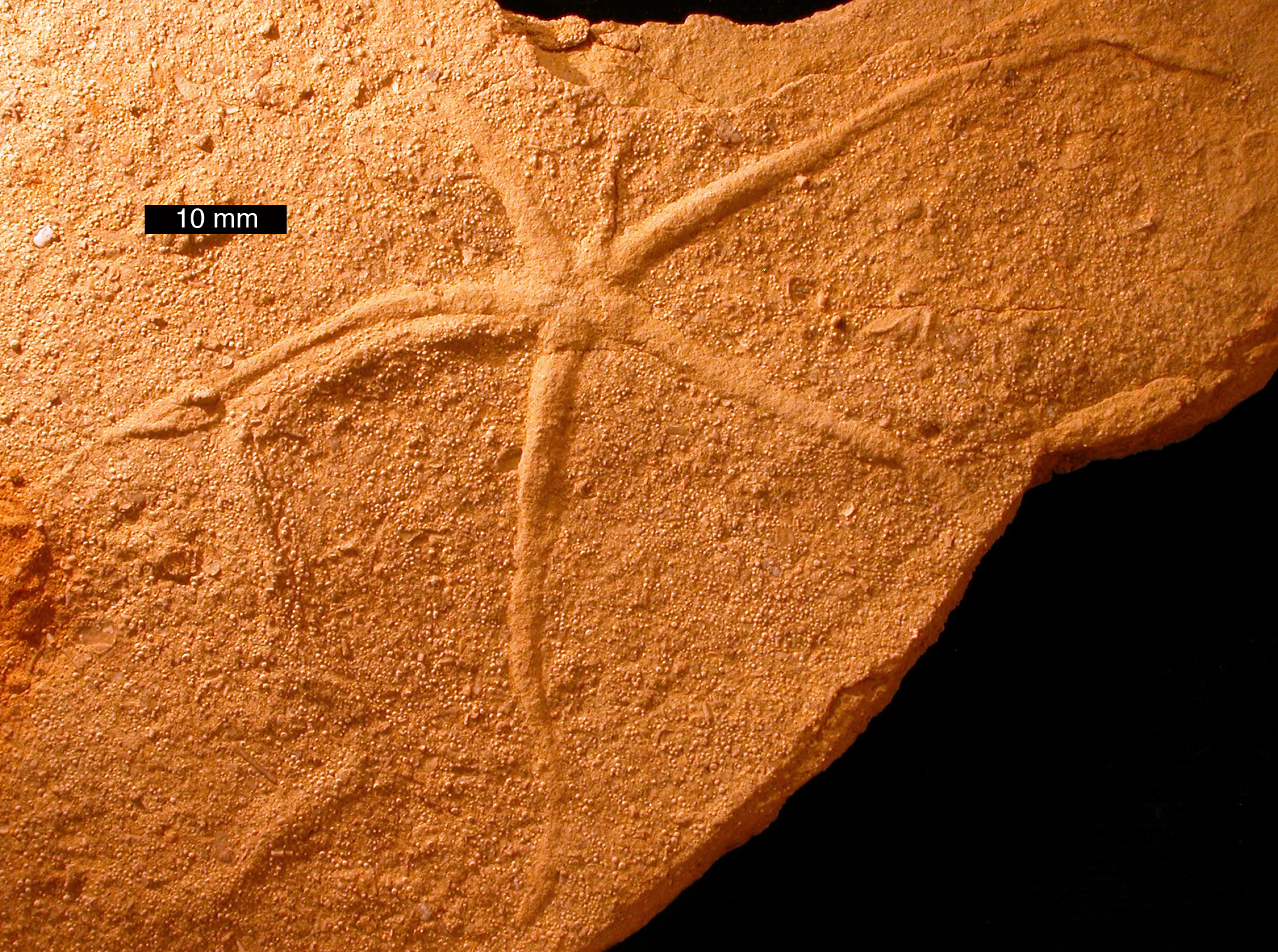
- Fossil of the Ordovician-Modern sea star trace fossil ichnogenus Asteriacites
  Asteriacites
  - †Asteriacites lumbricalis
- †Astraeomorpha
  - †Astraeomorpha confusa
- †Atractites
  - †Atractites clavatulus – type locality for species
  - †Atractites elegans – type locality for species
  - †Atractites solidus – type locality for species
- Atrina
  - †Atrina sinuta – type locality for species
- †Augustaceras – type locality for genus
  - †Augustaceras escheri – type locality for species
  - †Augustaceras robustum – type locality for species
  - †Augustaceras staffordi – type locality for species
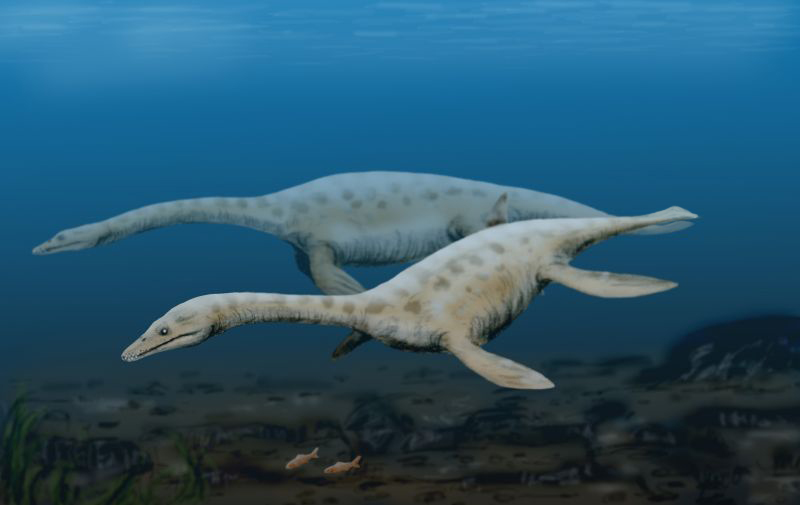
- Life restoration of the Middle Triassic plesiosaur relative Augustasaurus
  †Augustasaurus – type locality for genus
  - †Augustasaurus hagdorni – type locality for species
- †Aulametacoceras – tentative report
  - †Aulametacoceras humboldtensis – type locality for species
- Avicula
  - †Avicula homfrayi – type locality for species
- †Avicularia
  - †Avicularia sayeri – or unidentified comparable form

== B ==
- †Badouxia
  - †Badouxia canadensis
  - †Badouxia columbiae
  - †Badouxia forticostata
- †Balatonites
  - †Balatonites hexatuberculatus – type locality for species
  - †Balatonites kingi – type locality for species
  - †Balatonites shoshonensis – type locality for species
  - †Balatonites whitneyi
- †Balatonospira – tentative report
  - †Balatonospira lipoldi – or unidentified comparable form
- †Billingsites
  - †Billingsites cordeyi
  - †Billingsites escargueli – type locality for species
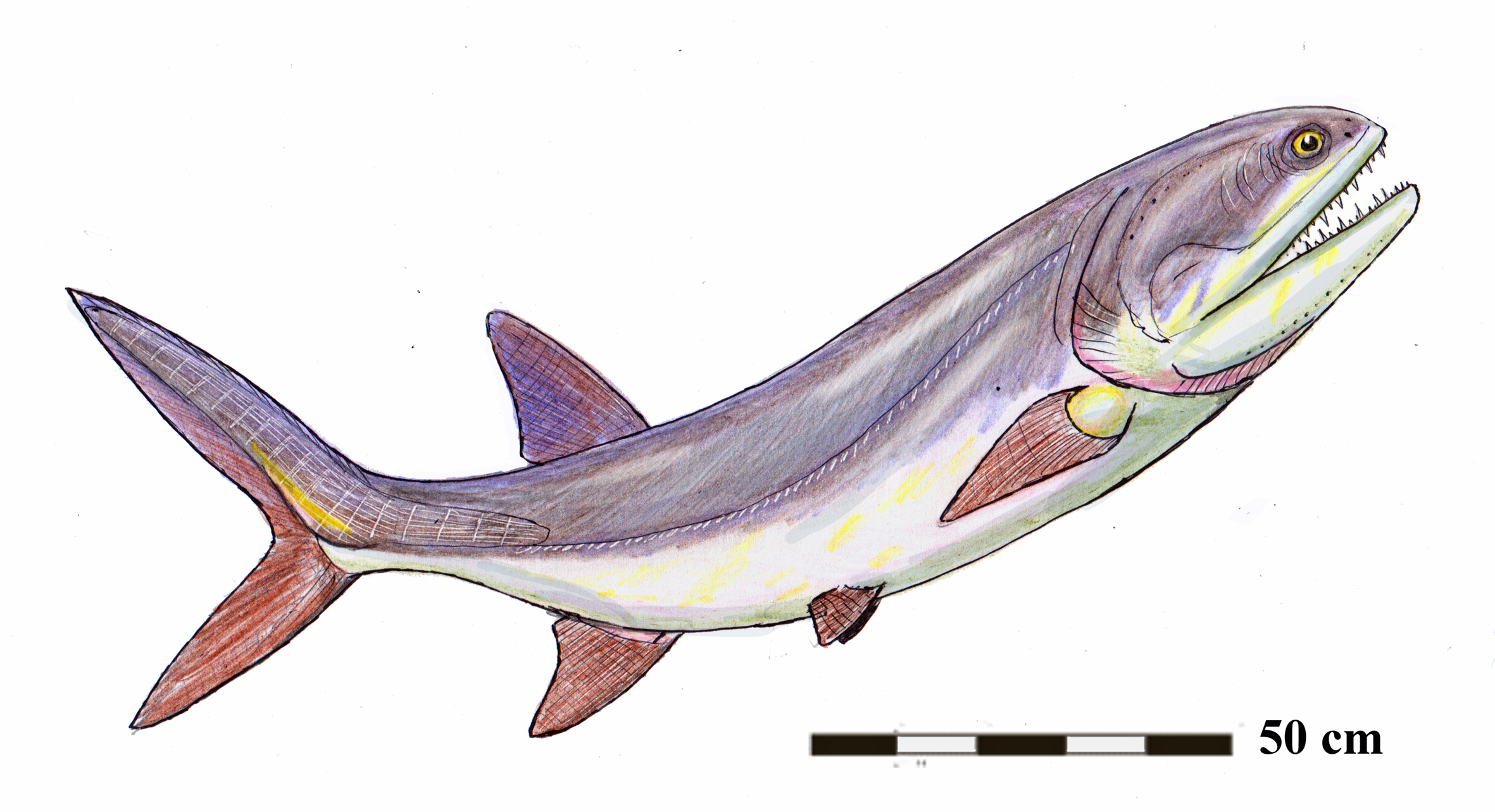
- Life restoration of the Triassic bony fish Birgeria
  †Birgeria
- †Bivalvia conc
- †Bositra
  - †Bositra favretensis – type locality for species
- †Brackites
  - †Brackites spinosus – type locality for species
  - †Brackites vogdesi – type locality for species
- †Bradyia
  - †Bradyia coyotense – type locality for species
- †Brasilichnium
- †Bulogites
  - †Bulogites mojsvari

== C ==
- †Calliconites
  - †Calliconites nevadensis – type locality for species
- †Candelarialepis – type locality for genus
  - †Candelarialepis argentus – type locality for species
- Cardinia
- †Carnites – tentative report
- †Cassianastraea
  - †Cassianastraea reussi
- †Cassianella
  - †Cassianella ligulata
  - †Cassianella lingulata
- †Caucasites
  - †Caucasites nicholsi – type locality for species
- †Caucasorhynchia
  - †Caucasorhynchia altaplecta
- †Ceccaceras
  - †Ceccaceras stecki
- †Ceccaisculitoides
  - †Ceccaisculitoides elegans – type locality for species
- †Ceratites
  - †Ceratites weaveri – type locality for species
  - †Ceratites whitneyi – type locality for species
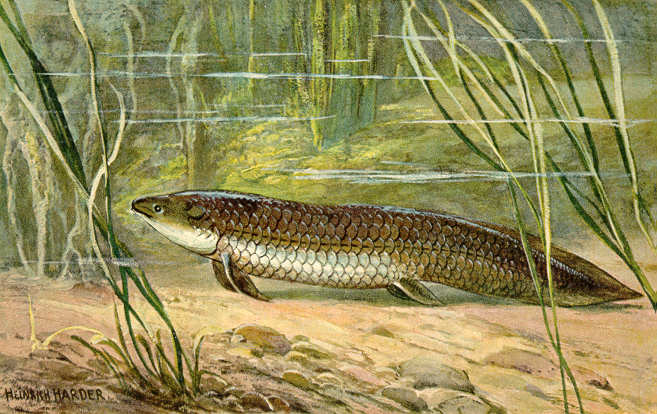
- Life restoration of the Late Triassic-Eocene lungfish Ceratodus
  †Ceratodus
- †Ceriostella – type locality for genus
  - †Ceriostella martini
  - †Ceriostella parva
  - †Ceriostella variabilis – type locality for species
- †Chiratites
  - †Chiratites bituberculatus – type locality for species
  - †Chiratites retrospinosus – type locality for species
- Chlamys
- †Chondrocoenia
  - †Chondrocoenia schafhaeutli
- †Chonespondylus
  - †Chonespondylus grandis
- †Choristoceras
  - †Choristoceras crickmayi
  - †Choristoceras marshi
  - †Choristoceras minutum
  - †Choristoceras rhaeticum
  - †Choristoceras robustum – type locality for species
  - †Choristoceras shoshonensis – type locality for species
- †Churkites
  - †Churkites noblei – type locality for species
- †Cinnabaria
  - †Cinnabaria expansa
- †Claraia
  - †Claraia aurita
  - †Claraia clarai
  - †Claraia stachei
- †Clypites
  - †Clypites evolvens – or unidentified comparable form
- †Cochlichnus
- †Cochloceras
  - †Cochloceras fisheri
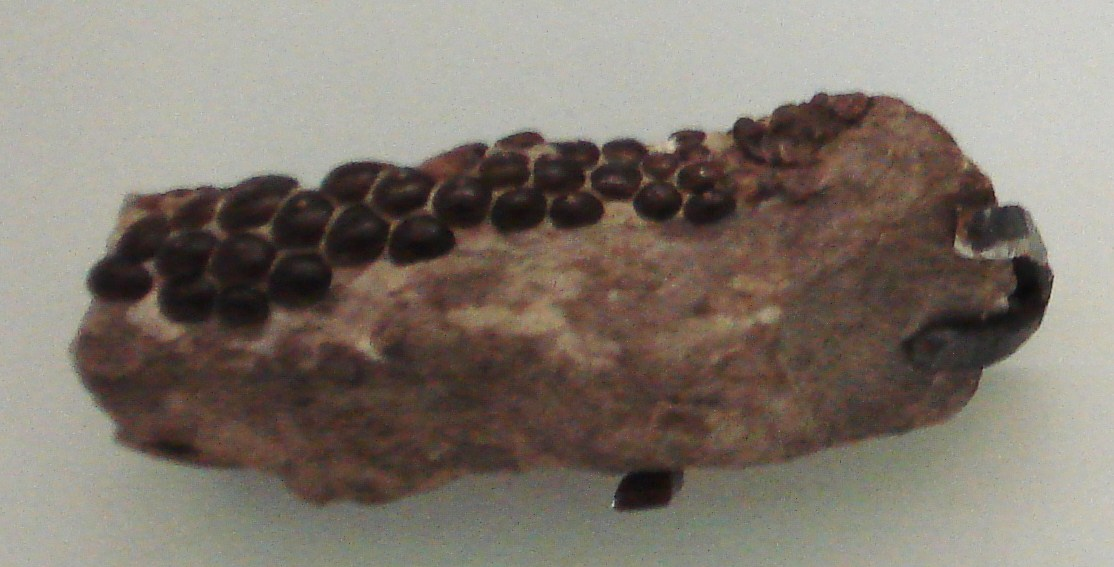
- Fossil of the Triassic bony fish Colobodus
  †Colobodus
- †Complanicorona
  - †Complanicorona rugosimargines – or unidentified related form
- †Confusionella – report made of unidentified related form or using admittedly obsolete nomenclature
  - †Confusionella loczyi
- †Conservatella
  - †Conservatella conservativa – type locality for species
- †Constrigymnites
  - †Constrigymnites robertsi – type locality for species
- †Coral
- Corbula – report made of unidentified related form or using admittedly obsolete nomenclature
  - †Corbula blakei – type locality for species
- †Cordillerites
  - †Cordillerites angulatus – or unidentified comparable form
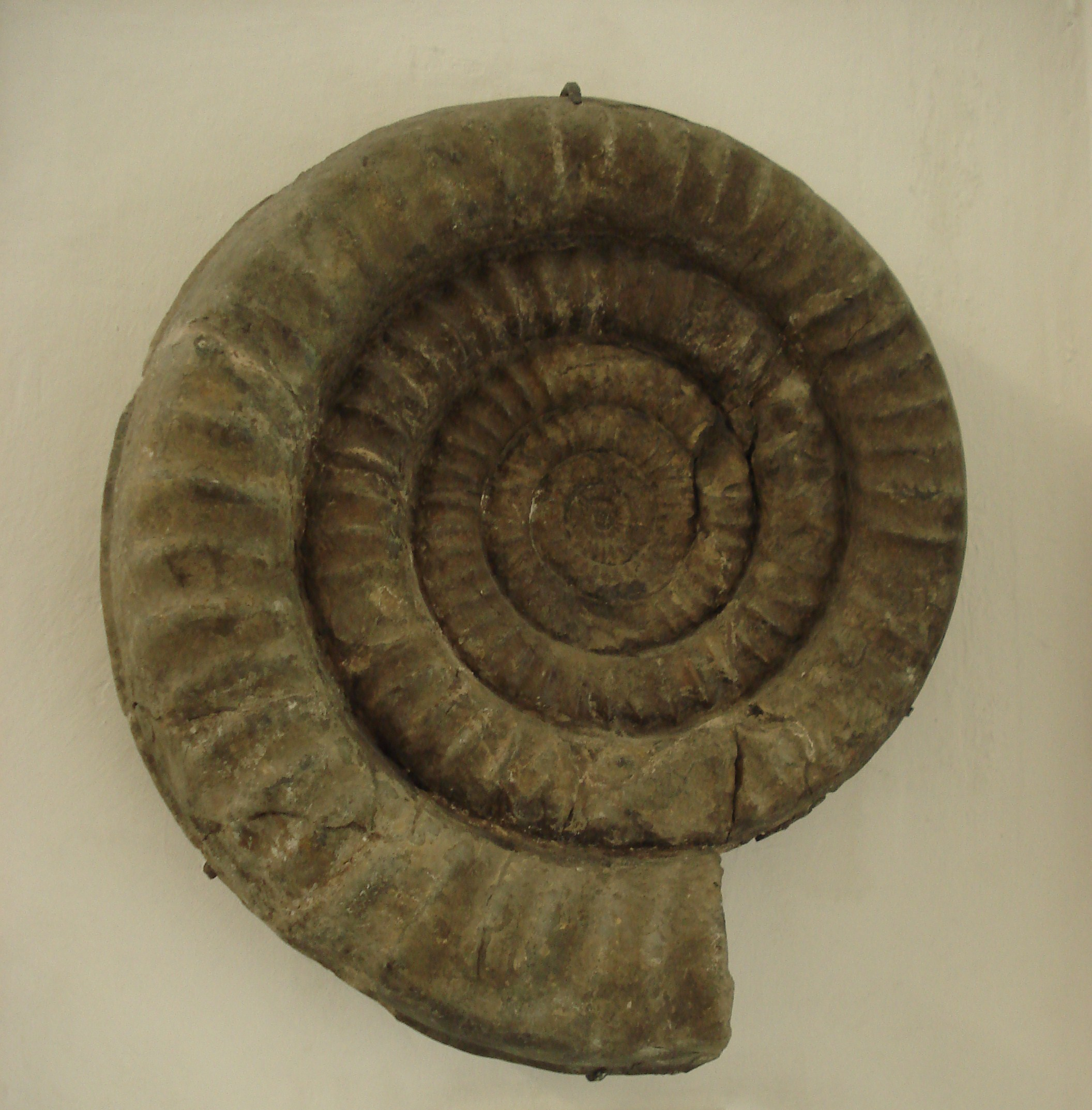
- Fossilized shell of the Early Jurassic ammonoid cephalopod Coroniceras
  †Coroniceras
  - †Coroniceras fergusoni – type locality for species
  - †Coroniceras grantsvillense – type locality for species
  - †Coroniceras involutum – type locality for species
  - †Coroniceras luningense – type locality for species
  - †Coroniceras volcanoense – type locality for species
- †Costatoria
- †Crassistella
  - †Crassistella juvavica
- †Crittendenia
  - †Crittendenia kummeli – type locality for species
- †Crucella
- †Ctenostreon
- †Cuifastraea – tentative report
- †Cuifia
  - †Cuifia marmorea
- †Curionia
- †Curtoseris
  - †Curtoseris dunlapcanyonae – type locality for species
  - †Curtoseris parva
- †Cycloceltites
  - †Cycloceltites arduini
  - †Cycloceltites tozeri – type locality for species
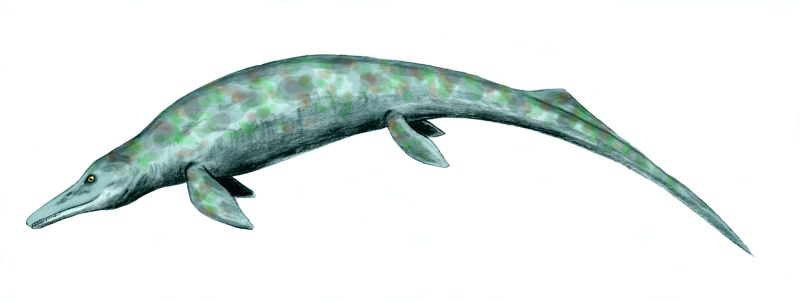
- Life restoration of the Middle-Late Triassic ichthyosaur Cymbospondylus
  †Cymbospondylus
  - †Cymbospondylus natans
  - †Cymbospondylus nevadanus – type locality for species
  - †Cymbospondylus petrinus
  - †Cymbospondylus piscosus
- †Cypellospongia – type locality for genus
  - †Cypellospongia fimbriartis

== D ==
- †Dalmatites
  - †Dalmatites attenuatus
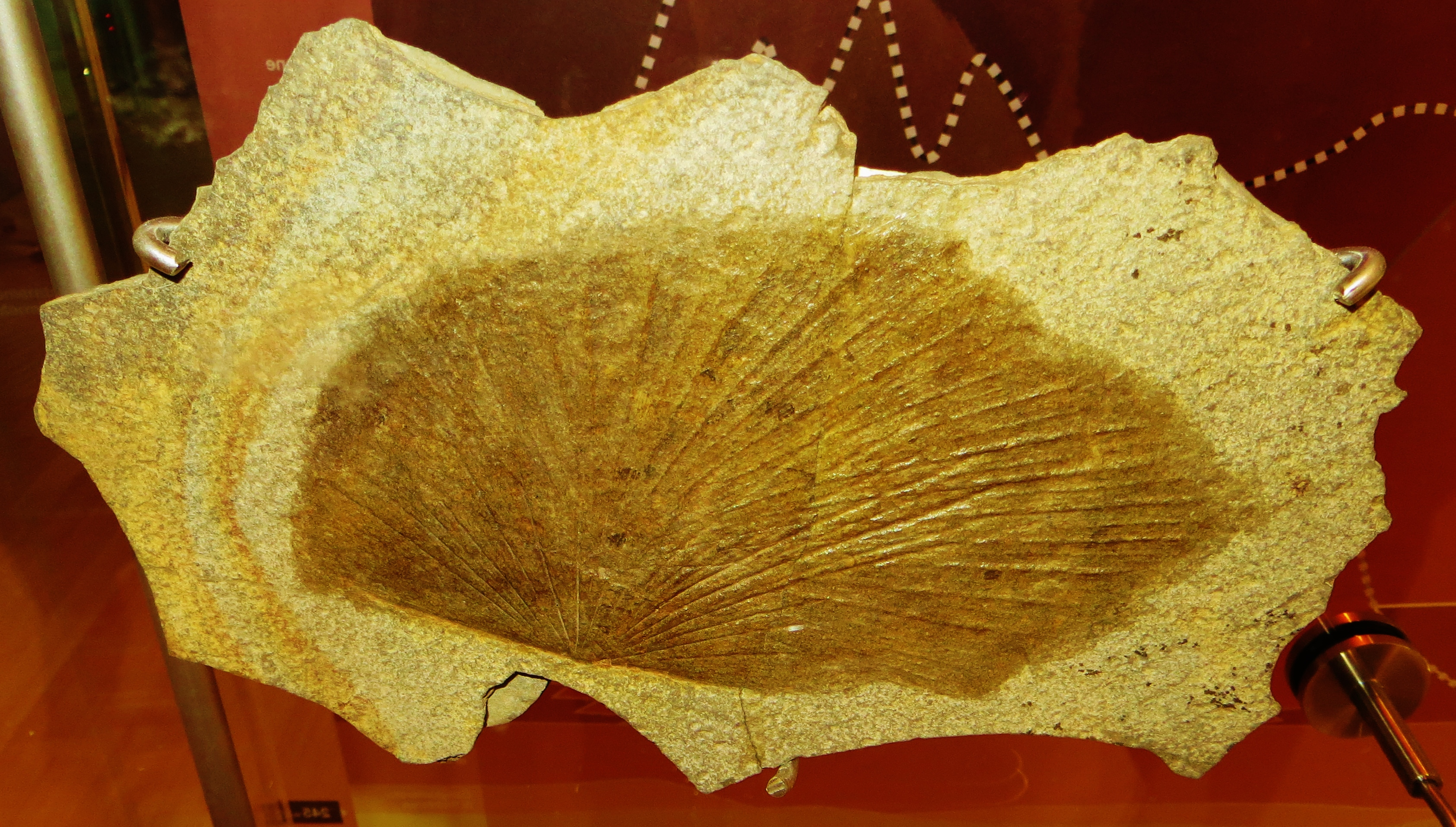
- Fossilized shell of the Middle-Late Triassic marine bivalve Daonella
  †Daonella
  - †Daonella americana – type locality for species
  - †Daonella dubia
  - †Daonella elongata – or unidentified comparable form
  - †Daonella gabbi
  - †Daonella indica – or unidentified related form
  - †Daonella lindstroemi
  - †Daonella lommeli – or unidentified comparable form
  - †Daonella lommelli – or unidentified comparable form
  - †Daonella moussoni
  - †Daonella rieberi – type locality for species
  - †Daonella sturi – or unidentified comparable form
- †Daxatina
- †Decapod
- †Decopod
- †Deweveria
  - †Deweveria crenulata – type locality for species
- †Dieneroceras
  - †Dieneroceras dieneri
  - †Dieneroceras spathi
  - †Dieneroceras subquadratum
- †Discophyllites
  - †Discophyllites ebneri
- †Discoptychites
  - †Discoptychites megalodiscus
- †Discosiphonella
- †Discretella
  - †Discretella discreta – type locality for species
- †Distichomeandra
  - †Distichomeandra minor – or unidentified comparable form
- †Distichophyllia – report made of unidentified related form or using admittedly obsolete nomenclature
  - †Distichophyllia norica
- †Dixieceras
  - †Dixieceras lawsoni – type locality for species
- †Dyscritellopsis
  - †Dyscritellopsis montelloensis – type locality for species
  - †Dyscritellopsis thaynesianus – type locality for species

== E ==
- †Elegantinia
  - †Elegantinia paullorum – type locality for species
- †Ellisonia – type locality for genus
  - †Ellisonia nevadensis – type locality for species
  - †Ellisonia triassica – type locality for species
- †Elysastraea
  - †Elysastraea austriaca – or unidentified comparable form
  - †Elysastraea norica – or unidentified comparable form
  - †Elysastraea profunda
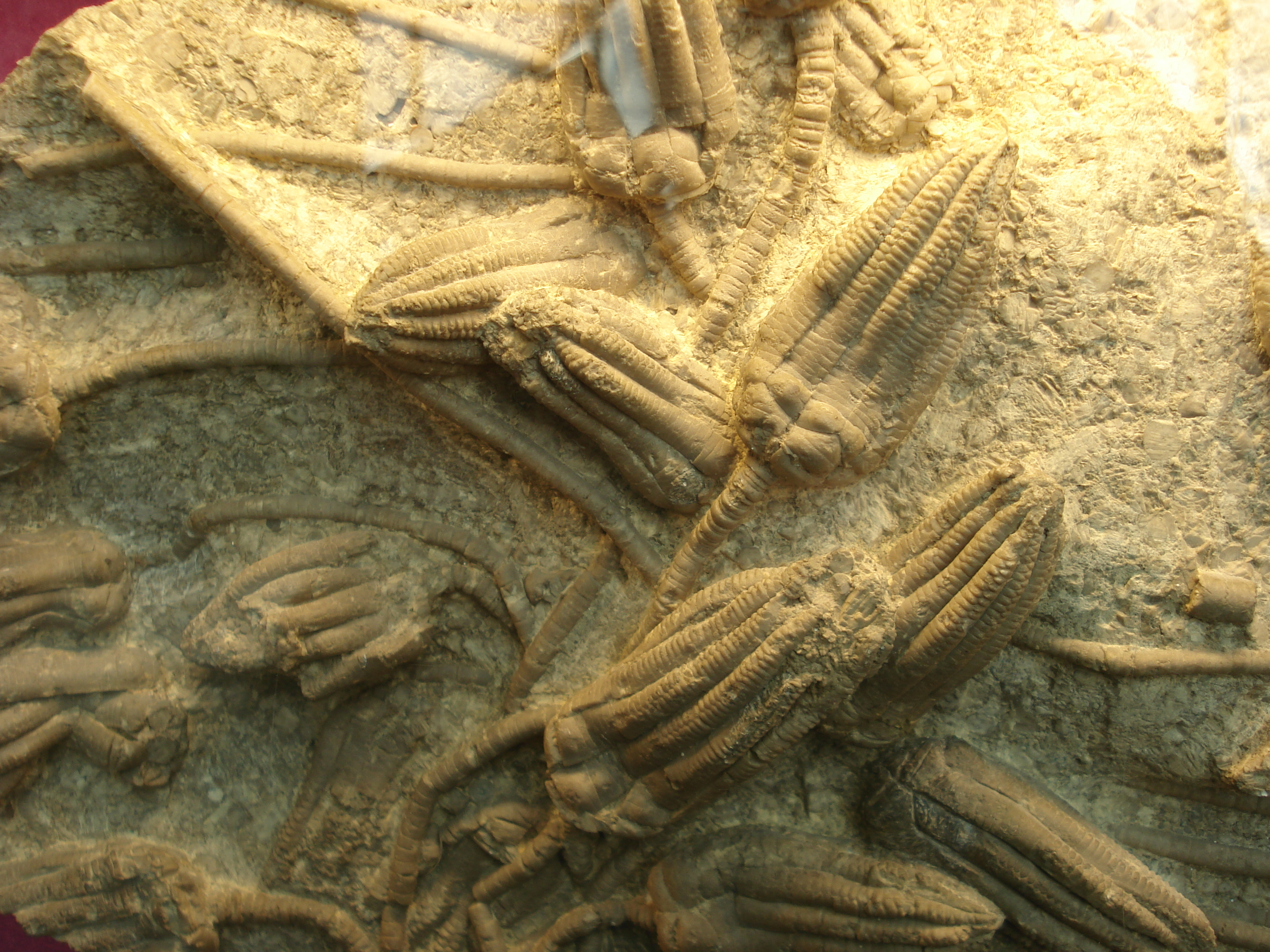
- Fossils of the Middle Triassic crinoid ("sea lily") Encrinus
  †Encrinus
- †Endothyra – or unidentified comparable form
- †Enteropleura
  - †Enteropleura jenksi – type locality for species
- †Entolioides
  - †Entolioides utahensis – type locality for species
- †Entolium
- †Eocomoseris
  - †Eocomoseris ramosa
- †Eogymnotoceras
  - †Eogymnotoceras janvieri – type locality for species
  - †Eogymnotoceras thompsoni – type locality for species
  - †Eogymnotoceras transiens – type locality for species
  - †Eogymnotoceras tuberculatum – type locality for species
- †Eolytoceras
  - †Eolytoceras artemisia – type locality for species
  - †Eolytoceras guexi – type locality for species
  - †Eolytoceras tasekoi
- †Eoprotrachyceras
  - †Eoprotrachyceras americanum
  - †Eoprotrachyceras dunni – type locality for species
  - †Eoprotrachyceras lahontanum – type locality for species
  - †Eoprotrachyceras meeki
  - †Eoprotrachyceras subasperum – type locality for species
- †Epigondolella
  - †Epigondolella bidentata
  - †Epigondolella englandi
  - †Epigondolella mosheri
- †Epigymnites
  - †Epigymnites alexandrae – type locality for species
- †Eremites
- †Eschericeratites
  - †Eschericeratites lytoceratoides
- †Eudiscoceras – type locality for genus
  - †Eudiscoceras gabbi – type locality for species
- †Euflemingites
  - †Euflemingites cirratus
- †Eumorphotis
  - †Eumorphotis multiformis
- †Eutomoceras – type locality for genus
  - †Eutomoceras dalli – type locality for species
  - †Eutomoceras dunni – type locality for species
  - †Eutomoceras lahontanum – type locality for species
  - †Eutomoceras laubei – type locality for species

== F ==
- †Fanthalamia
  - †Fanthalamia astoma
- †Favreticeras
  - †Favreticeras ransomei – type locality for species
  - †Favreticeras rieberi – type locality for species
  - †Favreticeras wallacei – type locality for species
- †Flexastrea – type locality for genus
  - †Flexastrea serialis – type locality for species
- †Frankites
  - †Frankites sutherlandi
- †Frechites
  - †Frechites nevadanus – type locality for species
  - †Frechites occidentalis – type locality for species
- †Frenguelliella
- †Furnishius – type locality for genus
  - †Furnishius triserratus – type locality for species

== G ==
- †Gabboceras – type locality for genus
  - †Gabboceras delicatum – type locality for species
- †Galfettites
  - †Galfettites lucasi – type locality for species
- †Gaudemerites – type locality for genus
  - †Gaudemerites rectangularis – type locality for species
- †Germanonautilus
  - †Germanonautilus furlongi – type locality for species
  - †Germanonautilus johnstoni – type locality for species
  - †Germanonautilus kummeli
- †Gervillaria
  - †Gervillaria favretensis – type locality for species
  - †Gervillaria ponderosa – type locality for species
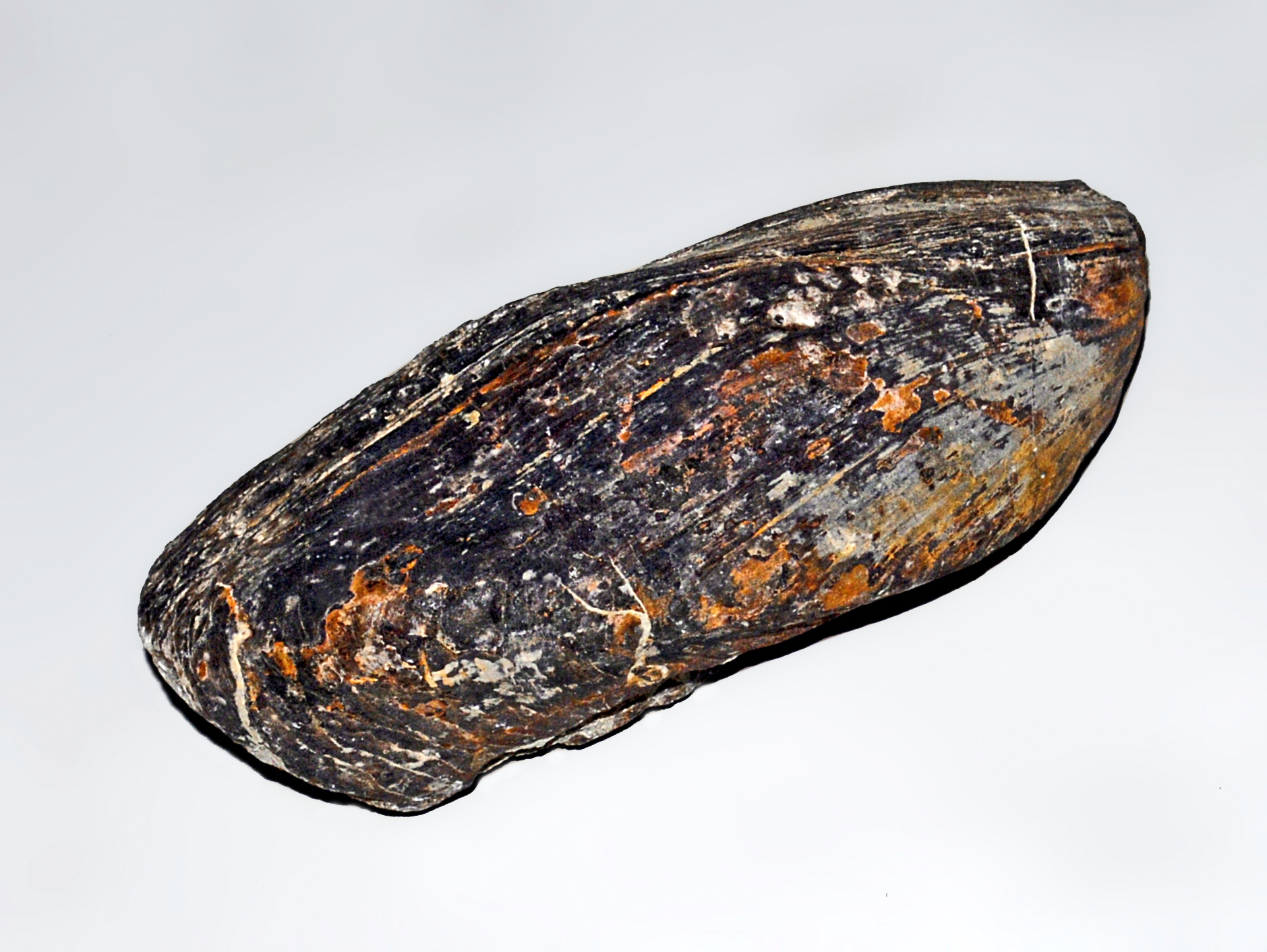
- Fossilized shell of the Carboniferous-Eocene bivalve Gervillia
  †Gervillia
- †Ginsburgites
  - †Ginsburgites americanus – type locality for species
- †Globacrochordiceras
  - †Globacrochordiceras transpacificum
- †Glyptophiceras – tentative report
- †Gnomohalorites
  - †Gnomohalorites americanus
- †Gondolella
  - †Gondolella carinita – type locality for species
  - †Gondolella denuda – or unidentified related form
  - †Gondolella eotriassica – type locality for species
  - †Gondolella milleri – type locality for species
  - †Gondolella nevadensis – type locality for species
  - †Gondolella planata – type locality for species
- †Goniatites – report made of unidentified related form or using admittedly obsolete nomenclature
  - †Goniatites laevidorsatus
- †Goniomya
- †Gonionotites
- †Grambergia
- †Gresslya
- †Groenlandites
  - †Groenlandites merriami – type locality for species
  - †Groenlandites pridaense – type locality for species
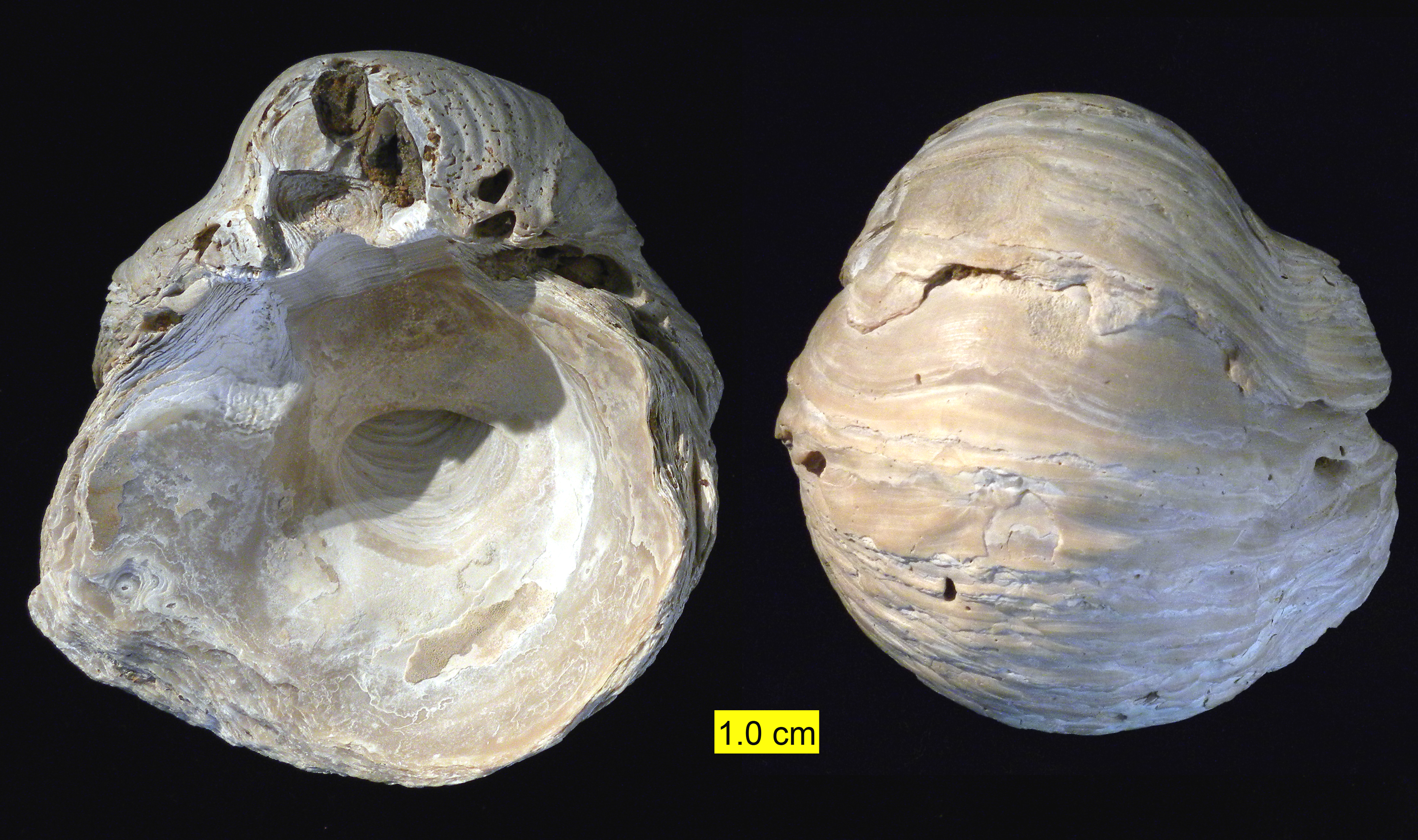
- Interior and exterior of a fossilized shell of the Late Triassic-Eocene marine bivalve Gryphaea
  †Gryphaea
  - †Gryphaea nevadensis – type locality for species
- †Grypoceras
  - †Grypoceras brahmanicum – or unidentified comparable form
  - †Grypoceras whitneyi – type locality for species
- †Guangxidella
  - †Guangxidella bransoni – type locality for species
- †Guembelastraea
  - †Guembelastraea martini
- †Guembelites
  - †Guembelites jandianus
  - †Guembelites philostrati
- †Guexiceras – type locality for genus
  - †Guexiceras profundus – type locality for species
- †Guexites
  - †Guexites pacificus – type locality for species
- †Guineana
  - †Guineana alta – type locality for species
- †Guodunites
  - †Guodunites monneti – or unidentified comparable form
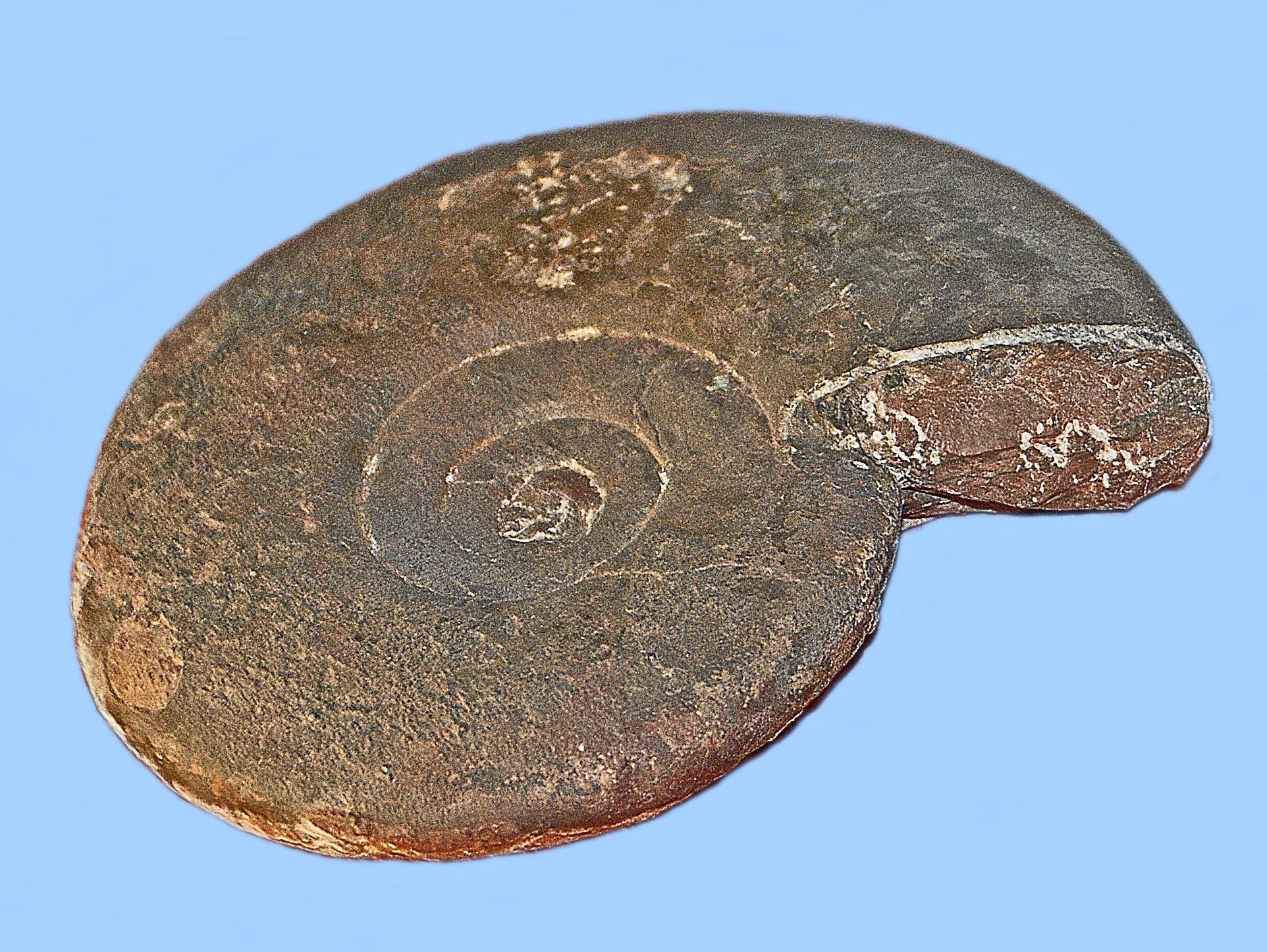
- Fossilized shell of the Triassic ammonoid cephalopod Gymnites
  †Gymnites
  - †Gymnites billingsi – type locality for species
  - †Gymnites calli – type locality for species
  - †Gymnites humboldti – or unidentified comparable form
  - †Gymnites perplanus – type locality for species
  - †Gymnites tozeri – type locality for species
  - †Gymnites tregorum – type locality for species
- †Gymnotoceras – type locality for genus
  - †Gymnotoceras blakei – type locality for species
  - †Gymnotoceras ginsbergi – or unidentified related form
  - †Gymnotoceras ginsburgi – type locality for species
  - †Gymnotoceras mimetus – type locality for species
  - †Gymnotoceras praecursor – type locality for species
  - †Gymnotoceras rotelliformis – type locality for species
  - †Gymnotoceras weitschati – type locality for species
- †Gyrochorte
- †Gyrolepis – tentative report

== H ==
- †Halobia
  - †Halobia beyrichi
  - †Halobia selwyni – or unidentified comparable form
  - †Halobia septentrionalis
- †Hannaoceras
- †Hemilecanites
  - †Hemilecanites fastigatus – type locality for species
  - †Hemilecanites paradiscus – or unidentified comparable form
- †Hemiprionites
  - †Hemiprionites roberti – type locality for species
- †Heptastylis
  - †Heptastylis stromatoporoides – or unidentified comparable form
- †Hibbardella
  - †Hibbardella subsymmetrica – type locality for species
- †Hollandites
  - †Hollandites congressensis – type locality for species
  - †Hollandites pelletieri – or unidentified comparable form
  - †Hollandites silberlingi – type locality for species
  - †Hollandites spivaki
  - †Hollandites voiti – or unidentified related form
- †Holocrinus
- †Humboldtites
  - †Humboldtites septentrionalis – type locality for species
- †Hungarites
  - †Hungarites inermis
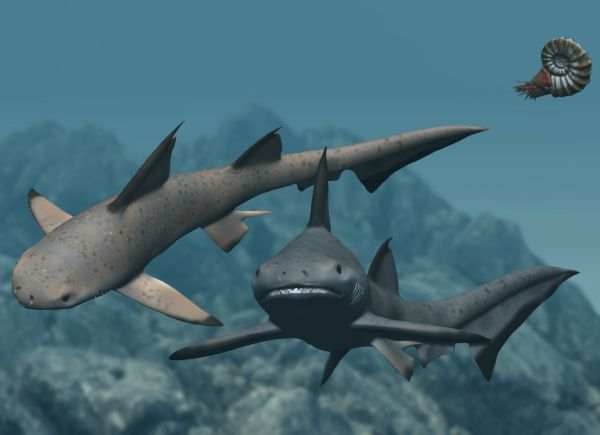
- Restoration of two of the Permian-Late Cretaceous cartilaginous fish Hybodus
  †Hybodus
  - †Hybodus nevadensis – type locality for species
- †Hyerifalchia

== I ==
- †Ichthyosaurus
- †Intornites
  - †Intornites mctaggarti
  - †Intornites nevadanus – type locality for species
- †Inyoites
  - †Inyoites oweni
- †Iranothalamia – tentative report
  - †Iranothalamia incrustans – type locality for species
- †Isculites
  - †Isculites constrictus – type locality for species
  - †Isculites meeki – type locality for species
  - †Isculites tozeri – type locality for species
- †Ismidites
  - †Ismidites marmarensis – or unidentified comparable form
- Isocrinus

== J ==
- †Japonites
  - †Japonites starensis – type locality for species
  - †Japonites surgriva – or unidentified comparable form
  - †Japonites welteri – type locality for species
- †Jaworskiella
  - †Jaworskiella siemonmulleri – type locality for species
- †Jenksites
  - †Jenksites flexicostatus – type locality for species
- †Juraphyllites - broadly construed
- †Juvavites
- †Juvenites
  - †Juvenites dieneri
  - †Juvenites septentrigonalis
  - †Juvenites septentrionalis
  - †Juvenites thermarum

== K ==
- †Kalentera – tentative report
  - †Kalentera lawsi – type locality for species
- †Kashmirites
  - †Kashmirites nivalis
- †Khytrastrea – type locality for genus
  - †Khytrastrea cuifiamorpha – type locality for species
  - †Khytrastrea silberlingi – type locality for species
- †Klamatgites
- †Klamathites
  - †Klamathites macrolobatus
  - †Klamathites schucherti
- †Klamthites
- †Koipatoceras – type locality for genus
  - †Koipatoceras discoideus – type locality for species
  - †Koipatoceras kraffti – type locality for species
- †Kraussodontus
- †Kuhnastraea
  - †Kuhnastraea decussata – or unidentified comparable form

== L ==
- †Labascicorona
- †Lanceolites
  - †Lanceolites bicarinatus
  - †Lanceolites compactus
- †Lecanites
  - †Lecanites arnoldi
- †Leiophyllites
- †Lenotropites
  - †Lenotropites caurus
- †Lepismatina
  - †Lepismatina mansfieldi
- †Leptochondria
  - †Leptochondria curtocardinalis
  - †Leptochondria occidanea
  - †Leptochondria shoshonensis – type locality for species
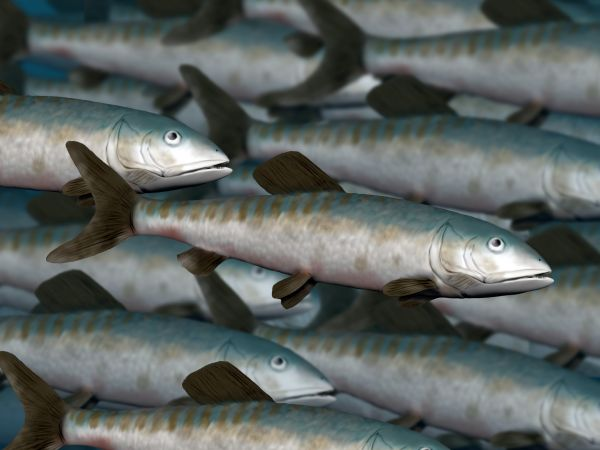
- Restoration of a school of the Middle Triassic-Early Cretaceous bony fish Leptolepis
  †Leptolepis
  - †Leptolepis nevadensis
- Limaria
- †Liostrea – tentative report
  - †Liostrea jungi – type locality for species
- †Lithiotis
  - †Lithiotis problematica
- †Lockeia
- †Lonchodina
  - †Lonchodina aequiarcuata – type locality for species
  - †Lonchodina nevadensis – type locality for species
  - †Lonchodina triassica – type locality for species
- †Lonchodus
- †Longobardites
  - †Longobardites parvus – type locality for species
  - †Longobardites zsigmondyi
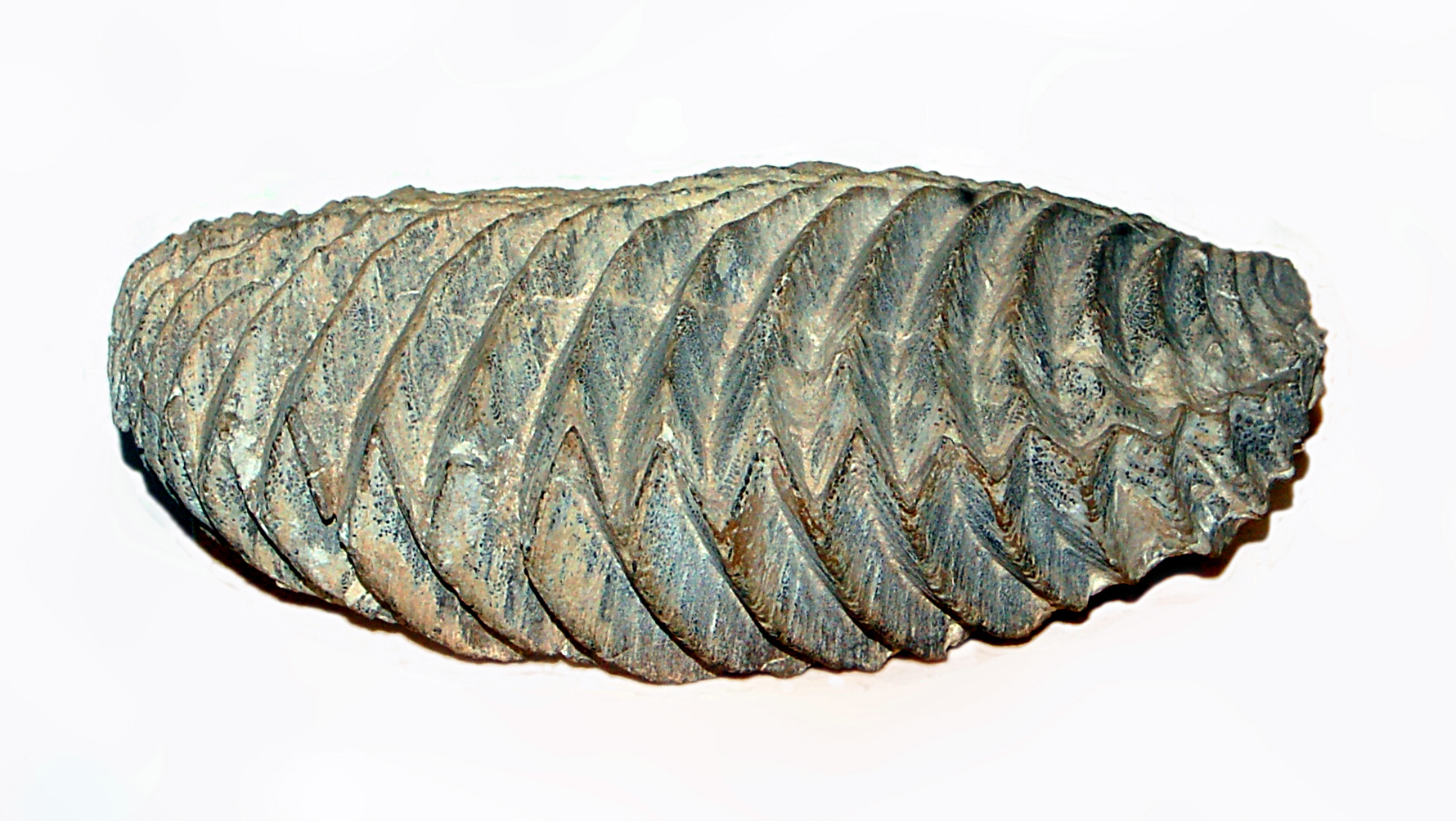
- Fossilized shell of the Triassic-modern marine bivalve Lopha
  Lopha
  - †Lopha montis
- †Loxochlamys – type locality for genus
  - †Loxochlamys corallina – type locality for species

== M ==
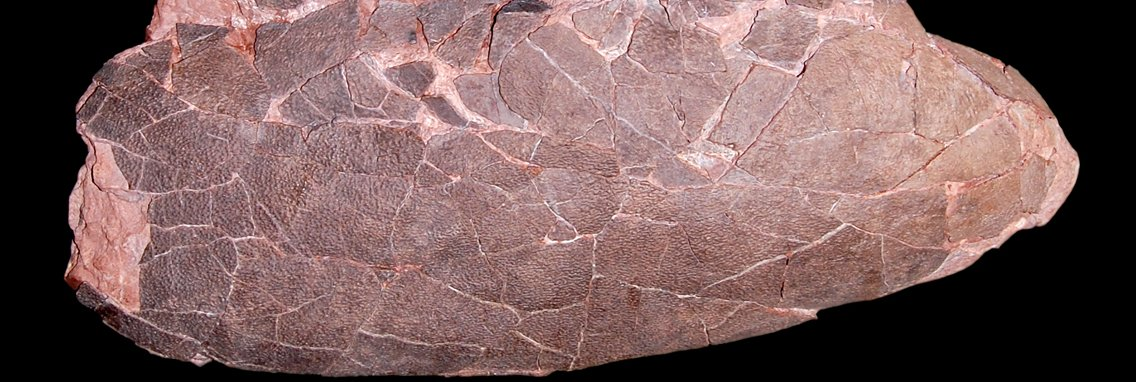
- Fossils of the Cretaceous theropod dinosaur egg oogenus Macroelongatoolithus
  †Macroelongatoolithus
  - †Macroelongatoolithus carlylei – or unidentified comparable form
- †Maeandrostylis
  - †Maeandrostylis vancouverensis
- †Marcouxites
  - †Marcouxites spinifer – type locality for species
- †Margarogyra
  - †Margarogyra silberlingi – type locality for species
- Marginulina
- †Meandrostylus
  - †Meandrostylus vancouverensis
- †Meandrovolzeia
- †Meekoceras
  - †Meekoceras gracilitatis
  - †Meekoceras mushbachanum – or unidentified comparable form
  - †Meekoceras tenuistriatum – or unidentified comparable form
- †Megaphyllites
  - †Megaphyllites wildhorsensis – type locality for species
- †Meleagrinella
- †Mesomiltha
- †Mesomorpha
  - †Mesomorpha newpassensis – type locality for species
- †Metadagnoceras
  - †Metadagnoceras youngi – type locality for species
- †Metadinarites
  - †Metadinarites desertorus – type locality for species
- †Metapolygnathus
  - †Metapolygnathus communisti - or unidentified loosely related form
- †Metophioceras
  - †Metophioceras rotarium – or unidentified related form
  - †Metophioceras trigonatum – type locality for species
- †Metussuria
- †Michelinoceras
  - †Michelinoceras campanile
- †Microconchus
- †Minasteria
  - †Minasteria shastensis
- †Miocidaris
- †Misikella
  - †Misikella posthernsteini
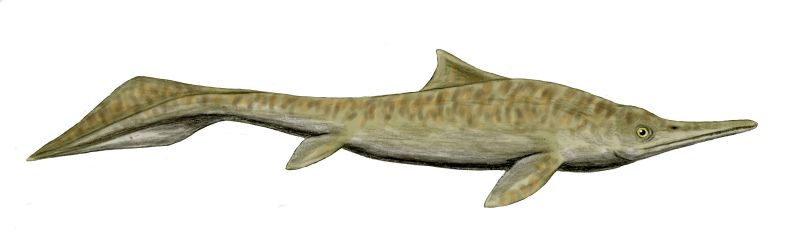
- Life restoration of the Middle Triassic ichthyosaur Mixosaurus
  †Mixosaurus
  - †Mixosaurus natans – or unidentified comparable form
- †Modiolus
- †Modiomorpha – tentative report
  - †Modiomorpha lata – type locality for species
  - †Modiomorpha ovata – type locality for species
- †Mojsisovicsites
- †Mojsvarites
  - †Mojsvarites agenor – type locality for species
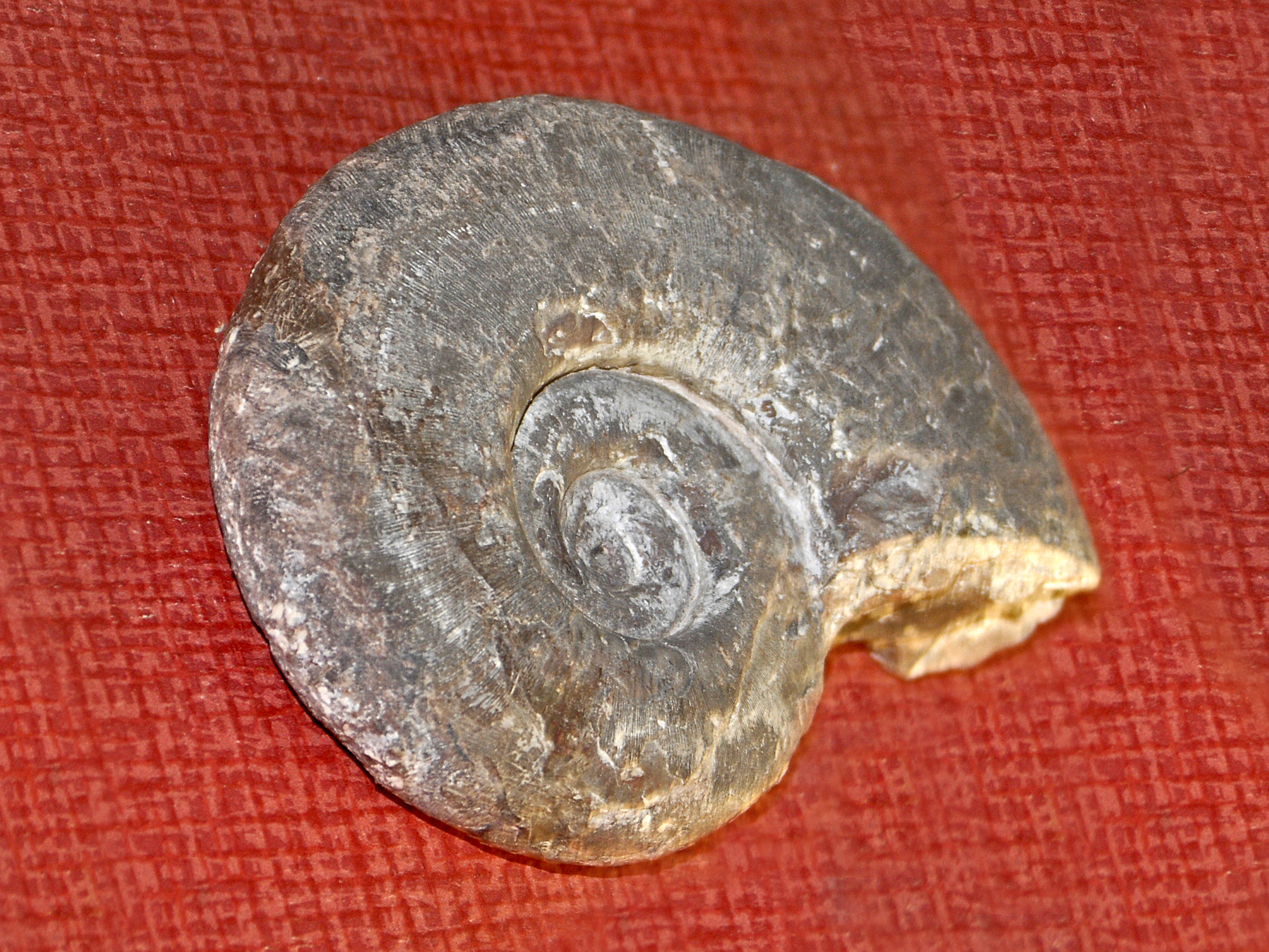
- Fossilized shell of the Middle Triassic ammonoid cephalopod Monophyllites
  †Monophyllites
  - †Monophyllites wengensis
- †Monotis
  - †Monotis alaskana
  - †Monotis haueri
  - †Monotis subcircularis
- †Montlivaltia – report made of unidentified related form or using admittedly obsolete nomenclature
- †Mucrovenator – type locality for genus
  - †Mucrovenator minimus – type locality for species
- †Mullericeras – type locality for genus
  - †Mullericeras fergusoni – type locality for species
  - †Mullericeras spitiense
- †Myalina
  - †Myalina postcarbonica
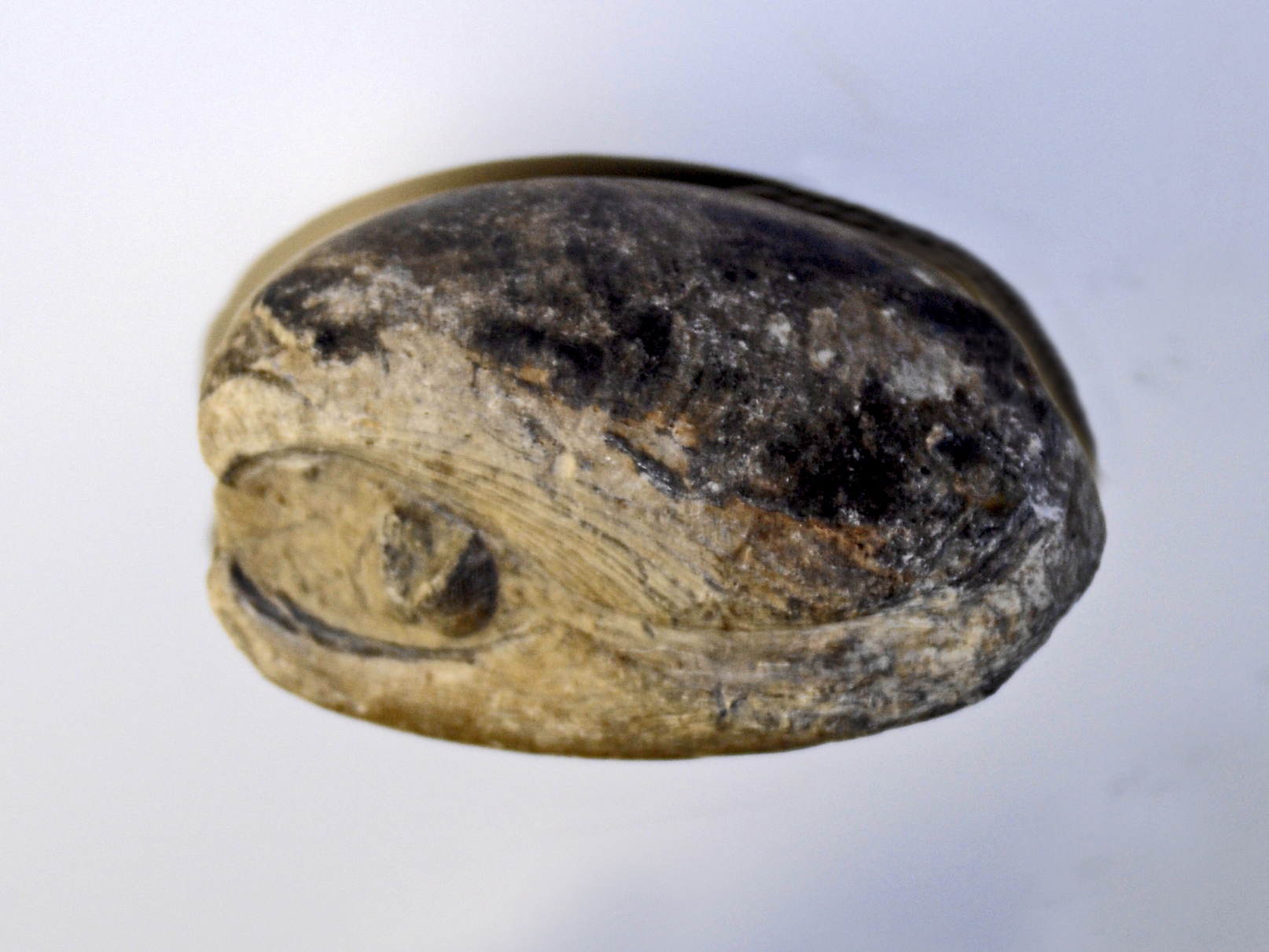
- Fossilized shell of the Late Cretaceous marine bivalve Myophoria
  †Myophoria
  - †Myophoria humboldtensis – type locality for species
  - †Myophoria shoshoniensis
- †Myophoricardium
- †Mytilus
  - †Mytilus homfrayi – type locality for species

== N ==
- †Nabolella
- †Naomichelys
- †Nautiloida
- †Neogondolella
  - †Neogondolella mombergensis
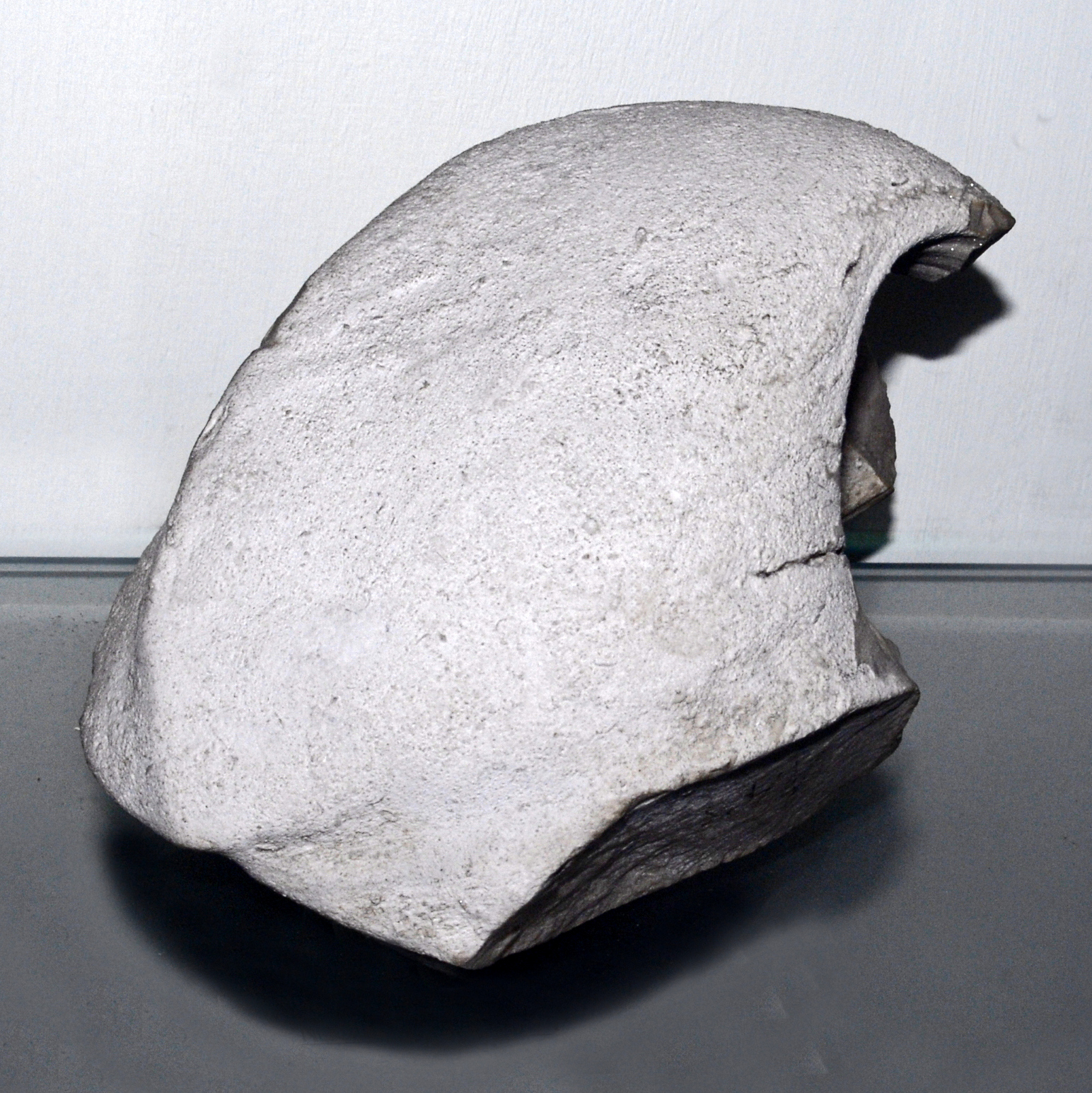
- Fossilized shell of the Triassic bivalve Neomegalodon
  †Neomegalodon
- †Neophyllites – or unidentified comparable form
- †Neoprioniodus
  - †Neoprioniodus unicornus – type locality for species
- †Neoschizodus
  - †Neoschizodus elongatus – type locality for species
- †Nerinea
- †Nevadalithium
- †Nevadapecten – type locality for genus
  - †Nevadapecten lynnae – type locality for species
- †Nevadaphyllites
  - †Nevadaphyllites compressus
  - †Nevadaphyllites microumbilicatus – type locality for species
- †Nevadathalamia
  - †Nevadathalamia cylindrica
- †Nevadisculites
  - †Nevadisculites depressus – type locality for species
  - †Nevadisculites minutus – type locality for species
  - †Nevadisculites smithi – type locality for species
  - †Nevadisculites taylori – type locality for species
- †Nevadites
  - †Nevadites humboldtensis – type locality for species
  - †Nevadites hyatti – type locality for species
- †Nevadoseris
  - †Nevadoseris puncata
  - †Nevadoseris punctata – type locality for species
- †Nicholsites
  - †Nicholsites newpassensis – type locality for species
  - †Nicholsites parisi – type locality for species
  - †Nicholsites tozeri – type locality for species
- †Nitanoceras
  - †Nitanoceras selwyni
- Nodosaria – or unidentified comparable form
- †Noridiscites
- †Nuclana
- Nuculana
- †Nuculoma

== O ==
- †Obnixia – type locality for genus
  - †Obnixia thaynesiana
- †Odoghertyceras
  - †Odoghertyceras deweveri
- †Oedalmia
  - †Oedalmia norica
- †Omanoselache
  - †Omanoselache bucheri – type locality for species
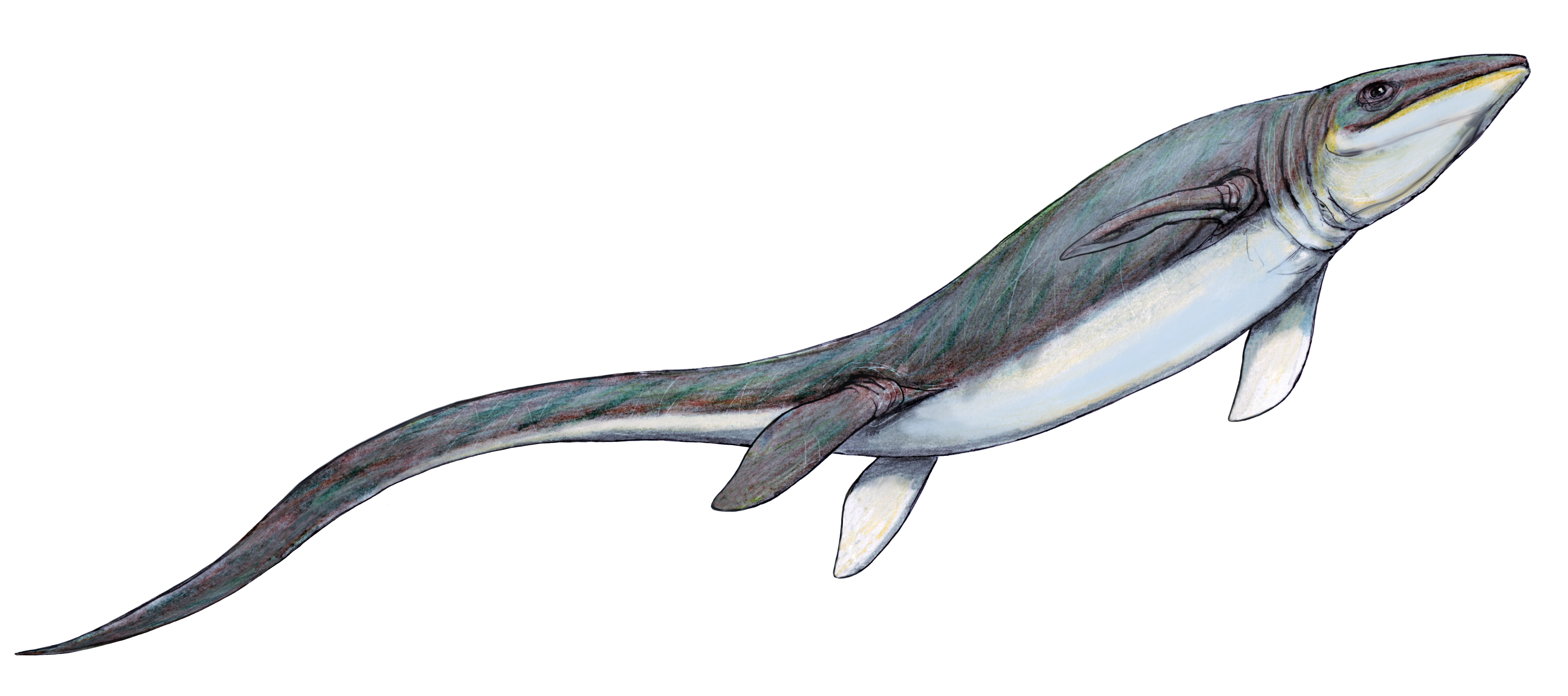
- Life restoration of the Middle-Late Triassic ichthyosaur Omphalosaurus
  †Omphalosaurus – type locality for genus
  - †Omphalosaurus nevadanus – type locality for species
- †Ophiceras
  - †Ophiceras sakuntala
- †Oppelismilia
- †Orthoceras
  - †Orthoceras blakei – type locality for species
- Ostrea
- †Oulodus
  - †Oulodus triassica – type locality for species
- †Owenites
  - †Owenites koeneni
- †Oxylongobardites
  - †Oxylongobardites acutus – type locality for species
- †Oxytoma
  - †Oxytoma grantsvillensis – type locality for species
  - †Oxytoma inequivalvis
- †Ozarkodina
  - †Ozarkodina brevis – or unidentified related form
  - †Ozarkodina mulleri – type locality for species
  - †Ozarkodina nevadensis – type locality for species
  - †Ozarkodina raridenticulata – type locality for species
  - †Ozarkodina triassica – type locality for species

== P ==
- †Palaeastraea
  - †Palaeastraea decussata – or unidentified comparable form
  - †Palaeastraea descussata
- †Palaeobates
  - †Palaeobates shastensis – or unidentified comparable form
- †Palaeolima
  - †Palaeolima newpassensis – type locality for species
- †Palaeospinax – tentative report
- †Pamiroseris
  - †Pamiroseris rectilamellosa
- †Parachirognathus
  - †Parachirognathus ethingtoni – type locality for species
  - †Parachirognathus geiseri – type locality for species
- †Paracrochordiceras
  - †Paracrochordiceras americanum
  - †Paracrochordiceras mclearni – type locality for species
  - †Paracrochordiceras plicatus
  - †Paracrochordiceras silberlingi – type locality for species
- †Paradanubites
  - †Paradanubites crassicostatus – type locality for species
- †Parafrechites
  - †Parafrechites dunni – type locality for species
  - †Parafrechites meeki – type locality for species
- †Paragymnites
  - †Paragymnites symmetricus
- †Parahedenstroemia
  - †Parahedenstroemia kiparisovae
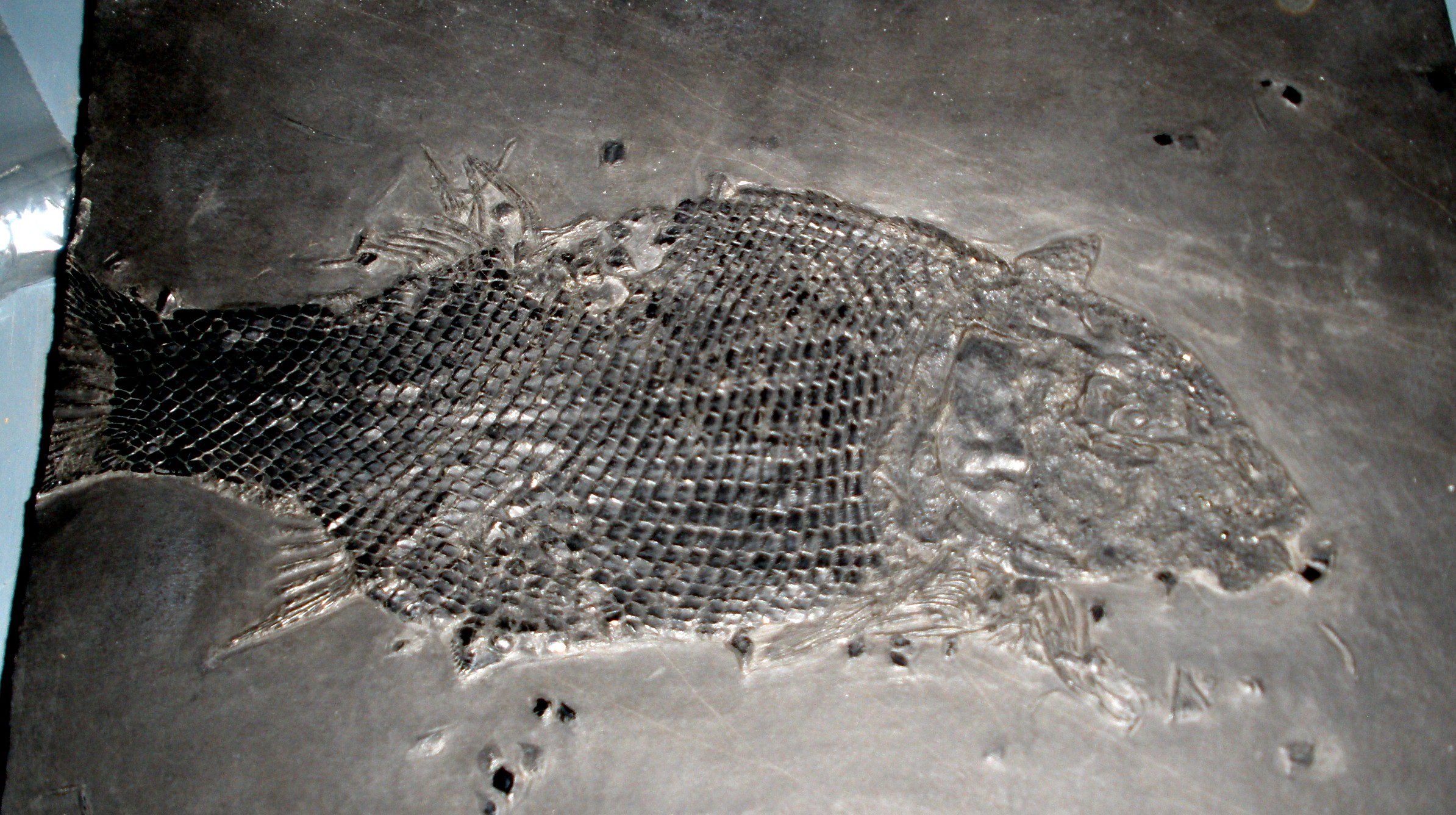
- Fossilized skeleton of the Triassic bony fish Paralepidotus
  †Paralepidotus – tentative report
- †Parallelodon
- †Paranannites
  - †Paranannites aspenensis
  - †Paranannites mulleri
  - †Paranannites slossi
- †Paranautilus
  - †Paranautilus multicameratus – type locality for species
  - †Paranautilus smithi – type locality for species
- †Paranevadites
  - †Paranevadites furlongi – type locality for species
  - †Paranevadites gabbi – type locality for species
- †Paratrachyceras
- †Paratriassoastrum
  - †Paratriassoastrum crassum
- †Parussuria
  - †Parussuria compressa
- †Parvidiabolus
  - †Parvidiabolus onvexus – or unidentified related form
- †Parvigondolella
- †Pegmavalvula
  - †Pegmavalvula triassica – type locality for species
- †Permophorus
  - †Permophorus bregeri
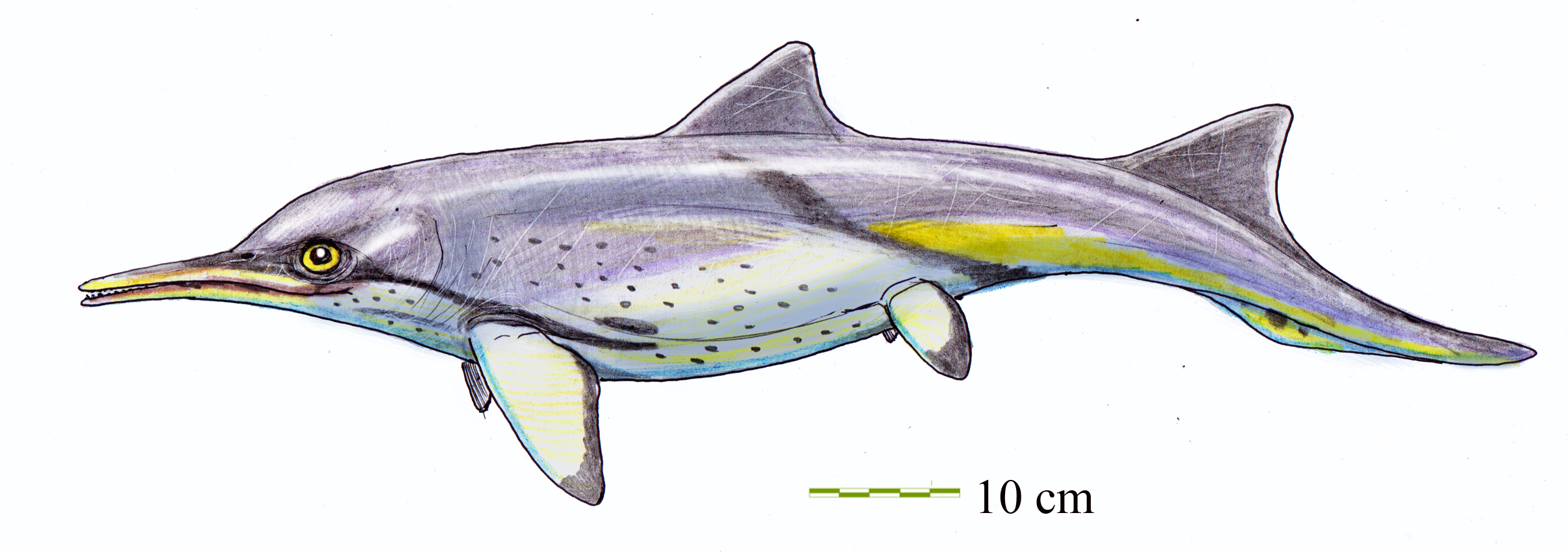
- Life restoration of the Triassic ichthyosaur Phalarodon
  †Phalarodon
  - †Phalarodon fraasi
- †Phloioceras
  - †Phloioceras mulieri
- Pholadomya
- †Phragmotrypa – type locality for genus
  - †Phragmotrypa ordinata – type locality for species
- †Piarorhynchella
  - †Piarorhynchella triassica
- †Pinacophyllum
  - †Pinacophyllum parallelum – or unidentified comparable form
- Pinna
- †Placites
  - †Placites humboldtensis – type locality for species
- †Placunopsis
- †Plafkerium
  - †Plafkerium keloense – or unidentified related form
- †Plagiostoma
  - †Plagiostoma acutum – type locality for species
  - †Plagiostoma striatum
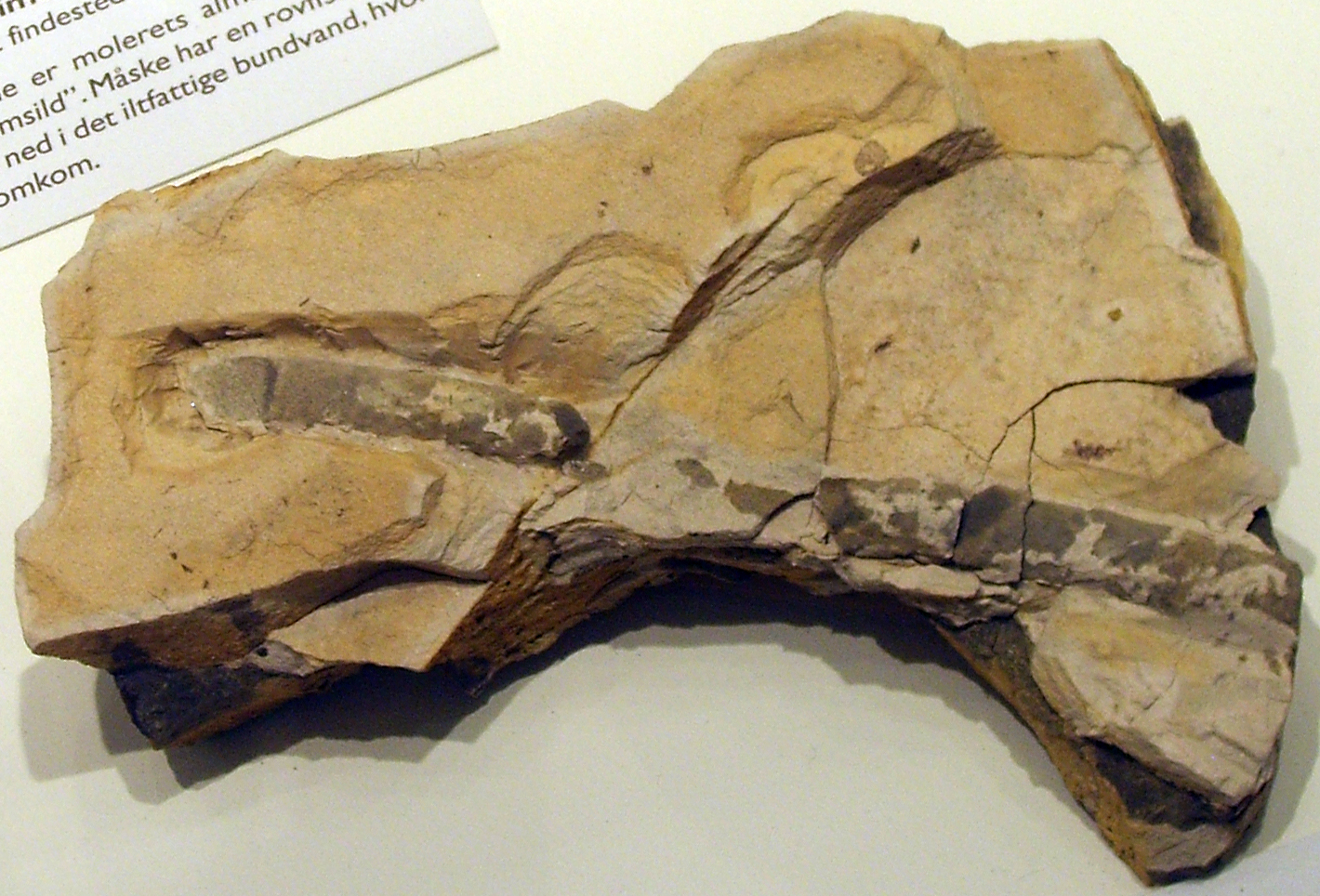
- Fossils of the burrow ichnogenus Planolites
  †Planolites
- †Platycuccoceras
  - †Platycuccoceras bonaevistae – type locality for species
  - †Platycuccoceras cainense – type locality for species
  - †Platycuccoceras favretense – type locality for species
  - †Platycuccoceras praebalatonensis – type locality for species
  - †Platycuccoceras rugosum – type locality for species
  - †Platycuccoceras silberlingi – type locality for species
  - †Platycuccoceras tozeri – type locality for species
- †Plectoconcha
  - †Plectoconcha aequiplicata – type locality for species
  - †Plectoconcha newbyi – type locality for species
- †Plectodiscus
  - †Plectodiscus berlinensis – type locality for species
- †Plesiechinus
  - †Plesiechinus hawkinsi – type locality for species
- †Pleurofrechites
  - †Pleurofrechites johnstoni – type locality for species
- †Pleuromya
  - †Pleuromya humboldtensis – type locality for species
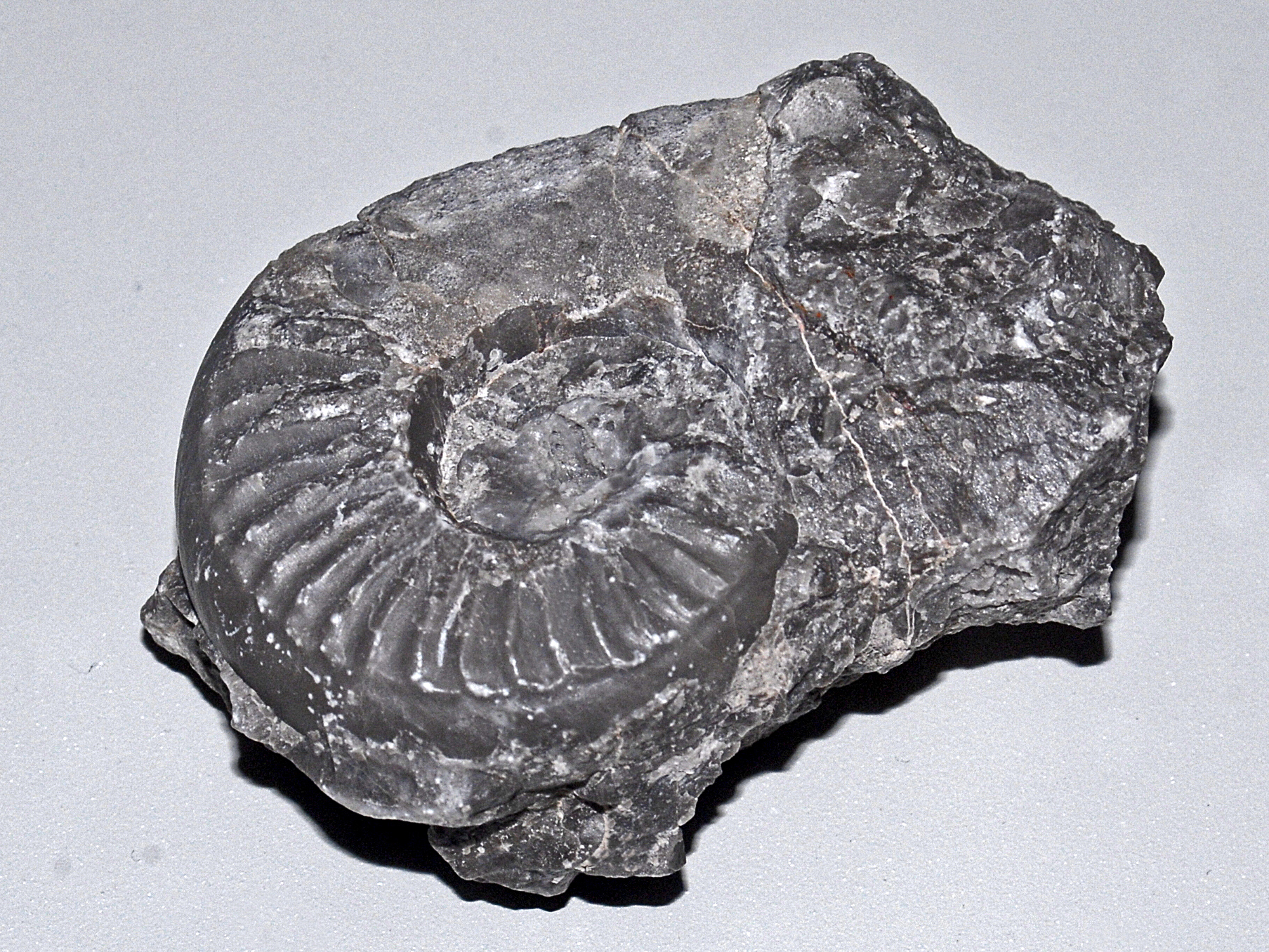
- Fossilized shell of the Carboniferous-Triassic nautiloid cephalopod Pleuronautilus
  †Pleuronautilus
- †Pleuronectites
  - †Pleuronectites meeki – type locality for species
  - †Pleuronectites newelli – type locality for species
- Plicatula
  - †Plicatula perimbricata
- †Polyacrodus
  - †Polyacrodus tregoi – type locality for species
- †Polycystocoelia
  - †Polycystocoelia silberlingi – type locality for species
- †Posidonia
  - †Posidonia blatchleyi
  - †Posidonia daytonensis – type locality for species
  - †Posidonia stella – type locality for species
- †Preflorianites
  - †Preflorianites toulai
- †Primatella
  - †Primatella asymmetrica
  - †Primatella conservativa
  - †Primatella mersinensis
  - †Primatella orchardi
- †Prioniodina
  - †Prioniodina montellensis – type locality for species
- †Proarcestes
  - †Proarcestes balfouri – type locality for species
  - †Proarcestes bramantei – or unidentified comparable form
  - †Proarcestes gabbi – type locality for species
  - †Proarcestes nevadanus – type locality for species
- †Proclydonautilus
- †Prohungarites
  - †Prohungarites lenticularis – type locality for species
  - †Prohungarites submckelvei – type locality for species
- †Promyalina
- †Promysidiella
  - †Promysidiella desatoyensis – type locality for species
  - †Promysidiella otiosa – or unidentified related form
  - †Promysidiella planirecta – type locality for species
- †Proptychites
  - †Proptychites ammonoides – or unidentified comparable form
  - †Proptychites haydeni
  - †Proptychites pagei – type locality for species
  - †Proptychites trilobatus – or unidentified comparable form
- †Proteusites
  - †Proteusites fergusoni – type locality for species
  - †Proteusites weitschati – type locality for species
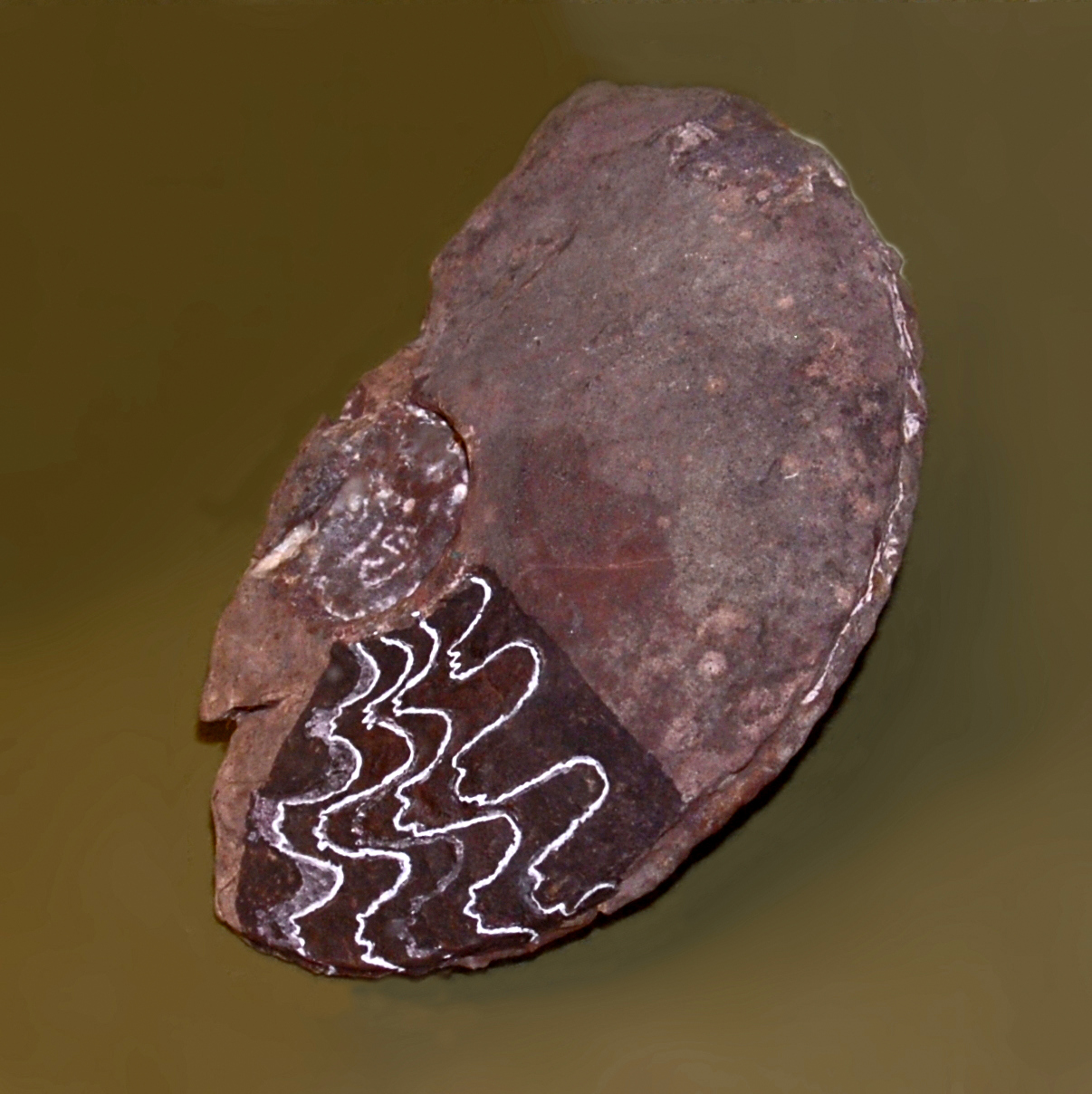
- Fossilized shell of the Triassic ammonoid cephalopod Protrachyceras
  †Protrachyceras
  - †Protrachyceras sikanianum – or unidentified related form
  - †Protrachyceras springeri – type locality for species
- †Pseudacrochordiceras
  - †Pseudacrochordiceras inyoense
- †Pseudaetomoceras
  - †Pseudaetomoceras shoshonense – type locality for species
- †Pseudaspenites
  - †Pseudaspenites balinii – type locality for species
- †Pseudaspidites
  - †Pseudaspidites silberlingi – type locality for species
  - †Pseudaspidites wheeleri
- †Pseudodanubites
  - †Pseudodanubites dixiensis – type locality for species
  - †Pseudodanubites halli
  - †Pseudodanubites nicholsi – type locality for species
- †Pseudokeyserlingites
  - †Pseudokeyserlingites guexi – type locality for species
- †Pseudolimea
  - †Pseudolimea naumani
- †Pseudomonotis
  - †Pseudomonotis circularis
- †Pseudoplacunopsis
  - †Pseudoplacunopsis fissistriata – or unidentified related form
- †Pseudosageceras
  - †Pseudosageceras augustum
  - †Pseudosageceras multilobatum
- †Pseudospondylospira
  - †Pseudospondylospira perplexa
- †Pseudosvalbardiceras – tentative report
  - †Pseudosvalbardiceras humboldtense – type locality for species
- †Pseudotropites
  - †Pseudotropites ultratriasicus
- †Psiloceras
  - †Psiloceras marcouxi
  - †Psiloceras pacificum
  - †Psiloceras spelae
  - †Psiloceras tilmanni
- †Pteronisculus
  - †Pteronisculus nevadanus – type locality for species
- †Ptychites
  - †Ptychites densistriatus – type locality for species
  - †Ptychites evansi – type locality for species
  - †Ptychites gradinarui – type locality for species
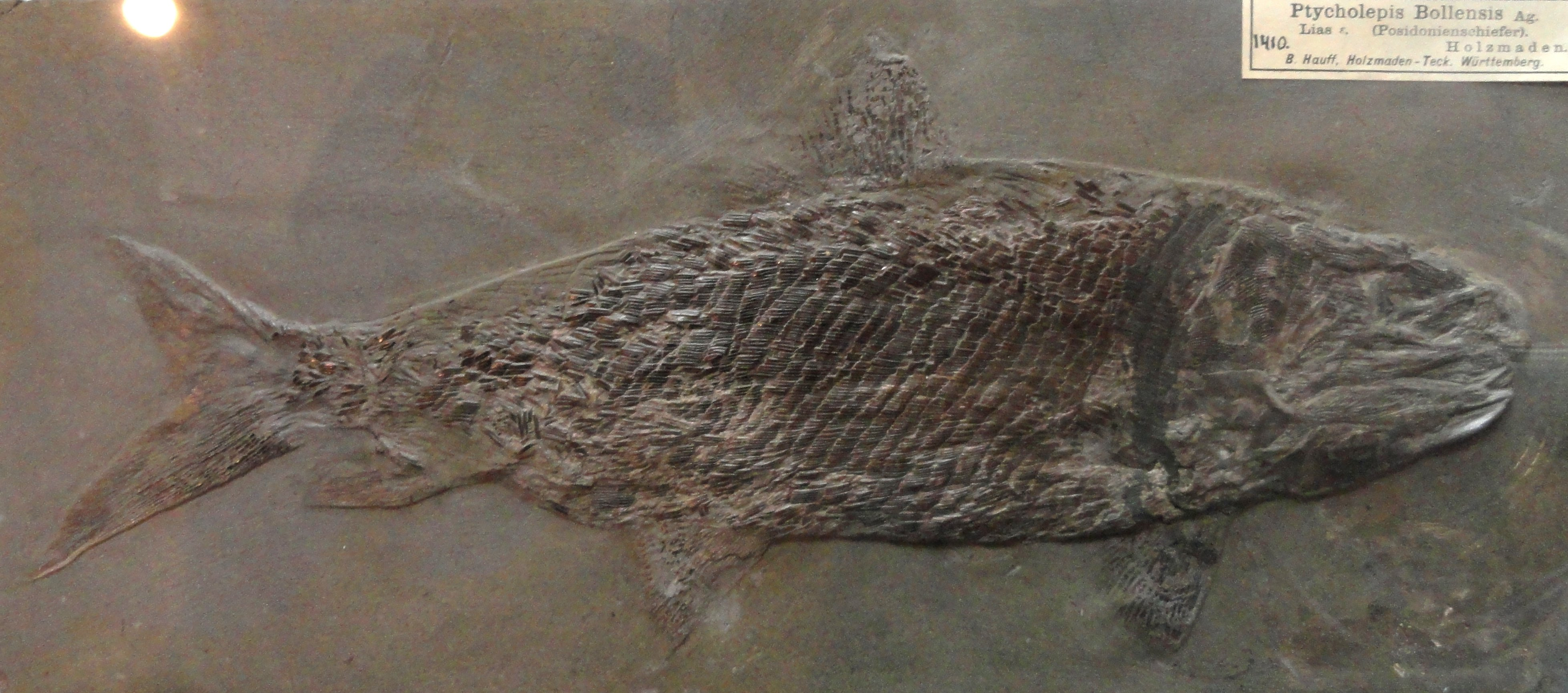
- Fossilized skeleton of the bony fish Ptycholepis
  †Ptycholepis – tentative report
- †Pyknotylacanthus
  - †Pyknotylacanthus humboldtensis – type locality for species

== R ==
- †Radioceras
  - †Radioceras evolvens – or unidentified comparable form
  - †Radioceras kraffti – or unidentified comparable form
- †Retiophyllia
  - †Retiophyllia delicatula
  - †Retiophyllia fenestrata
  - †Retiophyllia nevadae – type locality for species
  - †Retiophyllia norica
- †Rhabdoceras
  - †Rhabdoceras suessi
- †Rhacophyllites
  - †Rhacophyllites debilis
- †Rhaetina
  - †Rhaetina gregaria – type locality for species
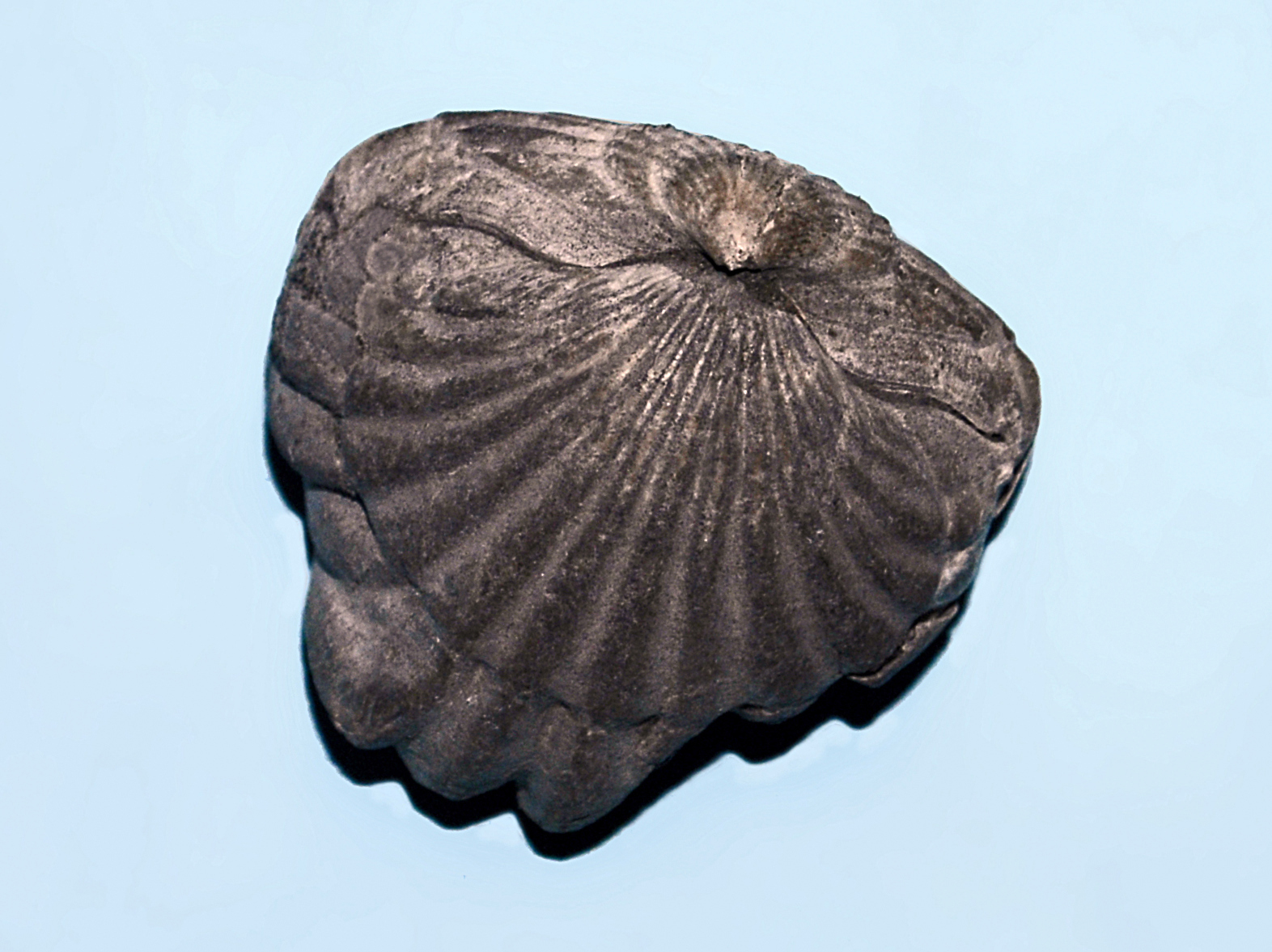
- Fossilized shell of the Silurian-Eocene articulate brachiopod Rhynchonella
  †Rhynchonella – report made of unidentified related form or using admittedly obsolete nomenclature
  - †Rhynchonella lingulata – type locality for species
- †Rhynchopterus – type locality for genus
  - †Rhynchopterus obesus – type locality for species
- †Rieberites
  - †Rieberites transiformis – type locality for species
- †Rieppelites
  - †Rieppelites boletzkyi – type locality for species
  - †Rieppelites cimeganus
  - †Rieppelites shevyrevi – type locality for species

== S ==
- †Sageceras
  - †Sageceras gabbi – type locality for species
  - †Sageceras walteri
- †Sagenites
  - †Sagenites minaensis – type locality for species
  - †Sagenites striata – type locality for species
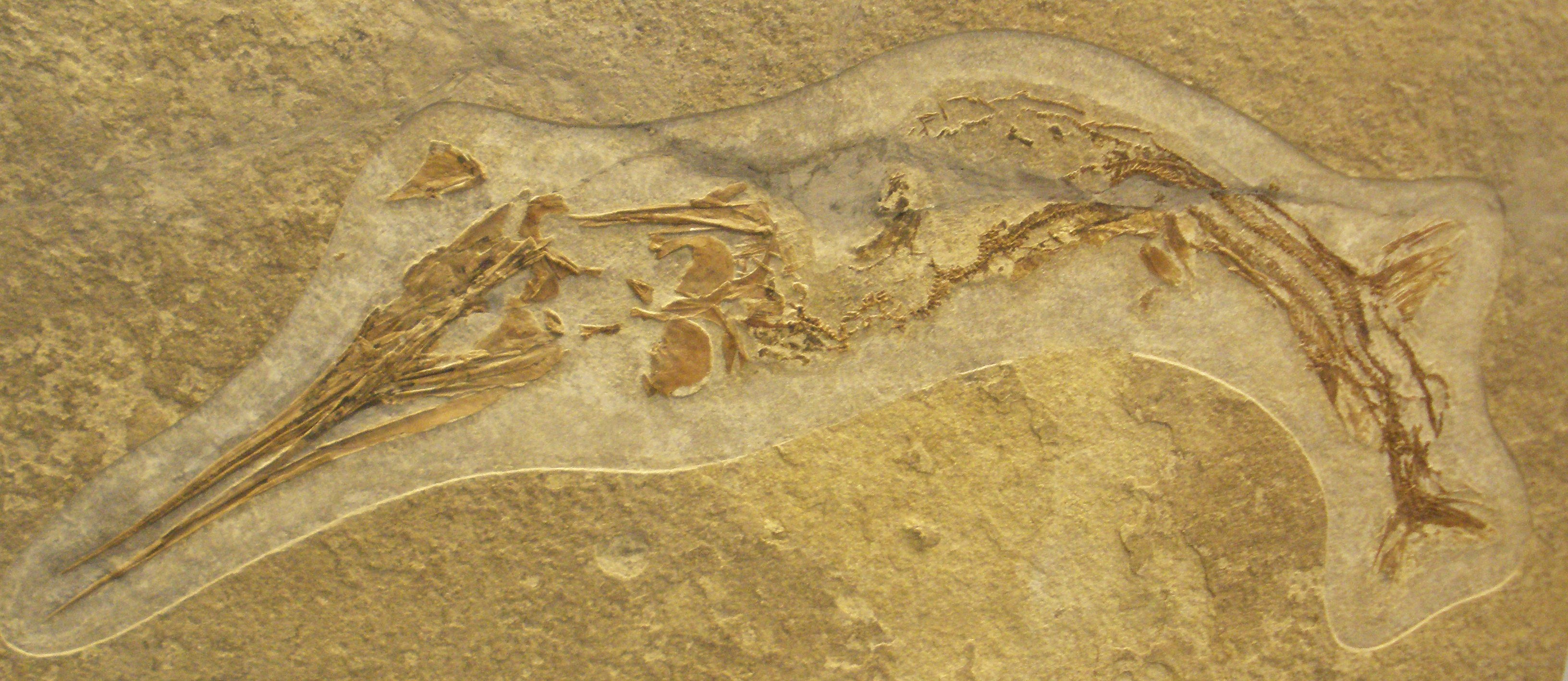
- Fossilized skeleton of the Early Triassic-Middle Jurassic bony fish Saurichthys
  †Saurichthys
- †Schafhaeutlia
- †Schlotheimia
  - †Schlotheimia cuevitensis – or unidentified comparable form
- †Schreinbachites
  - †Schreinbachites laqueoides – or unidentified related form
- †Semibeyrichites
- †Septocardia
- †Septocardita
- †Septocarditia
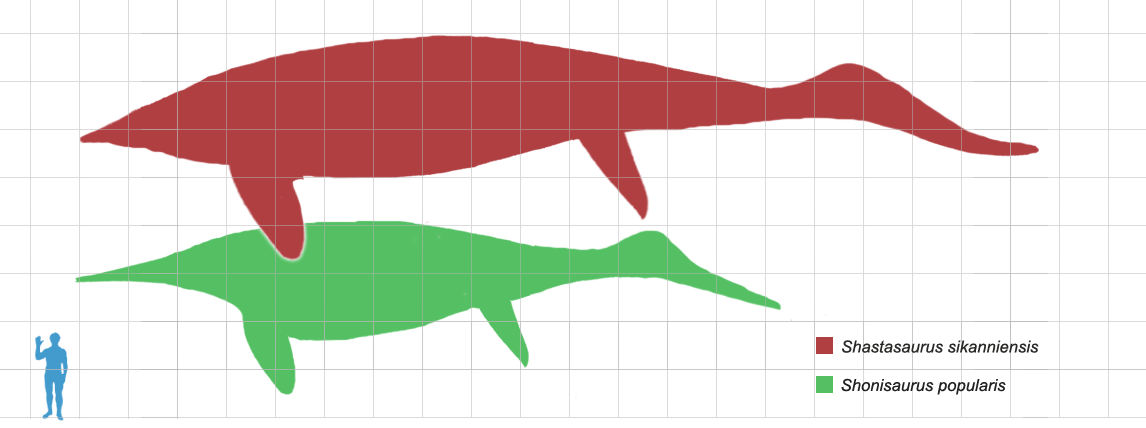
- Diagram illustrating Shonisaurus (green) and Shastasaurus sikanniensis (red) with an anachronistic human to scale
  †Shonisaurus
  - †Shonisaurus popularis
- †Sibyllonautilus
  - †Sibyllonautilus fergusoni – type locality for species
- †Silberlingeria
  - †Silberlingeria rubyae – type locality for species
- †Silberlingites
  - †Silberlingites mulleri – type locality for species
  - †Silberlingites tregoi – type locality for species
- †Silberlingitoides
  - †Silberlingitoides clarkei – type locality for species
  - †Silberlingitoides cricki – type locality for species
  - †Silberlingitoides praecursor – type locality for species
- †Sirenites
  - †Sirenites homfrayi – type locality for species
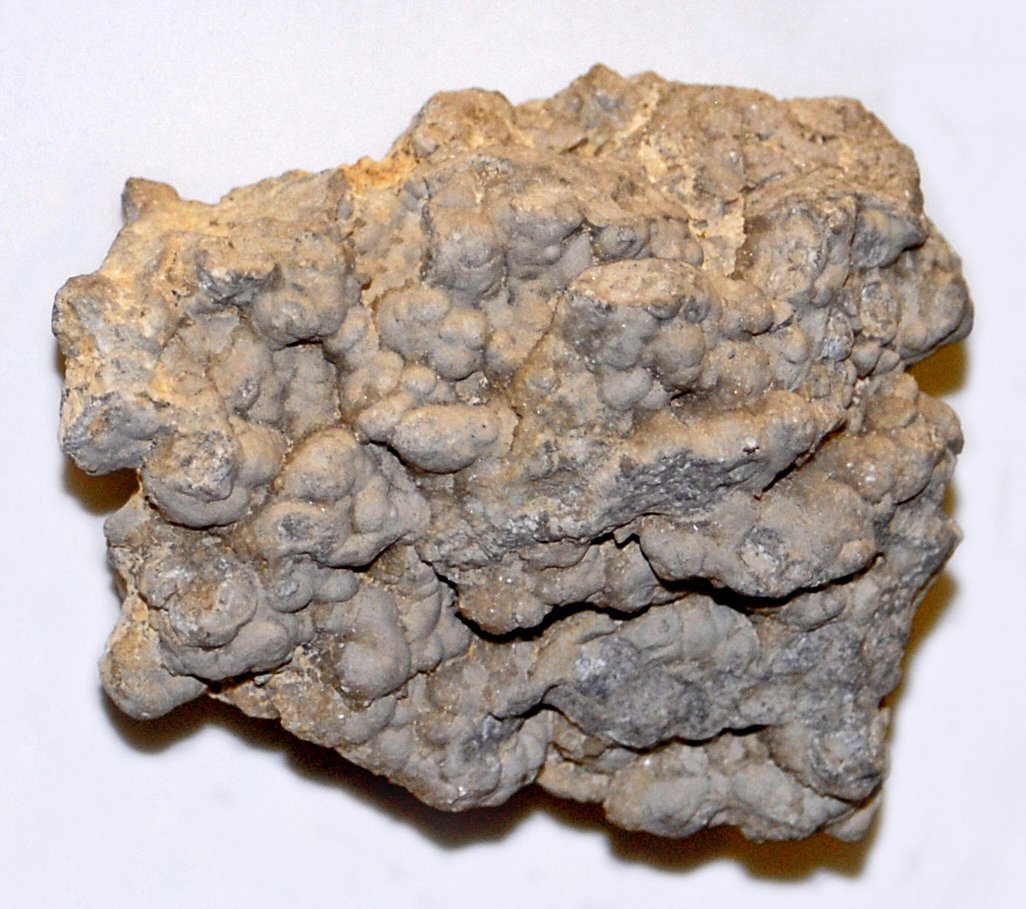
- Fossils of the red alga Solenopora
  †Solenopora
- †Sphaera – report made of unidentified related form or using admittedly obsolete nomenclature
  - †Sphaera whitneyi – type locality for species
- †Spiriferina
  - †Spiriferina alia
  - †Spiriferina homfrayi – type locality for species
  - †Spiriferina roundyi
- †Spirigera – or unidentified comparable form
- Spiroplectammina
- †Spondylospira
  - †Spondylospira lewesensis
  - †Spondylospira tricosta – type locality for species
- †Spongiomorpha
  - †Spongiomorpha gibbosa
  - †Spongiomorpha minor – or unidentified comparable form
  - †Spongiomorpha tenuis
- †Stenopopanoceras
- †Stikinoceras
  - †Stikinoceras kerri
- †Storthoceras
  - †Storthoceras garfieldense – type locality for species
- †Stromatomorpha
  - †Stromatomorpha califormica – or unidentified comparable form
- †Stuoresimorpha
  - †Stuoresimorpha norica – or unidentified comparable form
- †Sturia
  - †Sturia japonica – or unidentified comparable form
- †Styrionautilus
- †Styrites
  - †Styrites tropitiformis – or unidentified comparable form
- †Subvishnuites
  - †Subvishnuites stokesi
- †Sulioticeras
  - †Sulioticeras intermedium – or unidentified comparable form
- †Syringoceras
  - †Syringoceras spurri – type locality for species

== T ==
- †Tetsaoceras
  - †Tetsaoceras hayesi
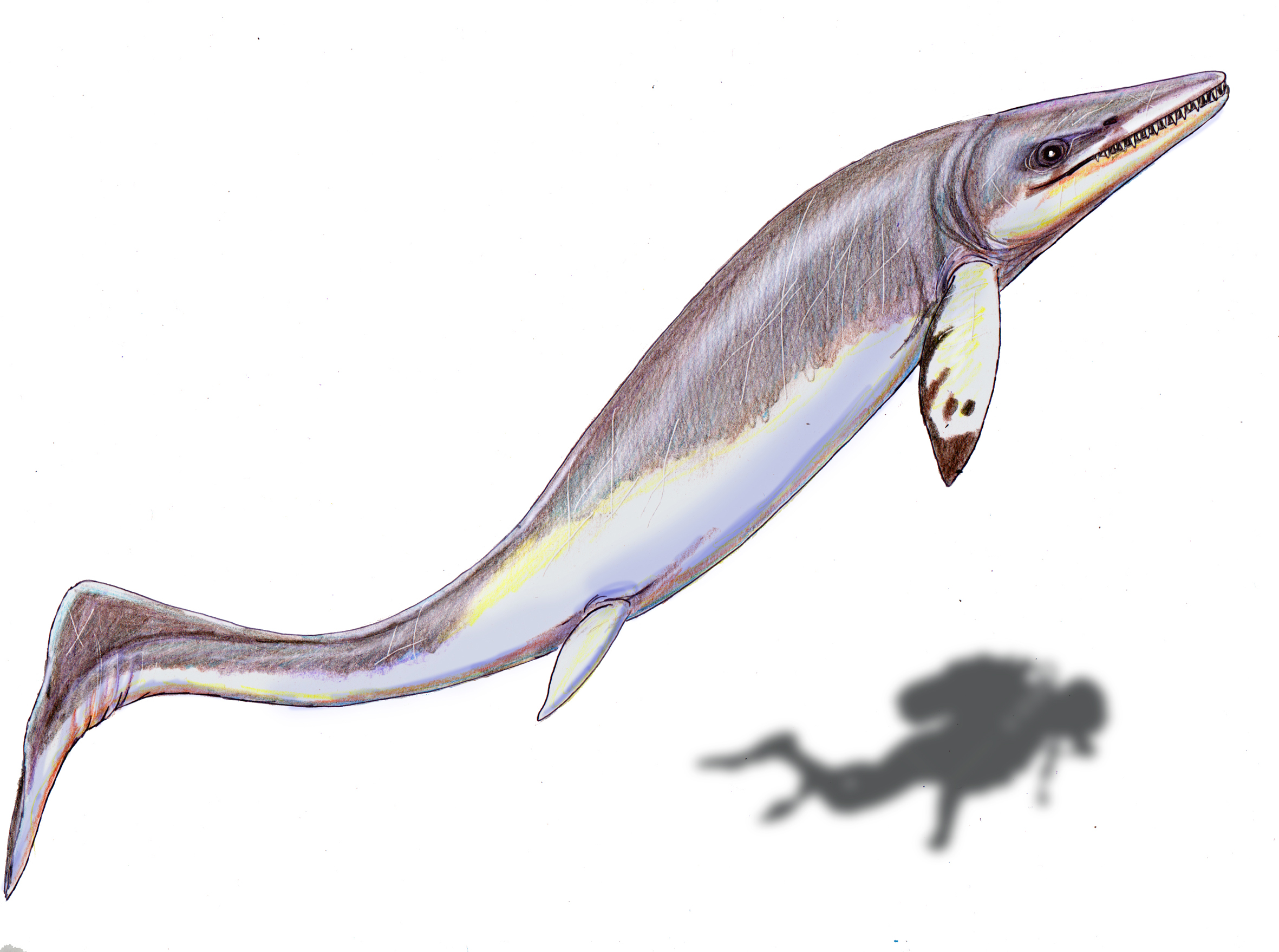
- Life restoration of the Middle Triassic ichthyosaur Thalattoarchon
  †Thalattoarchon – type locality for genus
  - †Thalattoarchon saurophagis – type locality for species
- †Thamnasteria
  - †Thamnasteria borealis
  - †Thamnasteria rectimellosa
  - †Thamnasteria smithi
- †Thanamites
  - †Thanamites contractus – type locality for species
- †Thecosmilia – report made of unidentified related form or using admittedly obsolete nomenclature
- †Tipperoceras – type locality for genus
  - †Tipperoceras mullerense – type locality for species
- †Tmaegoceras
  - †Tmaegoceras nudaries – type locality for species
- †Tozerites
  - †Tozerites gemmellaroi
  - †Tozerites humboldtensis – type locality for species
  - †Tozerites polygyratus – type locality for species
- †Trachyceras
  - †Trachyceras silberlingi – type locality for species
- †Trichites
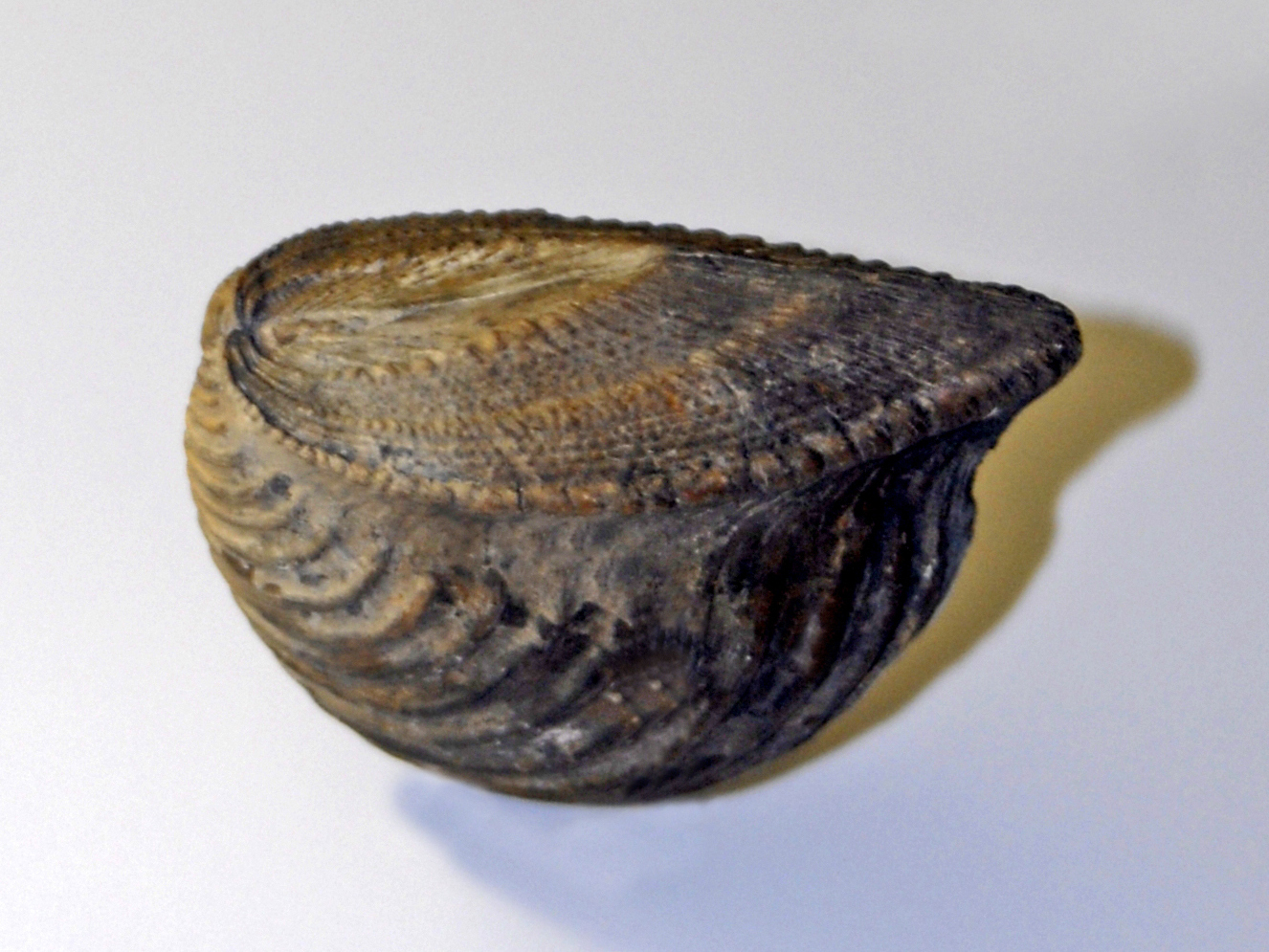
- Fossilized shell of the Permian-Paleocene marine bivalve Trigonia
  †Trigonia
  - †Trigonia hemisphaerica – or unidentified related form
- †Tropiceitites
  - †Tropiceitites columbianus
- †Tropiceltites
- †Tropigastrites
  - †Tropigastrites lahontanus – type locality for species
  - †Tropigastrites louderbacki – type locality for species
- †Tropigymnites
  - †Tropigymnites planorbis – or unidentified comparable form
- †Tropites
  - †Tropites crassicostatus
  - †Tropites latiumbilicatus
  - †Tropites nevadanus
  - †Tropites nodosus
  - †Tropites subquadratus
- †Tropithisbites
  - †Tropithisbites densicostatus
- †Tutcheria

== U ==
- †Umbrostrea
  - †Umbrostrea montiscaprilis – or unidentified comparable form
- †Unionites
  - †Unionites carinata
- †Unionvillites
  - †Unionvillites asseretoi – type locality for species
  - †Unionvillites hadleyi – type locality for species
- †Ussuridiscus
- †Ussurites
  - †Ussurites arthaberi – or unidentified comparable form
  - †Ussurites detwilleri – type locality for species

== V ==
- †Vandaites
  - †Vandaites newyorkensis – type locality for species
- †Vaugonia
  - †Vaugonia vancouverensis – or unidentified comparable form
- †Vavilovites
- †Vermiceras
  - †Vermiceras concavum – type locality for species
  - †Vermiceras densicostatum – type locality for species
  - †Vermiceras mineralense – type locality for species
  - †Vermiceras rursicostatum
- †Vex
  - †Vex semisimplex

== W ==
- †Wasatchites – tentative report
- †Weyla
- †Wyomingites
  - †Wyomingites aplanatus
  - †Wyomingites arnoldi
  - †Wyomingites whiteanus

== X ==
- †Xenoceltites
  - †Xenoceltites youngi
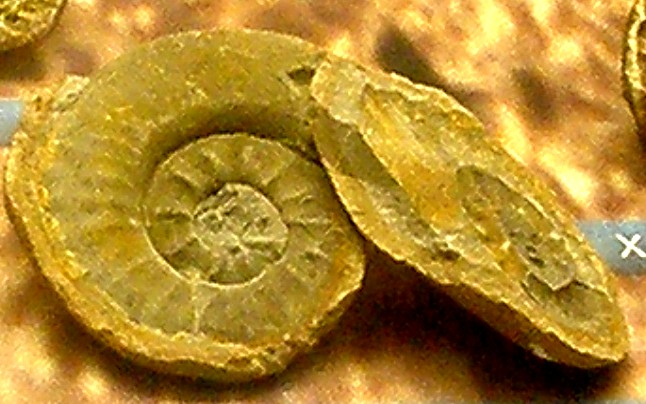
- Fossilized shells of the ammonoid cephalopod Xenodiscus
  †Xenodiscus
  - †Xenodiscus nevadanus

== Z ==
- †Zeilleria
  - †Zeilleria elliptica – or unidentified comparable form
- †Zieglericonus
  - †Zieglericonus rhaeticum
- †Zugmayerella – type locality for genus
  - †Zugmayerella incinata
  - †Zugmayerella uncinata – type locality for species
