= Alanites =

Scientific classification
- Kingdom: Animalia
- Phylum: Mollusca
- Class: Cephalopoda
- Subclass: †Ammonoidea
- Order: †Ceratitida
- Family: †Khvalynitidae
- Genus: †Alanites

Genus of molluscs (fossil)

Alanites is a genus of extinct Triassic ammonoid cephalopods named by Shevyrev, 1968, found in association with Laboceras and Megaphyllites in Siberia and assigned to the ceratitid family Khvlaynitidae which is part of the Dinaritoidea. Its type is Alanites visendus.
