= Paragoceratidae =

Paragoceratidae Temporal range: 251.3–247.2 Ma

Scientific classification
- Kingdom: Animalia
- Phylum: Mollusca
- Class: Cephalopoda
- Subclass: †Ammonoidea
- Order: †Ceratitida
- Superfamily: †Dinaritoidea
- Family: †Paragoceratidae; Guex et al. 2010

Genera
- Ceccaisculitoides; Fengshanites; Isculitoides; Paragoceras

Extinct family of molluscs

Paragoceratidae is an extinct family of ammonoids in the superfamily Dinaritoidea.
