= Anagymnites =

Anagymnites Temporal range: Anisian 245.0–237.0 Ma

Scientific classification
- Domain: Eukaryota
- Kingdom: Animalia
- Phylum: Mollusca
- Class: Cephalopoda
- Subclass: †Ammonoidea
- Order: †Ceratitida
- Family: †Gymnitidae
- Genus: †Anagymnites; Hyatt, 1900

Species
- See Text

Extinct genus of molluscs

Anagymnites is an extinct genus of cephalopods belonging to the Ammonite subclass.
