= Ceccaisculitoides =

Ceccaisculitoides Temporal range: Spathian

Scientific classification
- Kingdom: Animalia
- Phylum: Mollusca
- Class: Cephalopoda
- Subclass: †Ammonoidea
- Order: †Ceratitida
- Family: †Paragoceratidae
- Genus: †Ceccaisculitoides; Guex et al. 2005

Species
- †Ceccaisculitoides elegans Guex et al. 2005 (type); †Ceccaisculitoides hammondi (Kummel 1969)

Genus of molluscs (fossil)

Ceccaisculitoides is an extinct genus of ammonoids in the family Paragoceratidae. The genus name is a tribute to Fabrizzio Cecca, researcher at Pierre-and-Marie-Curie University, Paris.

The type species is C. elegans. The type specimen is named JGX-1004. It is 23 mm wide. It comes from North Humboldt Range, Nevada (level JGX-2360B).
