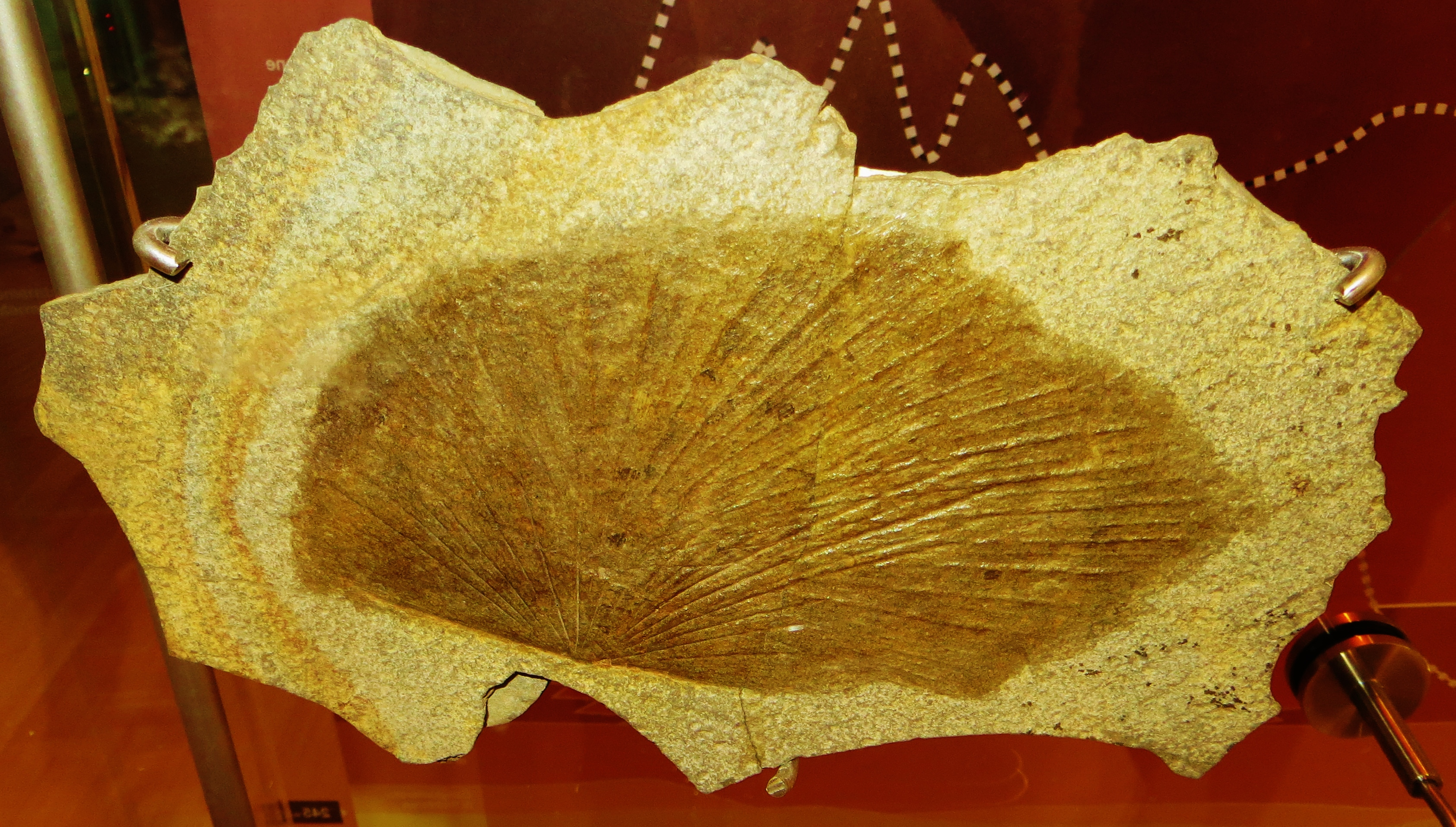
- Fossil Daonella

Scientific classification
- Kingdom: Animalia
- Phylum: Mollusca
- Class: Bivalvia
- Order: Pteriida
- Superfamily: Pterioidea
- Family: †Posidoniidae
- Genus: †Daonella

= Daonella =

Daonella Temporal range: Middle Triassic–Late Triassic

Genus of bivalves

Daonella is a genus of oyster-like saltwater clams, marine bivalve mollusks which lived in the middle to late Triassic period. They are related to the genera Aparimella and Halobia. Since they were ubiquitous in the Arctic, Tethys and Panthalassa seas, they are frequently used as index fossils in dating rocks to the Triassic period. However, the systematic classification of the Daonella is still an area of ongoing research.
