= Arctoprionites =

Arctoprionites Temporal range: Triassic

Scientific classification
- Kingdom: Animalia
- Phylum: Mollusca
- Class: Cephalopoda
- Subclass: †Ammonoidea
- Order: †Ceratitida
- Family: †Prionitidae
- Genus: †Arctoprionites; Spath, 1930

Genus of molluscs (fossil)

Arctoprionites is a genus of extinct ammonites (s.l.) from the Triassic, belonging to the ceratitid family Prionitidae. It has been found in Canada in British Columbia, in Japan, Kazakhstan, and in the U.S. in Nevada.
