= Dinaritoidea =

Dinaritoidea Temporal range: Triassic

Scientific classification
- Kingdom: Animalia
- Phylum: Mollusca
- Class: Cephalopoda
- Subclass: †Ammonoidea
- Order: †Ceratitida
- Superfamily: †Dinaritoidea (Mojsisovics 1882)

Families
- †Columbitidae; †Dinaritidae; †Hellenitidae; †Khvalynitidae; †Paragoceratidae; †Tirolitidae

Synonyms
- †Dinaritaceae Mojsisovics 1882; †Hellenitidae Kummel 1952

Extinct superfamily of molluscs

Dinaritoidea is an extinct superfamily of ammonoids in the order Ceratitida.
