= Anasibirites =

Anasibirites Temporal range: Olenekian

Scientific classification
- Kingdom: Animalia
- Phylum: Mollusca
- Class: Cephalopoda
- Subclass: †Ammonoidea
- Order: †Ceratitida
- Family: †Prionitidae
- Genus: †Anasibirites; Mojsisovics, 1896

Species
- †A. kingianus (Waagen, 1895); †A. multiformis Welter, 1922

Genus of molluscs (fossil)

Anasibirites is an extinct genus of ammonoid cephalopod from the lower upper Smithian Wasatchites distractus Zone (Olenekian, Lower Triassic).

== Distribution and diversity ==
Anasibirites is characterized by a cosmopolitan distribution, which is unusual for Smithian aged ammonoids and probably a consequence of the Smithian-Spathian boundary extinction. Although about 60 species were erected, only two are valid, A. kingianus (Waagen, 1895) and A. multiformis Welter, 1922.
