= Arctohungarites =

Scientific classification
- Kingdom: Animalia
- Phylum: Mollusca
- Class: Cephalopoda
- Subclass: Ammonoidea
- Order: Ceratitida
- Family: Danubitidae
- Genus: Arctohungarites Diener, 1916

Genus of molluscs (fossil)

Arctohungarites is a genus of Triassic ammonoids now placed in the ceratitid family Danubitidae, but previously included in the Hungeritidae.

The shell of Arctohungerites is subdiscoidal, involute, with a rounded venter, weak sigmoidal folds on the body chamber and a distinct ventral keel on the distal end of the chambered portion. The suture is ceratitic.

Arctohungerites was found in Middle Triassic (Anisian) sediments in northern Siberia
