= Zieglericonus =

Zieglericonus Temporal range: Late Triassic, Rhaetian

Scientific classification
- Domain: Eukaryota
- Kingdom: Animalia
- Phylum: Chordata
- Infraphylum: Agnatha
- Class: †Conodonta
- Genus: †Zieglericonus; Kozur & Mock, 1991

Type species
- Zieglericonus rhaeticus † Kozur & Mock, 1991

Extinct genus of jawless fishes

Zieglericonus is an extinct genus of Late Triassic (Rhaetian-age) conodonts, with a simple conical form.
