= Gondolella =

Gondolella Temporal range: Pennsylvanian

Scientific classification
- Kingdom: Animalia
- Phylum: Chordata
- Infraphylum: Agnatha
- Class: †Conodonta
- Order: †Ozarkodinida
- Family: †Gondolellidae
- Genus: †Gondolella; Stauffer & Plummer 1932

Species
- †Gondolella jangpangii Misra et al., 1973; †Gondolella lingulata Gunnell, 1933; †Gondolella merrilli Gunnell, 1933; †Gondolella nitiensis Misra et al., 1973; †Gondolella sinuata Gunnell, 1933; †Gondolella sublanceolata Gunnell, 1933; †Gondolella wardlawi Nestell & Pope in Nestell, Wardlaw & Pope, 2016

Extinct genus of jawless fishes

Gondolella is an extinct genus of conodonts in the family Gondolellidae.
