= List of the Mesozoic life of Idaho =

This list of the Mesozoic life of Idaho contains the various prehistoric life-forms whose fossilized remains have been reported from within the US state of Idaho and are between 252.17 and 66 million years of age.

== A ==
- †Albanites
  - †Albanites americanus – type locality for species
  - †Albanites sheldoni
- †Ampezzopleura – tentative report
  - †Ampezzopleura tenuis – or unidentified comparable form
- †Amphitomaria – tentative report
  - †Amphitomaria obscurecostata – type locality for species
- †Anaflemingites
  - †Anaflemingites russelli – type locality for species
- †Anasibirites
  - †Anasibirites desertorum
  - †Anasibirites lindgreni
- †Andangularia
  - †Andangularia babylona – type locality for species
  - †Andangularia occidentalis – type locality for species
- †Anemia
  - †Anemia fremonti
- †Angularia
  - †Angularia rectecostata – type locality for species
- †Anthostylis
  - †Anthostylis acanthophora
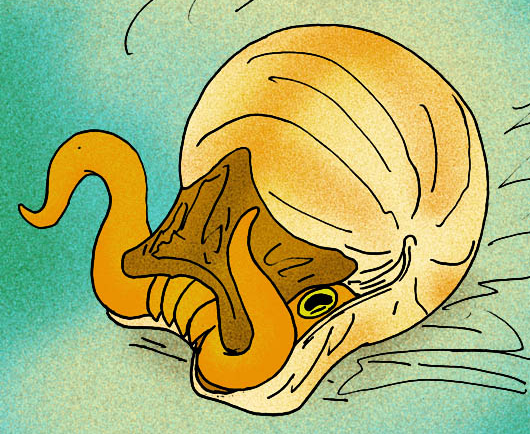
- Life restoration of two species of the Late Triassic ammonoid cephalopod Arcestes
  †Arcestes – tentative report
- †Arctomeekoceras
  - †Arctomeekoceras popovi – type locality for species
  - †Arctomeekoceras tardum – type locality for species
- †Aspenites
  - †Aspenites acutus
- †Aspiduriella – tentative report
  - †Aspiduriella idahoensis – type locality for species
- Astarte
  - †Astarte meeki
- †Astraeomorpha
  - †Astraeomorpha crassisepta
- †Astrocoenia
  - †Astrocoenia idahoensis – type locality for species
- †Austrotindaria
  - †Austrotindaria canalensis
  - †Austrotindaria svalbardensis
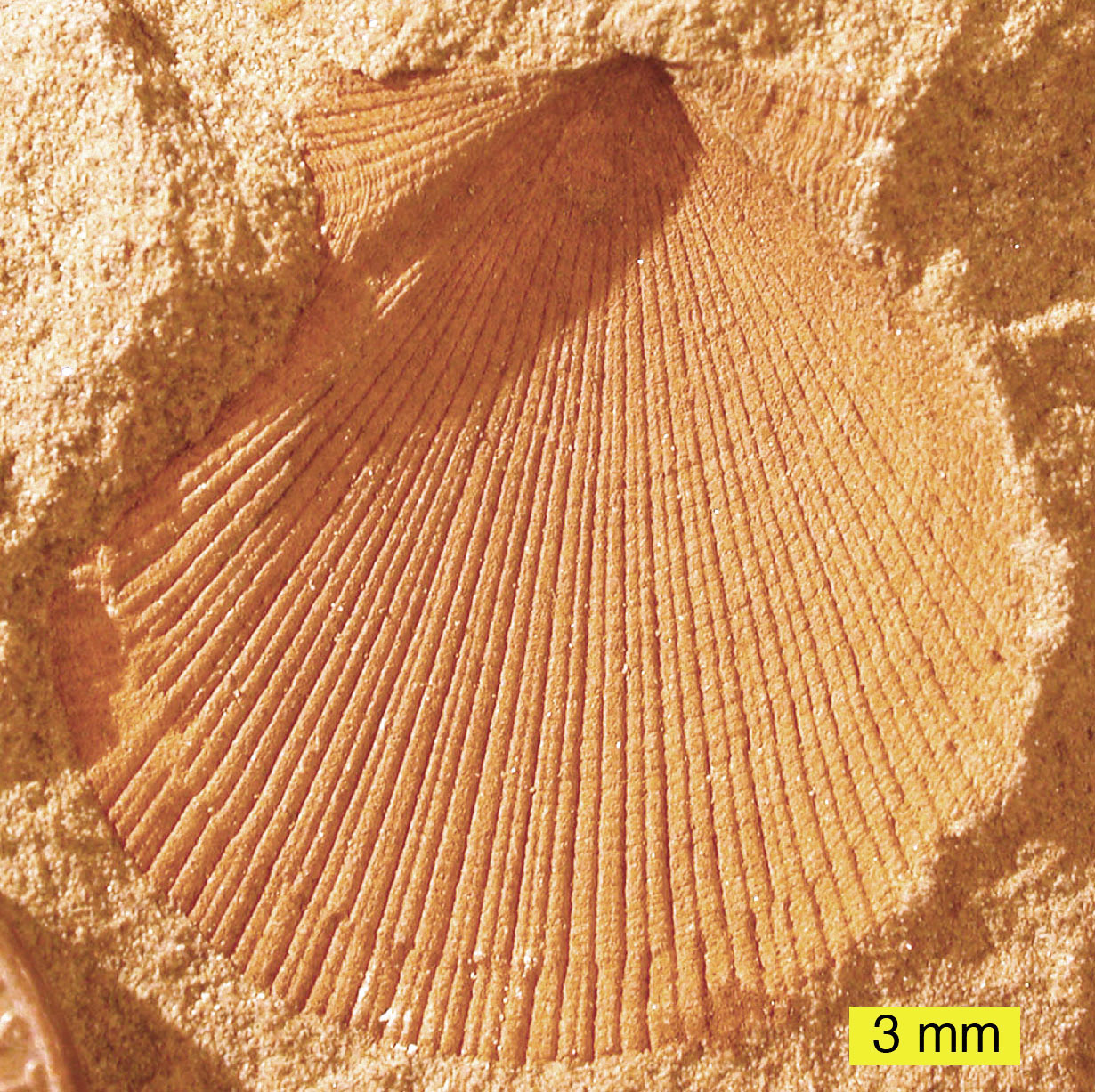
- Mold fossil of a shell of the Early Devonian-Late Triassic bivalve Aviculopecten
  †Aviculopecten – report made of unidentified related form or using admittedly obsolete nomenclature
  - †Aviculopecten altus – type locality for species
  - †Aviculopecten idahoensis
  - †Aviculopecten pealei – type locality for species

== B ==
- †Bajarunia
  - †Bajarunia jacksoni
  - †Bajarunia pilata – type locality for species
  - †Bajarunia pilatum
- †Bakevellia
- †Bakevillia
- †Blodgettella
  - †Blodgettella enormecostata – type locality for species
- †Borestus – tentative report
- †Brochidiella – type locality for genus
  - †Brochidiella idahoensis – type locality for species

== C ==
- †Camptonectes
  - †Camptonectes platessiformis
- †Caribouceras – type locality for genus
  - †Caribouceras slugense – type locality for species
- †Carteria – type locality for genus
  - †Carteria hotspringensis – type locality for species
- †Ceccaisculitoides
  - †Ceccaisculitoides hammondi
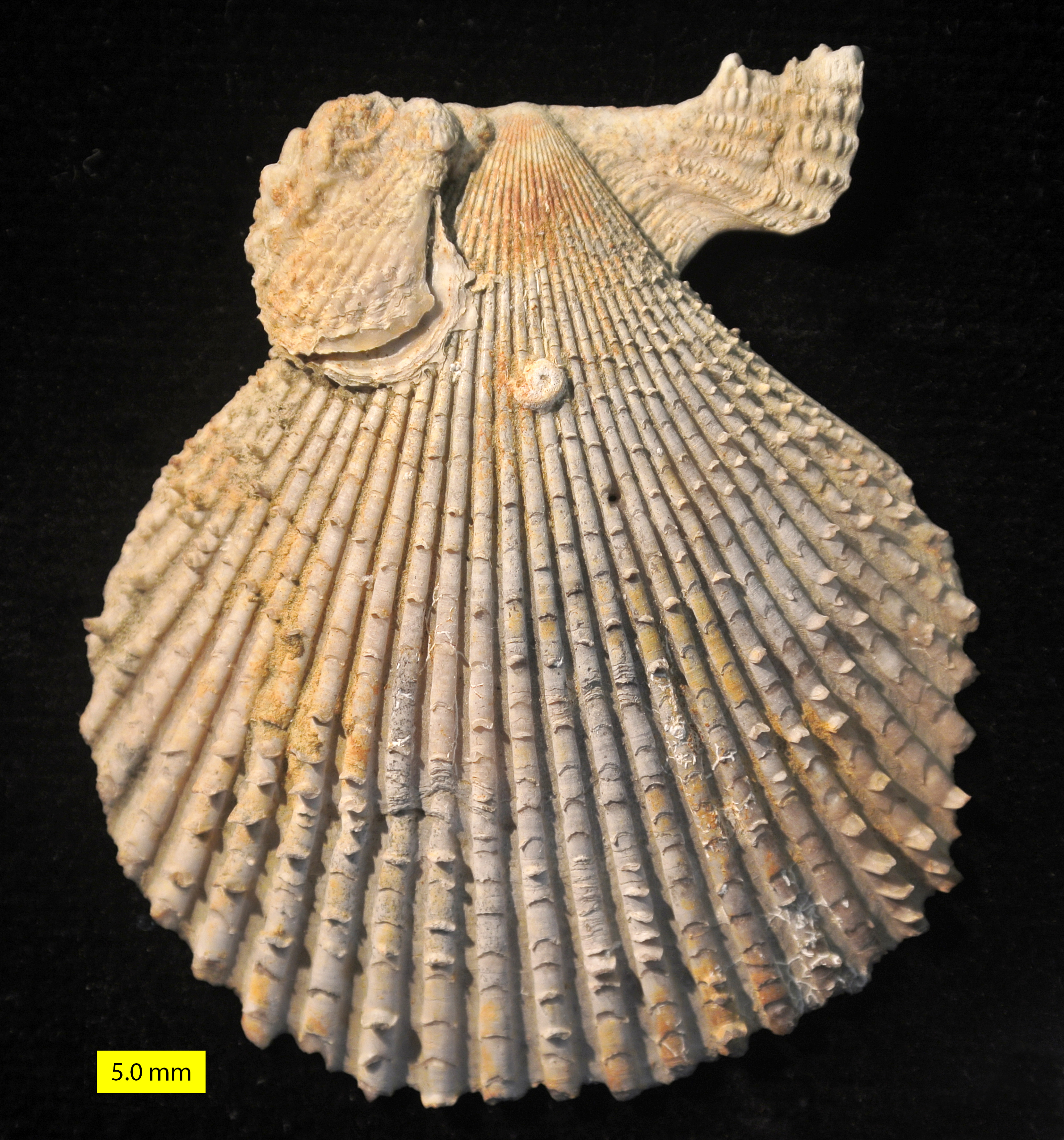
- Fossillized shell of a Chlamys bivalve
  Chlamys
- †Chondrocoenia
  - †Chondrocoenia idahoensis
  - †Chondrocoenia schafhaeutli
- †Cimolodon
  - †Cimolodon akersteni – type locality for species
- †Claraia
  - †Claraia extrema
  - †Claraia stachei
- †Clypites
  - †Clypites tenuis – type locality for species
- †Coelostylina
- †Coenastraea
  - †Coenastraea hyatti
- †Columbites – type locality for genus
  - †Columbites crassicostatus – type locality for species
  - †Columbites dolnapaensis – or unidentified related form
  - †Columbites isabellae – type locality for species
  - †Columbites parisianus – type locality for species
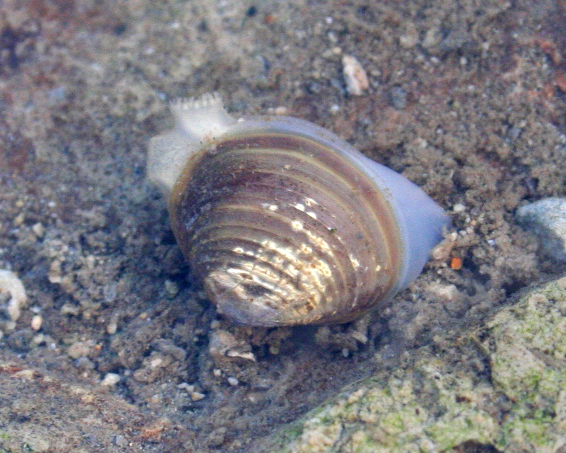
- A living Corbicula basket clam
  Corbicula
- †Cordillerites – type locality for genus
  - †Cordillerites angulatus – type locality for species
- †Coscaites
  - †Coscaites crassus – type locality for species
- Cossmannea
- †Cryptaulax
  - †Cryptaulax acutus – type locality for species
  - †Cryptaulax gruendeli – type locality for species
  - †Cryptaulax nezperceorum – type locality for species
  - †Cryptaulax rhabdocolpoides
  - †Cryptaulax wallowaensis – type locality for species
- †Cryptorhynchia
  - †Cryptorhynchia bearensis – type locality for species
- †Ctenostreon
  - †Ctenostreon gikshanensis – or unidentified comparable form
- †Cupressinoxylon
- †Cyathocoenia
  - †Cyathocoenia squiresi
- †Cycadeoidea
- †Cylindrobullina – tentative report
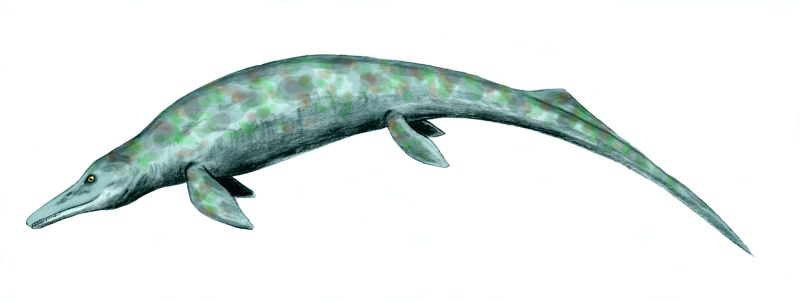
- Life restoration of the Middle-Late Triassic ichthyosaur Cymbospondylus
  †Cymbospondylus

== D ==
- †Dagnoceras
  - †Dagnoceras bonnevillense
  - †Dagnoceras pealei
  - †Dagnoceras zappanense – or unidentified related form
- †Dalmatites
  - †Dalmatites attenuatus
  - †Dalmatites richardsi
- †Dennstaedtia – tentative report
  - †Dennstaedtia fremonti
- †Deweveria
  - †Deweveria dudresnayi – type locality for species
- †Diatrypesis
  - †Diatrypesis newelli – type locality for species
- †Dicosmos
- †Dieneroceras
  - †Dieneroceras dieneri
- †Distichophyllia
  - †Distichophyllia norica

== E ==
- †Elysastraea
  - †Elysastraea profunda
  - †Elysastraea vancouverensis
- †Endostoma – tentative report
- †Enoploceras
  - †Enoploceras newelli – type locality for species
- †Entolioides
  - †Entolioides utahensis
- †Eocalliostoma
  - †Eocalliostoma idahoensis – type locality for species
  - †Eocalliostoma multicostata – type locality for species
- †Eschericeratites – type locality for genus
  - †Eschericeratites lytoceratoides – type locality for species
- †Euchrysalis – tentative report
- †Eucycloscala
  - †Eucycloscala binodosa – or unidentified related form
- †Euflemingites
  - †Euflemingites cirratus – type locality for species
- †Eumicrotis – report made of unidentified related form or using admittedly obsolete nomenclature
  - †Eumicrotis curta
- †Eumorphotis
  - †Eumorphotis multiformis

== F ==
- †Fengshanites
  - †Fengshanites americanus
- †Flemingites
  - †Flemingites aspenensis
  - †Flemingites bannockensis
  - †Flemingites cirratus

== G ==
- †Gablonzeria
  - †Gablonzeria major
  - †Gablonzeria profunda
- †Germanonautilus
  - †Germanonautilus montpelierensis – type locality for species
- †Gervillia – report made of unidentified related form or using admittedly obsolete nomenclature
- †Glabercolumbites – type locality for genus
  - †Glabercolumbites glaber – type locality for species
- Gleichenia
- †Gnomohalorites
  - †Gnomohalorites cordilleranus
- †Grammatodon
  - †Grammatodon haguei
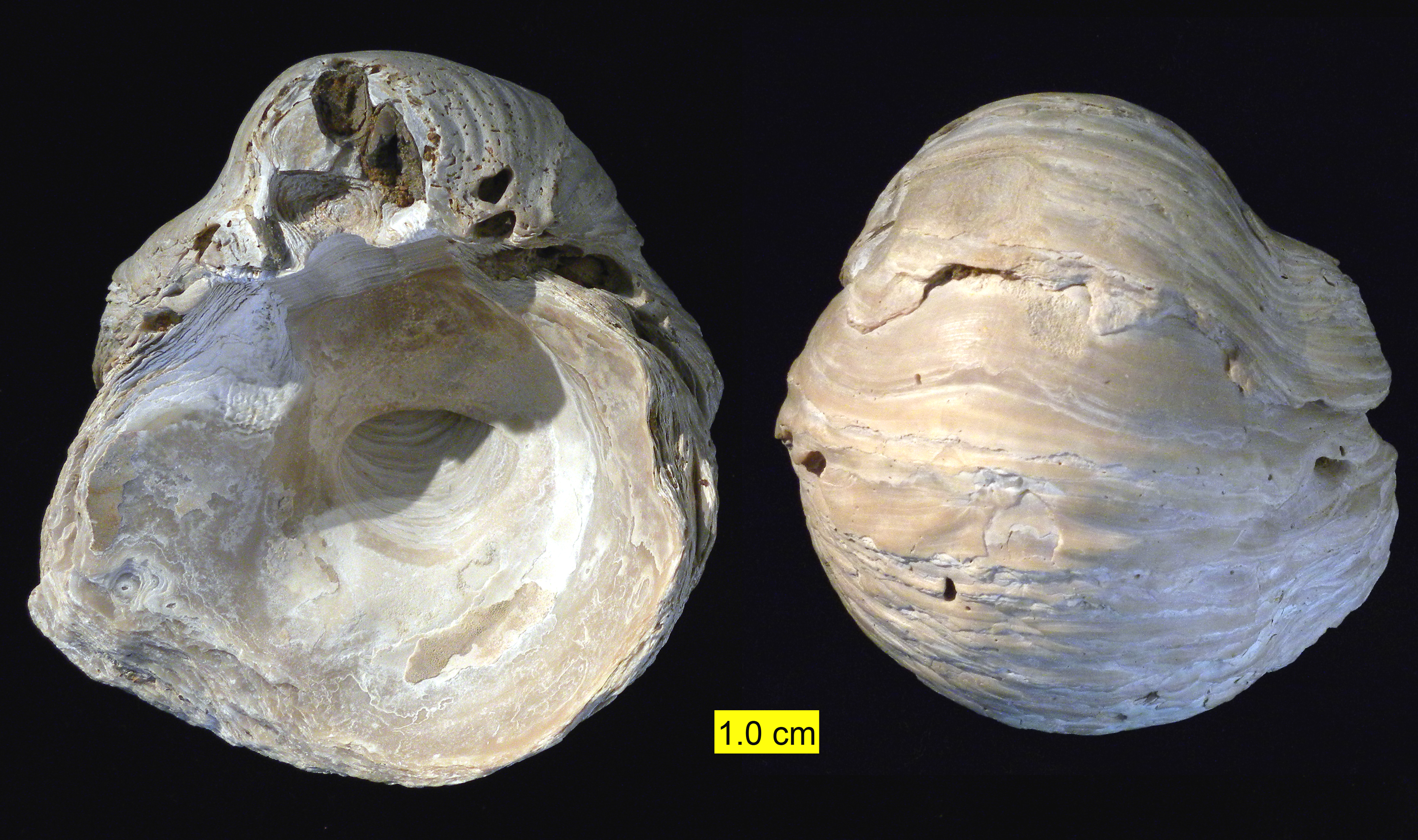
- Interior and exterior of a fossilized shell of the Late Triassic-Eocene marine bivalve Gryphaea
  †Gryphaea
  - †Gryphaea nebrascensis
  - †Gryphaea planoconvexa
- †Grypoceras
  - †Grypoceras milleri – type locality for species
- †Gudrunella – type locality for genus
  - †Gudrunella triassica – type locality for species

== H ==
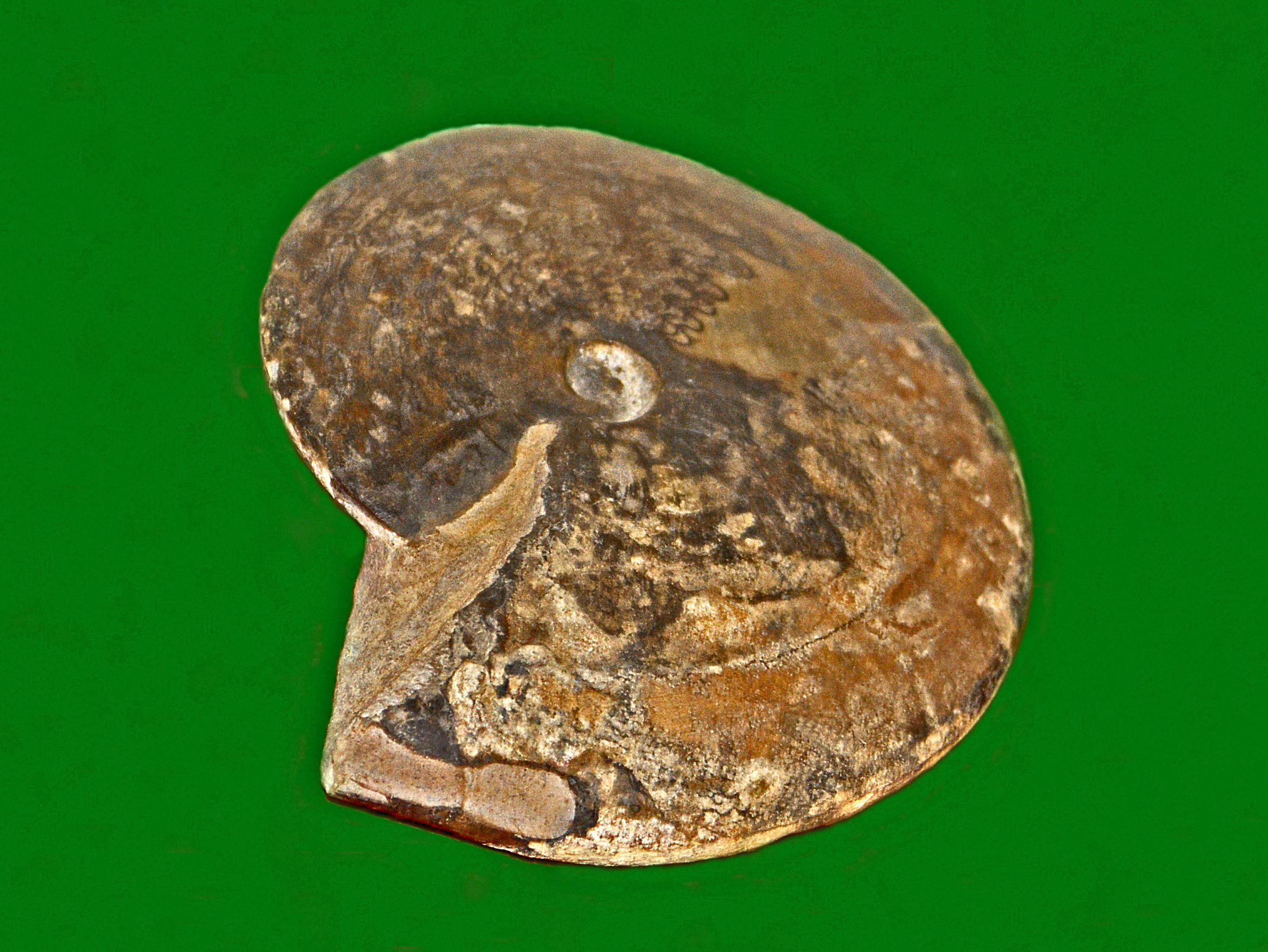
- Fossilized shell of the Triassic ammonoid cephalopod Hedenstroemia
  †Hedenstroemia
  - †Hedenstroemia kossmati
- †Hellenites
  - †Hellenites elegans – type locality for species
  - †Hellenites idahoense
- †Hemilecanites
  - †Hemilecanites paradiscus
- †Hemiprionites
  - †Hemiprionites typus
- †Heptastylis – tentative report
  - †Heptastylis alpina
  - †Heptastylis maculata
- †Holocrinus
  - †Holocrinus smithi

== I ==
- †Idahocolumbites
  - †Idahocolumbites cheneyi
- †Idahospira – type locality for genus
  - †Idahospira multispirata – type locality for species
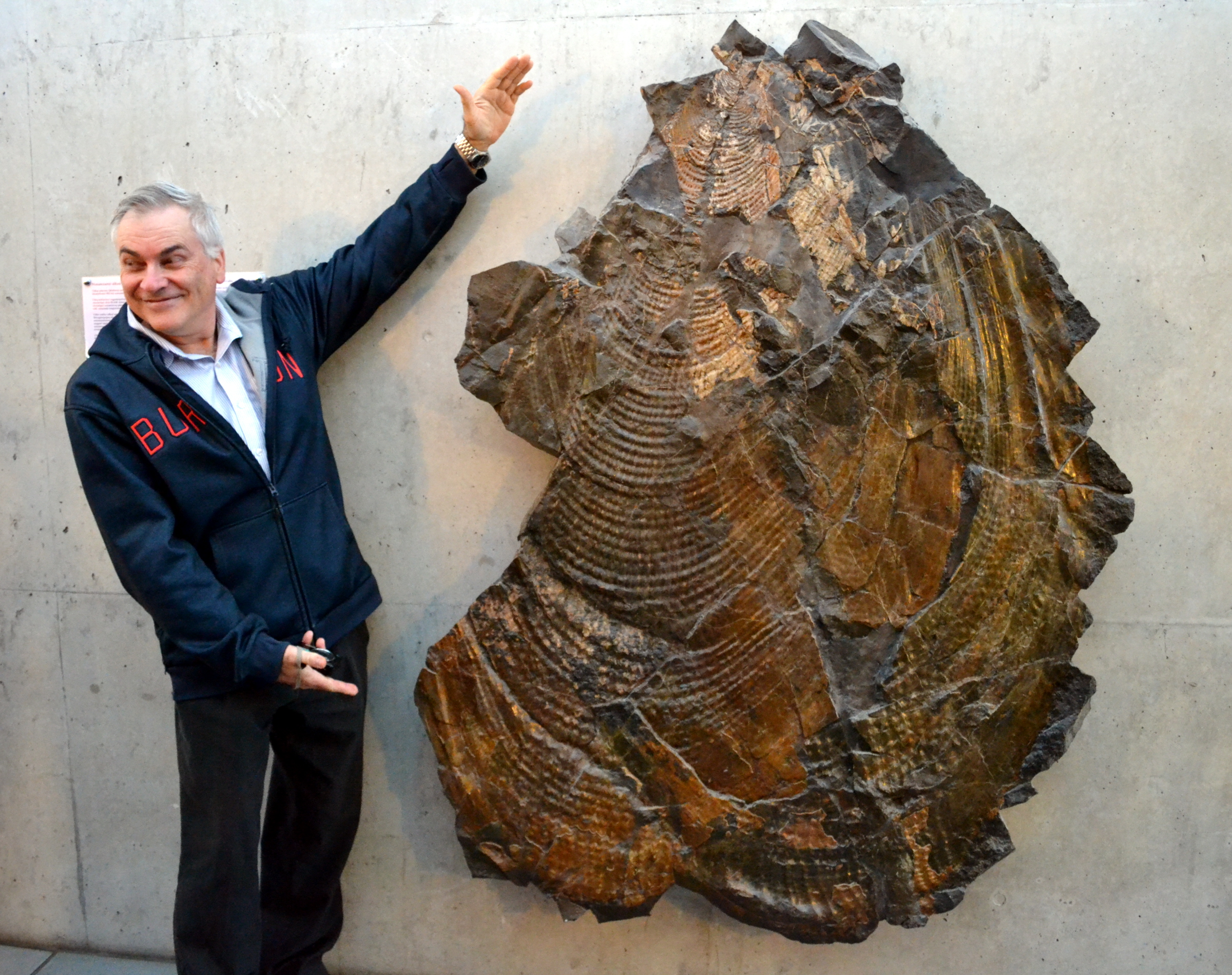
- Fossilized shell of the Early Jurassic-Late Cretaceous marine bivalve Inoceramus with a human indicating its size
  †Inoceramus
- †Inyoites
  - †Inyoites oweni
- †Isculitoides
  - †Isculitoides originis – or unidentified related form

== J ==
- †Jeanbesseiceras
  - †Jeanbesseiceras jacksoni – type locality for species
- †Jurassiphorus
  - †Jurassiphorus triadicus
- †Juvenites – type locality for genus
  - †Juvenites dieneri
  - †Juvenites kraffti – type locality for species
  - †Juvenites septentrionalis
  - †Juvenites thermarum

== K ==
- †Kazakhstanites
  - †Kazakhstanites dolnapensis
- †Kiparisovites
  - †Kiparisovites ovalis – or unidentified related form
- †Kittliconcha
  - †Kittliconcha obliquecostata

== L ==
- †Lamelliphorus
  - †Lamelliphorus acutelaminatus – type locality for species
- †Lanceolites
  - †Lanceolites compactus
- †Lecanites
  - †Lecanites arnoldi
- †Lepismatina
  - †Lepismatina mansfieldi – type locality for species
- †Leptochondria
  - †Leptochondria curtocardinalis
  - †Leptochondria occidanea
- †Levicidaris
- †Lingula
- †Lingularia
- †Liostrea
  - †Liostrea strigilecula
- †Litogaster
  - †Litogaster turnbullensis – type locality for species
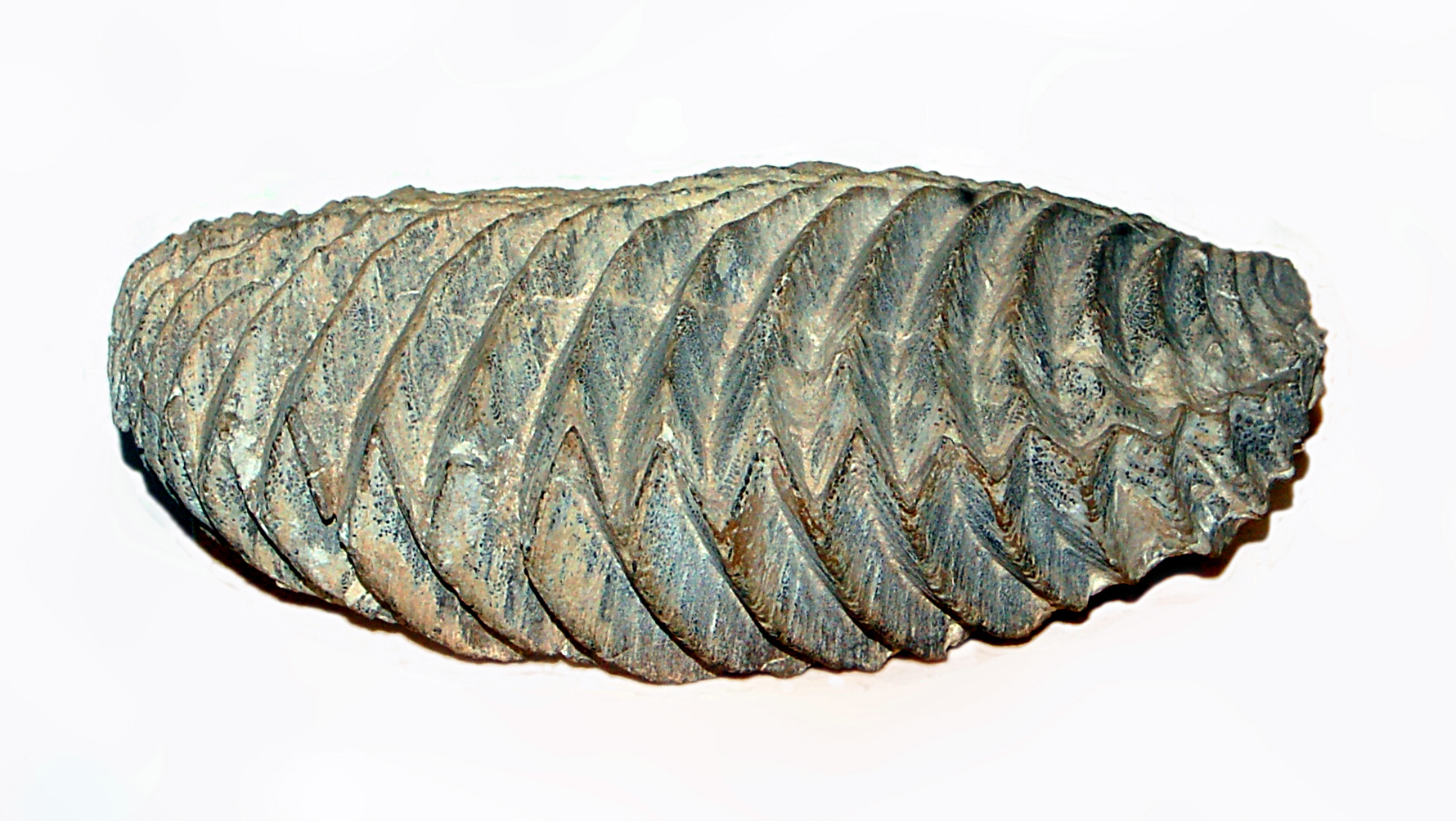
- Fossilized shell of the Triassic-modern marine bivalve Lopha
  Lopha
- †Loxopleurus
  - †Loxopleurus belliplicatus
- †Lyosoma
  - †Lyosoma powelli

== M ==
- †Marcouxia
  - †Marcouxia astakhovi
- †Maturifusus – tentative report
  - †Maturifusus siphonatus – type locality for species
- †Meekoceras
  - †Meekoceras cristatum
  - †Meekoceras gracilitatis – type locality for species
  - †Meekoceras haydeni
  - †Meekoceras micromphalus
  - †Meekoceras mushbachanum
  - †Meekoceras patelliforme
  - †Meekoceras sanctorum
- †Megasphaeroceras
  - †Megasphaeroceras rotundum – or unidentified related form
- †Metadagnoceras
  - †Metadagnoceras pulchrum – or unidentified related form
  - †Metadagnoceras unicum
- †Metussuria
  - †Metussuria waageni – type locality for species
- †Microtaenia
  - †Microtaenia variabilis
- †Miocidaris
- †Mojsvaroceras
  - †Mojsvaroceras frenchi – type locality for species
- †Myalina
  - †Myalina postcarbonica

== N ==
- †Naticopsis – tentative report
- †Nemacanthus
  - †Nemacanthus elegans – type locality for species
- †Neocolumbites
- †Neogondolella
  - †Neogondolella jubata
- †Neoschizodus
- †Neospathodus
  - †Neospathodus homeri – tentative report
  - †Neospathodus triangularis
- †Nerinea
- †Nodoconus – type locality for genus
  - †Nodoconus nodiferus – type locality for species
- †Nordophiceratoides
  - †Nordophiceratoides adriani – type locality for species
  - †Nordophiceratoides bartolinae – type locality for species
  - †Nordophiceratoides catherinae – type locality for species
  - †Nordophiceratoides gracilis – type locality for species
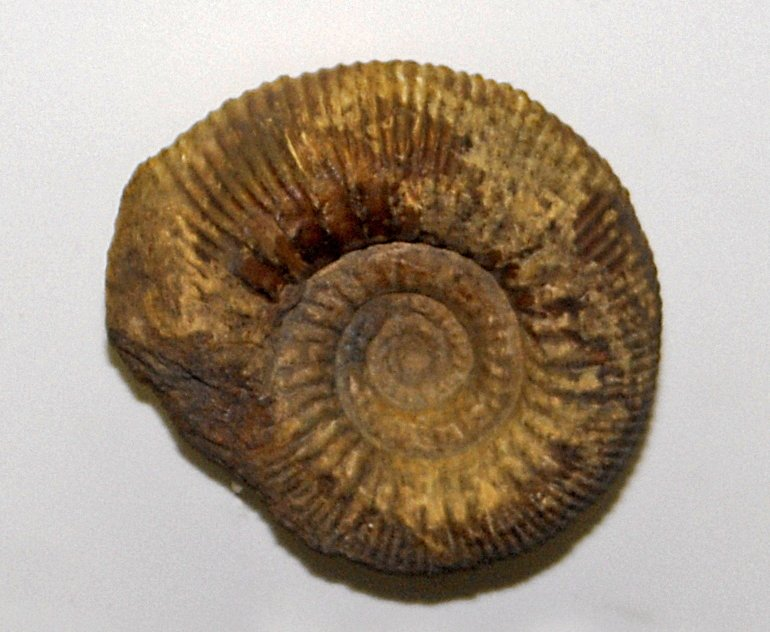
- Fossilized shell of the Middle Jurassic ammonoid cephalopod Normannites
  †Normannites
  - †Normannites crickmayi – or unidentified comparable form
- †Nuetzelopsis
  - †Nuetzelopsis tozeri

== O ==
- †Obnixia – type locality for genus
  - †Obnixia thaynesiana – type locality for species
- †Omphaloptycha
  - †Omphaloptycha jaworskii
- †Orthoceras
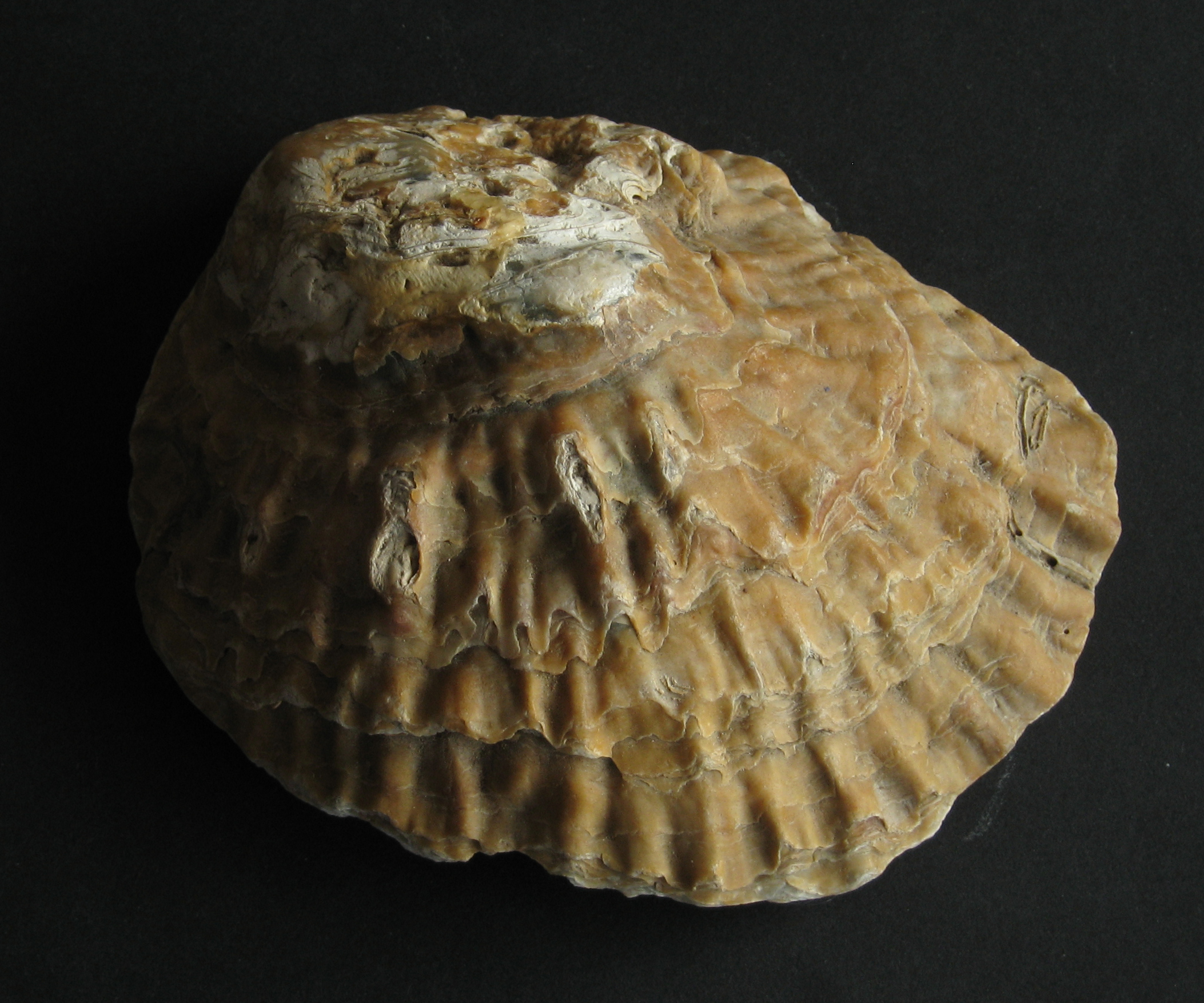
- Shell of an Ostrea, or oyster
  Ostrea
  - †Ostrea strigicula
- †Owenites
  - †Owenites koeneni – or unidentified comparable form

== P ==
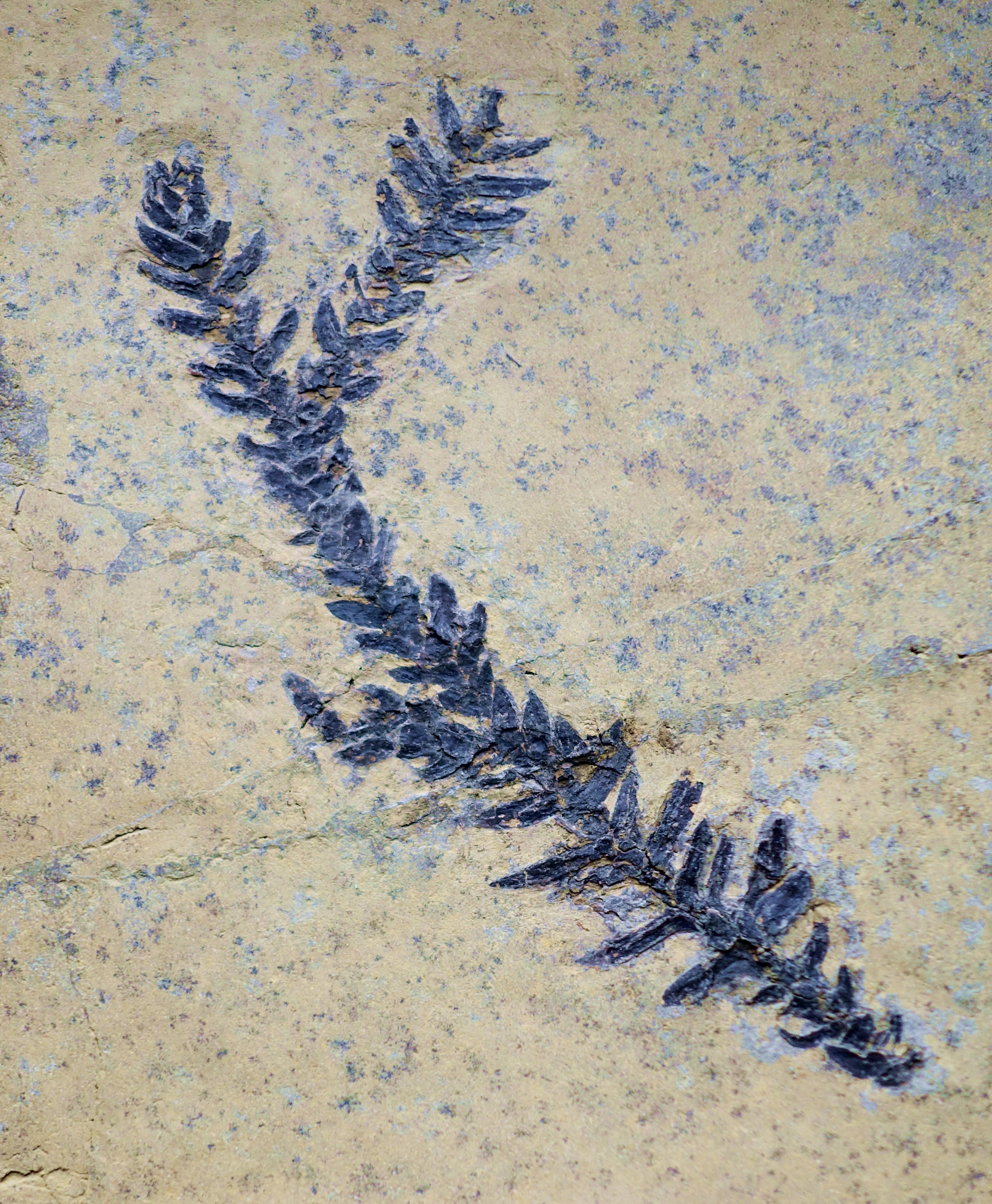
- Fossilized foliage of the Carboniferous-Late Cretaceous plant Pagiophyllum
  †Pagiophyllum
- †Palaeastraea
- †Palaeonarica
  - †Palaeonarica lapwaiensis – type locality for species
- †Palaeophyllites – tentative report
- †Pamiroseris
  - †Pamiroseris rectilamellosa
  - †Pamiroseris smithi
- †Paradelphinulopsis
  - †Paradelphinulopsis vallieri
- †Paragoceras
  - †Paragoceras malayanus – or unidentified comparable form
  - †Paragoceras timorensis – or unidentified related form
- †Paranannites – type locality for genus
  - †Paranannites aspenensis – type locality for species
- †Paraphyllanthoxylon
  - †Paraphyllanthoxylon idahoense
- †Paullia
- †Pentacrinus
  - †Pentacrinus asteriscus
- †Periallus – type locality for genus
  - †Periallus woodsidensis – type locality for species
- †Permophorus
  - †Permophorus bregeri
  - †Permophorus triassicus
- †Phacelophyllia – report made of unidentified related form or using admittedly obsolete nomenclature
  - †Phacelophyllia suttonensis
- †Phacelostylophyllum
  - †Phacelostylophyllum zitteli
- †Phaedrysmocheilus
  - †Phaedrysmocheilus idahoensis – type locality for species
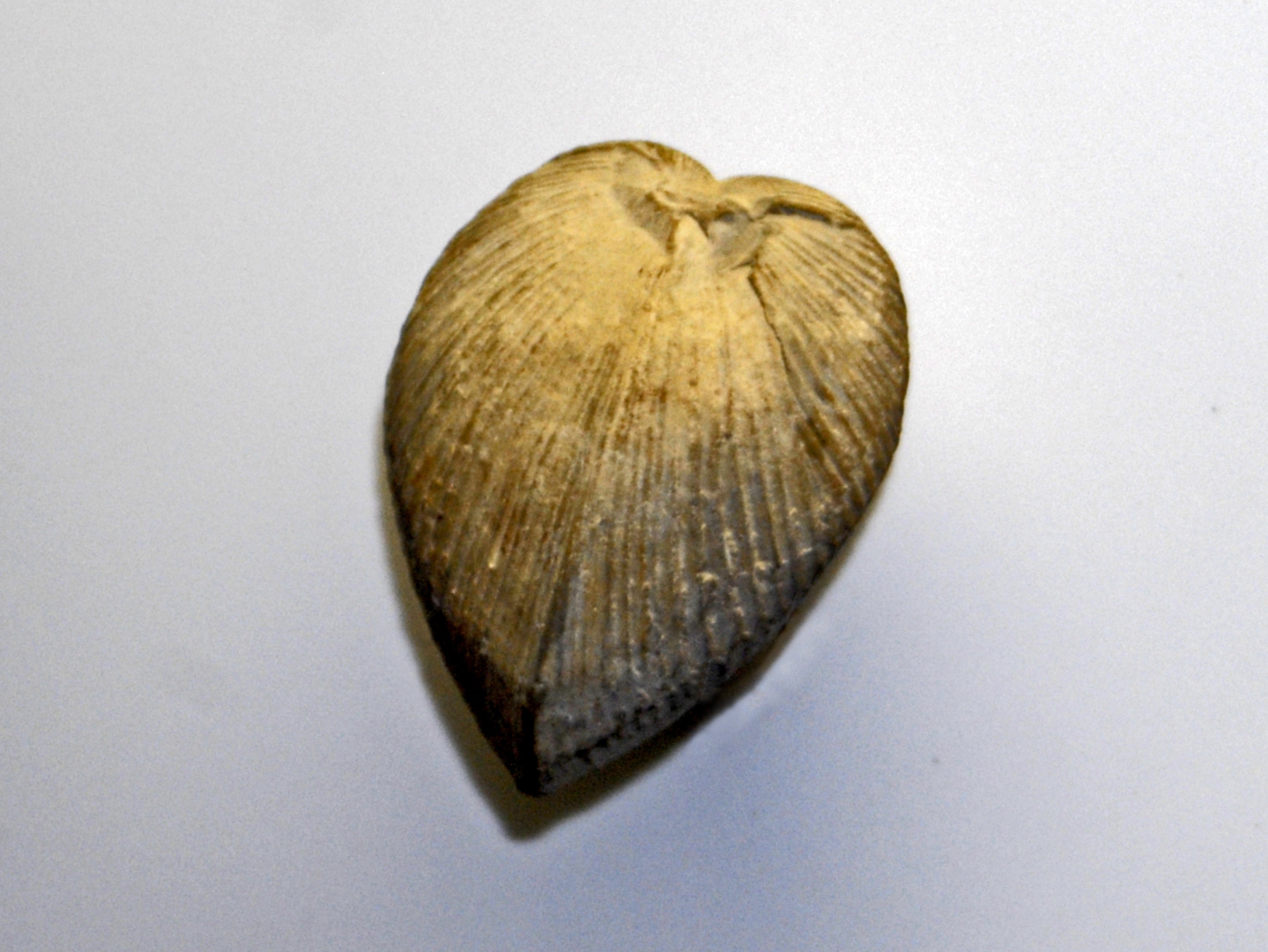
- Fossilized shell of the Early Triassic-Pliocene marine bivalve Pholadomya
  Pholadomya
  - †Pholadomya inaequiplicata
- †Piarorhynchella
  - †Piarorhynchella triassica
- †Plagiostoma
  - †Plagiostoma occidentalis
- †Platymya
  - †Platymya rockymontana
- †Platyvillosus
  - †Platyvillosus asperatus
- †Pleuromya
  - †Pleuromya subcompressa
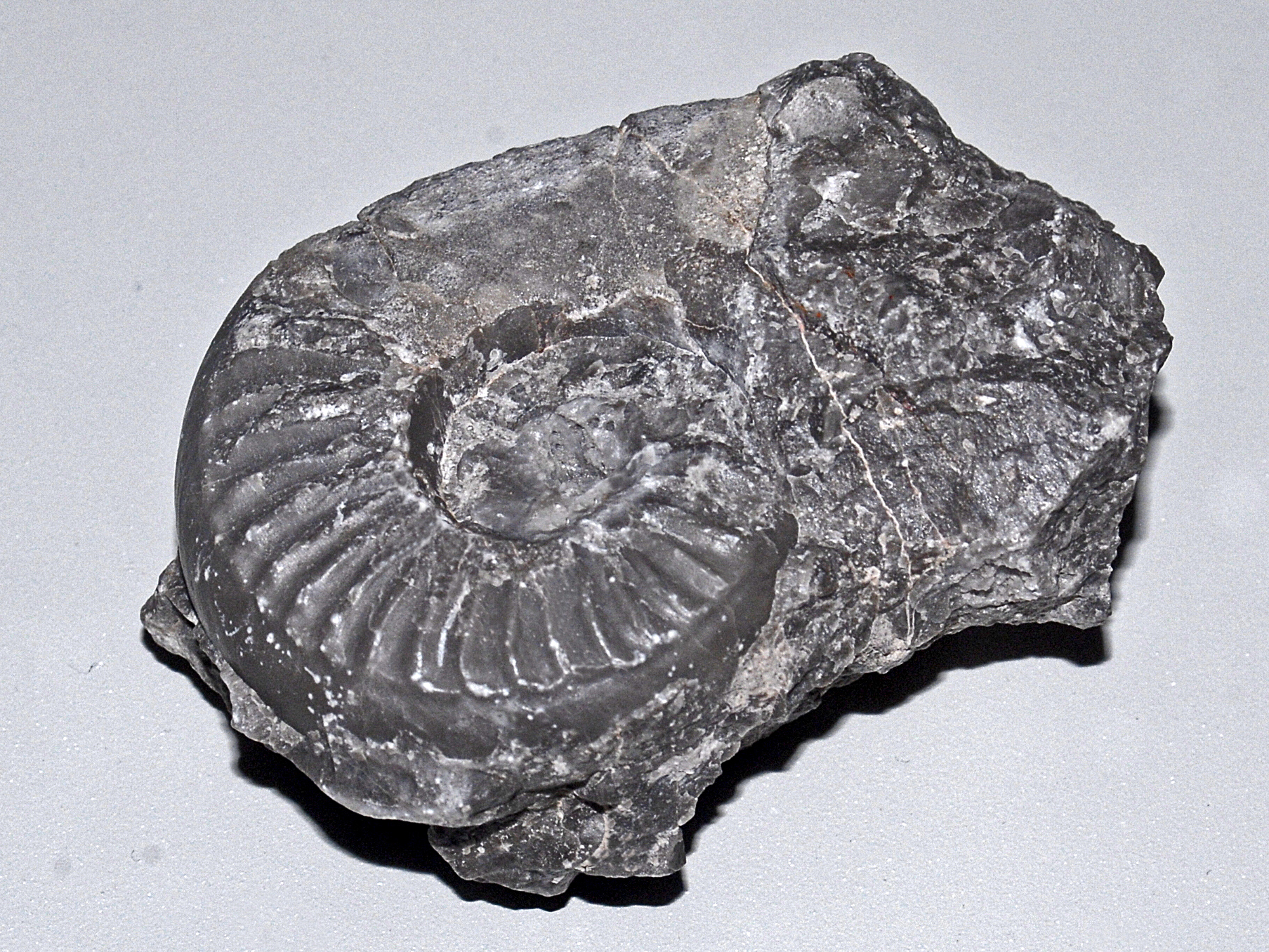
- Fossilized shell of the Carboniferous-Triassic nautiloid cephalopod Pleuronautilus
  †Pleuronautilus
- †Polygyrina – tentative report
  - †Polygyrina subannulata – type locality for species
- †Portneufia – type locality for genus
  - †Portneufia episulcata – type locality for species
- †Praelittorina
  - †Praelittorina sepkoskii – type locality for species
- †Praesibirites – tentative report
- †Precorynella
- †Preflorianites
  - †Preflorianites toulai
- †Procarnites
- †Procolumbites
  - †Procolumbites karataucicus
- †Prohungarites
  - †Prohungarites beyrichitoides – type locality for species
  - †Prohungarites gutstadti
  - †Prohungarites mckelvei
- †Promathildia – tentative report
  - †Promathildia multituberculata – type locality for species
- †Promyalina
  - †Promyalina putiatinensis
  - †Promyalina spathi
- †Pronoella
  - †Pronoella cinnabarensis
  - †Pronoella uintahensis
- †Protocardia
  - †Protocardia schucherti – or unidentified comparable form
- †Protodonax
- †Protogusarella – type locality for genus
  - †Protogusarella smithi – type locality for species
- †Protorcula – tentative report
  - †Protorcula concava – type locality for species
- †Pseudaspidites
  - †Pseudaspidites wheeleri
- †Pseudharpoceras
  - †Pseudharpoceras idahoense
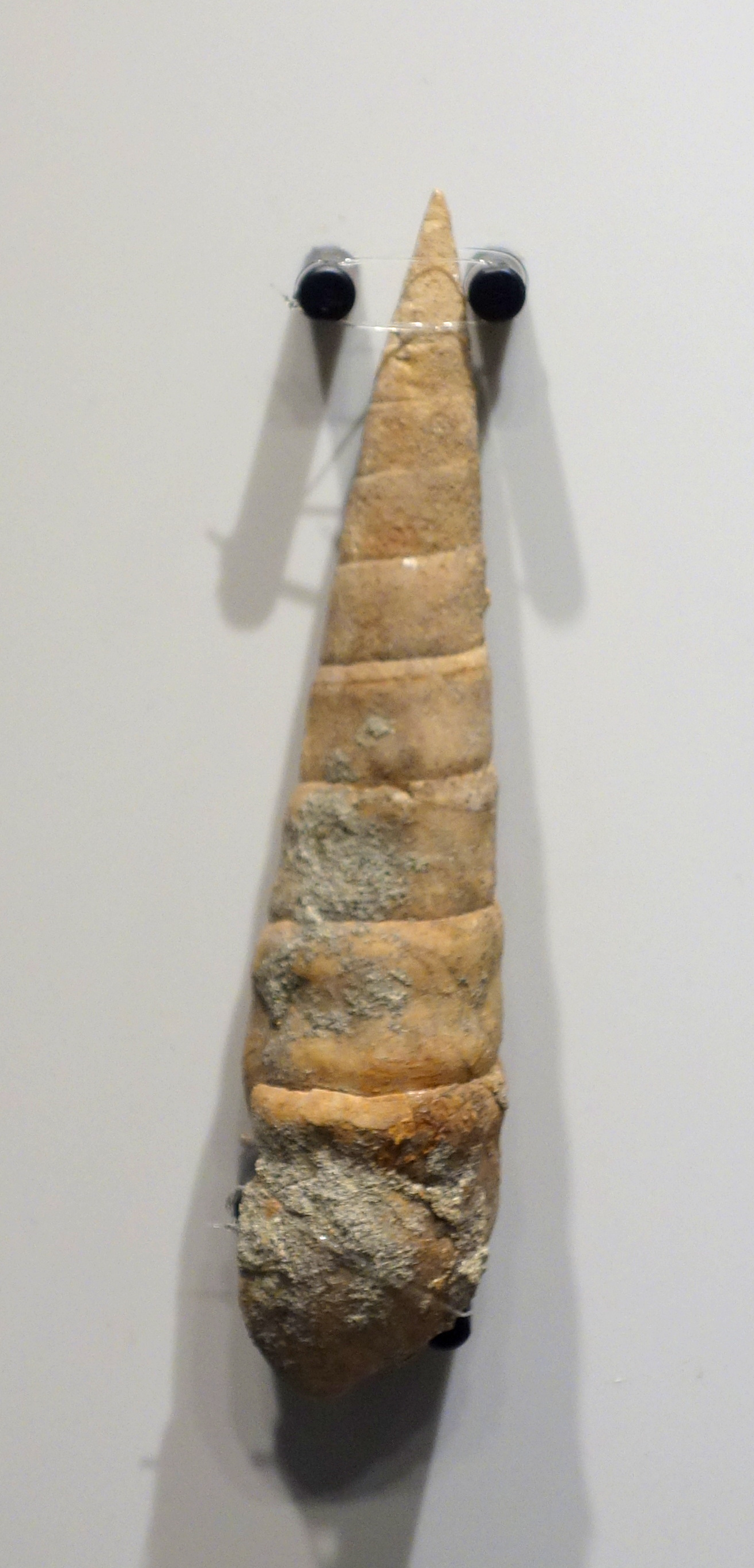
- Fossilized shell of a Pseudomelania sea snail
  †Pseudomelania – tentative report
- †Pseudomonotis
  - †Pseudomonotis idahoensis
  - †Pseudomonotis pealei
- †Pseudosageceras
  - †Pseudosageceras multilobatum – type locality for species
- †Pseudoscalites
  - †Pseudoscalites elegantissimus – or unidentified comparable form
- †Pteria – tentative report
  - †Pteria ussurica – or unidentified comparable form
- †Ptychomphalus – tentative report
  - †Ptychomphalus protei – or unidentified related form
- †Ptychostoma
  - †Ptychostoma ornata – type locality for species
- †Pyknotylacanthus – type locality for genus
  - †Pyknotylacanthus spathianus – type locality for species
- †Pyrgulifera
  - †Pyrgulifera humerosa

== Q ==
- †Quenstedtia
  - †Quenstedtia sublevis

== R ==
- †Retiophyllia
  - †Retiophyllia clathrata – or unidentified comparable form
  - †Retiophyllia dawsoni
  - †Retiophyllia parviseptum
- †Rhaetina
  - †Rhaetina incurvirostra – type locality for species
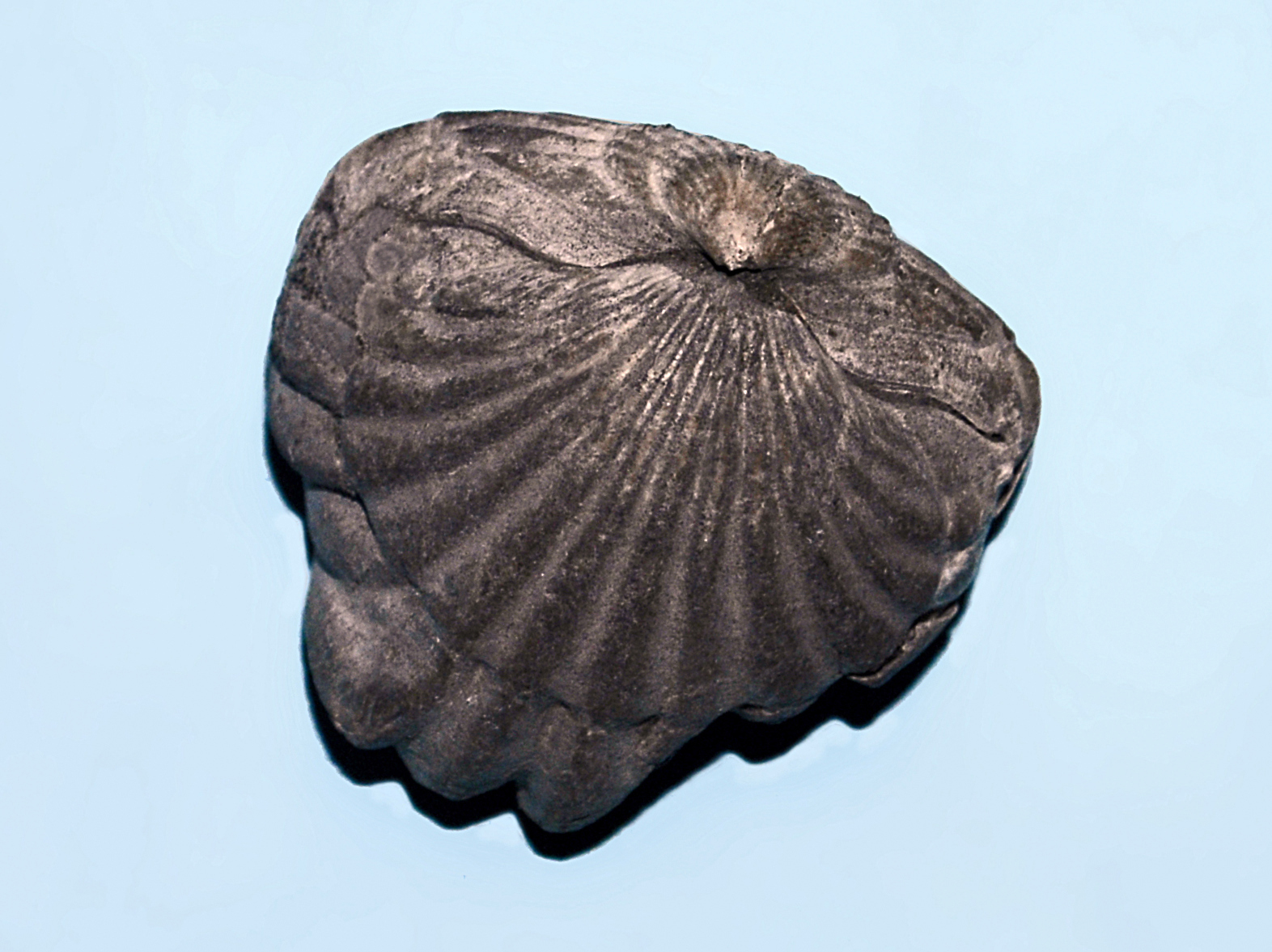
- Fossilized shell of the Silurian-Eocene articulate brachiopod Rhynchonella
  †Rhynchonella – report made of unidentified related form or using admittedly obsolete nomenclature
- †Rudolftruempyiceras
  - †Rudolftruempyiceras apostolicum
  - †Rudolftruempyiceras apostolicus

== S ==
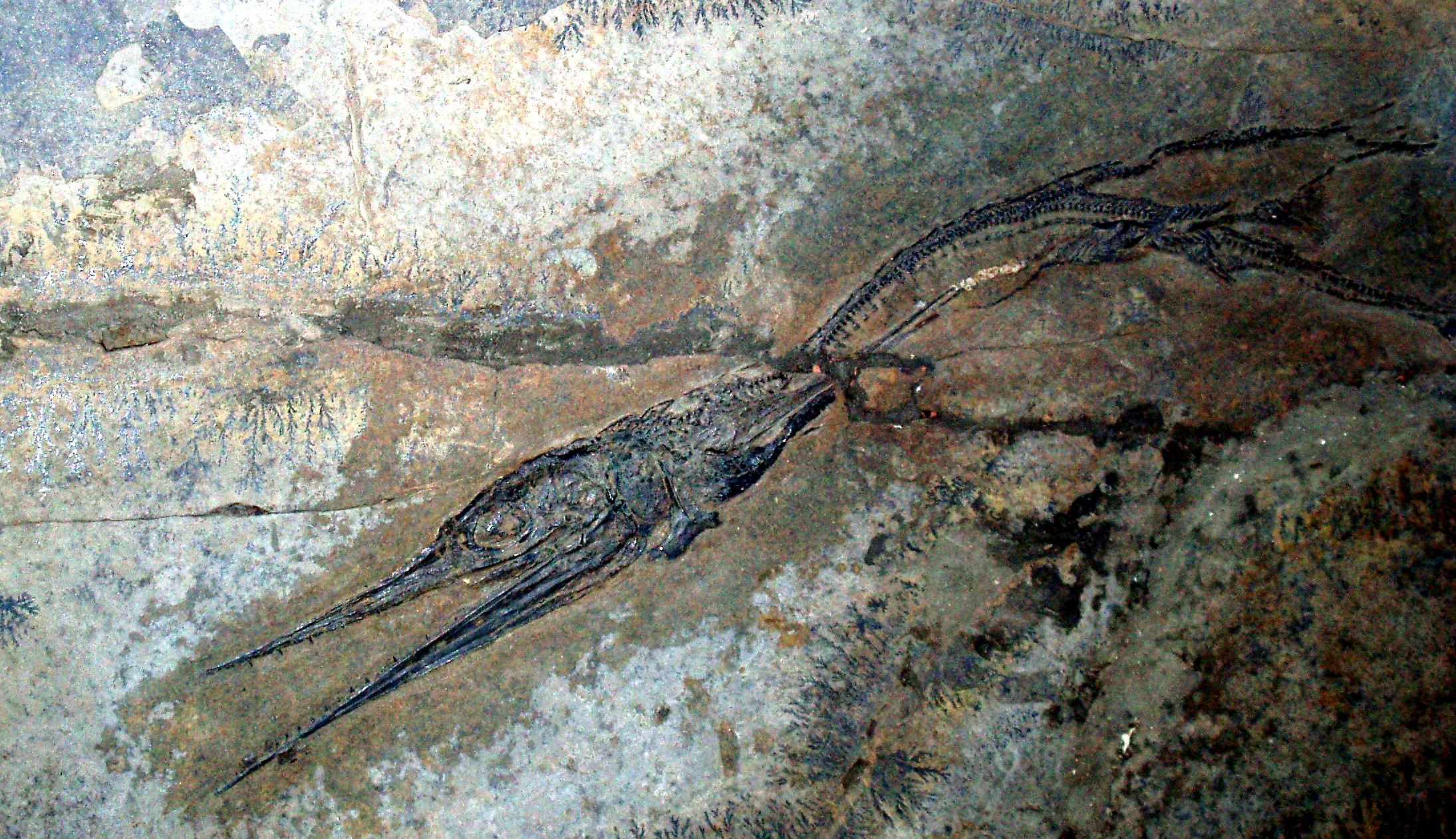
- Fossilized skeleton of the Early Triassic-Middle Jurassic bony fish Saurichthys
  †Saurichthys
  - †Saurichthys elongatus – or unidentified comparable form
- †Sibirites
  - †Sibirites carinatus – type locality for species
- †Silberlingeria
  - †Silberlingeria bearlakensis
  - †Silberlingeria coronata
  - †Silberlingeria sarahjanae – type locality for species
- †Siphonilda – type locality for genus
  - †Siphonilda pulchella – type locality for species
- †Sororcula
  - †Sororcula gracilis
- †Spiniomphalus – type locality for genus
  - †Spiniomphalus duplicatus – type locality for species
- †Spiriferina
  - †Spiriferina roundyi
- †Spirostylus
- †Spondylospira
  - †Spondylospira lewesensis
- †Stacheites
  - †Stacheites concavus
  - †Stacheites floweri
  - †Stacheites prionoides – or unidentified related form
- †Stemmatoceras
  - †Stemmatoceras albertense – or unidentified related form
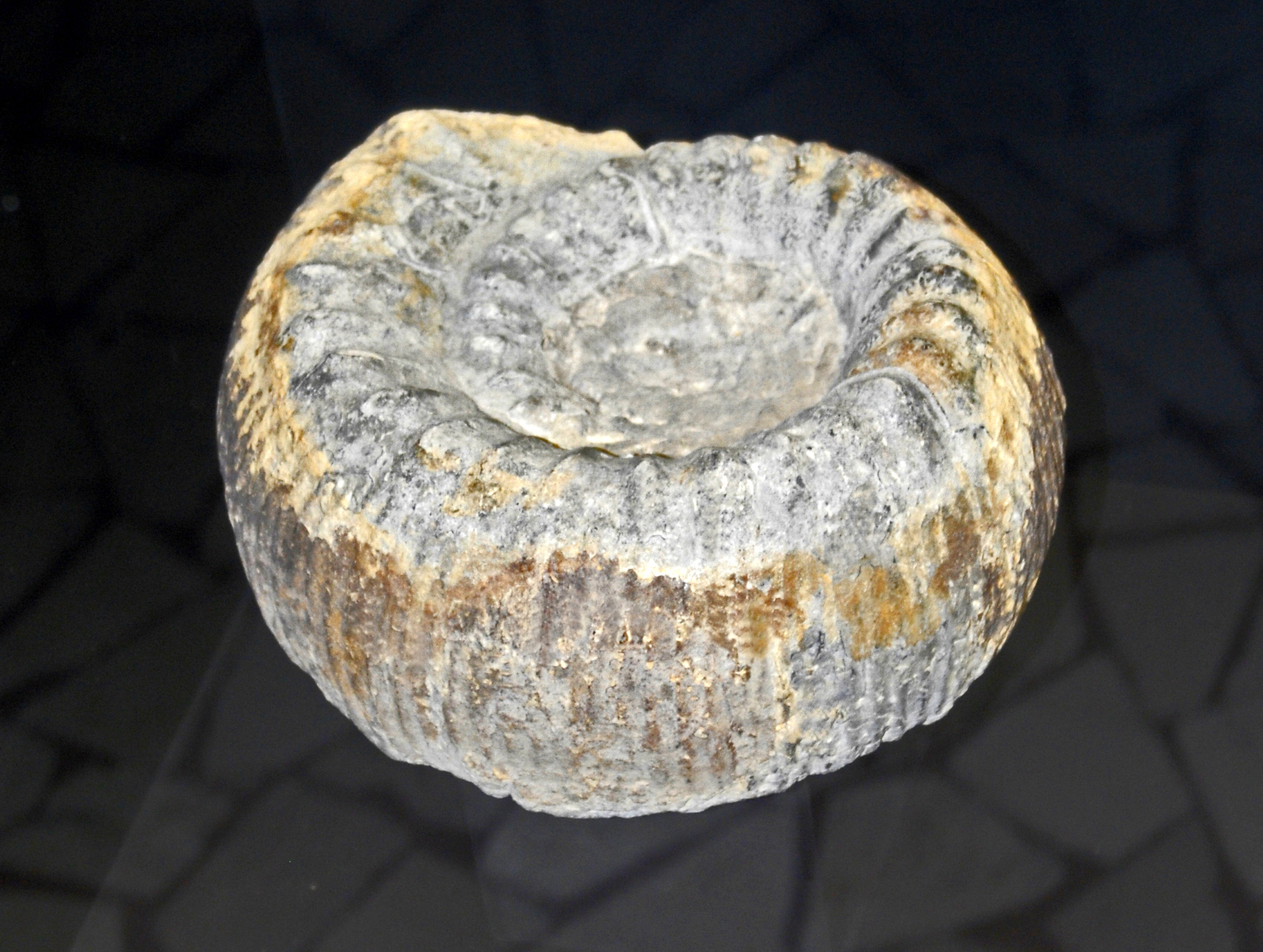
- Fossilized shell of the Middle Jurassic ammonoid cephalopod Stephanoceras
  †Stephanoceras
  - †Stephanoceras skidegatensis – or unidentified comparable form
- †Stylophyllum
  - †Stylophyllum paradoxum
- †Subcolumbites
  - †Subcolumbites perrinismithi – or unidentified related form
- †Subhungarites
  - †Subhungarites yatesi
- †Submeekoceras
  - †Submeekoceras mushbachanum – type locality for species
- †Svalbardiceras
  - †Svalbardiceras freboldi – or unidentified comparable form
  - †Svalbardiceras spitzbergensis – or unidentified related form
  - †Svalbardiceras sulcatum – type locality for species

== T ==
- †Tancredia – tentative report
- †Tapponnierites – type locality for genus
  - †Tapponnierites tenuicostatus – type locality for species
- †Tardicolumbites – type locality for genus
  - †Tardicolumbites tardicolumbus – type locality for species
- †Teinostomopsis – tentative report
- †Tempskya
  - †Tempskya wesselii
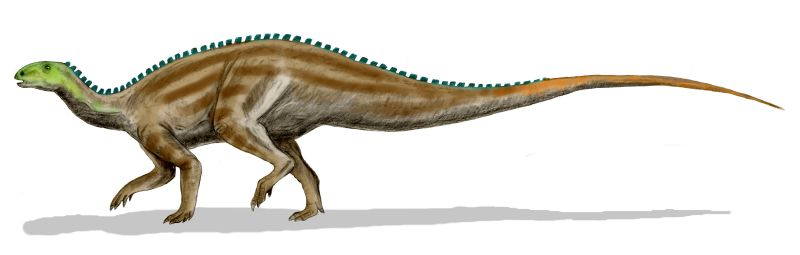
- Life restoration of the Early Cretaceous Iguanodon relative Tenontosaurus
  †Tenontosaurus
- †Teretrina
  - †Teretrina aculeata
  - †Teretrina canaliculata – type locality for species
  - †Teretrina schulberti – type locality for species
- †Thamnasteria
  - †Thamnasteria smithi
- †Thaumastocoelia
- †Thecomeandra
  - †Thecomeandra vallieri – type locality for species
- †Tirolites
  - †Tirolites harti
  - †Tirolites knighti
  - †Tirolites pealei
  - †Tirolites smithi – type locality for species
- †Tretospira
- †Triadocidaris
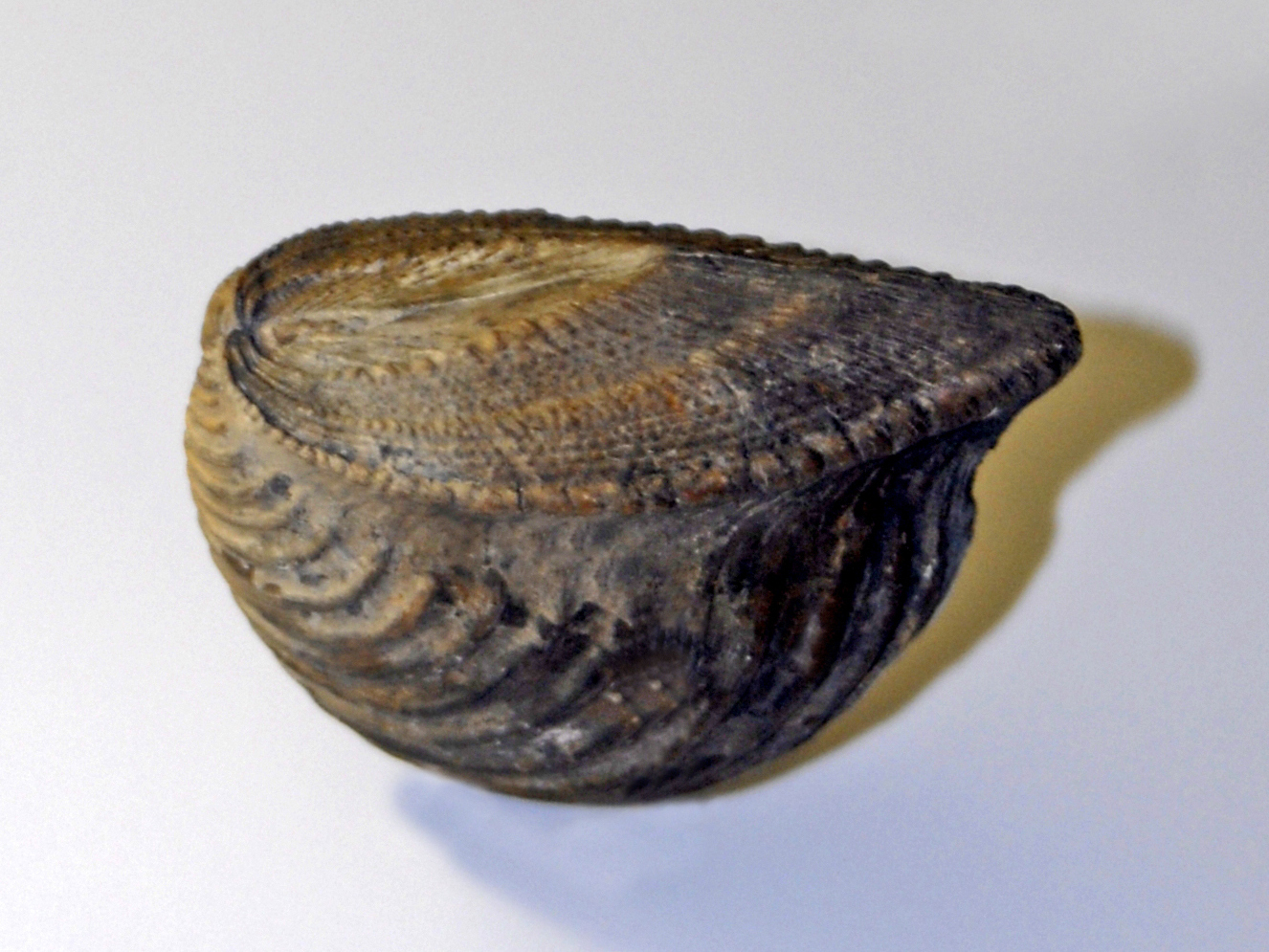
- Fossilized shell of the Permian-Paleocene marine bivalve Trigonia
  †Trigonia
  - †Trigonia montanaensis
- †Tyrsoecus – tentative report

== U ==
- †Ueckerconulus
  - †Ueckerconulus noricus – type locality for species
- †Undularia
  - †Undularia americana – type locality for species
- †Unionites
- †Ussuria
  - †Ussuria occidentalis
- †Ussurites
  - †Ussurites mansfeldi
  - †Ussurites mansfieldi
  - †Ussurites submansfeldi – type locality for species

== V ==
- †Vex – type locality for genus
  - †Vex semisimplex – type locality for species
- †Vitimetula – type locality for genus
  - †Vitimetula parva – type locality for species

== W ==
- †Weitschatopsis
  - †Weitschatopsis pulchra
- †Worthenia
  - †Worthenia rhombifera – or unidentified comparable form
- †Wyomingites – type locality for genus
  - †Wyomingites aplanatus – type locality for species
  - †Wyomingites arnoldi – type locality for species

== X ==
- †Xenoceltites
  - †Xenoceltites cordilleranus
  - †Xenoceltites crenulatus – type locality for species
  - †Xenoceltites spencei
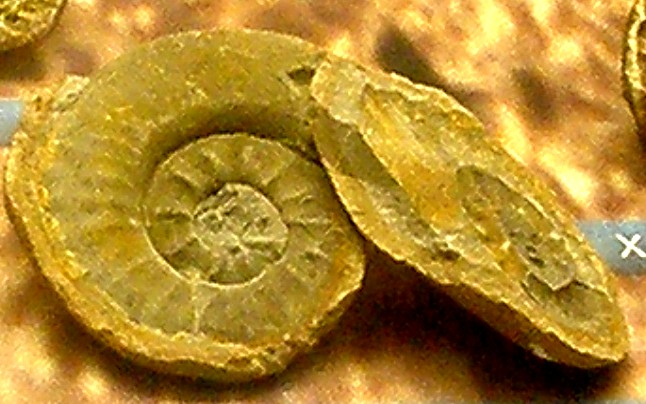
- Fossilized shells of the ammonoid cephalopod Xenodiscus
  †Xenodiscus
  - †Xenodiscus gilberti
  - †Xenodiscus tarpeyi
  - †Xenodiscus waageni
  - †Xenodiscus whiteanus

== Y ==
- †Yunnania – tentative report
  - †Yunnania subcincta
- †Yvesgalleticeras
  - †Yvesgalleticeras montpelierense
  - †Yvesgalleticeras raphaeli – type locality for species

== Z ==
- †Zardinechinus
- †Zygopleura
