= Xiphogymnites =

Xiphogymnites Temporal range: Triassic

Scientific classification
- Domain: Eukaryota
- Kingdom: Animalia
- Phylum: Mollusca
- Class: Cephalopoda
- Subclass: †Ammonoidea
- Order: †Ceratitida
- Family: †Gymnitidae
- Genus: †Xiphogymnites; Spath, 1951

Extinct genus of molluscs

Xiphogymnites is an extinct ammonoid cephalopod genus from the Triassic included in the family Gymnitidae. It is known from the Balkans in eastern Europe.

The shell is similar to that of Gymnites, smooth, evolute, whorl section oval, venter arched, suture ammonitic, except that it has a row of tubercles on the venter followed by constrictions. Both genera are included in the Pinacoceratoidea.
