= Arctoptychites =

Arctoptychites Temporal range: Triassic

Scientific classification
- Kingdom: Animalia
- Phylum: Mollusca
- Class: Cephalopoda
- Subclass: †Ammonoidea
- Order: †Ceratitida
- Family: †Ptychitidae
- Genus: †Arctoptychites; Archipov et al. 1974

Genus of molluscs (fossil)

Arctoptychites is a genus of extinct cephalopods belonging to the ceratitid family Ptychitidae, and related to such genera as Ptychites and Aristoptychites; all from the Triassic.

The Ptychitidae, to which Arctoptychites belongs, is a family of ceratitid ammonites (sensu lato) with ammonitic sutures and variably subglobular to compressed, ribbed or smooth, generally evolute shells.
