= Sturia =

Sturia Temporal range: Early Triassic

Scientific classification
- Kingdom: Animalia
- Phylum: Mollusca
- Class: Cephalopoda
- Subclass: †Ammonoidea
- Order: †Ceratitida
- Family: †Sturiidae
- Genus: †Sturia; Mojsisovics, 1882

Genus of molluscs (fossil)

Sturia is a genus of ceratitid ammonoids from the Lower Triassic with an ammonitic suture.

Sturia produced a robust, laterally compressed, high whorled, involute shell; whorls strongly embracing. the surface is without ribs or constructions but does have sharp spiral lines. the suture is ammonitic, deeply digitate; lobes and saddles narrowly V-shaped overall. The ventral lobe is divided, 1st lateral lobe is larger than the second, which is followed by a series of auxiliary lobes decreasing in size toward the umbilicus.

J.P Smith, 1932, included Sturia in the Thalassoceratidae, but only tentatively. The American Treatise on Invertebrate Paleontology, Part L, 1957, includes Sturia in the Ptychitidae, along with such genera as Ptychites, Discoptychites, Aristoptychites, and Parasturia. Sturia is now included in the Sturiidae, established by Kipsarova. 1958, for genera such as already mentioned Sturia, Parasturia, and Discoptychites, notably distinct from genera retained in the Ptychitidae, like Ptychites.
