= Ophioceratidae =

Scientific classification
- Kingdom: Animalia
- Phylum: Mollusca
- Class: Cephalopoda
- Subclass: †Ammonoidea
- Order: †Ceratitida
- Superfamily: †Noritoidea
- Family: †Ophioceratidae; Arthaber

Genera
- Discophiceras; Nordophiceras; Ophiceras; Sakhaites; Vishnuites; Wordieoceras

Extinct family of molluscs

Ophioceratidae is an extinct family of cephalopods belonging to the Ammonite order Ceratitida and superfamily Noritoidea.
