= Clypeoceras =

Clypeoceras Temporal range: Early Triassic, (Scythian)

Scientific classification
- Kingdom: Animalia
- Phylum: Mollusca
- Class: Cephalopoda
- Subclass: †Ammonoidea
- Order: †Ceratitida
- Family: †Meekoceratidae
- Genus: †Clypeoceras; J.P Smith, 1913

Genus of molluscs (fossil)

Clypeoceras is a genus of ammonites with an involute discoidal shell from the Lower Triassic.

== Description ==
The shell of Clypeoceras is laterally compressed, involute, discoidal; whorls strongly embracing and deeply indented by the next inner whorl, increasing rapidly in height. Sides slightly convex, sloping outward to a rather narrow venter, which may be angular or rounded but never with keels or grooves. Surface smooth or ornamented with radial striae and folds. Body chamber short.

Suture ceratitic with deep asymmetric saddles and broad serrated lobes. Sutures have a Meekoceras stage produced during early growth with broad asymmetric saddles and narrower serrated lobes, indicating a phylogenetic relationship.

== Taxonomy ==
J.P Smith (1932) placed Clypeoceas in the Meekoceratidae, indicated by the similarity of the shell with Meekoceras and the development of the suture, produced by septa, during growth. Smith (1932) however included the Meekoceratidae in the Prolecanitoidea whereas it is considered part of the Noritaceae in the Treatise, which includes Clypeoceras in the Paranoritidae instead.
