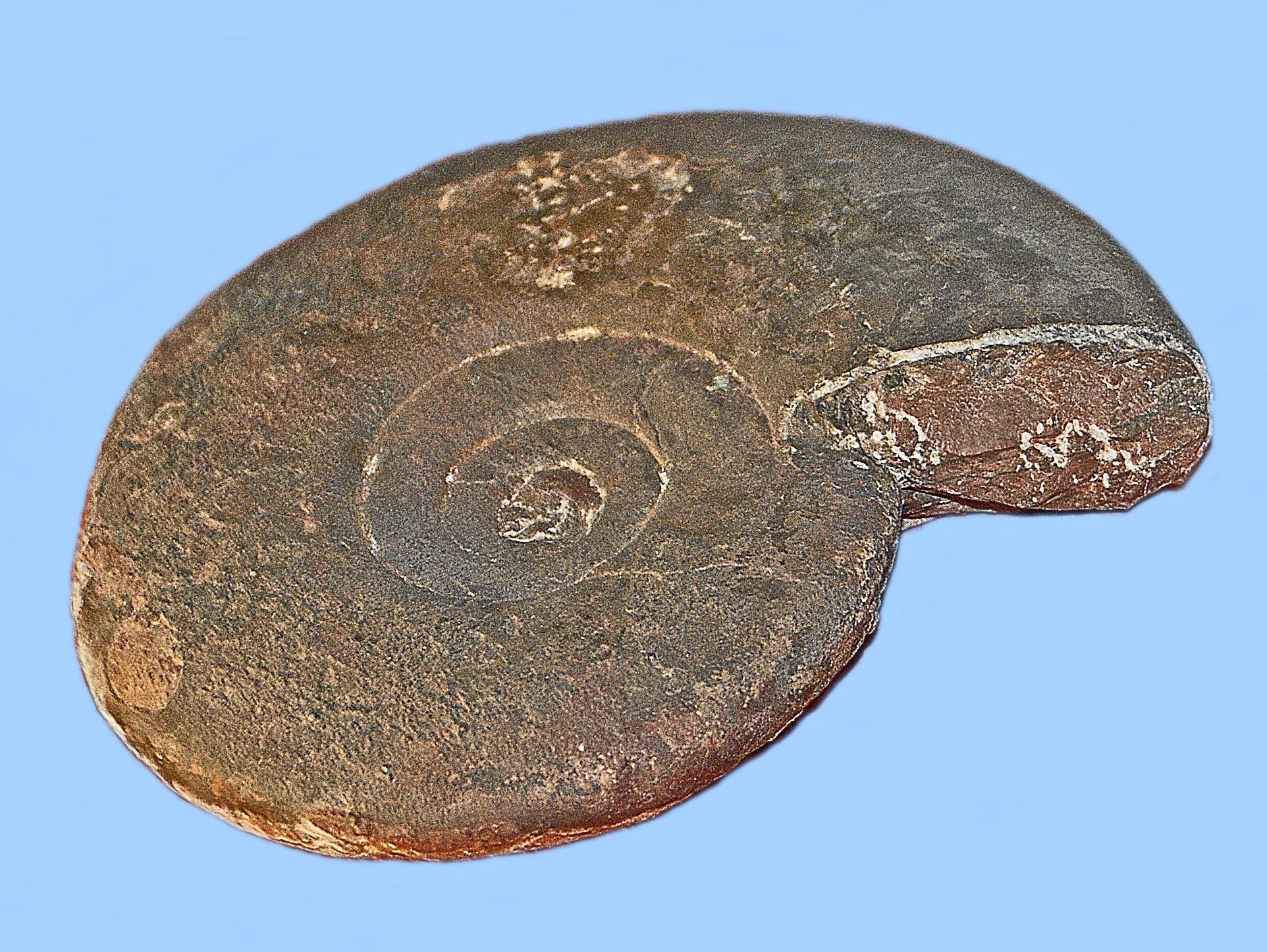
- Gymnites incultus from Bosnia, on display at Galerie de paléontologie et d'anatomie comparée in Paris

Scientific classification
- Kingdom: Animalia
- Phylum: Mollusca
- Class: Cephalopoda
- Subclass: †Ammonoidea
- Order: †Ceratitida
- Family: †Gymnitidae
- Genus: †Gymnites; Mojsisovics, 1882

= Gymnites =

Gymnites Temporal range: Triassic, 247.2–235.0 Ma

Extinct genus of molluscs

Gymnites is a genus of ammonoid cephalopod from the Middle Triassic belonging to the ceratitid family Gymnitidae. These nektonic carnivores lived during the Triassic period, the Anisian age.

== Species ==
- Gymnites aghdarbandensis Krystyn and Tatzreiter 1991
- Gymnites asseretoi Tozer 1972
- Gymnites billingsi Bucher 1989
- Gymnites calli Smith 1914
- Gymnites compressus Tozer 1994
- Gymnites evolutus Shevyrev 1995
- Gymnites humboldti Mojsisovics 1882
- Gymnites incultus Beyrich 1867
- Gymnites machangpingensis Zhao and Wang 1974
- Gymnites perplanus Meek 1877
- Gymnites petilus Wang and Chen 1979
- Gymnites procerus Tozer 1994
- Gymnites robinsoni Shevyrev 1995
- Gymnites toulai Arthaber 1914
- Gymnites tozeri Bucher 1992
- Gymnites tregorum Silberling and Nichols 1982
- Gymnites vastesellatus Welter 1915

== Description ==
The shell of Gymnites is evolute, generally smooth, with a wide umbilicus. Whorls are moderately embracing, whorl section oval and somewhat compressed. The outer whorl may be costate have rows of nodes, or both. The suture is ammonitic with a wide bifurcated ventral lobe and two lateral lobes on either side.

== Taxonomic relation ==
Hyatt and Smith (1905, p. 115)included Gymnites in the Gymnitidae along with Ophiceras, Flemingites, and Xenaspis, genera since assigned elsewhere, and included the Gymnitidae in the suborder Ceratitoidea (now the superfamily Ceratitaceae). Smith (1932, p. 30) shows Gymenites derived from Xenaspis and giving rise to the Pinacoceratidae.

The American Treatise (Part L, 1957) also includes Gymnites in the Gymnitidae, along with mainly descendant forms such as Buddhaites, Japonites, and variations on Gymnites itself, but instead included the Gymnitidae in the Pinacocerataceae which is consistent with Smith's derivation of the Pinacoceratidae from Gymnites.

== Distribution ==
Fossils of species within this genus have been found in the Triassic of Afghanistan, Canada, China, Hungary, Iran, Russia, Switzerland, Turkey, United States.
