= Ussuria =

Ussuria Temporal range: early Triassic

Scientific classification
- Kingdom: Animalia
- Phylum: Mollusca
- Class: Cephalopoda
- Subclass: †Ammonoidea
- Order: †Ceratitida
- Family: †Ussuriidae
- Genus: †Ussuria; Diener, 1895

Genus of molluscs (fossil)

Ussuria is a genus of Lower Triassic ammonites with a smooth, involute discoidal shell with submonophyllic sutures, belonging to the ceratitid family Ussuriidae.

Ussuria has been found in Russia in Siberia (original discovery), China, Oman, and Idaho in the United States.

== Description ==
The shell of Ussuria is laterally compressed and involute. Whorls are deeply embracing, increasing rapidly in height. Umbilicus is narrow and deep with rounded shoulders. Sides gently convex, converging on a narrow-rounded venter.

Sutures are ammonitic, with digitate lobes and submonophyllic saddles. The external, (or ventral), lobe is divided by a broad digitate siphonal saddle with each side of the lobe deeply trifid. The two or three principal lateral lobes on either side that are wide and deeply digitate, followed dorsally by another three or more smaller, also digitate, auxiliary lobes. The first lateral saddle is typically indented only on the ventral (rim) side and the second lateral saddle only of the dorsal side.

Ussuria somewhat resembles Sturia, commonly placed in the Ptychitidae. The early growth stages of Ussuria are like Dimorphoceras, the intermediate growth stage like Thalassoceras.

== Taxonomy ==
Hyatt classified Ussuria in the Ussuriidae, based on Siberian forms, which is followed by W.J. Akell, et al., in the American Treatise part L, 1957. Related genera include Metussuria, Oxyussuria, and Parussuria.

Other classifications place Ussuriidae, including Ussuria, in the Meekocerataceae, an alternative for the Noritaceae.
