= Costigymnites =

Costigymnites Temporal range: Lower Anisian 243.7–242.5 Ma

Scientific classification
- Domain: Eukaryota
- Kingdom: Animalia
- Phylum: Mollusca
- Class: Cephalopoda
- Subclass: †Ammonoidea
- Order: †Ceratitida
- Family: †Gymnitidae
- Genus: †Costigymnites; Krystyn and Tatzreiter, 1991

Species
- C. asiaticus

Extinct genus of molluscs

Costigymnites is an extinct genus of cephalopods belonging to the Ammonite subclass that lived in lower Anisian (Bithynian, Ismidicus zone) in what is now Iran. The only known species is C. asiaticus, which is known from 2 incomplete specimens.
