= Karangatites =

Karangatites Temporal range: Early Triassic

Scientific classification
- Domain: Eukaryota
- Kingdom: Animalia
- Phylum: Mollusca
- Class: Cephalopoda
- Subclass: †Ammonoidea
- Order: †Ceratitida
- Family: †Meekoceratidae
- Genus: †Karangatites; Popov 1968

Genus of molluscs (fossil)

Karangatites is a genus of ceratitid ammonites included in the Meekoceratidae, found in the upper Lower Triassic, Olenkean stage, of far eastern Russia.

== Species ==
- Karangatites evolutus.
