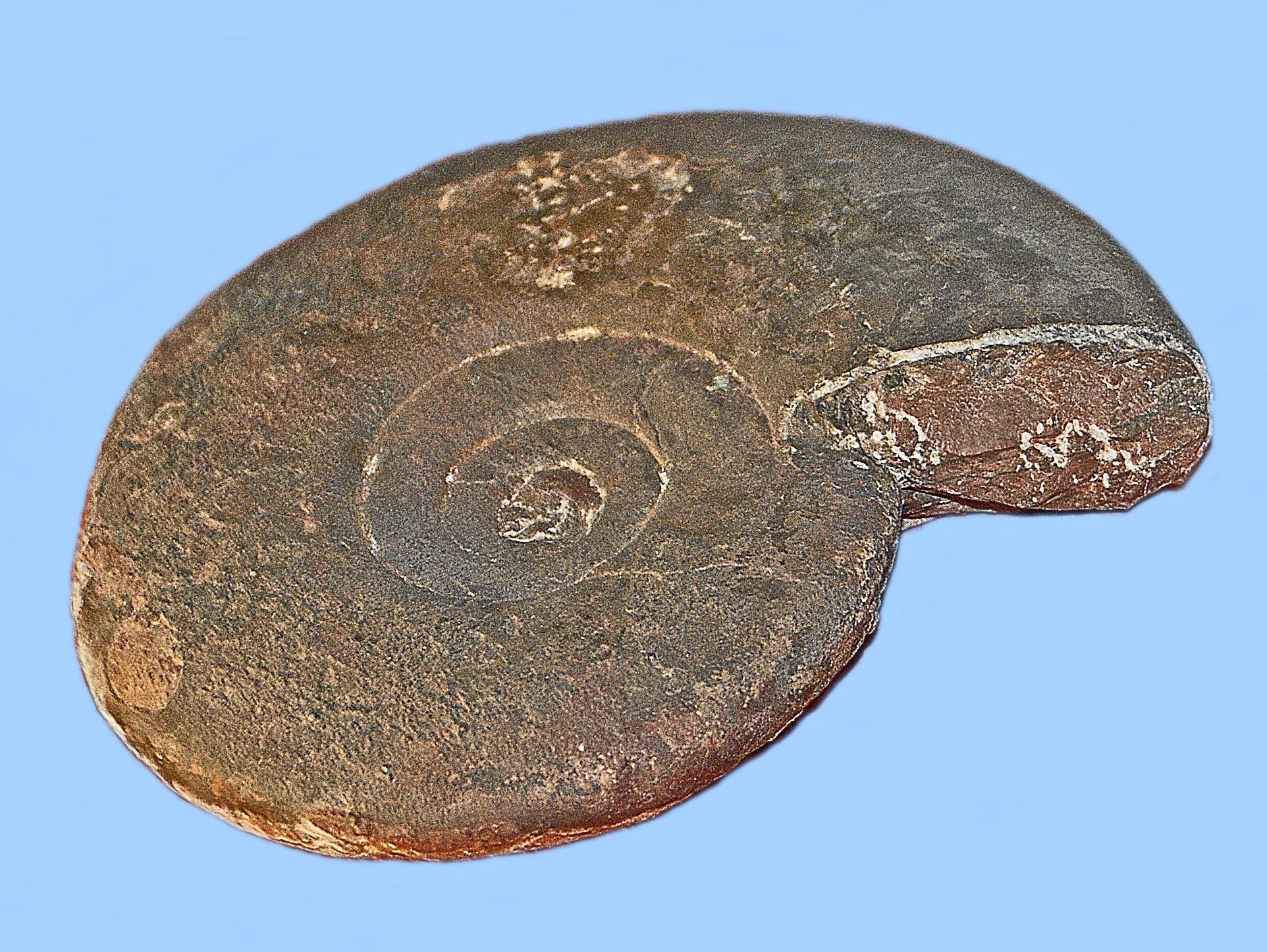
- Gymnites incultus from Bosnia, on display at Galerie de paléontologie et d'anatomie comparée in Paris

Scientific classification
- Domain: Eukaryota
- Kingdom: Animalia
- Phylum: Mollusca
- Class: Cephalopoda
- Subclass: †Ammonoidea
- Order: †Ceratitida
- Superfamily: †Pinacoceratoidea
- Family: †Gymnitidae; Waagen, 1898

Genera
- See text

= Gymnitidae =

Gymnitidae Temporal range: Early Triassic–Middle Triassic

Extinct family of ammonites

Gymnitidae is a family of Lower to Middle Triassic ammonite cephalopods with evolute, discoidal shells.

Hyatt and Smith (1905, p. 114-115) included the Gymnitidae in the suborder Ceratitoidea, which later became the superfamily Ceratitaceae and included in it genera more primitive than Gymnites as well as the more advanced Gymnites. Those being Xenaspis, Flemingites, and Ophiceras. Derivation as shown in Smith (1932 p. 30) is from Xenodiscus.

The more primitive Xenaspis, Flemingites, and Ophiceras, found in Lower Triassic beds in western America have ceratitic sutures. The more developed Gymnites has deeply digitate ammonitic sutures.

Arkell, et al., 1957, in the Treatise on Invertebrate Paleontology, on the other hand included the Gymnitidae in the Pinacocerataceae as the earlier and more primitive of its two families, combining Gymnites with coeval and more advanced forms. Genera included in the Gymnitidae sensu Arkell include Eogymnites, Buddhaites, Japanites, and of course, Gemnites. The genus Xiphogymnites was included by Tozer in 1981.

Whether to place the Gymnitidae in the Ceratitaceae, as in Hyatt and Smith, combining Gymnites with its more primitive relatives, or in the Pinacocerataceae, as in Arkell et al., combining Gymnites with its coeval or more advanced relatives is a matter of perspective which does little to change the overall phylogeny.
