= Ophiceratidae =

Ophiceratidae Temporal range: Lower Triassic

Scientific classification
- Kingdom: Animalia
- Phylum: Mollusca
- Class: Cephalopoda
- Subclass: †Ammonoidea
- Order: †Ceratitida
- Superfamily: †Noritoidea
- Family: †Ophiceratidae; Arthaber 1911

Genera
- See text

Extinct family of molluscs

The Ophiceratidae is a family in the ammonoid order Ceratitida from the Lower Triassic, previously included in the Otocerataceae but now placed in the Noritiaceae as revised.

The Ophiceratidae produced sepenticones with compressed elliptical whorl sections in which the venter is generally rounded and ornamentation is usually weak. The suture is simple, ceratitic.

Named genera include Ophiceras, the type, Discophiceras, Nordophiceras, Sakhaites, Vishnuites, and Wordieoceras.

The phonetically similar Ophioceratidae of Strand 1934 is synonymous with Ophidioceratidae Hyatt, 1894 a family in the nautiloid cephalopod order, Tarphycerida.
