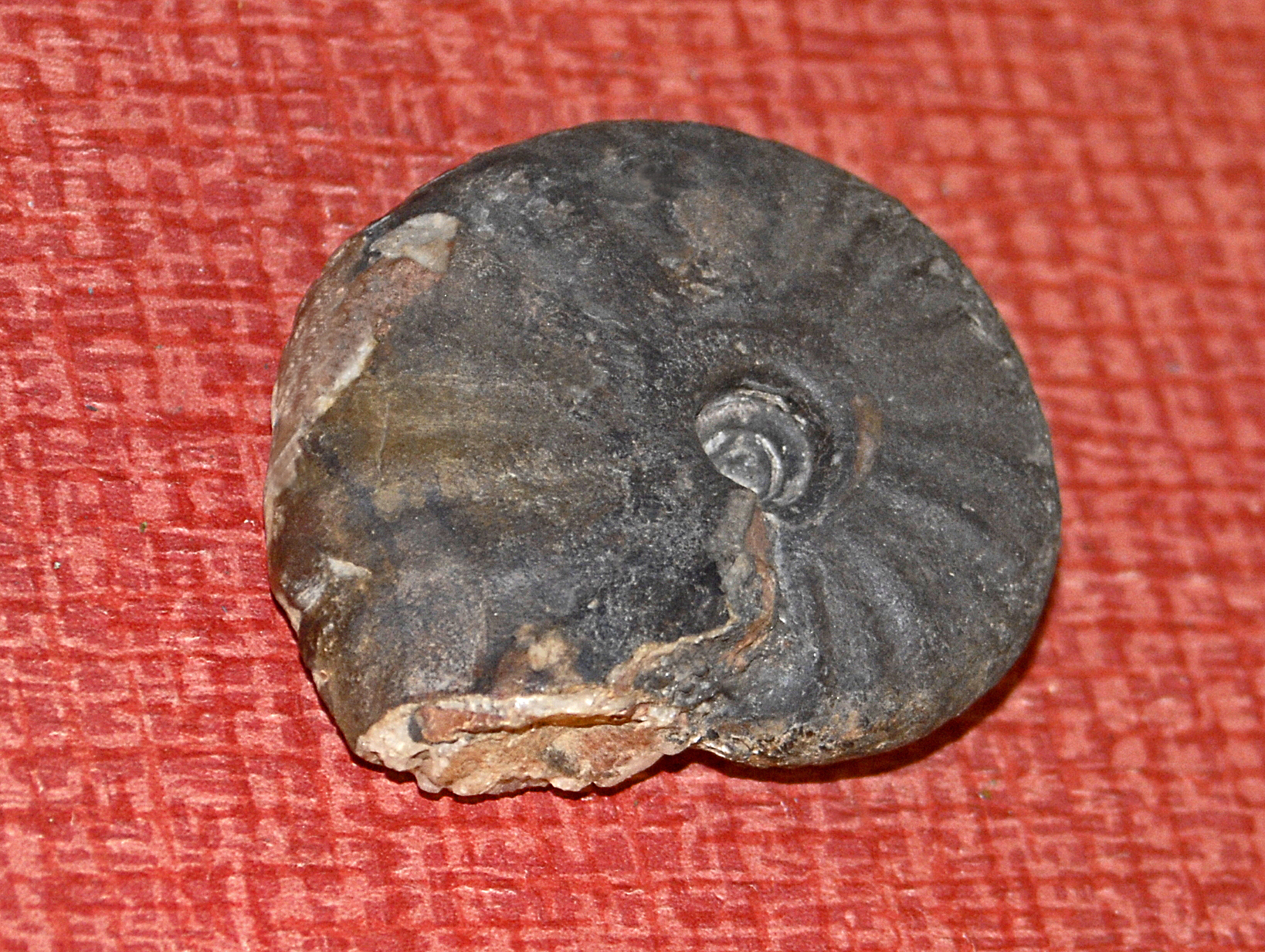
- fossil of ptychites studeri

Scientific classification
- Kingdom: Animalia
- Phylum: Mollusca
- Class: Cephalopoda
- Subclass: †Ammonoidea
- Order: †Ceratitida
- Superfamily: †Ptychitoidea; Tozer, 1994

Families
- See text

Synonyms
- Ptychitaceae

= Ptychitoidea =

Ptychitoidea Temporal range: M Triassic - U Triassic

Extinct superfamily of molluscs

Ptychitoidea, formerly Ptychitacheae, is a superfamily of typically involute, subglobular to discoidal Ceratitida in which the shell is smooth with lateral folds or striations, inner whorls are globose, and the suture is commonly ammonitic. Their range is Middle_ and Upper Triassic.

In its present configuration the Ptychitoidea includes three families, the:

- Ptychitidae
- Eosagenitidae
- Sturiidae

This differs from the taxonomy in the Treatise on Invertebrate Paleontology, Part L, in which the Ptychitoidea included the

- Ptychitidae
- Isculitidae
- Nannititdae

The Isculitidae have since been removed to the Pinacocerataceae and the Nannitidae to the Danubitaceae.

Fossils of Ptychitoidea have been found in the Triassic of California and Nevada in the United States; British Columbia and Nunavut in Canada; Italy, Switzerland, and Hungary in Europe; Russia, China, and Afghanistan in Eurasia; Tunisia, Oman, Malaysia, and Papua New Guinea.
