= Stephanitidae =

Scientific classification
- Kingdom: Animalia
- Phylum: Mollusca
- Class: Cephalopoda
- Subclass: †Ammonoidea
- Order: †Ceratitida
- Superfamily: †Noritoidea
- Family: †Stephanitidae

Genera
- Amphistephanites; Stephanites

Extinct family of molluscs

Stephanitidae is an extinct family of cephalopod belonging to the ammonite superfamily Noritoidea.
