= Amphistephanites =

Scientific classification
- Domain: Eukaryota
- Kingdom: Animalia
- Phylum: Mollusca
- Class: Cephalopoda
- Subclass: †Ammonoidea
- Order: †Ceratitida
- Family: †Stephanitidae
- Genus: †Amphistephanites; Arthaber, 1896

Genus of molluscs (fossil)

Amphistephanites is an extinct genus of cephalopod belonging to the ammonite subclass.
