= Arctomeekoceras =

Arctomeekoceras Temporal range: L Triassic (Scythian)

Scientific classification
- Kingdom: Animalia
- Phylum: Mollusca
- Class: Cephalopoda
- Subclass: †Ammonoidea
- Order: †Ceratitida
- Family: †Meekoceratidae
- Genus: †Arctomeekoceras

Genus of molluscs (fossil)

Arctomeekoceras is a genus of ammonoids in the order Ceratitida from the Early Triassic, included in the Meekoceratidae; a family characterized by more or less involute, compressed, discoidal forms that are smooth or weakly ornamented and have a ceratitic suture with broad saddles.

Arctomeekoceras lived from about 250 to about 245 m.y.a and has been found in arctic Canada (Nunavut) in the Blind Fiord Formation associated with Neomeekoceras, Olenikites, and Pseudosageceras; and in far northern Siberia, Russian Federation, associated with Boreomeekoceras, Pseudosageceras, Olenikites, Keyserlingites, Sibirites, Nordophiceras, Olenekoceras, and Subolenekites
