= Lanceolitidae =

Scientific classification
- Kingdom: Animalia
- Phylum: Mollusca
- Class: Cephalopoda
- Subclass: †Ammonoidea
- Order: †Ceratitida
- Superfamily: †Noritoidea
- Family: †Lanceolitidae; Spath 1934

Genera
- Lanceolites

Lanceolitidae is an extinct family of cephalopods belonging to the Ammonite order Ceratitida and superfamily Noritoidea.
