= Noritidae =

Noritidae Temporal range: L - M Triassic

Scientific classification
- Domain: Eukaryota
- Kingdom: Animalia
- Phylum: Mollusca
- Class: Cephalopoda
- Subclass: †Ammonoidea
- Order: †Ceratitida
- Superfamily: †Noritoidea
- Family: †Noritidae; Karpinsky 1889

Genera
- Albanites; Ananorites; Arthaberites; Bosnites; Metahedenstroemia; Neoclypites; Norites

The Noritidae, sometimes spelled Noritidea, is an extinct cephalopod family of belonging to the ammonoid order Ceratitida and superfamily Noritoidea.

The Noritidae, which lived during the Early and Middle Triassic, are characterized by smooth, flat, discoidal shells with tabulate venters bordered by pronounced shoulders. Sutures are ceratitic with club-shaped saddles.
