= Albanites =

Albanites Temporal range: Lower Triassic

Scientific classification
- Kingdom: Animalia
- Phylum: Mollusca
- Class: Cephalopoda
- Subclass: †Ammonoidea
- Order: †Ceratitida
- Family: †Noritidae
- Genus: †Albanites; Arthaber, 1909

Genus of molluscs (fossil)

Albanites is a genus of extinct cephalopods belonging to the ammonoid order Ceratitida that lived during the Early Triassic epoch.

== Appearance ==
The shell of Albanites is more or less involute, smooth or faintly ribbed. Sides are flattened; the venter, which is the outer rim, is broadly rounded. Sutures are ceratitic with jagged lobes and rounded saddles.

== Classification ==
Albanites is included in the family Meekoceratidae although Arkell, et al. (1957) included it in the Noritidae in the Treatise Part L, 1957.
