= Ussuriidae =

Nortitaceae

Scientific classification
- Kingdom: Animalia
- Phylum: Mollusca
- Class: Cephalopoda
- Subclass: †Ammonoidea
- Order: †Ceratitida
- Superfamily: †Noritoidea
- Family: †Ussuriidae; Spath 1930

Genera
- Metussuria; Oxyussuria; Parussuria; Ussuria

Extinct family of molluscs

Ussuriidae is an extinct family of cephalopods belonging to the Ammonite order Ceratitida and superfamily Noritoidea.
