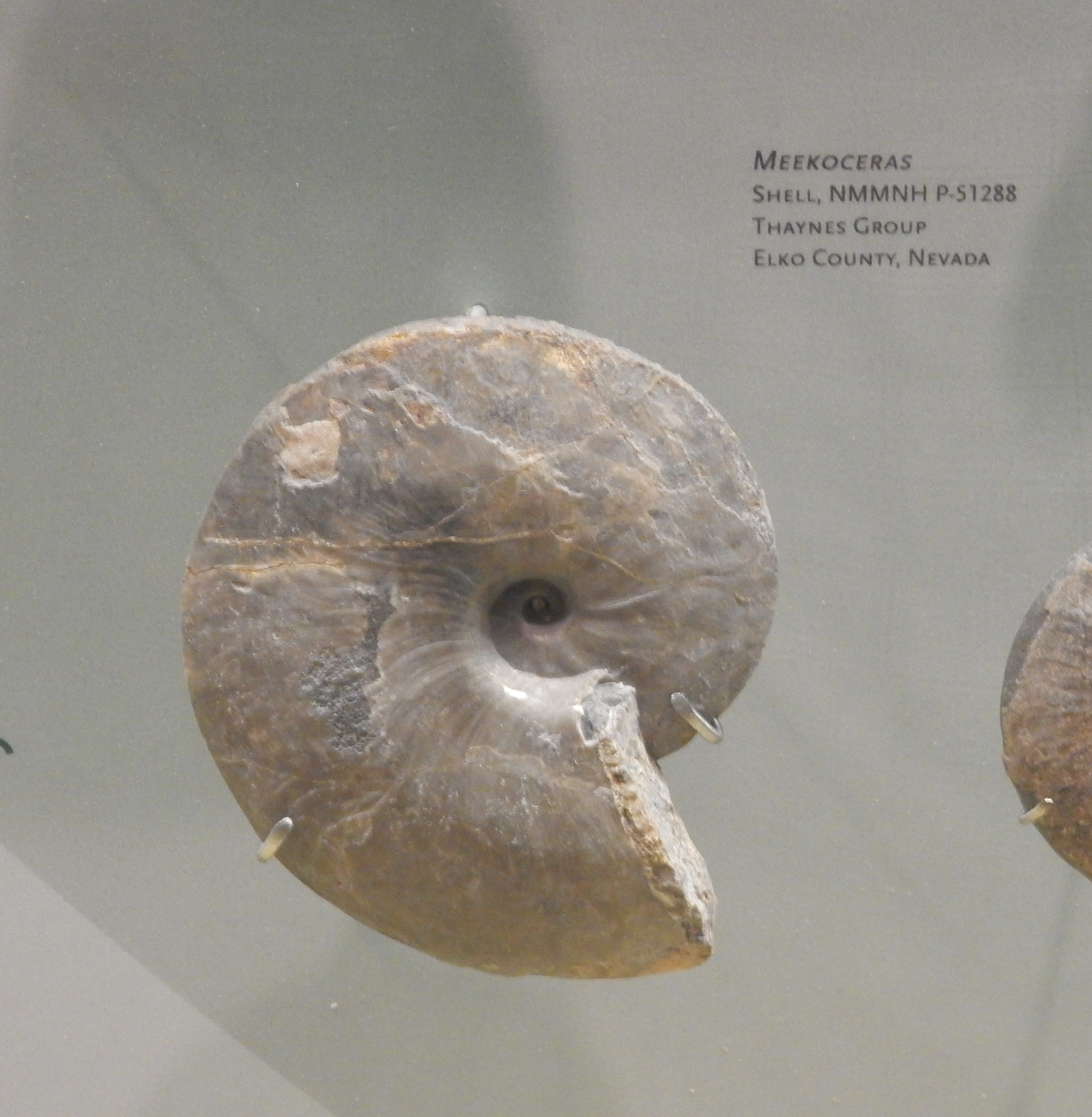
- Meekoceras at the New Mexico Museum of Natural History and Science

Scientific classification
- Kingdom: Animalia
- Phylum: Mollusca
- Class: Cephalopoda
- Subclass: †Ammonoidea
- Order: †Ceratitida
- Family: †Meekoceratidae
- Genus: †Meekoceras; Hyatt, 1879

= Meekoceras =

Meekoceras Temporal range: Olenekian

Extinct genus of ceratitid ammonites

Meekoceras is an extinct genus of ceratitid ammonites with a discoidal shell that lived during the Early Triassic Epoch.

== Description ==
Meekoceras is characterized by a compressed, discoidal, evolute or involute shell with flattened sides and narrow, flattened or rounded venter that is without keels or furrows. The surface is smooth or with lateral folds, but no tubercles, spines, or spiral ridges. Umbilicus variable, body chamber short. Sutures ceratitic with smooth rounded saddles and serrated lobes.

== Taxonomic position ==
Smith (1932) and Arkell et al. (1957) included Meekoceras in the Meekoceratidae, which was named to contain the genus. Different approaches were made regarding the next taxonomic level. Arkell, et al. (1957) includes Meekoceratidae in the Noritoidea while Smith (1932) included them in the Prolecanitoidea.

Wyoningites and Svalbardiceras are related genera.
