= Ananorites =

Ananorites Temporal range: Middle Triassic

Scientific classification
- Domain: Eukaryota
- Kingdom: Animalia
- Phylum: Mollusca
- Class: Cephalopoda
- Subclass: †Ammonoidea
- Order: †Ceratitida
- Family: †Noritidae
- Genus: †Ananorites; Diener 1907

Genus of molluscs (fossil)

Ananorites is a genus of extinct cephalopods belonging to the ceratitd family Noritidae found in the Middle Triassic of the Himalaya. The shell is thinly discoidal, evolute, and smooth; cross section highly compressed; venter narrowly rounded except at the late stage where sharp shoulders are developed.

As with others of its kind, Ananorites was probably a nektonic (swimming) stalking marine predator that spent its time hunting above the sea floor.
