= Arthaberites =

Arthaberites Temporal range: Triassic

Scientific classification
- Domain: Eukaryota
- Kingdom: Animalia
- Phylum: Mollusca
- Class: Cephalopoda
- Subclass: †Ammonoidea
- Order: †Ceratitida
- Family: †Noritidae
- Genus: †Arthaberites; Diener 1900

Extinct genus of mollusc

Arthaberites is a genus of ceratitid cephalopods included in the Noritidae that lived during the Middle Triassic, found in the Alps and Balkans of Europe. Its type is A. alexandrae.

Arthaberites has an involute, compressed, discoidal shell with a narrow flatted venter, or outer rim.
