= Dagnoceras =

Dagnoceras Temporal range: Olenekian

Scientific classification
- Kingdom: Animalia
- Phylum: Mollusca
- Class: Cephalopoda
- Subclass: †Ammonoidea
- Order: †Ceratitida
- Family: †Dinaritidae
- Genus: †Dagnoceras; Arthaber 1911

Species
- Dagnoceras zappanense

Dagnoceras is a ceratitid ammonite from the Lower Triassic that has a basically evolutute, discoidal shell with an arched venter and ceratitic sutures. The Treatise 1957 includes it in the Meekoceratidae although it has since been placed in the Dinaritidae.
