= Anaflemingites =

Conservation status
- Extinct

Scientific classification
- Domain: Eukaryota
- Kingdom: Animalia
- Phylum: Mollusca
- Class: Cephalopoda
- Subclass: †Ammonoidea
- Genus: †Anaflemingites

Genus of molluscs (fossil)

Anaflemingites is an extinct genus of cephalopods belonging to the Ammonite subclass.
