= Megasphaeroceras =

Megasphaeroceras Temporal range: Bajocian

Scientific classification
- Kingdom: Animalia
- Phylum: Mollusca
- Class: Cephalopoda
- Subclass: Ammonoidea
- Family: Sphaeroceratidae
- Genus: Megasphaeroceras Imlay, 1961

Extinct genus of molluscs

Megasphaeroceras is an ammonite genus included in Sphaeroceratidae, a family of ammonoid cephalopods characterized by their spheroidal shells with markedly eccentric coiling, fine ribbing, and complex sutures, known from the Bajocian.
