= Inyoites =

Inyoites Temporal range: Early Triassic

Scientific classification
- Kingdom: Animalia
- Phylum: Mollusca
- Class: Cephalopoda
- Subclass: †Ammonoidea
- Order: †Ceratitida
- Family: †Inyoitidae
- Genus: †Inyoites; Hyatt & Smith, 1905

Genus of molluscs (fossil)

Inyoites is an ammonoid genus from the Lower Triassic, included in the ceratitid family Inyoitidae.

Inyoites was first described by Hyatt and Smith. The type species, Inyoites owenii, came from the Meekoceras bed of the Union Wash Formation, Inyo County, California. Another species, I. sedini, from the Olenekian of Russia, was described by Yuri D. Zakharov and N. M. Abnavi in 2012.

The shell of Inyoites is generally evolute, narrow, flat sided, with later whorls moderately enveloping those previous. The venter is moderately to sharply keeled, the suture is ceratitic, with smooth saddles and serrate lobes. Inyoites is described in W.J. Arkell, et al, 1957 as "Platycones with high hollow keel and distinct umbilical shoulder; radial ribs that diminish toward compressed venter"
