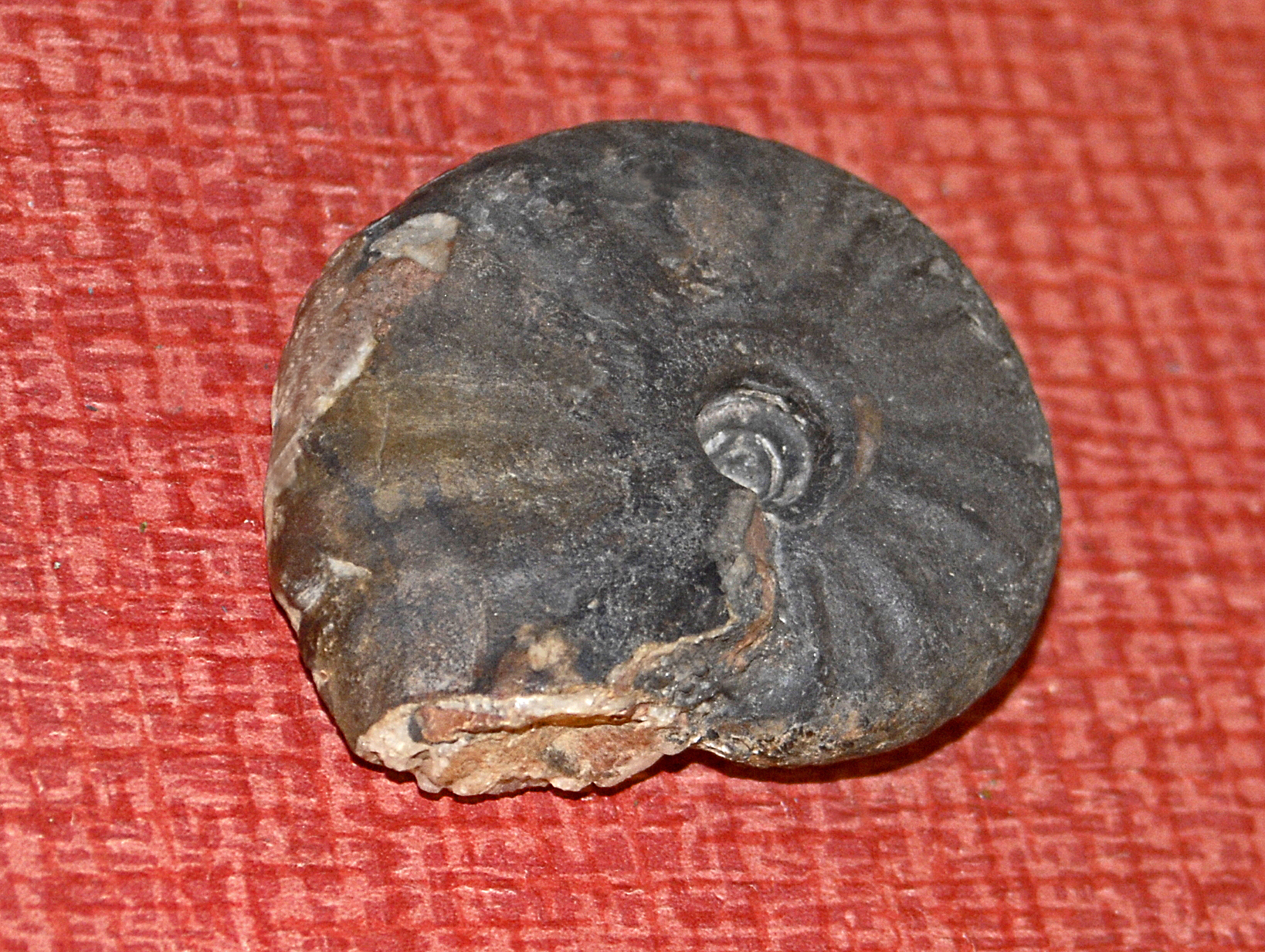
- Fossil of Ptychites studeri from Bosnia, on display at Galerie de paléontologie et d'anatomie comparée in Paris

Scientific classification
- Domain: Eukaryota
- Kingdom: Animalia
- Phylum: Mollusca
- Class: Cephalopoda
- Subclass: †Ammonoidea
- Order: †Ceratitida
- Family: †Ptychitidae
- Genus: †Ptychites; Mojsisovics, 1875

= Ptychites =

Ptychites Temporal range: Middle Triassic, 247.2 –235.0 Ma

Genus of molluscs (fossil)

Ptychites is an extinct genus of cephalopods belonging to the family Ptychitidae. These nektonic carnivores lived during the Triassic period, from Anisian to Ladinian age.

== Species ==
- Ptychites besnosovi Shevyrev 1995
- Ptychites densistriatus Bucher 1992
- Ptychites domatus Silberling and Tozer 1968
- Ptychites evansi Smith 1914
- Ptychites gradinarui Bucher 1992
- Ptychites guloensis Tozer 1994
- Ptychites hamatus Tozer 1994
- Ptychites miyagiensis Bando 1964
- Ptychites nipponicus Bando 1964
- Ptychites oppeli Mojsisovic 1882
- Ptychites opulentus Mojsisovics 1882
- Ptychites pseudoeuglyphus Konstantinov 1991
- Ptychites stachei Mojsisovics 1882
- Ptychites trochleaeformis Lindstroem 1865
- Ptychites wrighti McLearn 1946

== Description ==
Species in this genus are quite variable in form, ranging from subglobose to laterally compressed. The surface of the shell is sculptured with low folds.

== Distribution ==
Fossils of species within this genus have been found in the Triassic of Afghanistan, Austria, Canada, China, Hungary, Italy, Japan, Malaysia, Oman, Papua New Guinea, Russia, Tunisia, Turkey, United States.
