= Aristoptychites =

Aristoptychites Temporal range: Anisian

Scientific classification
- Domain: Eukaryota
- Kingdom: Animalia
- Phylum: Mollusca
- Class: Cephalopoda
- Subclass: †Ammonoidea
- Order: †Ceratitida
- Family: †Ptychitidae
- Genus: †Aristoptychites; Diener, 1916

Genus of molluscs (fossil)

Aristoptychites is an extinct genus of cephalopod from the Anisian stage of the Middle Triassic belonging to the ammonoid subclass.

Shell involute, whorls strongly embraced, venter acutely rounded. Suture curved, subammonitic; more closely resembles that of Flexoptychites or Discoptychites than of other ptychitids.
