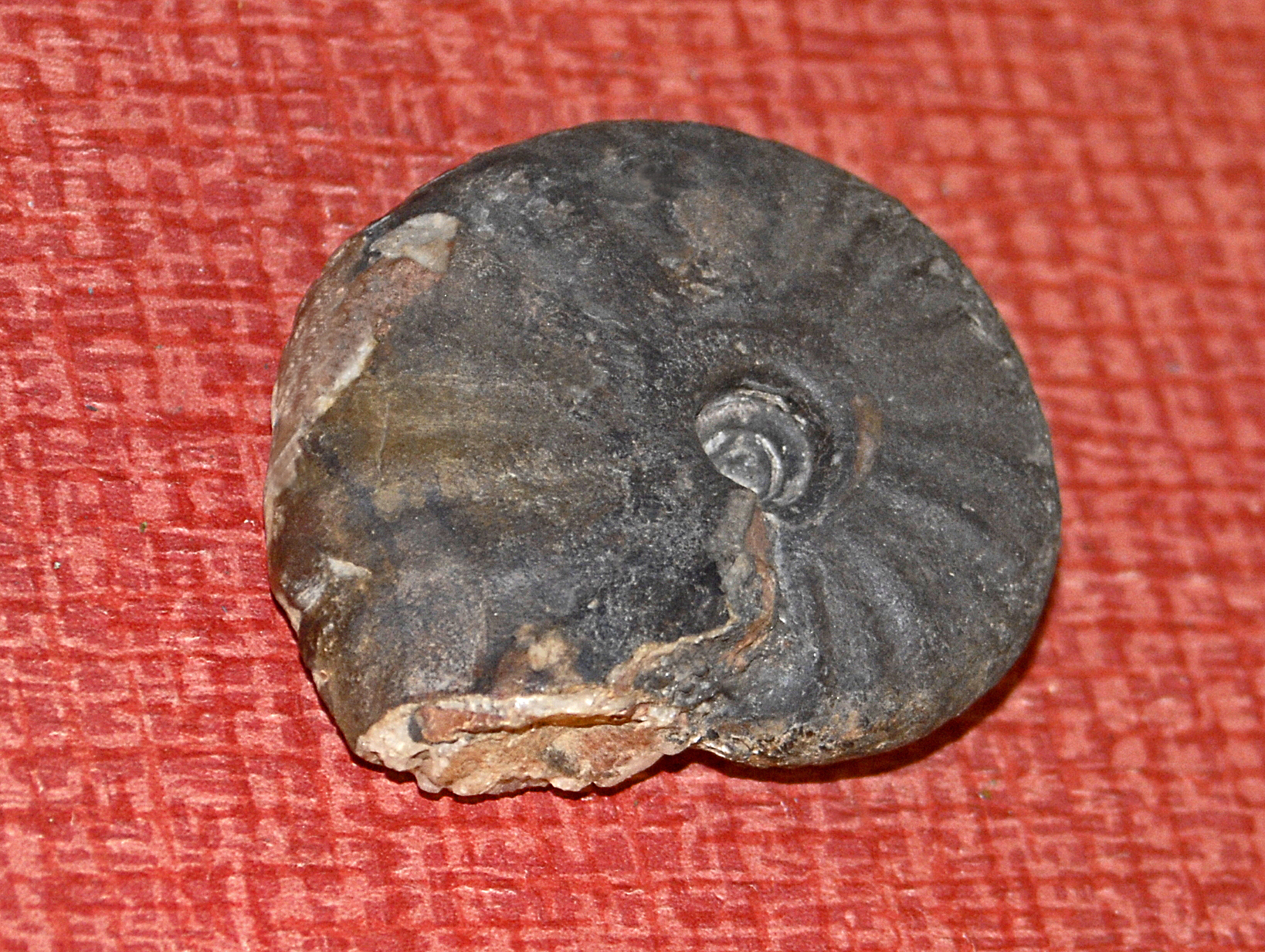
- Fossil of Ptychites studeri from Bosnia, on display at Galerie de paléontologie et d'anatomie comparée in Paris

Scientific classification
- Domain: Eukaryota
- Kingdom: Animalia
- Phylum: Mollusca
- Class: Cephalopoda
- Subclass: †Ammonoidea
- Order: †Ceratitida
- Superfamily: †Ptychitoidea
- Family: †Ptychitidae; Mojsisovics 1882

= Ptychitidae =

Ptychitidae Temporal range: M Triassic - U Triassic

Family of molluscs (fossil)

The Ptychitidae is a family of ceratitid ammonites (ammonites sensu lato). They are combined with the Eosagenitidae and Sturiidae in the superfamily Ptychitoidea.

Ptychitid genera have compressed, involute shells in which the inner whorls are covered by the outermost, that may be ribbed or smooth, and ammonitic sutures with secondary elements.

== Genera ==
- Arctoptychites
- Aristoptychites
- Eosturia
- Flexoptychites
- Istreites
- Lanceoptychites
- Malletoptychites
- Ptychites
