= Pinacoceratoidea =

Scientific classification
- Kingdom: Animalia
- Phylum: Mollusca
- Class: Cephalopoda
- Subclass: †Ammonoidea
- Order: †Ceratitida
- Superfamily: †Pinacoceratoidea; Mojsisovics, 1879

Families
- See text

Synonyms
- Pinacocerataceae

Extinct superfamily of molluscs

Pinacoceratoidea, formerly Pinacocerataceae, are generally smooth, compressed, evolute to involute ammonoids from the Triassic, belonging to the Ceratitida, in which the suture is ammonitic, with adventitious and auxiliary elements.

As presently conceived, the Pinacoceratoidea, named by Mojsisovics, 1879, combines six families; the:

- Pinacoceratidae
- Carnitidae
- Gymnitidae
- Isculitidae
- Klamathitidae
- Sagenitidae

In Treatise on Invertebrate Paleontology, Part L, the superfamily included only the Pinacoceratidae and Gymnitidae. Of the families more newly included in the Pinacocerataceae, the Carnitidae was removed from the Ceratitaceae and the Isculitidae from the Ptychitaceae. Klamathites was removed from the Carnitidae as type for the Klamathitidae. The Sagenitidae is based on the subfamily Sagenitinae of the tropitacean family Haloritidae.

Fossils have been found in Triassic sediments in the United States in California, Nevada, and Alaska; in Canada in British Columbia; in Europe widespread; in China, Russia, Afghanistan, and Vietnam.
