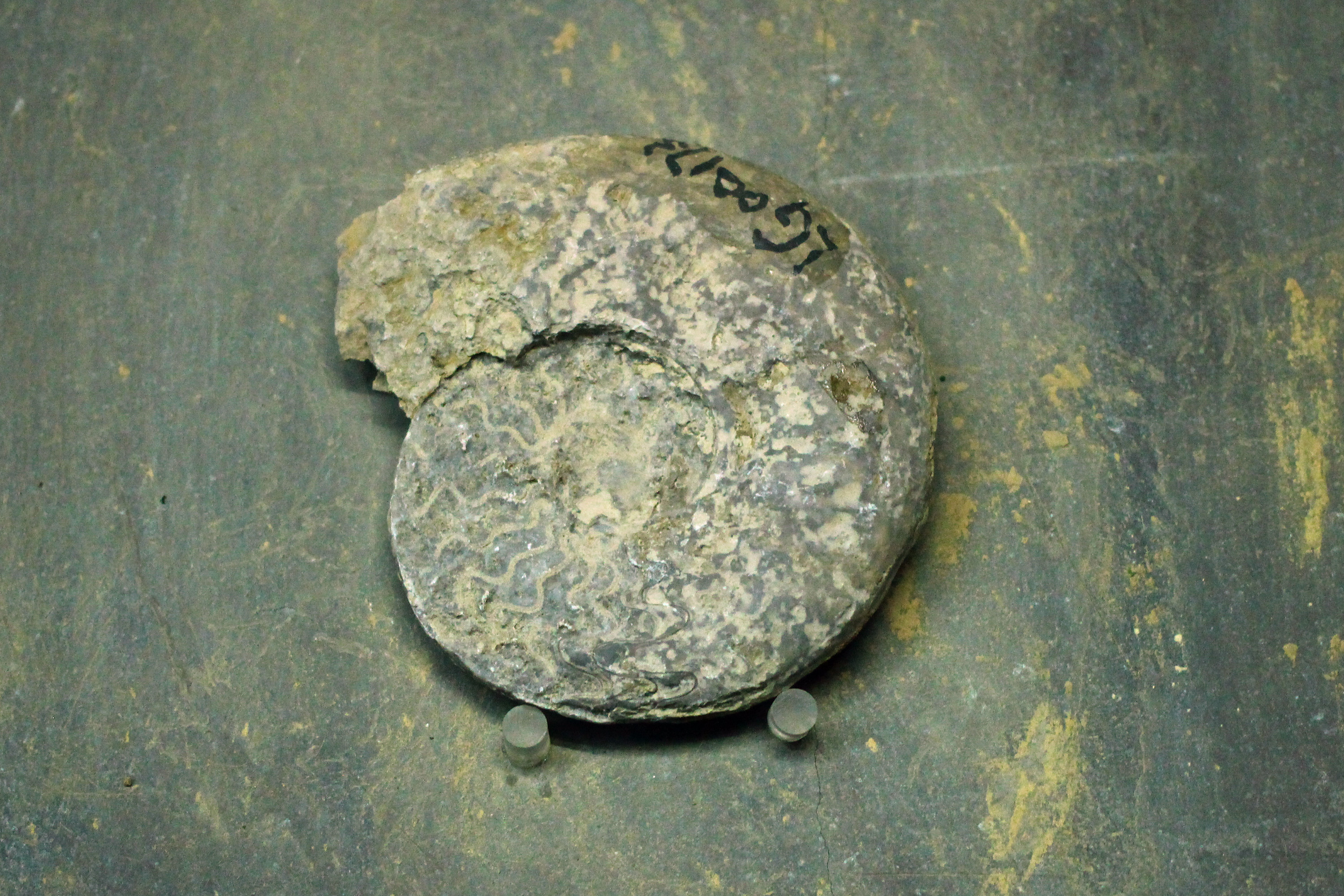

Scientific classification
- Kingdom: Animalia
- Phylum: Mollusca
- Class: Cephalopoda
- Subclass: †Ammonoidea
- Order: †Ceratitida
- Family: †Flemingitidae
- Genus: †Flemingites; Waagen, 1892

= Flemingites =

Flemingites Temporal range: Olenekian

Genus of molluscs (fossil)

Flemingites is an extinct genus of evolute, ceratitic ammonoid from the Smithian portion of the Olenekian age (Lower Triassic Period) with spiral ridges on the shell.

== Diagnosis ==
The shell of Flemingites is evolute so that all whorls are externally visible. The whorls are robust, slightly embracing, and usually a little higher than wide and the whorl expansion rate is apparently very slow. The venter (outside rim) of the shell is somewhat flattened and usually much narrower that the widest part of the whorl.

Strong, always single, lateral ribs are confined to the sides of the shell. Fine spiral ridges typically cover the shell as well and can be found even on casts of this genus. The suture is distinctly ceratitic: with rounded entire saddles and deep serrated lobes.

== Taxonomic position ==
In 1932, American geologist and paleontologist James Perrin Smith included Flemingites in the family Xenodiscidae, which was included in the superfamily Prolecanitoidea (note spelling as of date given). It has since been reassigned to the Flemingitidae and Noritaceae as shown in part L of the American Treatise on Invertebrate Paleontology. The Treatise also suggests this genus to be descended from or related to Ophiceras.

Other classifications put Flemingites in the Meekocerataceae, or in the recently renamed Meekoceratoidea.

== Distribution ==
Flemingites is found widespread throughout marine rocks deposited during the early Triassic Period in the northern hemisphere. It has been studied, for example, from rocks in North America by Smith.
