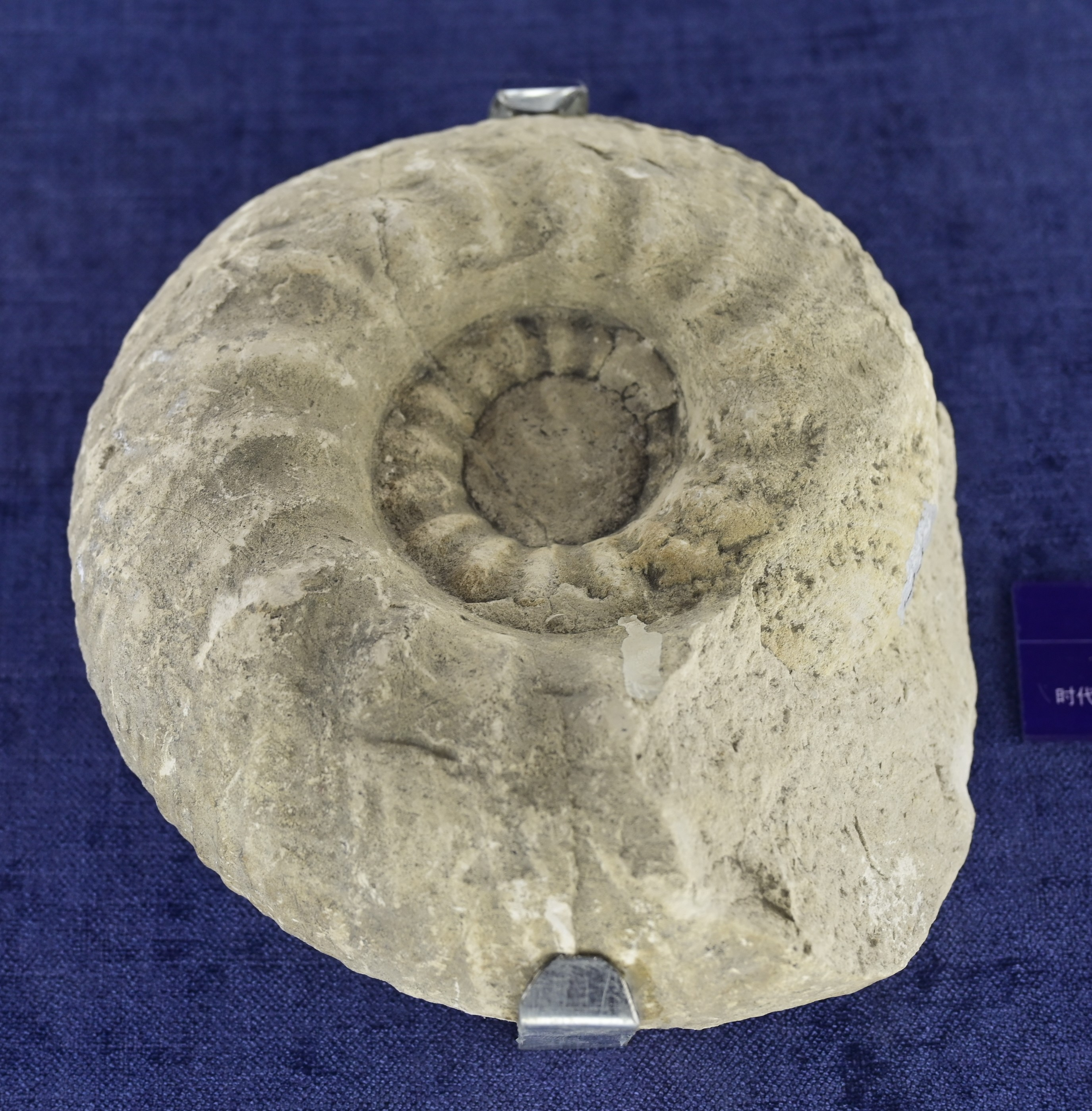
- Fossil, National Natural History Museum of China

Scientific classification
- Kingdom: Animalia
- Phylum: Mollusca
- Class: Cephalopoda
- Subclass: †Ammonoidea
- Order: †Ceratitida
- Family: †Ophiceratidae
- Genus: †Ophiceras; Griesbach, 1880

= Ophiceras =

Ophiceras Temporal range: Induan

Genus of molluscs (fossil)

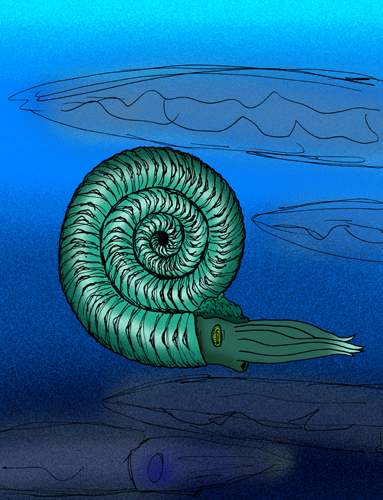
Reconstruction of O. himalayanum

Ophiceras is an extinct genus of smooth, evolute ceratitid ammonites from the Griesbachian (Early Triassic), with a rounded venter. Fossils of the genus have been found in Armenia, Azerbaijan, China, Greenland, and India.

== Diagnosis ==
The shell of Ophiceras evolute, whorls all showing, slowly increasing in height, and slightly embracing the previous. Umbilicus, wide and moderately deep. Surface ornamented with faint folds, which in some develop into coarse ribs in the mature growth stage, and transverse striae. Suture is ceratitic, lobes and saddles usually long and narrow.

== Taxonomy ==
Ophiceras is included in the Ophiceratidae according to the Treatise on Invertebrate Paleontology, but was earlier placed in the Xenodiscidae.

Five subgenera are recognized (in brackets): Ophiceras (Ophiceras), O. (Acanthophiceras), O. (Discophiceras), O. (Lytophiceras), O. (Metophiceras).

Ophiceras probably gave rise to Flemingites, which it somewhat resembles.
