= Noritoidea =

Scientific classification
- Domain: Eukaryota
- Kingdom: Animalia
- Phylum: Mollusca
- Class: Cephalopoda
- Subclass: †Ammonoidea
- Order: †Ceratitida
- Superfamily: †Noritoidea

Families
- Inyoitidae; Lanceolitidae; Noritidae; Ophiceratidae; Stephanitidae; Ussuriidae

Superfamily of molluscs (fossil)

Noritoidea, formerly Noritaceae, is an extinct superfamily of cephalopods belonging to the Ammonite order Ceratitida.

Noritoidea, defined by Karpinsky in 1889, combines ceratitids with "typically smooth, more or less discoidal shells with rounded or truncate peripheries and ceratitic sutures,...." Keeled or ribbed offshoots may have simpler or more complex sutures.

== Taxonomy ==
Noritoidea as revised (Tozer 1981) is composed of the Noritidae, Inyoitidae, Lanceolitidae, Ophiceratidae, Stephanitidae, Ussuriidae

Noritidae is the type family of the Noritoidea and may have been derived from the Dieneroceratidae through the Xenoceltitidae.

The Inyoitidae is based on the Inyoitinae, which was removed from the Xenoceltitidae and elevated in rank.

The Lanceolitidae, containing Lanceolites as the sole representative, was included in the Hedenstroemiidae as the Lanceolitinae.

The Ophiceratidae and the Stephanoceratidae were removed from the Otocerataceae and the Ceratitaceae respectively.

The Ussuriidae is a small family retained in the Noritoidea.

=== Noritoidea taxonomy in the Treatise ===
The Treatise, Part L, gives 13 families in the Noritoidea, six of which collectively contain 15 subfamilies. Of these:

The Flemingitidae and Meekoceratidae have been placed in the Meekocerataceae along with the Prionitidae and Proptychitidae.

The Hedenstroemiidae, less the Lanceolitinae, have been combined with middle and upper Triassic late derivatives of the Medlicottiadae, the Sageceratidae, in what is known as the Sageceratceae. Medlicottiadae is a family in the Melicottiaceae, a superfamily of prolecanitids (order Prolecanitida).

Sageceras, type genus of the Sageceratidae, is described as having lenticular shells with flattened bicarinate venters and small umbilici. Sutures form numerous subequal auxiliary and adventitious lobes.

Hedenstroemiidae are described as having discoidal, compressed, generally smooth, involute shells with tabulate to oxynote venters. Suture are ceratitic with adventitious saddles and lobes.
