= Meekoceratidae =

Meekoceratidae Temporal range: Early-Middle Triassic

Scientific classification
- Kingdom: Animalia
- Phylum: Mollusca
- Class: Cephalopoda
- Subclass: †Ammonoidea
- Order: †Ceratitida
- Superfamily: †Noritoidea
- Family: †Meekoceratidae; Waagen, 1985

Extinct family of mollusks

The Meekoceratidae is a family of ceratitid ammonites described in the Treatise on Invertebrate Paleontology, as being more or less involute, compressed, discoidal, smooth to weakly ornamented; venter arched or tabulate; sutures ceratitic with broad saddles. Now includes four subfamilies.
