= List of the prehistoric life of Idaho =

This list of the prehistoric life of Idaho contains the various prehistoric life-forms whose fossilized remains have been reported from within the US state of Idaho.

== Paleozoic ==
=== Selected Paleozoic taxa of Idaho ===
- †Acrothyra
- †Adrianites
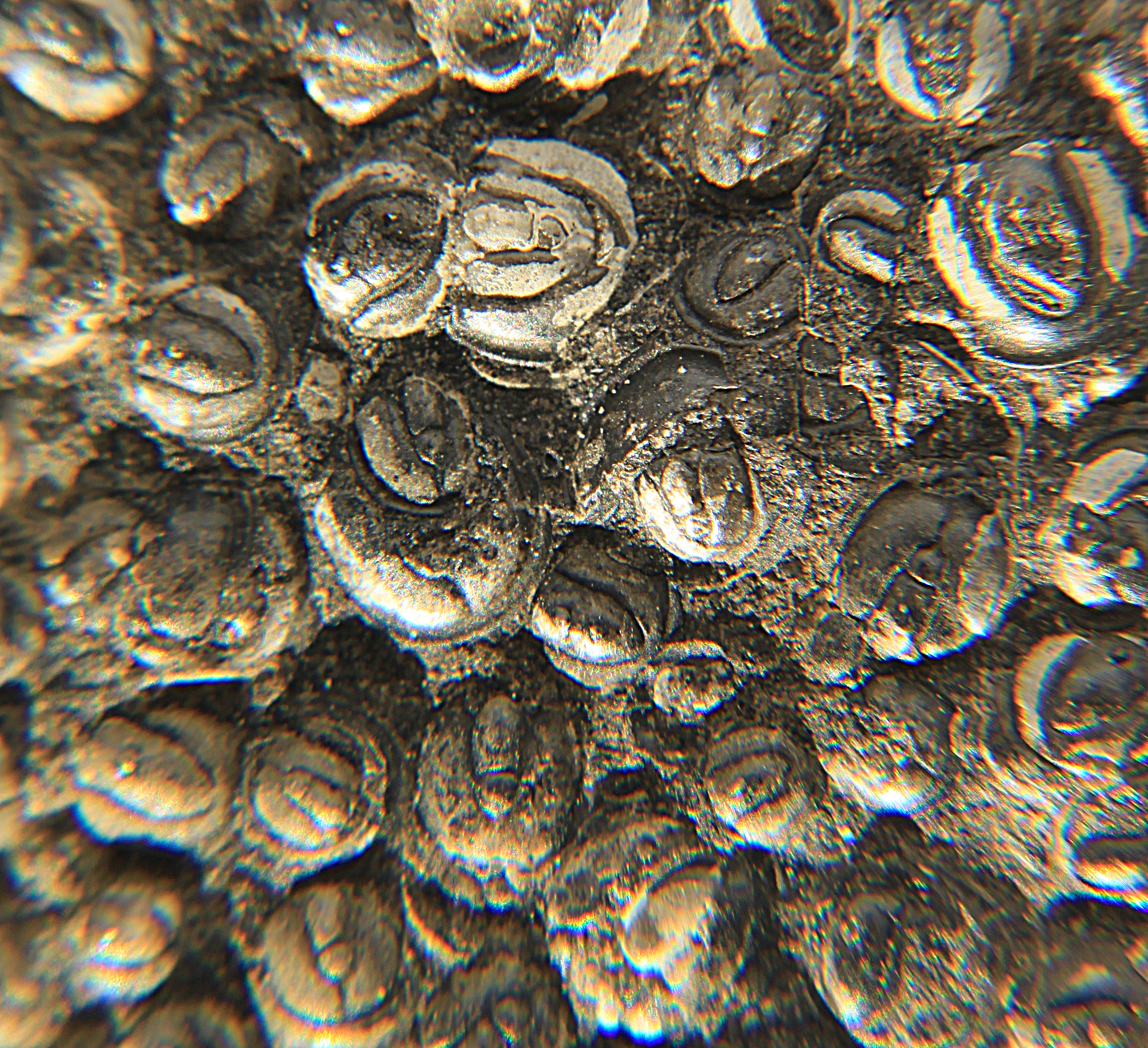
- Assemblage of fossils of the Cambrian trilobite Agnostus
  †Agnostus
- †Amplexus
- † Ananias
- Archaeolithophyllum
- †Atrypa
- †Aulopora
- †Aviculopecten
  - †Aviculopecten kaibabensis – or unidentified comparable form
- † Avonia
- †Bathyuriscus
- †Benthamaspis
- †Caninia
- †Cardiograptus
- †Chancia
- †Chonetes
  - †Chonetes logani
- †Cleiothyridina
  - †Cleiothyridina sublamellosa
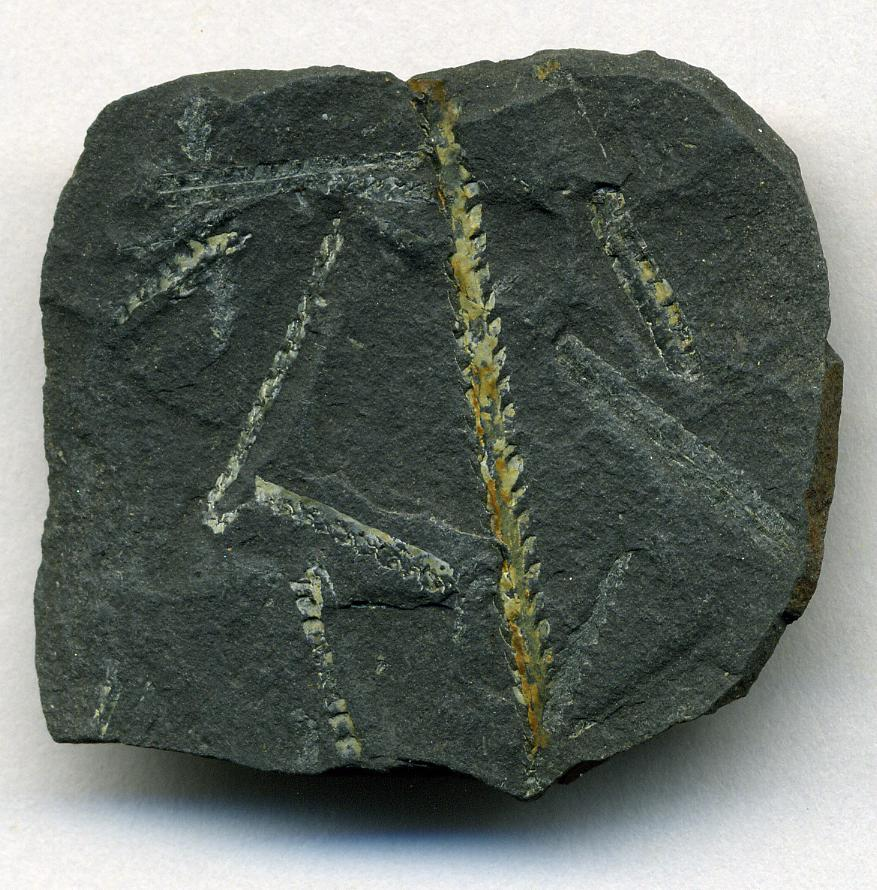
- Assemblage of fossils of the Cambrian graptolite Climacograptus
  †Climacograptus
  - †Climacograptus bicornis
  - †Climacograptus innotatus
  - †Climacograptus scalaris – or unidentified comparable form
- †Composita
  - †Composita humilis
  - †Composita idahoensis – type locality for species
  - †Composita mira – or unidentified comparable form
  - †Composita sigma
  - †Composita subquadrata
  - †Composita subtilita – or unidentified comparable form
  - †Composita sulcata
- †Cyrtograptus
- †Cystodictya
- †Dictyonema
- †Didymograptus
  - †Didymograptus extensus
- †Diplograptus
- †Edmondia
- †Ehmaniella
- †Elrathia
- †Elrathina
- †Euomphalus
- †Fenestella
- †Gastrioceras – report made of unidentified related form or using admittedly obsolete nomenclature
- †Girvanella
- †Gogia
- †Goniograptus
- †Haplophrentis
- †Helcionella
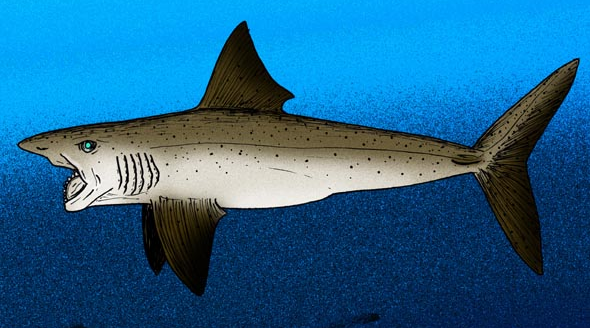
- Life restoration of the Permian Chimaera relative Helicoprion
  †Helicoprion
  - †Helicoprion davisii – type locality for species
- †Hintzeia
- †Hyolithes
- †Isograptus
- †Kazakhstania
- †Kootenia
- †Lingula
- †Lingulella
- †Lithostrotion
- †Margaretia
- †Martinia
- †Micromitra
- †Monograptus
  - †Monograptus convolutus
- †Morania
- †Naticopsis
- †Neospirifer
- †Niobe – tentative report
- †Obolus
- †Ogygopsis
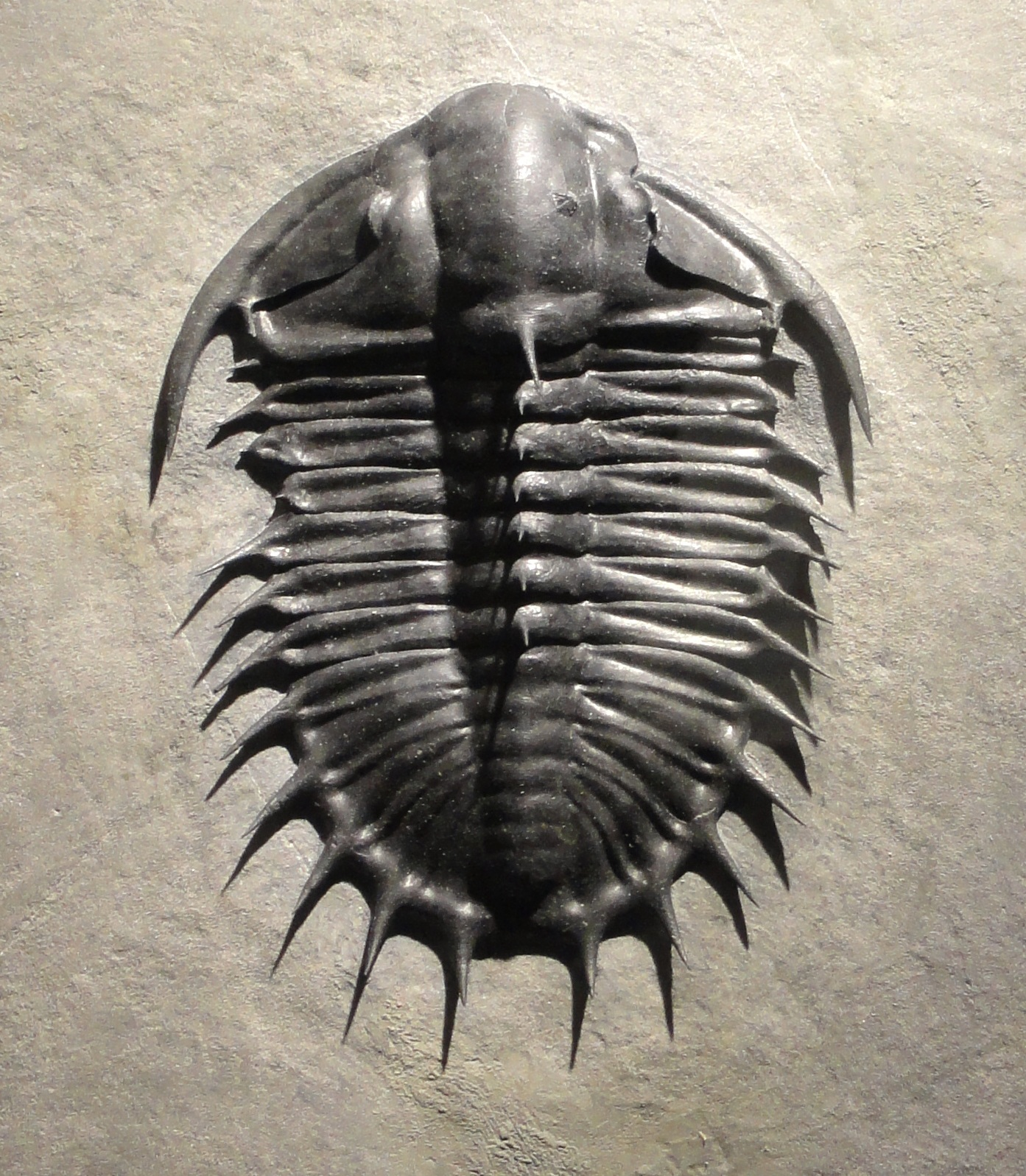
- Fossil of the Cambrian trilobite Olenoides
  †Olenoides
- †Orthotheca
- †Oryctocephalus
- †Pagetia
- Palaeoaplysina
- †Paterina
- †Pelagiella
- †Peronopsis
- †Phyllograptus
- †Plaesiomys
- †Platyceras
- †Platycrinites
- †Platystrophia
- †Poulsenia
- †Prodentalium
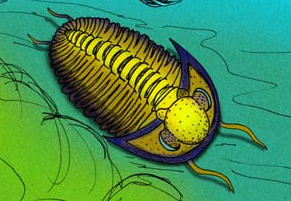
- Restoration of the Silurian trilobite Proetus
  †Proetus
- †Protopliomerella
- †Protospongia
- †Quadratia
- †Selkirkia
- †Siphonodendron
- †Spirifer
  - †Spirifer brazerianus
- †Spiriferina
- †Strophomena
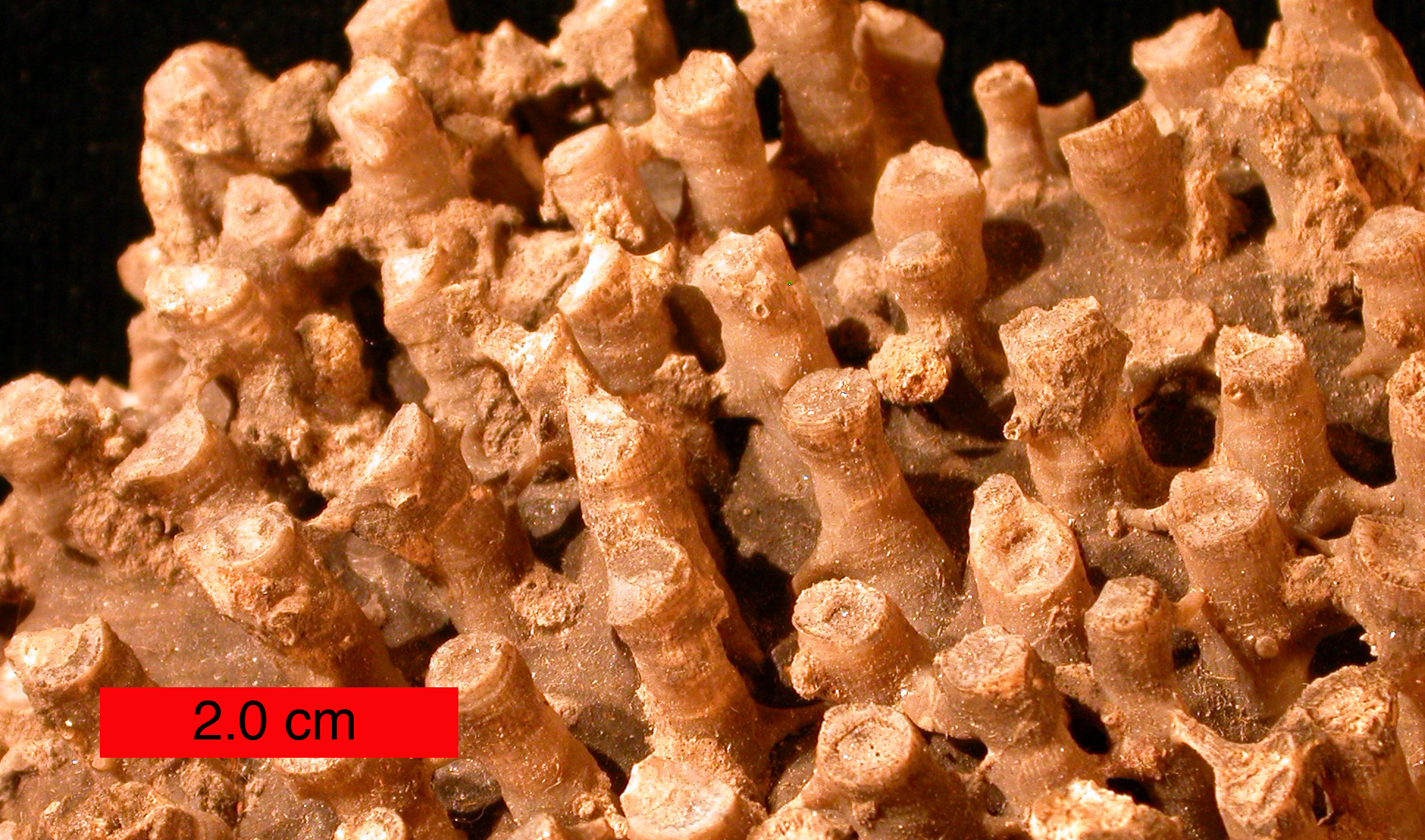
- Fossil of the Devonian tabulate coral Syringopora
  †Syringopora
- †Tetragraptus
- †Tetrataxis
- †Thoracocare
- †Urotheca
- †Wilkingia
- †Worthenia – tentative report
- †Zacanthoides

== Mesozoic ==
=== Selected Mesozoic taxa of Idaho ===
- †Albanites
- †Anaflemingites
- †Anasibirites
- †Anemia
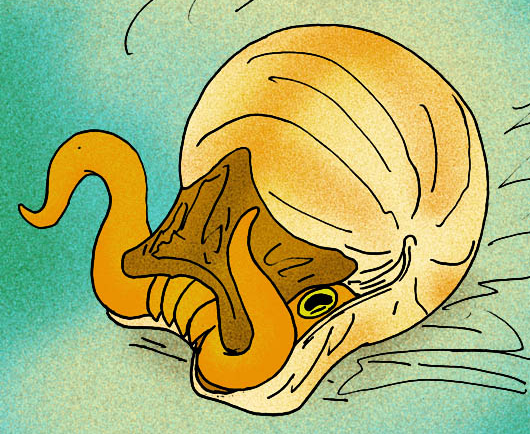
- Life restoration of two species of the Late Triassic ammonoid cephalopod Arcestes
  †Arcestes – tentative report
- †Arctomeekoceras
- †Aspenites
- Astarte
- †Aviculopecten – report made of unidentified related form or using admittedly obsolete nomenclature
  - †Aviculopecten altus – type locality for species
  - †Aviculopecten idahoensis
  - †Aviculopecten pealei – type locality for species
- †Carteria – type locality for genus
- †Ceccaisculitoides
  - †Ceccaisculitoides hammondi
- Chlamys
- †Claraia
  - †Claraia stachei
- Corbicula
- †Cryptaulax
- †Cycadeoidea
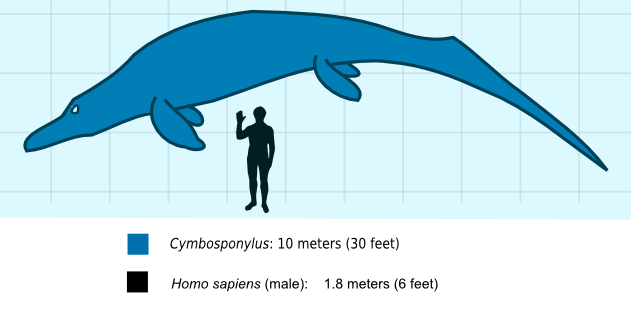
- Diagram illustrating the Middle-Late Triassic ichthyosaur Cymbospondylus with an anachronistic human to scale.
  †Cymbospondylus
- †Dagnoceras
- †Dennstaedtia – tentative report
- †Enoploceras
- †Flemingites
- †Germanonautilus
- †Gervillia – report made of unidentified related form or using admittedly obsolete nomenclature
- Gleichenia
- †Gryphaea
- †Grypoceras
- †Hedenstroemia
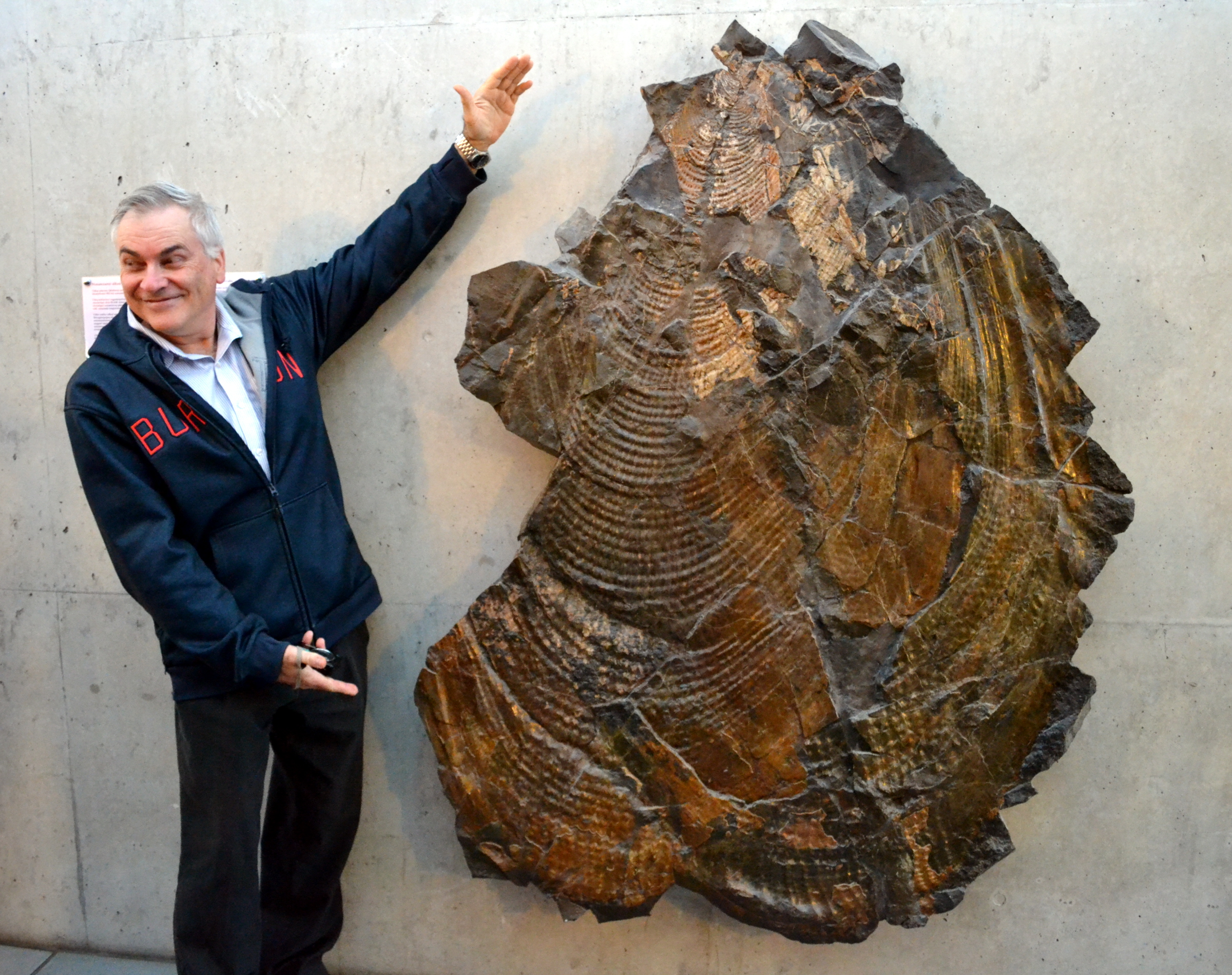
- Fossilized shell of the Early Jurassic-Late Cretaceous marine bivalve Inoceramus with a human indicating its size
  †Inoceramus
- †Inyoites
  - †Inyoites oweni
- †Lecanites
- †Lingula
- Lopha
- †Meekoceras
  - †Meekoceras gracilitatis – type locality for species
- †Megasphaeroceras
- †Naticopsis – tentative report
- †Nemacanthus
  - †Nemacanthus elegans – type locality for species
- †Neogondolella
- †Neospathodus
- †Nerinea
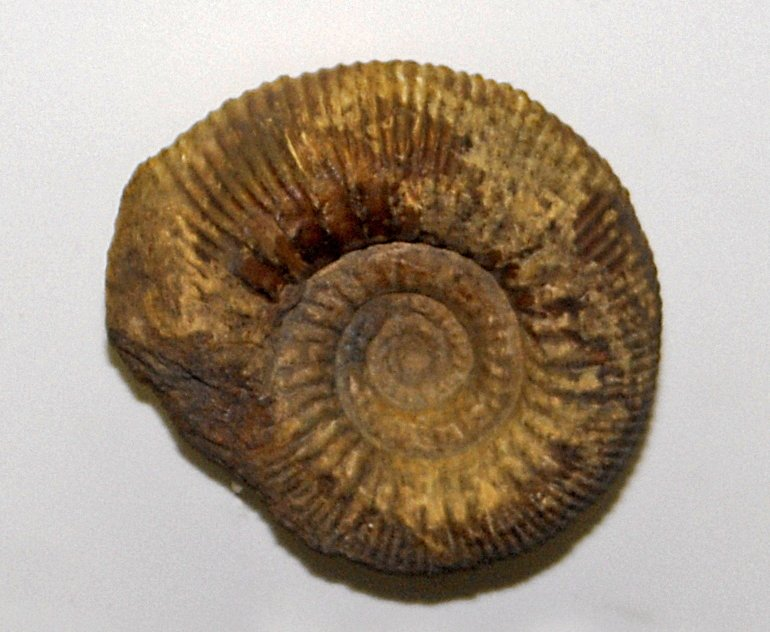
- Fossilized shell of the Middle Jurassic ammonoid cephalopod Normannites
  †Normannites
- †Orthoceras
- Ostrea
- †Owenites
  - †Owenites koeneni – or unidentified comparable form
- †Pagiophyllum
- †Palaeophyllites – tentative report
- †Phaedrysmocheilus
- Pholadomya
  - †Pholadomya inaequiplicata
- †Plagiostoma
- †Platymya
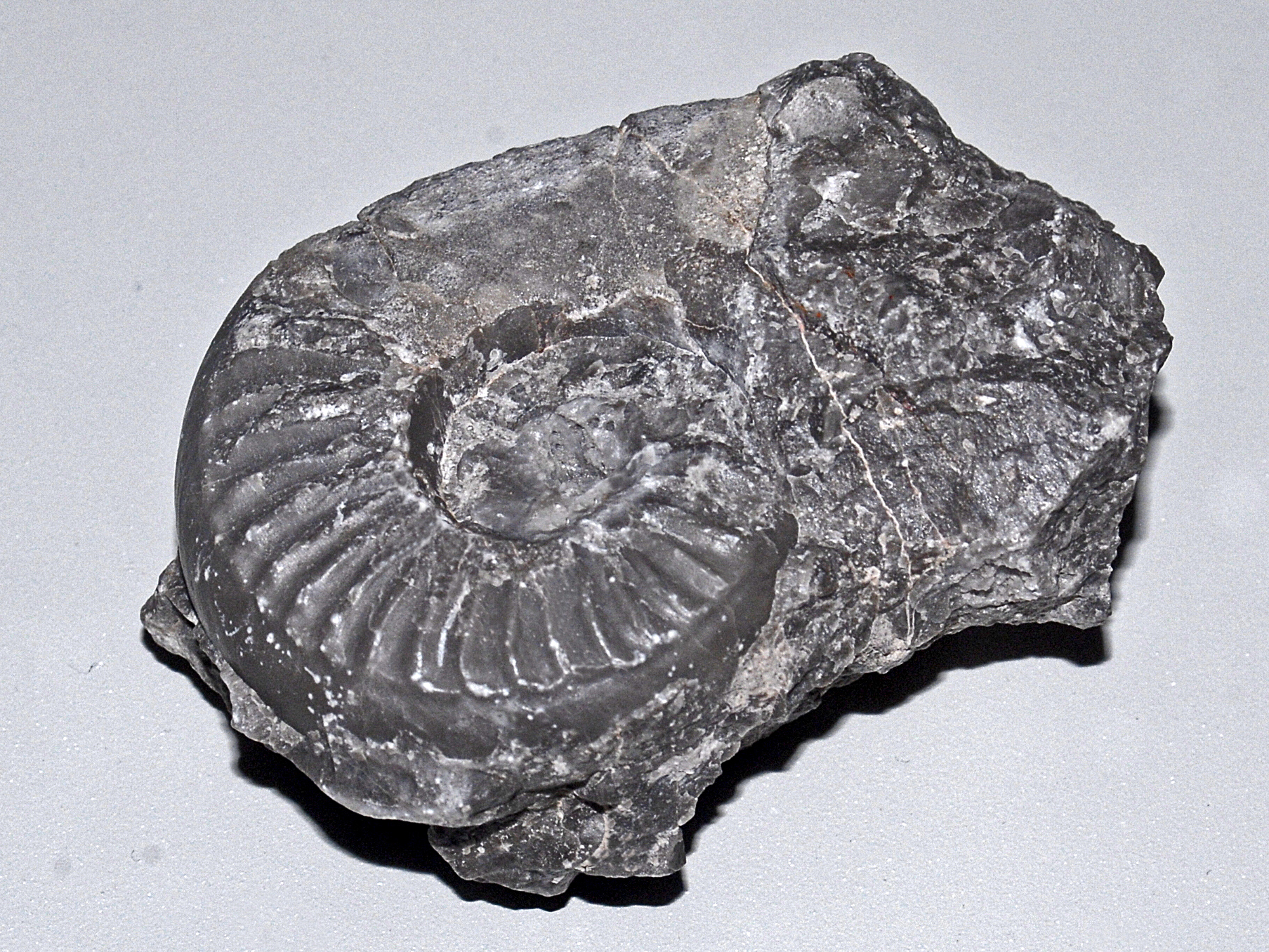
- Fossilized shell of the Carboniferous-Triassic nautiloid cephalopod Pleuronautilus
  †Pleuronautilus
- †Protocardia
- †Pseudomelania – tentative report
- †Pteria – tentative report
- †Rhaetina
- †Rhynchonella – report made of unidentified related form or using admittedly obsolete nomenclature
- †Saurichthys
- †Spiriferina
  - †Spiriferina roundyi
- †Stephanoceras
- †Tempskya
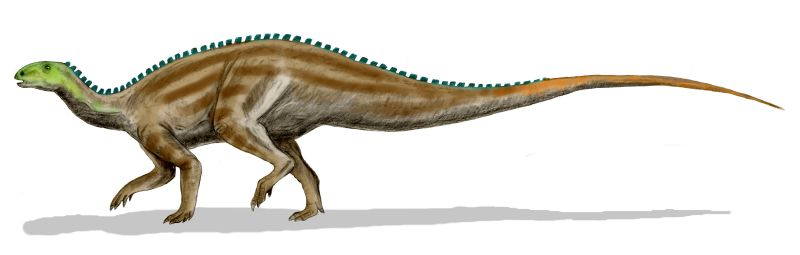
- Life restoration of the Early Cretaceous Iguanodon relative Tenontosaurus
  †Tenontosaurus
- †Thamnasteria
- †Trigonia
  - †Trigonia montanaensis
- †Ussuria
- †Ussurites
- †Vex – type locality for genus
- †Worthenia
- †Wyomingites – type locality for genus
- †Xenoceltites
  - †Xenoceltites cordilleranus
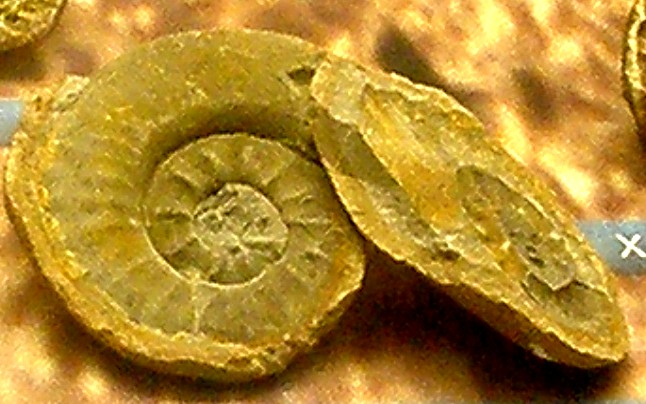
- Fossilized shells of the ammonoid cephalopod Xenodiscus
  †Xenodiscus

== Cenozoic ==
=== Selected Cenozoic taxa of Idaho ===
- Abies
- Acer
- †Acritohippus
  - †Acritohippus isonesus
- †Aepycamelus
- †Aesculus
- Agelaius
  - †Agelaius phoeniceus
- †Agriotherium
- †Alforjas – tentative report
- Alnus
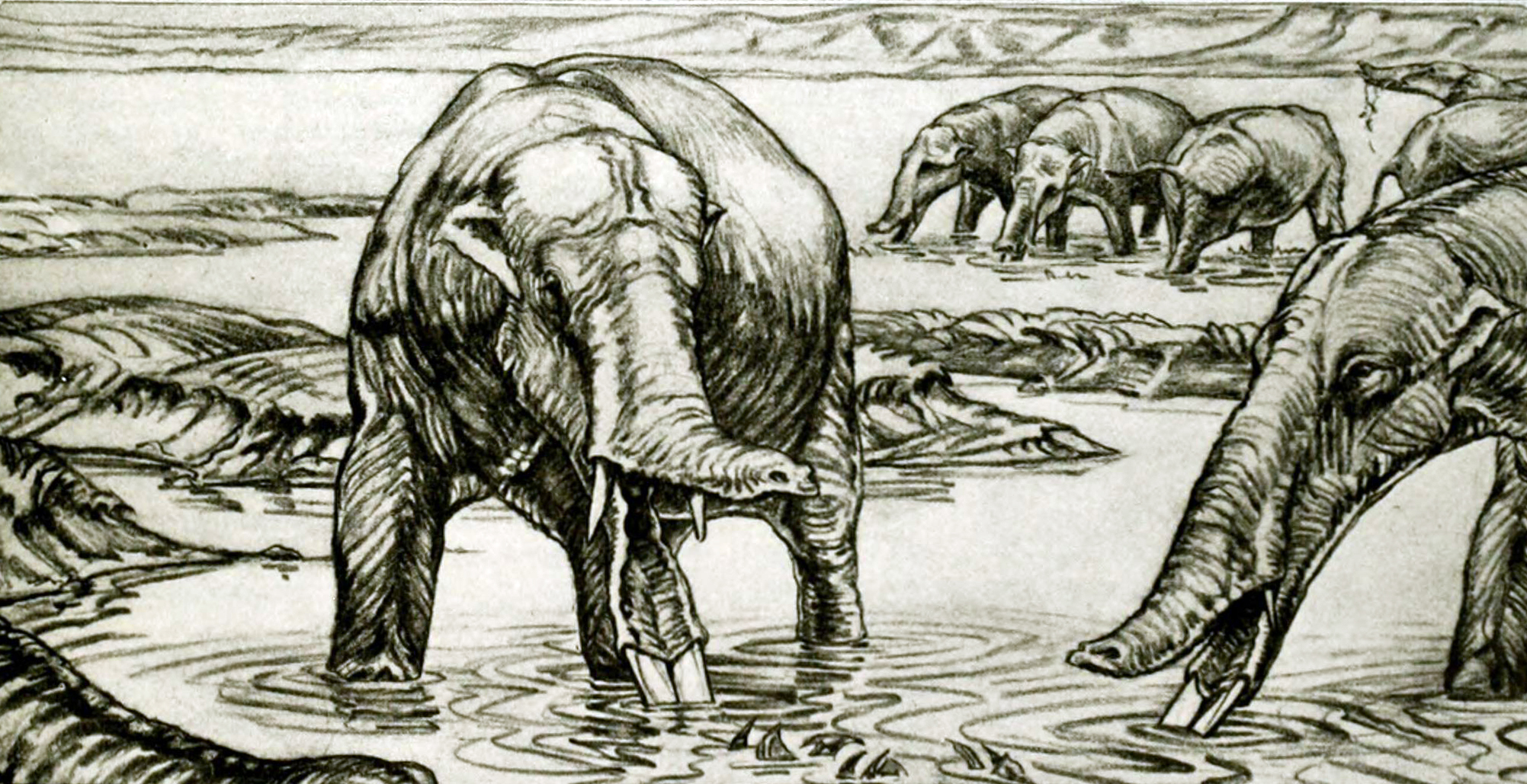
- Life restoration of the Miocene elephant relative Amebelodon. Margret Flinsch (1932).
  †Amebelodon
- Amelanchier
- Anas
  - †Anas platyrhynchos
- Anser
  - †Anser caerulescens
- Antilocapra
  - †Antilocapra americana
- Antrozous
  - †Antrozous pallidus
- †Aphelops
- †Archaeohippus
- †Arctodus
  - †Arctodus simus
- Ardea
  - †Ardea herodias
- Baiomys
- Betula
- Bibio
- Bison
  - †Bison antiquus – or unidentified comparable form
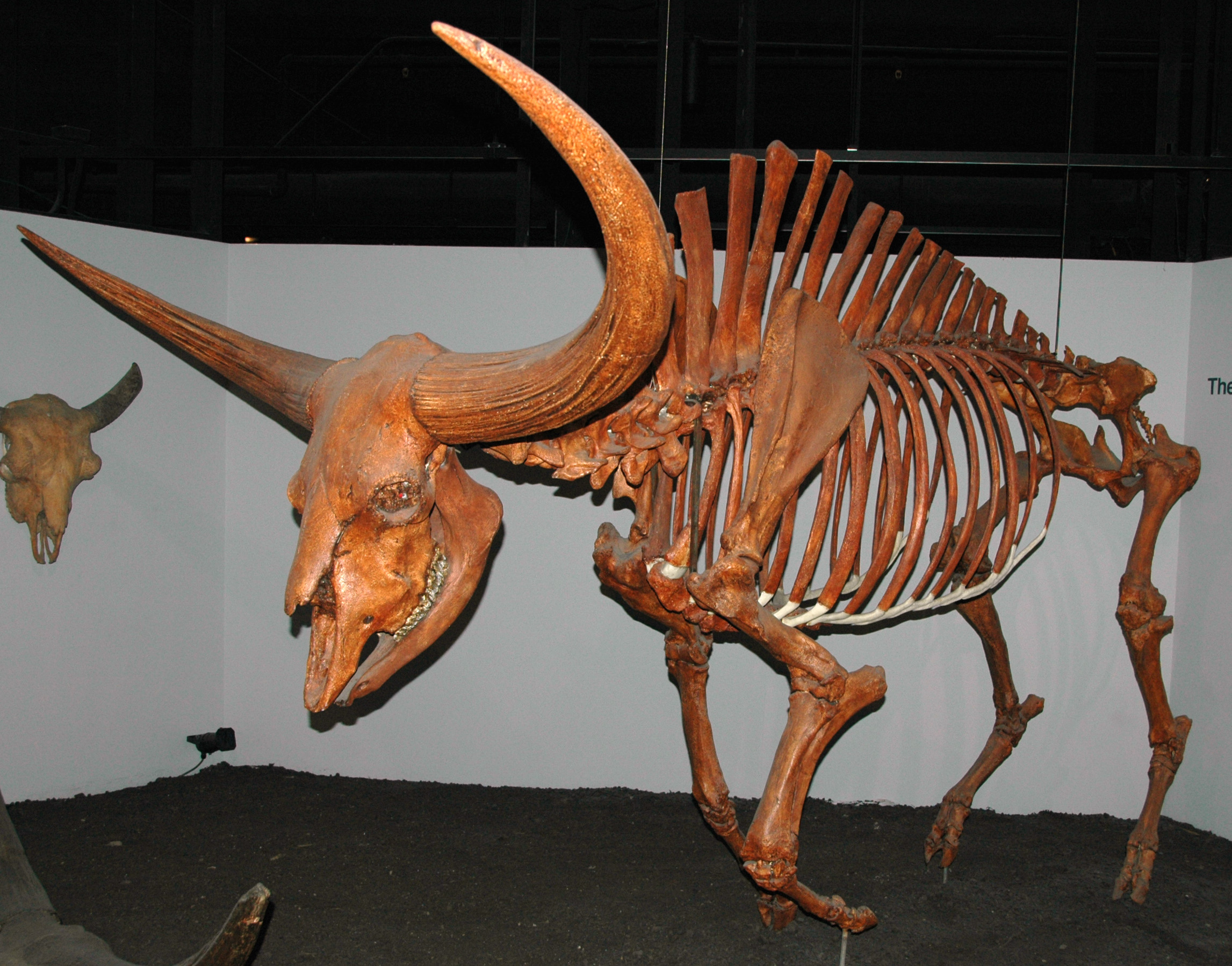
  - Mounted fossilized skeleton of the Pleistocene Bison latifrons, also known as the giant bison or long-horned bison
    †Bison latifrons
  - †Bison priscus
- Boletina
- †Bolitophila
- †Bombus
- Bonasa
  - †Bonasa umbellus
- †Bootherium
  - †Bootherium bombifrons
- †Borophagus
  - †Borophagus diversidens
  - †Borophagus hilli
  - †Borophagus pugnator
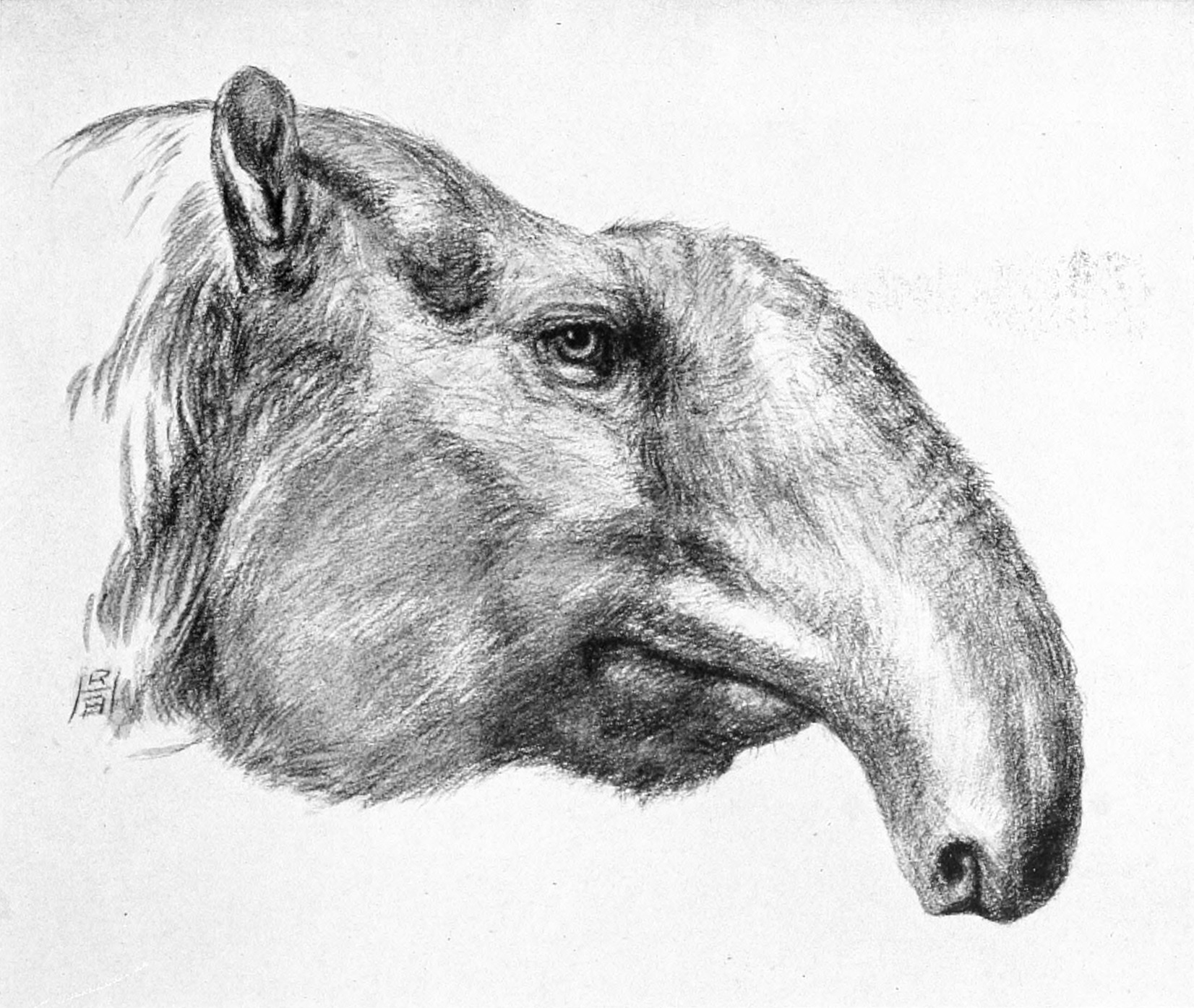
- Restorative portrait of the Miocene oreodont mammal Brachycrus
  †Brachycrus
- Brachylagus
  - †Brachylagus idahoensis
- Branta
  - †Branta canadensis
- Bucephala
- †Camelops
  - †Camelops hesternus
- Camponotus
- Canis
  - †Canis dirus
  - †Canis ferox
  - †Canis latrans
  - †Canis lepophagus
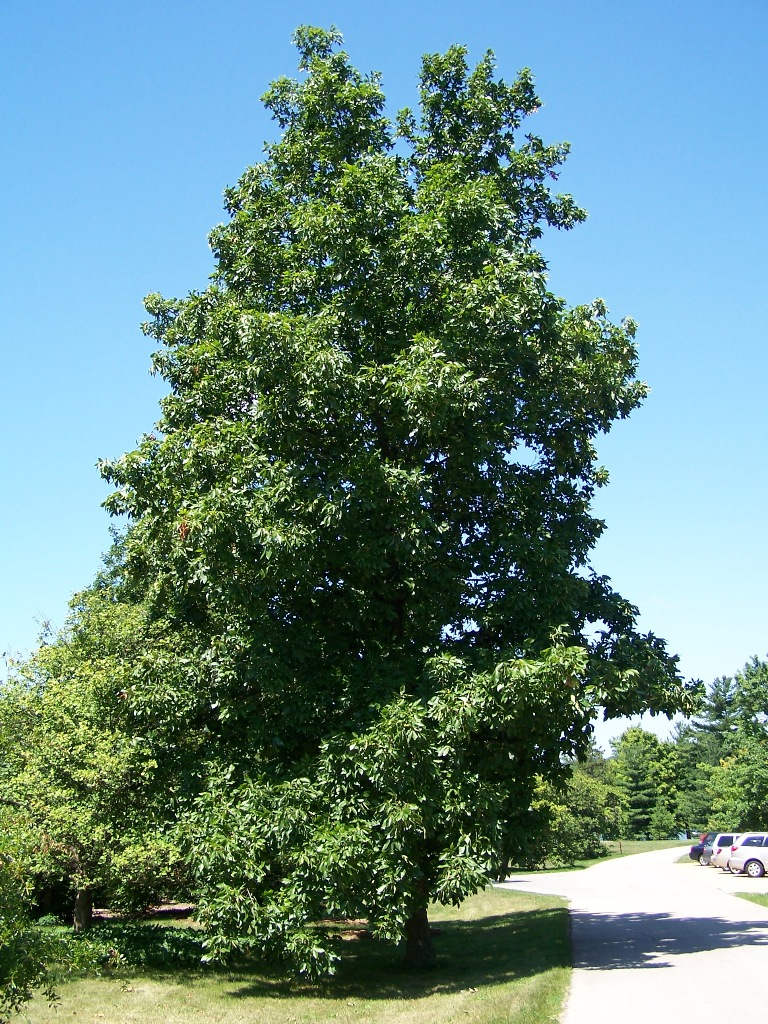
- A living Carya, or hickory tree
  Carya
- Castor
  - †Castor californicus
  - †Castor canadensis
- Ceanothus
- Cedrela
- Cercidiphyllum
- Cervus
  - †Cervus elaphus – or unidentified comparable form
- †Chamaecyparis
- Chen
- †Chrysolepis
- Ciconia – tentative report
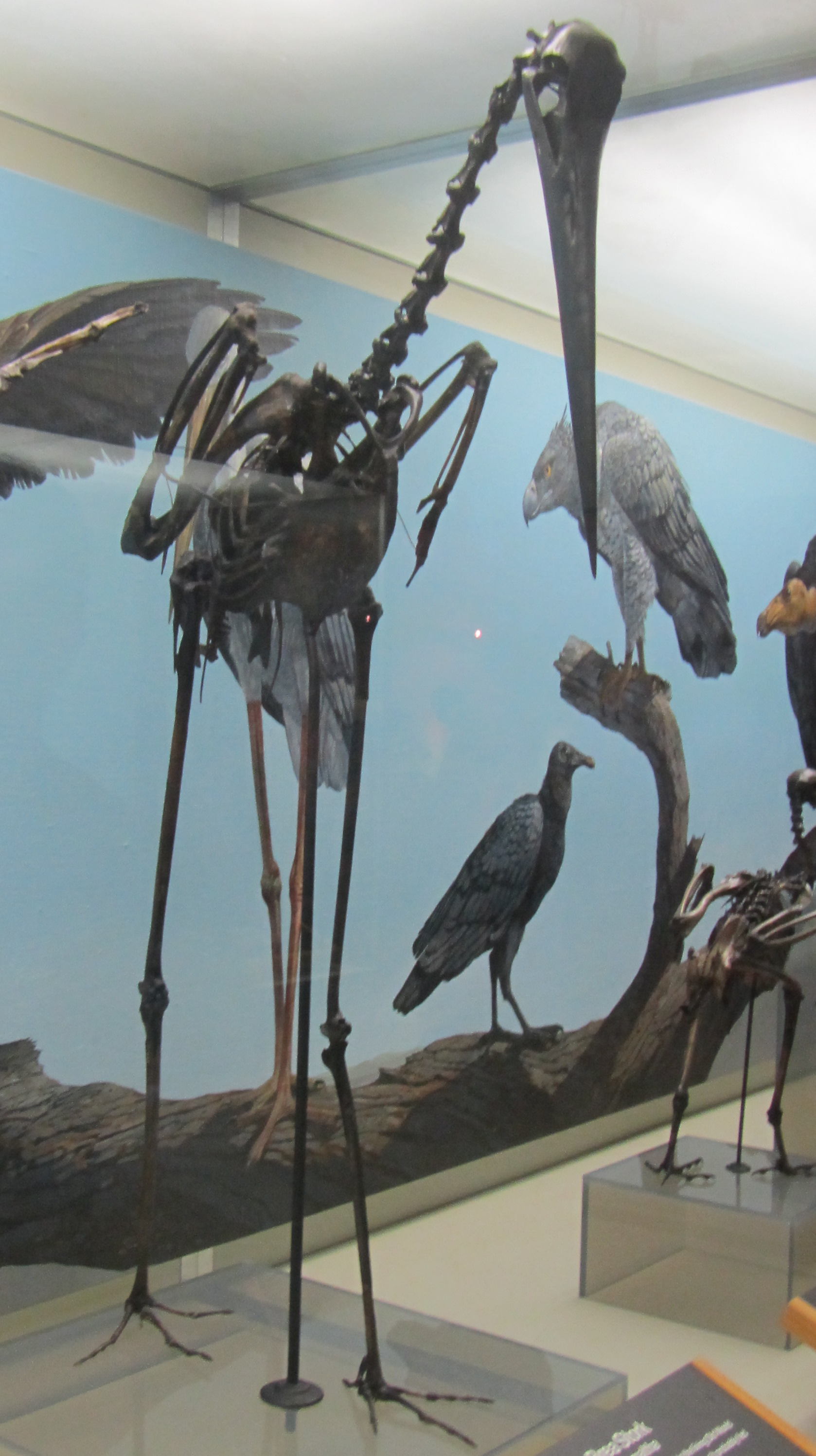
  - Mounted fossilized skeleton of the Pliocene-Pleistocene Ciconia maltha, also known as the asphalt stork or La Brea stork
    †Ciconia maltha
- Comptonia
- Cornus
- †Cosoryx
- Craigia
- Crataegus
- †Cunninghamia
- Cygnus
- Cynomys
- †Dennstaedtia
- †Diceratherium
- †Dipoides
- Dolichoderus
- †Domnina
- †Dromomeryx
- Dytiscus
- Elaphe
  - †Elaphe vulpina
- †Epicyon
  - †Epicyon haydeni
- †Equisetum
- Equus
  - †Equus idahoensis
  - †Equus scotti
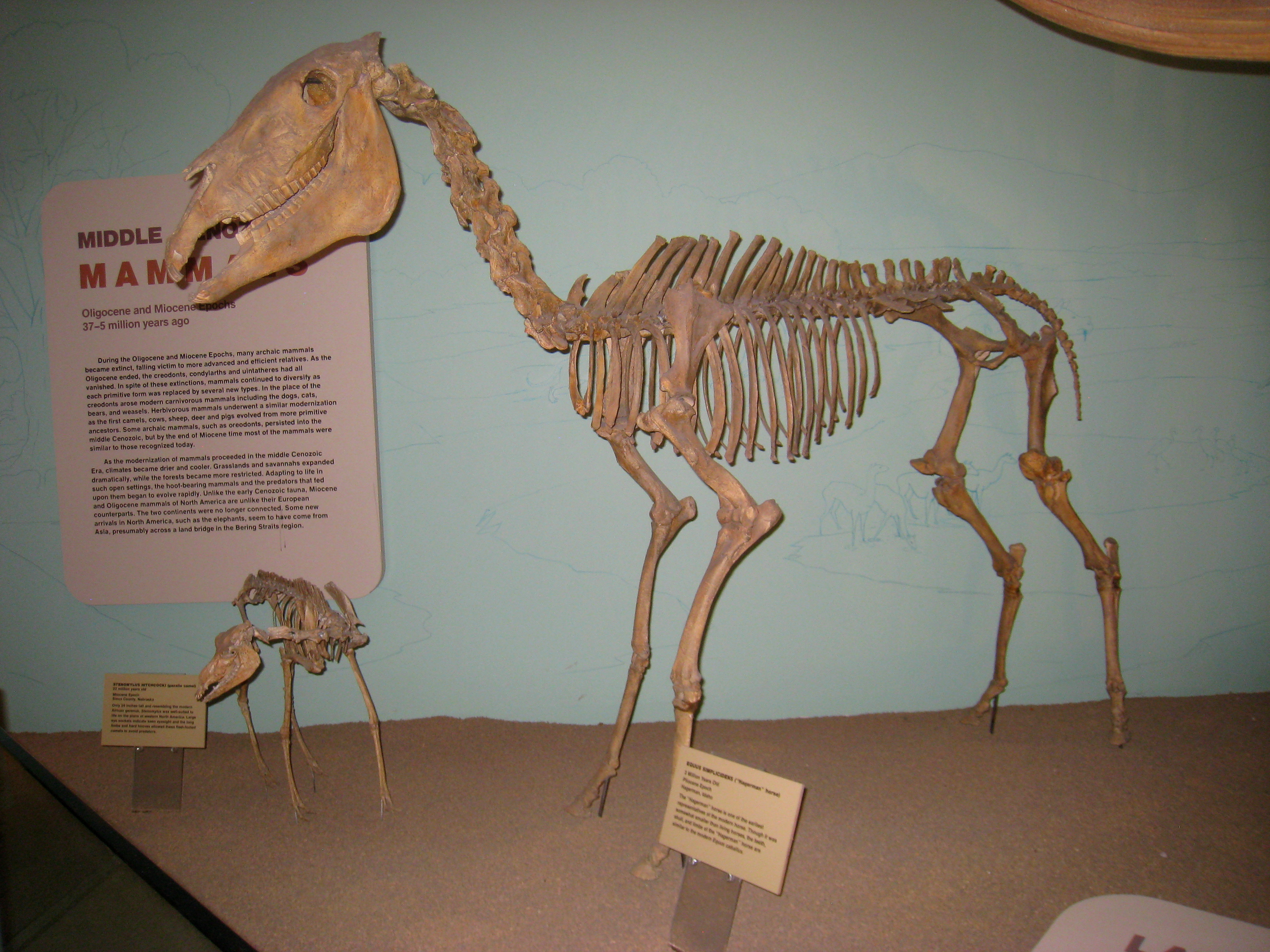
  - Fossilized skeleton of the Pliocene-Pleistocene horse Equus simplicidens, also known as the Hagerman horse or American zebra
    †Equus simplicidens
- Erethizon
  - †Erethizon dorsatum
- †Eucommia
- †Euptelea
- Falco
  - †Falco peregrinus
- Felis
- †Fraxinus
- Gallinula
  - †Gallinula chloropus
- †Garrya
- †Gigantocamelus
- Ginkgo
  - †Ginkgo adiantoides
- †Gleditsia
- Halesia
- †Hemiauchenia
  - †Hemiauchenia macrocephala
- Homo
  - †Homo sapiens
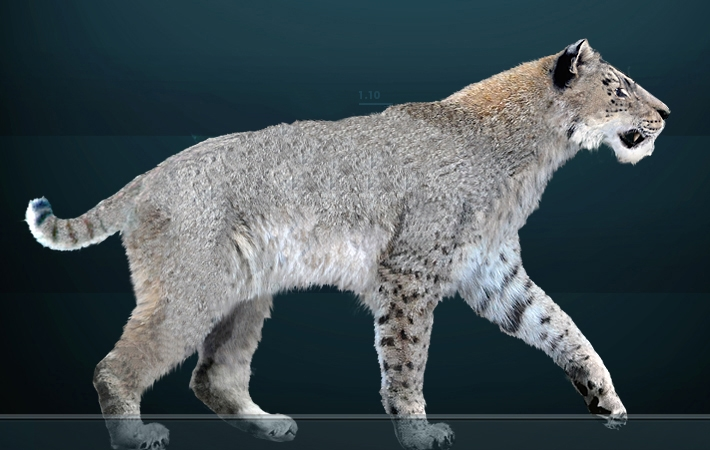
- Restoration of Pliocene-Pleistocene Homotherium, or scimitar cat
  †Homotherium
  - †Homotherium serum
- Hydrangea
- †Hypohippus
- †Hypolagus
- Ilex
- Juglans
- Larix
- Lasiurus
- Lasius
- †Ledum
- Lepus
- Libocedrus
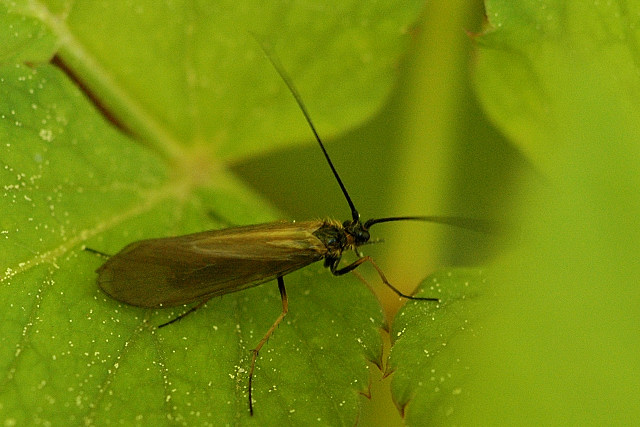
- A living Limnephilus caddisfly
  †Limnephilus
- †Liriodendron
- †Lithocarpus
- Lontra
  - †Lontra canadensis
- Lynx
  - †Lynx canadensis
  - †Lynx rufus
- †Macrophya
- Mahonia
- †Mammut
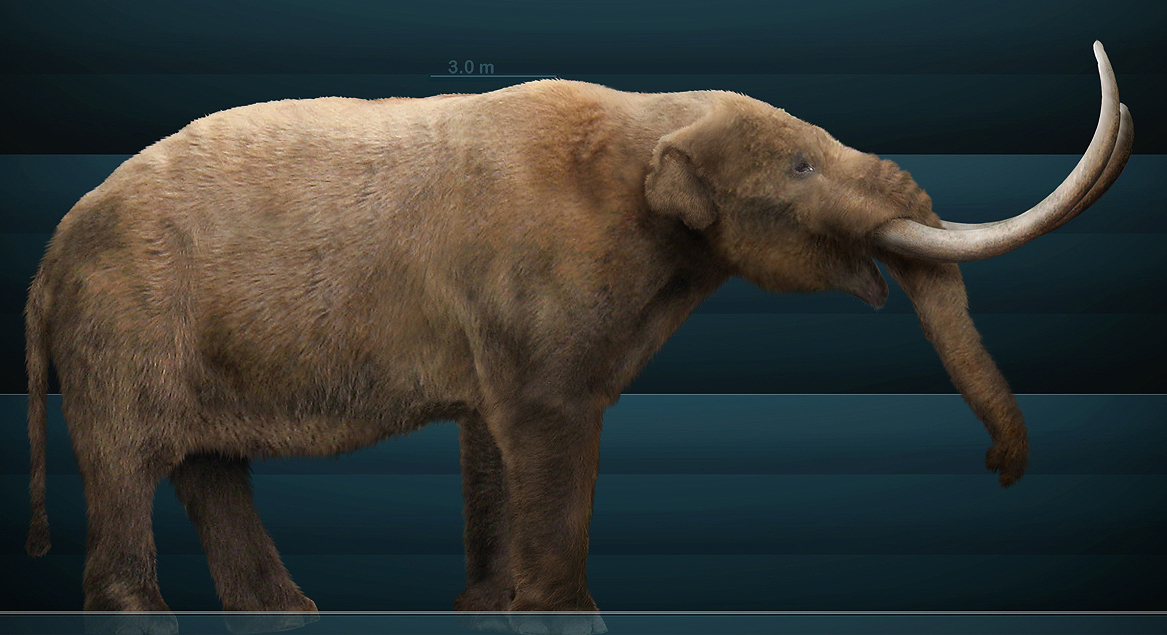
  - Restoration of a Mammut americanum, or American mastodon
    †Mammut americanum
- †Mammuthus
  - †Mammuthus columbi
- †Megacamelus
- †Megalonyx
  - †Megalonyx jeffersonii
  - †Megalonyx leptostomus
- †Megantereon
- Meleagris
  - †Meleagris gallopavo
- Mergus
  - †Mergus merganser
- †Merychyus
- †Mesoreodon
- Messor – tentative report
- †Metalopex
- Metasequoia
  - †Metasequoia occidentalis
- †Michenia
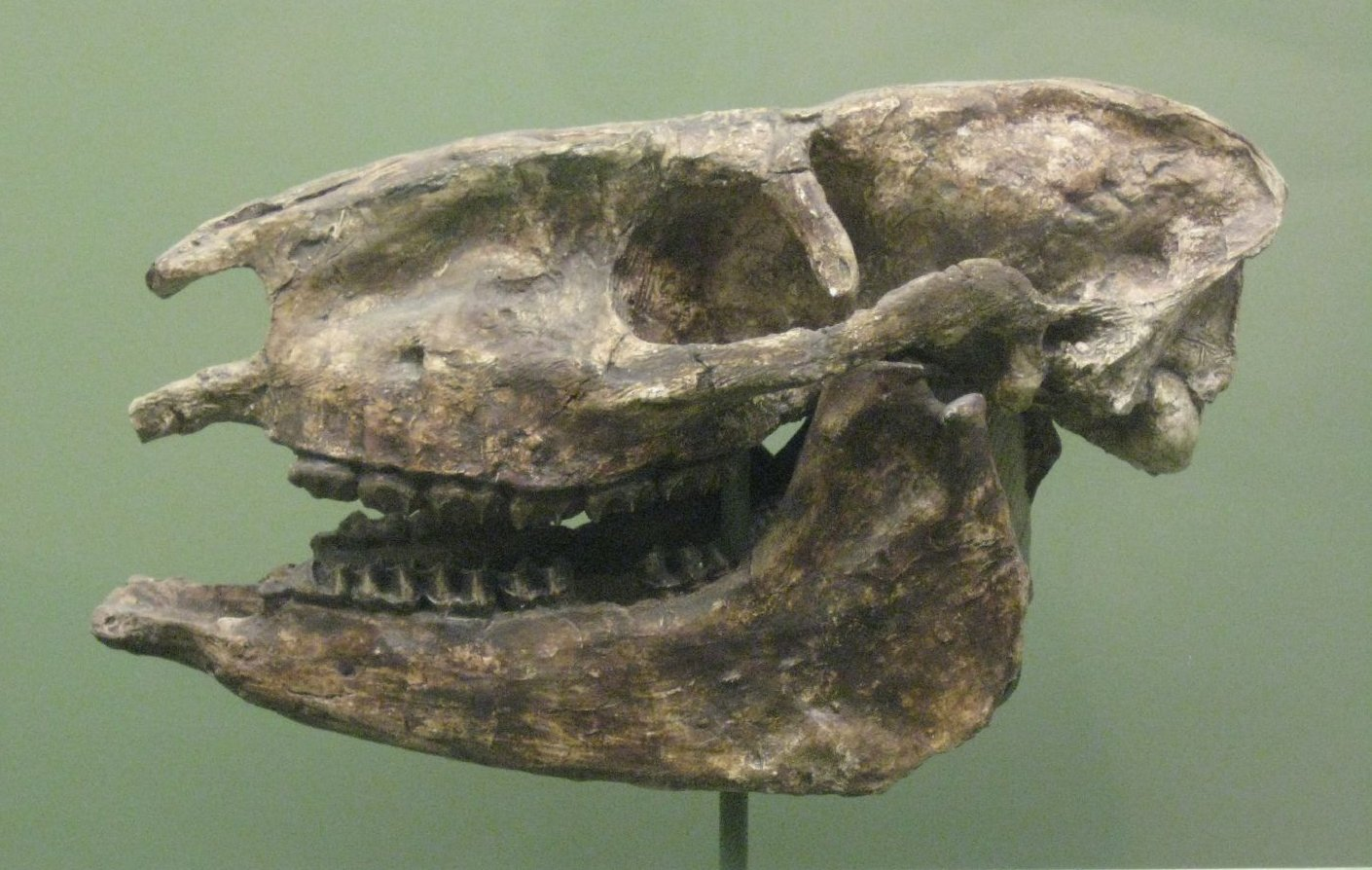
- Fossilized skull of the Eocene-Oligocene three-toed horse Miohippus
  †Miohippus
- Mustela
- Natrix
- Neophrontops
- Neotoma
- †Niglarodon
- †Nyssa
- Odocoileus
- Ondatra
  - †Ondatra zibethicus
- †Osmunda
- Ostrya
- †Oxydactylus
- †Palaeolagus – tentative report
- Panthera
  - †Panthera leo
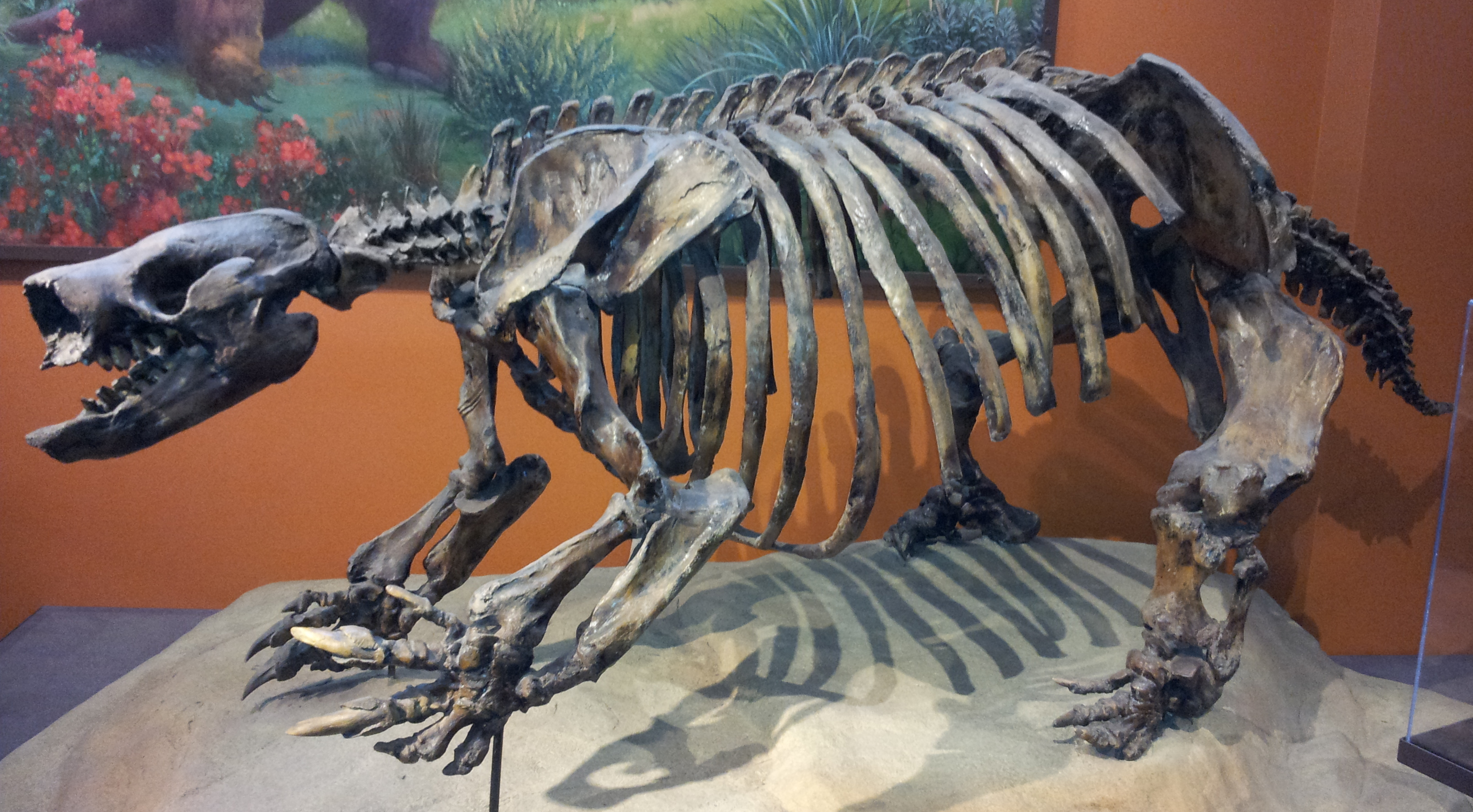
- Fossilized skeleton of the Pliocene-Pleistocene ground sloth Paramylodon
  †Paramylodon
  - †Paramylodon harlani
- †Parthenocissus
- Pelecanus
  - †Pelecanus halieus – type locality for species
- Perognathus
- Peromyscus
- Persea
- Phalacrocorax
  - †Phalacrocorax auritus
- Phenacomys
- Phryganea
- Picea
- Pinus
- Platanus
- †Platygonus
- Populus
- Porzana
- †Potamogeton
- †Procastoroides
- Procyon
  - †Procyon lotor
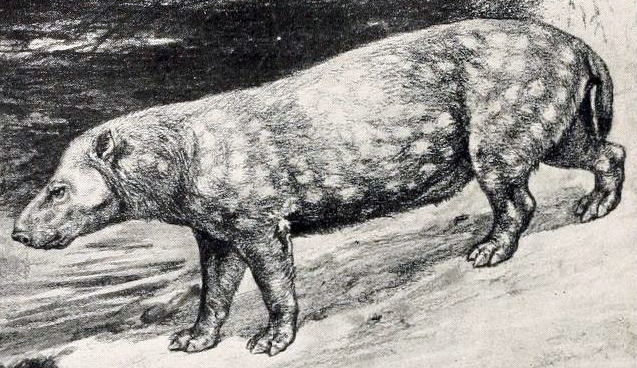
- Restoration of the Miocene hippopotamus-like oreodont Promerycochoerus both onshore and in the water. Robert Bruce Horsfall (1913).
  †Promerycochoerus
- †Protolabis
- Prunus
- †Pseudolarix
- †Pseudotsuga
- Pterocarya
- Puma
  - †Puma concolor
- Quercus
- Querquedula
- Rangifer
  - †Rangifer tarandus
- †Rhamnus
- Rhododendron
- Rhus
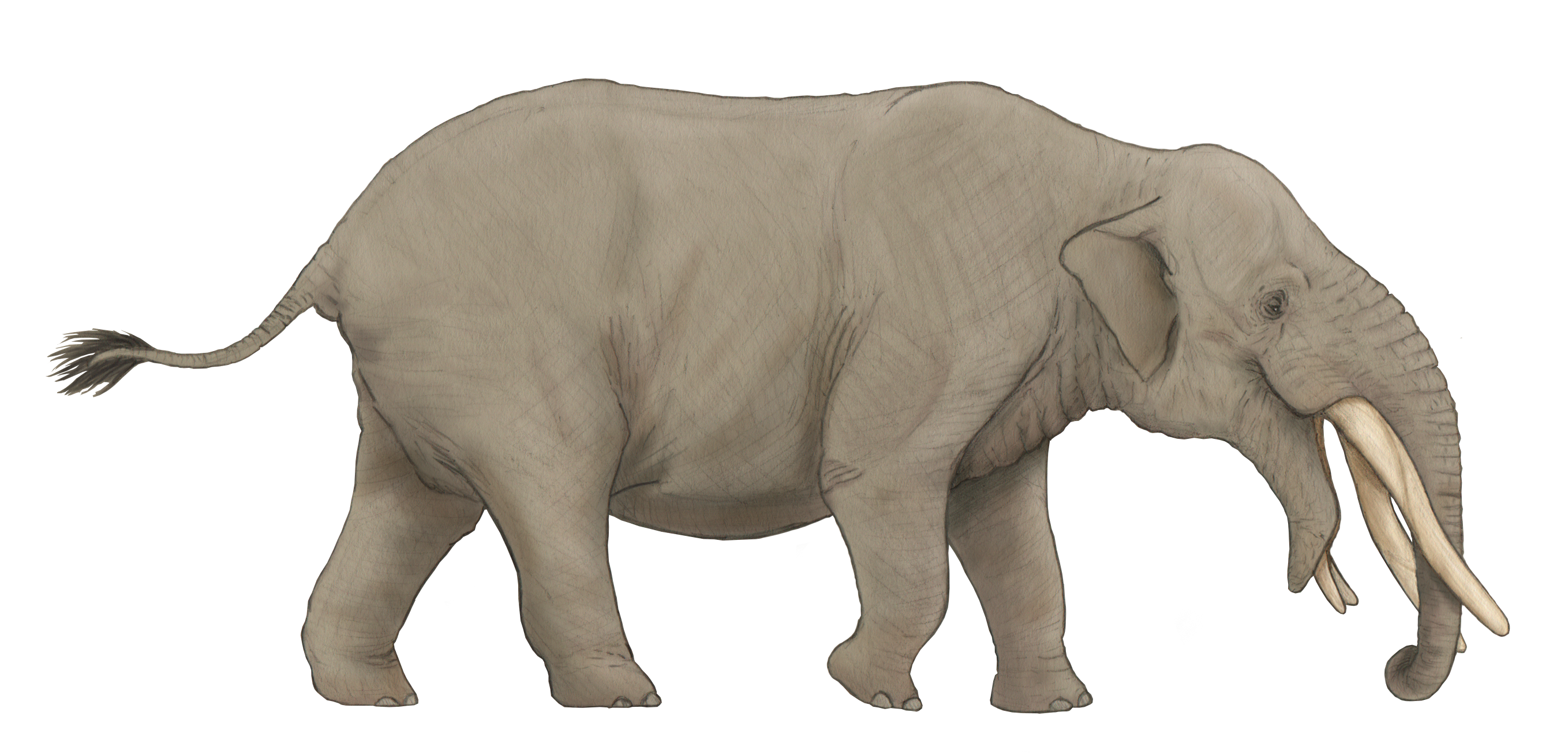
- Restoration of the Miocene-Pliocene elephant relative Rhynchotherium
  †Rhynchotherium
- †Ribes
- Rosa
- Salix
- Sassafras
- †Satherium
  - †Satherium piscinarium
- Scapanus
  - †Scapanus townsendii – or unidentified related form
- Sciara
- Sequoia
  - †Sequoia affinis
- †Sequoiadendron
  - †Sequoiadendron chaneyi
- †Simocyon
- †Smilax
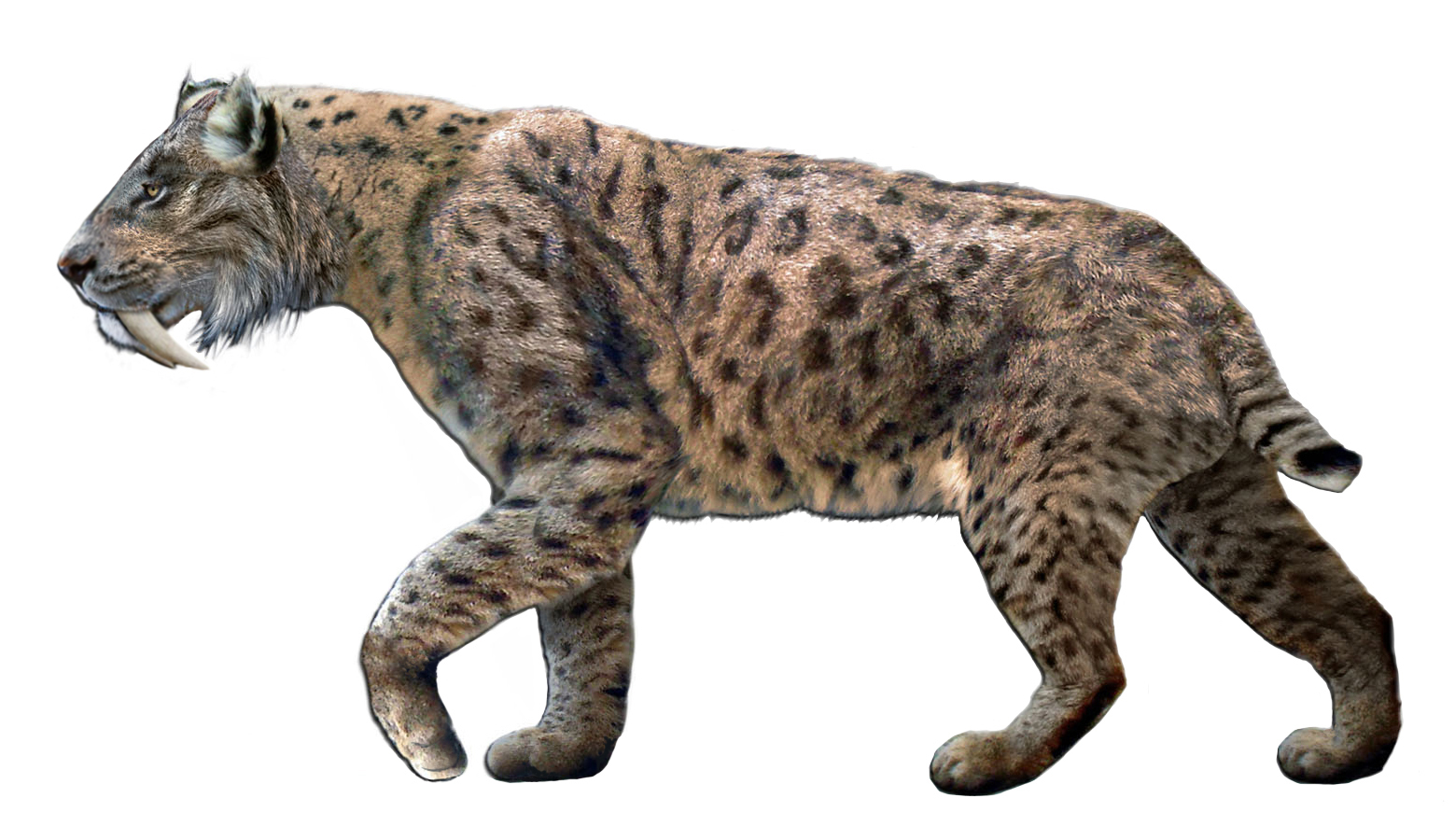
- Life restoration of the Pleistocene-Holocene saber-tooth cat Smilodon
  †Smilodon
  - †Smilodon fatalis
- †Sophora
- †Sorbus
- Sorex
  - †Sorex palustris
- Spermophilus
- †Spiraea
- †Stegomastodon
  - †Stegomastodon mirificus
- Sthenictis
- †Symphoricarpos
- Taxidea
  - †Taxidea taxus
- Taxodium
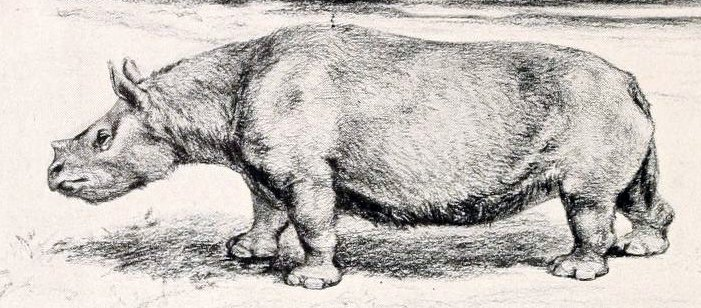
- Restoration of the Miocene-Pliocene rhinoceros Teleoceras
  †Teleoceras
- Thamnophis
- Thomomys
  - †Thomomys townsendii
- †Thuja
- †Ticholeptus
- Tilia
  - †Trigonictis macrodon
- †Tsuga
- Typha
- Ulmus
- †Ungnadia
- Ursus
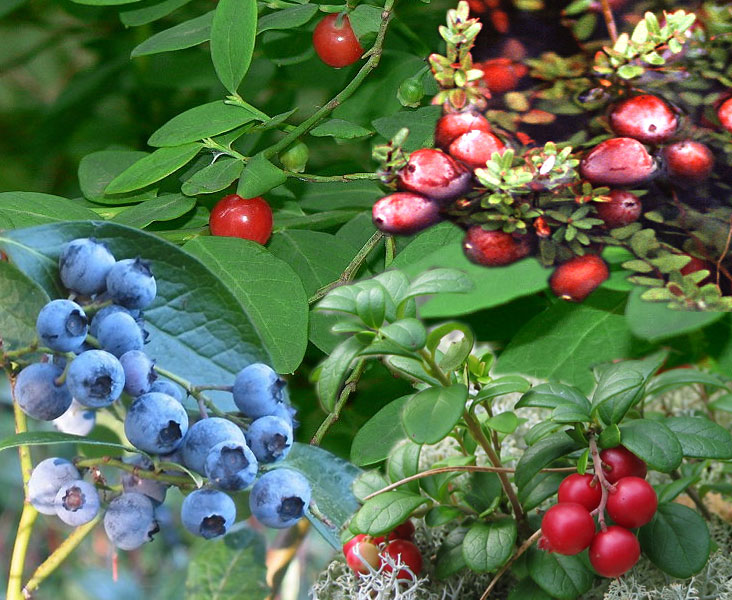
- A variety of modern Vaccinium species, clockwise from top right: cranberries, lingonberries, blueberries, and huckleberries
  †Vaccinium
- †Vauquelinia
- Vulpes
  - †Vulpes vulpes
- Zelkova
