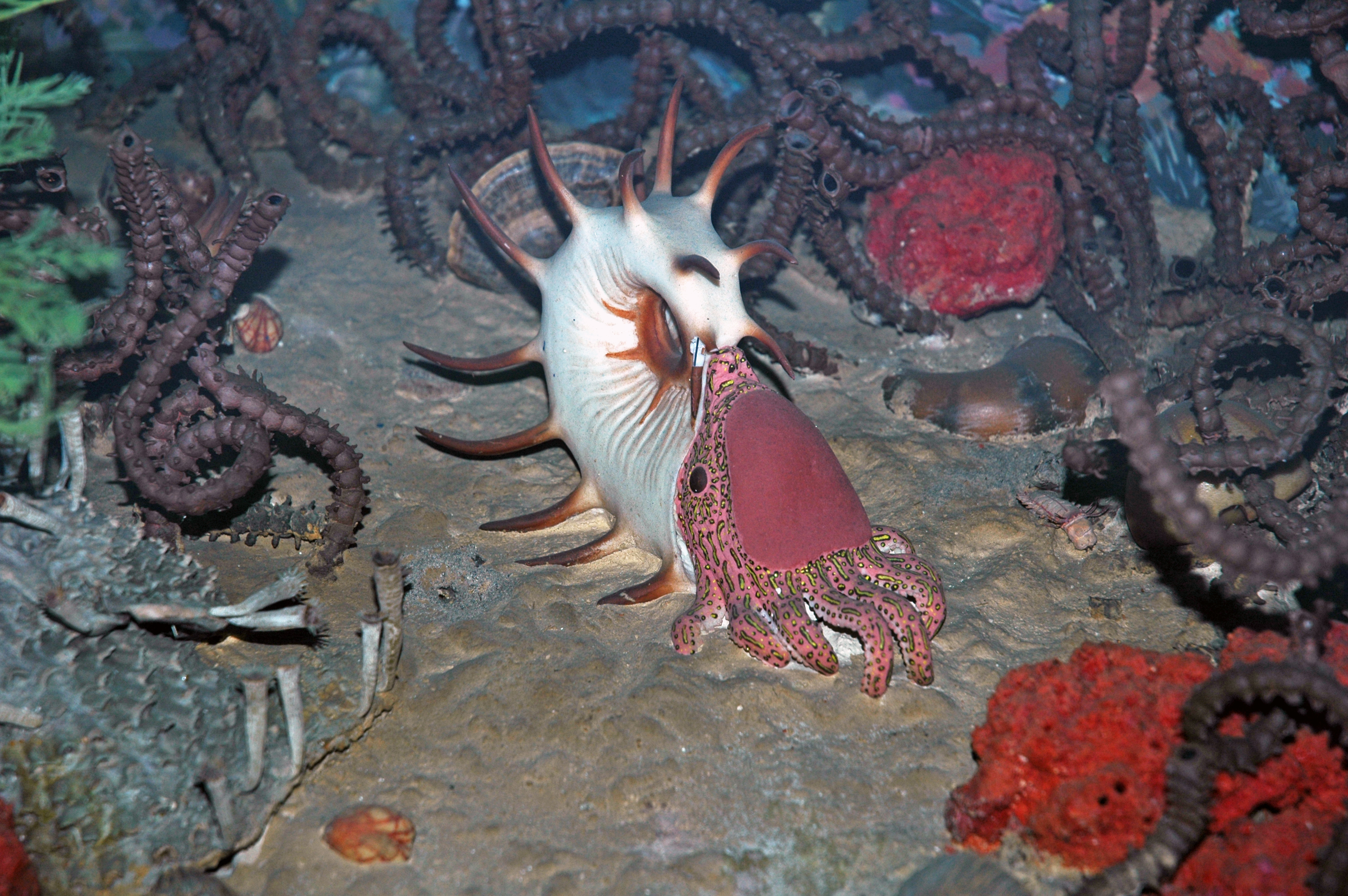
- Reconstruction of C. texanum at Carnegie Museum of Natural History

Scientific classification
- Kingdom: Animalia
- Phylum: Mollusca
- Class: Cephalopoda
- Subclass: Nautiloidea
- Order: Nautilida
- Family: †Tainoceratidae
- Genus: †Cooperoceras; Miller, 1945

Type species
- †Cooperoceras texanum Miller, 1945

Species
- C. texanum Miller, 1945; C. milleri Tucker, 1977

= Cooperoceras =

Cooperoceras Temporal range: Upper Pennsylvanian – Cisuralian

Extinct genus of cephalopods

Cooperoceras is an extinct genus of nautilid cephalopods within the family Tainoceratidae. Its most characteristic trait is the presence of long paired hollow spines on its outer sides, which is one of the most extreme forms of shell ornamentation in nautiloids. It lived from the Upper Carboniferous to the Lower Permian and its fossils have been found in North America and Europe.

== Description ==
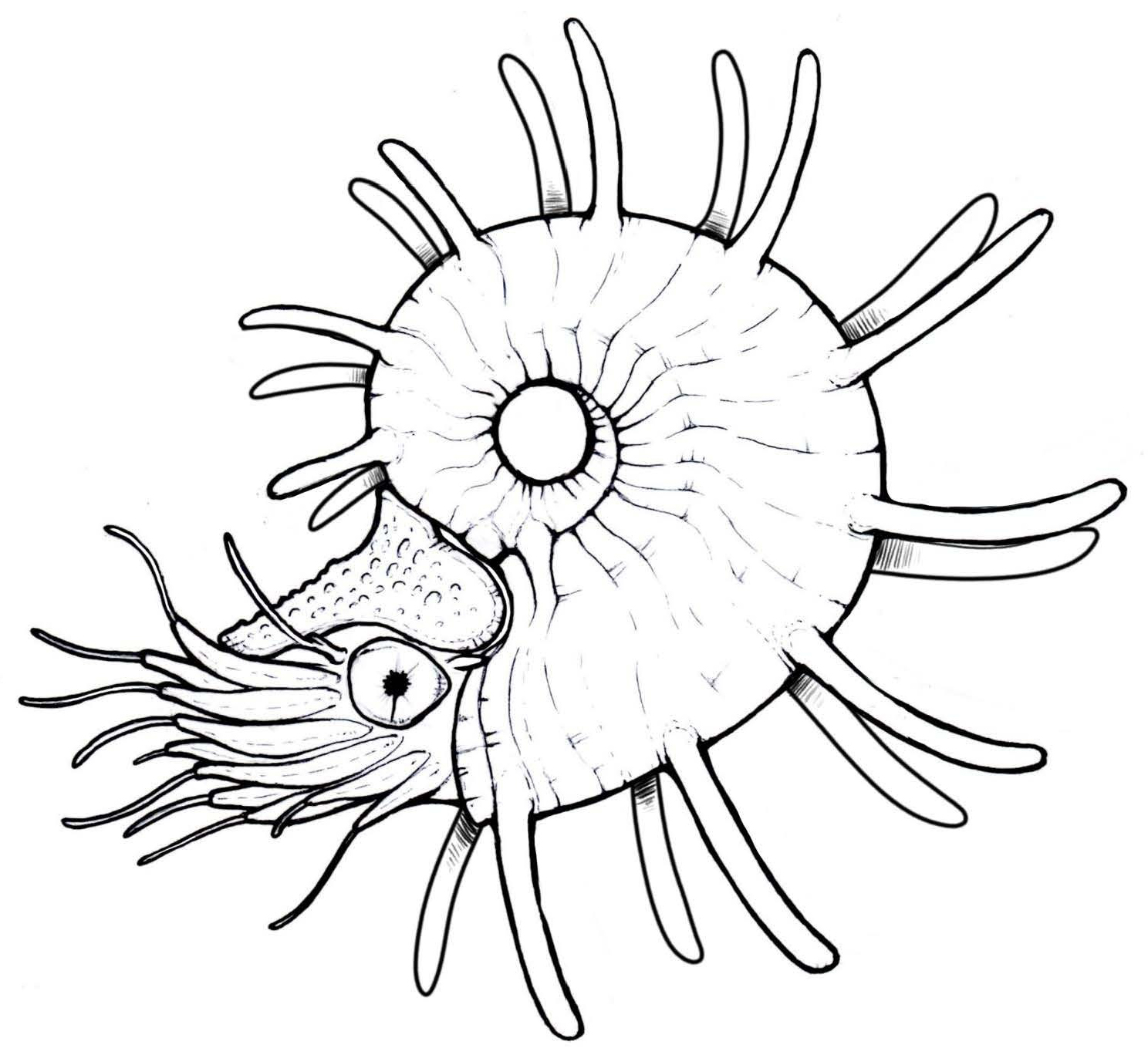
Life restoration

The shell is evolute, with an open umbilicus and sinuous ribs at maturity. The flanks and venter are flattened. The flanks converge on the dorsum. The venter has a shallow median groove and carries long paired ventrolateral spines that are widely spaced and recurve posteriorly. The sutures form shallow rounded ventral and lateral lobes. The siphuncle is small, tubular, and subcentral.

== Classification ==
Cooperoceras belongs to the Tainoceratidae, a diverse family of late Paleozoic to Triassic coiled nautilids. The genus may be descended from or share a common ancestor with Metacoceras, another Carboniferous tainoceratid with shorter spines. Only two species are currently recognized as belonging to the genus Cooperoceras, C. texanum and C. milleri; an additional tentatively referred species, C.? spinosum, is likely only distantly related.

== Ecology ==
The long ventrolateral spines may have acted as protection against predators. They show strong signs of wear in the last third of the mature whorl, suggesting that Cooperoceras was nektobenthic and moved close to the seafloor.
