= Encoiloceras =

Encoiloceras Temporal range: Carnian

Scientific classification
- Kingdom: Animalia
- Phylum: Mollusca
- Class: Cephalopoda
- Subclass: Nautiloidea
- Order: Nautilida
- Family: †Tainoceratidae
- Genus: †Encoiloceras; Hyatt in Zittel, 1900

Extinct genus of molluscs

Encoiloceras is a genus of Tainoceratids, a nautiloid cephalopod in the order Nautilida that has been found in Upper Triassic (Carnian) sediments in the Alps and Hungary.

Encoiloceras has an evolute shell with a wide umbilicus and large umbilical perforation in the middle. The whorl section is subquadrate with a rounded venter. Flanks bear thick, foldlike, ribs that thicken at the ventral shoulders. The suture has shallow lobes on all sides and the supuncle is close to the dorsum, i.e. to the inner rim.

Encoiloceras is similar to Anoploceras in that both have pronounced ribbing, although stronger in Encoiloceras, but differs in that Encoiloceras has a wide umbilical perforation, lacking in Anoploceras. It is also similar to Enoploceras in that Enoploceras also has an umbilical perforation, although smaller, and lacks the strong ribbing of Encoiloceras.
