= Holconautilus =

Holconautilus Temporal range: Upper Triassic

Scientific classification
- Kingdom: Animalia
- Phylum: Mollusca
- Class: Cephalopoda
- Subclass: Nautiloidea
- Order: Nautilida
- Family: †Tainoceratidae
- Genus: †Holconautilus; Mojsisovics, 1902

Extinct genus of molluscs

Holconautilus is a genus of nautiloids from the family Tainoceratidae and order Nautilida, named by Mojsisovics, 1902, and known from Upper Triassic sediments in Europe and E Indies (Timor). Its shell, evolute, discoidal, with simple coarse lateral ribbing; whorl section, subrectagular with a broadly arched venter.

Holconautilus somewhat resembles the Permo-Triassic Pleuronautilus except its suture has ventral saddles instead of ventral lobes and lateral ribs are continuous. Anoploceras, from the same time and place as Holconautilus is also similar except for having a wider whorl section and a venter that is slightly concave.
