= Anoploceras =

Anoploceras Temporal range: Middle Triassic– Upper Triassic

Scientific classification
- Kingdom: Animalia
- Phylum: Mollusca
- Class: Cephalopoda
- Subclass: Nautiloidea
- Order: Nautilida
- Family: †Tainoceratidae
- Genus: †Anoploceras; Hyatt in Zittel, 1900

Extinct genus of molluscs

Anoploceras is a genus of Middle and Upper Triassic nautiloids included in the Tainoceratidae, known from eastern Europe. The shell is evolute with only a slight overlap of previous whorls. Whorl section is subquadrate, like Pleuronautilus, only depressed. Flanks have conspicuous ribs that may be somewhat sinuous.

Holconautilus has a more rounded venter, and flanks, and is more evolute. Enoploceras has weaker ribs that expand into nodes on the umbilical and ventro-lateral shoulders, and a small umbilical perforation. Encoiloceras has strong ribbing, a large umbilical perforation, and a shallow groove along the venter.
