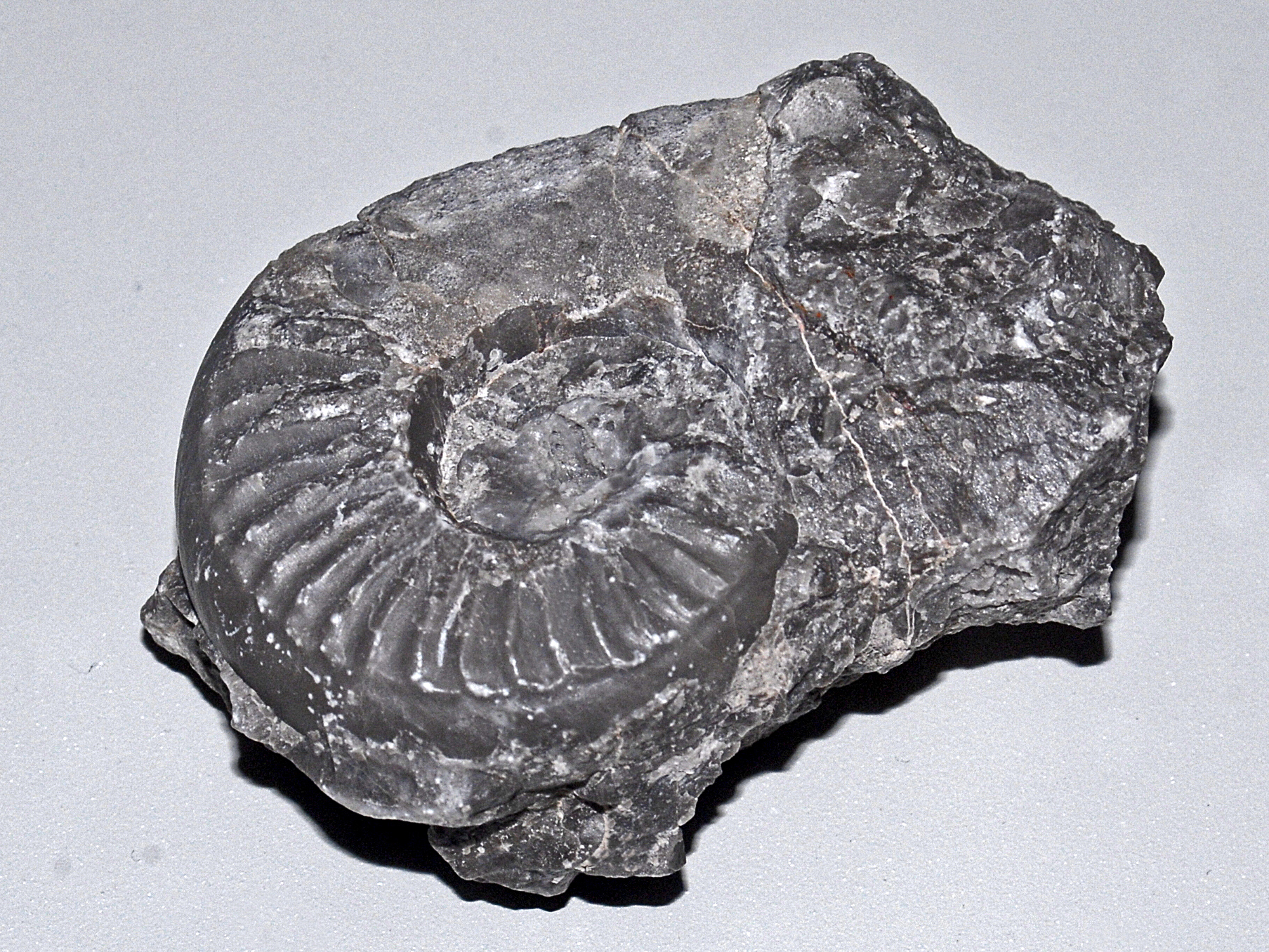
- Pleuronautilus mariani fossil
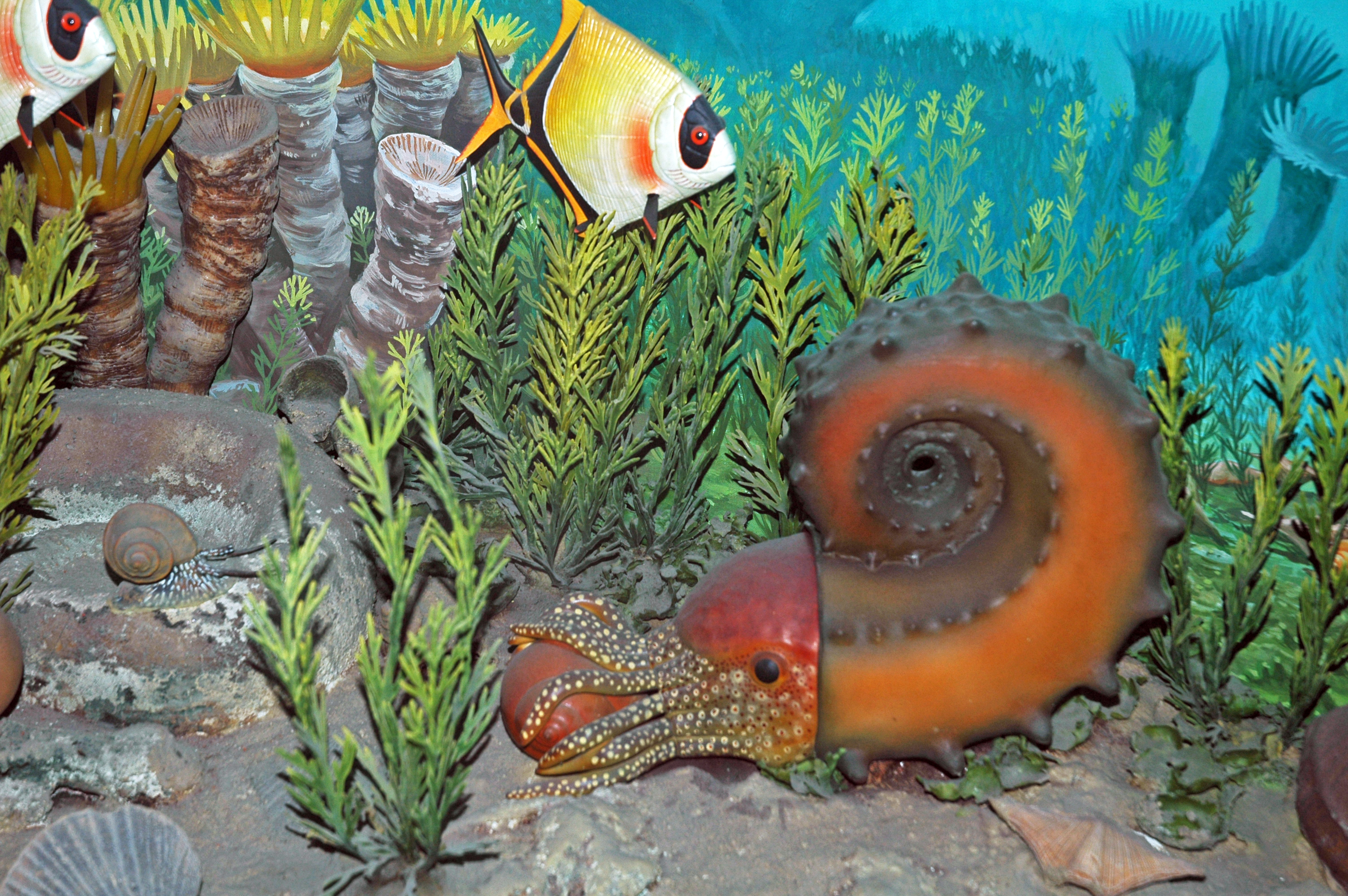
- Tainoceras reconstruction

Scientific classification
- Domain: Eukaryota
- Kingdom: Animalia
- Phylum: Mollusca
- Class: Cephalopoda
- Subclass: Nautiloidea
- Order: Nautilida
- Superfamily: †Tainoceratoidea
- Family: †Tainoceratidae; Hyatt, 1883

Genera
- See text

= Tainoceratidae =

Tainoceratidae Temporal range: Mississippian – Triassic

Extinct family of nautiloids

Tainoceratidae is a family of late Paleozoic and Triassic nautiloids that are a part of the order Nautilida, characterized by large, generally evolute shells with quadrate to rectangular whorl sections. Shells may bear ribs or nodes, or both.

Tainoceratidae forms the larger of the two branches of the superfamily Tainocerataceae derived from the earlier family Rutoceratidae around the end of the Devonian or early in the Mississippian (Lower Carboniferous). The other branch is the family Koninckioceratidae, which is confined to the Paleozoic. The family Tainoceratidae, in contrast, extends to almost to the end of the Triassic and during the Early Permian, possibly gave rise to the small family, Rhiphaeoceratidae.

The Tainoceratids are contemporary with the family Grypoceratidae, the dominant trigonoceratacean family, and with the family Liroceratidae form the bulk of species in the superfamily Clydonautilaceae, all three of which have the same Early Carboniferous to Triassic range. Twenty-one genera are ascribed to Tainoceratidae, of which 10 are confined to the Triassic while four cross into the Triassic after surviving the Permian-Triassic extinction. Seven are restricted to the Paleozoic.

== Genera ==
- Anoploceras
- Anthodiscoceras
- Araxonautilus
- Arctonautilus
- Aulametacoceras
- Clavinautilus
- Cooperoceras
- Encoiloceras
- Enoploceras
- Eulomacoceras
- Germanonautilus
- Grumantoceras
- Hefengnautilus
- Hexagonites
- Holconautilus
- Lichuanoceras
- Lirometacoceras
- Meixianlingites
- Metacoceras
- Mojsvaroceras
- Neoclavinautilus
- Neotainoceras
- Nodonautilus
- Nodopleuroceras
- Paratainoceras
- Paratainonautilus
- Phaedrysmocheilus
- Phloioceras
- Pleuronautilus
- Pseudometacoceras
- Pseudotemnocheilus
- Seironautilus
- Siamnautilus
- Sibyllonautilus
- Sinotitanoceras
- Tainionautilus
- Tainoceras
- Tanchiashanites
- Tirolonautilus
- Trachynautilus
