= Platymya antennata =

Scientific classification
- Kingdom: Animalia
- Phylum: Arthropoda
- Class: Insecta
- Order: Diptera
- Family: Tachinidae
- Subfamily: Exoristinae
- Tribe: Goniini
- Genus: Platymya
- Species: P. antennata

Binomial name
- Platymya antennata (Brauer & von Berganstamm, 1891)

Synonyms
- Exorista triseria Pandellé, 1896; Parexorista antennata Brauer & von Berganstamm, 1891; Platymya tristis Mesnil, 1953

Species of fly

Platymya antennata is a species of bristle fly in the family Tachinidae.

== Distribution ==
Turkmenistan, Bulgaria, Croatia, Italy, Macedonia, Slovenia, Turkey, France, Israel, Morocco, Russia, Armenia, China.
