= Trachynautilus =

Trachynautilus Temporal range: Mid - Late Triassic

Scientific classification
- Domain: Eukaryota
- Kingdom: Animalia
- Phylum: Mollusca
- Class: Cephalopoda
- Subclass: Nautiloidea
- Order: Nautilida
- Family: †Tainoceratidae
- Genus: †Trachynautilus; Mojsisovics, 1902

Genus of nautiloids

Trachynautilus is a member of the Tainoceratidae, named by Mojsisovics in 1902, with longitudinal ridges on the flanks of its high-arched involute shell. Phloiocedas from the Upper Triassic of North America is similar except that its venter also has longitudinal ridges. Trachynautilus from the middle and Upper Triassic of Europe has a smooth venter.
