= Paranautilus =

Paranautilus Temporal range: M-U Triassic

Scientific classification
- Kingdom: Animalia
- Phylum: Mollusca
- Class: Cephalopoda
- Subclass: Nautiloidea
- Order: Nautilida
- Family: †Liroceratidae
- Genus: †Paranautilus; Mojsisovics, 1902

Extinct genus of molluscs

Paranautilus is a genus of the Nautiloid family Liroceratidae with a very involute, moderately globular, smooth shell. The venter, at the outer rim, is arched, grading into broadly convex flanks. The dorsom, on the inner rim, is deeply impressed. Septa a close spaced, with slightly sinuous sutures. A member of the Clydonautilaceae, Paranautilus lived during the Middle and Late Triassic (Anisian - Norian) in what is now North America, Europe, and south Asia. Contemporary Liroceratids include Indonautilus and Sibyllonautilus.
