= Hexagonites =

Hexagonites Temporal range: Permian

Scientific classification
- Kingdom: Animalia
- Phylum: Mollusca
- Class: Cephalopoda
- Subclass: Nautiloidea
- Order: Nautilida
- Family: †Tainoceratidae
- Genus: †Hexagonites; Hayasaka, 1947

Extinct genus of molluscs

Hexagonites is an extinct genus from the nautiloid order, Nautilida which includes the genus Nautilus currently found living in the tropical western Pacific. Hexagonites is included in the family Tainoceratidae, part of the superfamily Tainoceratoidea (Kummel, 1964)

Hexagonites is based on an incomplete, crushed specimen from the Permian of China. Its shell is very evolute, with an hexagonal whorl section, and six rows of tubercles, in pairs on the ventrolateral and dorsolateral shoulders. The suture has shallow lobes. (ibid)
