= Platymya confusionis =

Scientific classification
- Kingdom: Animalia
- Phylum: Arthropoda
- Class: Insecta
- Order: Diptera
- Family: Tachinidae
- Subfamily: Exoristinae
- Tribe: Goniini
- Genus: Platymya
- Species: P. confusionis

Binomial name
- Platymya confusionis (Sellers, 1943)

Synonyms
- Sturima confusionis Sellers, 1943

Species of fly

Platymya confusionis is a species of bristle fly in the family Tachinidae.

== Distribution ==
Canada, United States.
