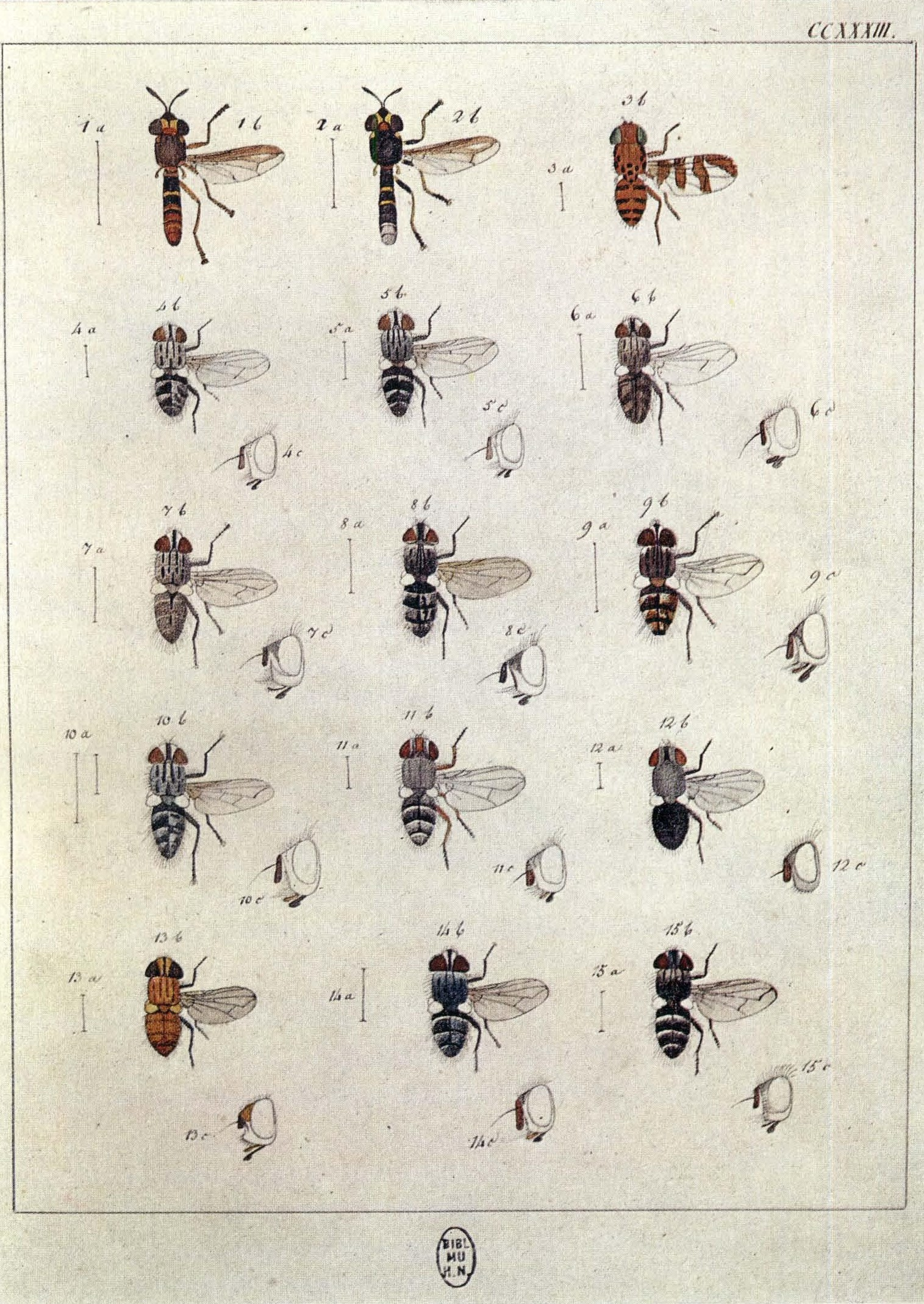
- Platyma fimbriata figure 5

Scientific classification
- Kingdom: Animalia
- Phylum: Arthropoda
- Class: Insecta
- Order: Diptera
- Family: Tachinidae
- Subfamily: Exoristinae
- Tribe: Goniini
- Genus: Platymya
- Species: P. fimbriata

Binomial name
- Platymya fimbriata (Meigen)

Synonyms
- Tachina fimbriata Meigen, 1824; Phryxe aprica Robineau-Desvoidy, 1863; Phryxe consobrina Robineau-Desvoidy, 1830; Phryxe levis Robineau-Desvoidy, 1863; Phryxe quaesita Robineau-Desvoidy, 1863; Platymya aestivalis Robineau-Desvoidy, 1830; Platymya genibarbis Mesnil, 1954; Platymya nitida Robineau-Desvoidy, 1863; Tachina arvensis Meigen, 1824; Tachina brevipennis Meigen, 1838; Tachina commixta Zetterstedt, 1849; Tachina hyalinata Zetterstedt, 1844; Tachina hyalipennis Zetterstedt, 1838; Tachina nemestrina Meigen, 1824; Tachina tricingulata Zetterstedt, 1838; Phryxe concolor Robineau-Desvoidy, 1863

= Platymya fimbriata =

Species of fly

Platymya fimbriata is a species of bristle fly in the family Tachinidae.

== Distribution ==
British Isles, Czech Republic, Estonia, Hungary, Latvia, Lithuania, Moldova, Poland, Romania, Slovakia, Ukraine, Denmark, Finland, Norway, Sweden, Albania, Andorra, Bosnia and Herzegovina, Bulgaria, Corsica, Croatia, Greece, Italy, Portugal, Serbia, Slovenia, Spain, Turkey, Austria, Belgium, France, Germany, Netherlands, Switzerland, South Korea, Israel, Mongolia, Russia, Transcaucasia, China.
