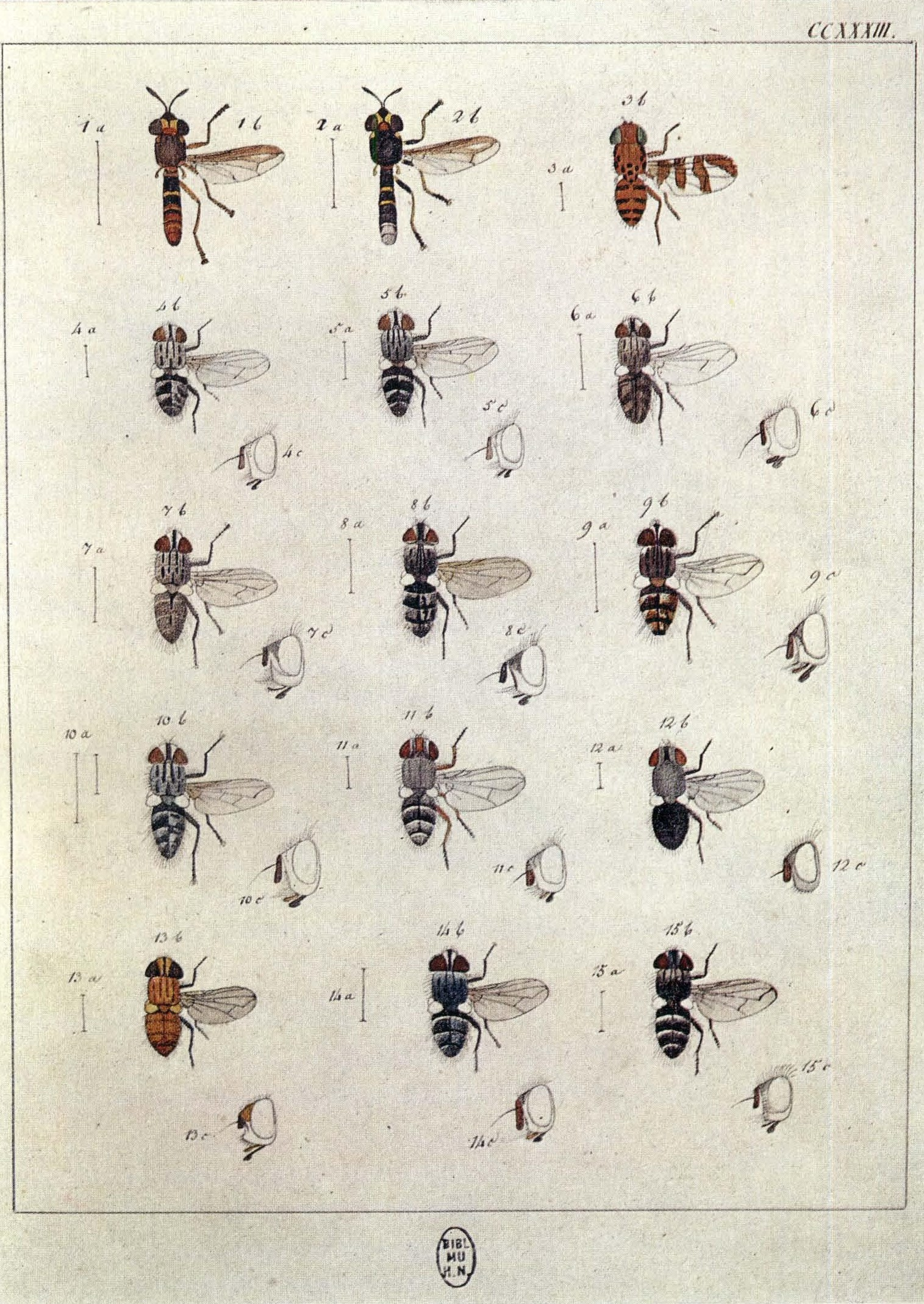
- Platyma fimbriata figure 5

Scientific classification
- Kingdom: Animalia
- Phylum: Arthropoda
- Clade: Pancrustacea
- Class: Insecta
- Order: Diptera
- Family: Tachinidae
- Subfamily: Exoristinae
- Tribe: Goniini
- Genus: Platymya; Robineau-Desvoidy, 1830

Type species
- Platymya aestivalis Robineau-Desvoidy, 1830

Synonyms
- Platymtia Herting & Dely-Draskovits, 1993; Platymyia Agassiz, 1846

= Platymya =

Genus of flies

Platymya is a genus of flies in the family Tachinidae.

== Species ==
- Platymya antennata (Brauer & von Berganstamm, 1891)
- Platymya confusionis (Sellers, 1943)
- Platymya fimbriata (Meigen, 1824)
- Platymya trisetosa (Coquillett, 1902)
