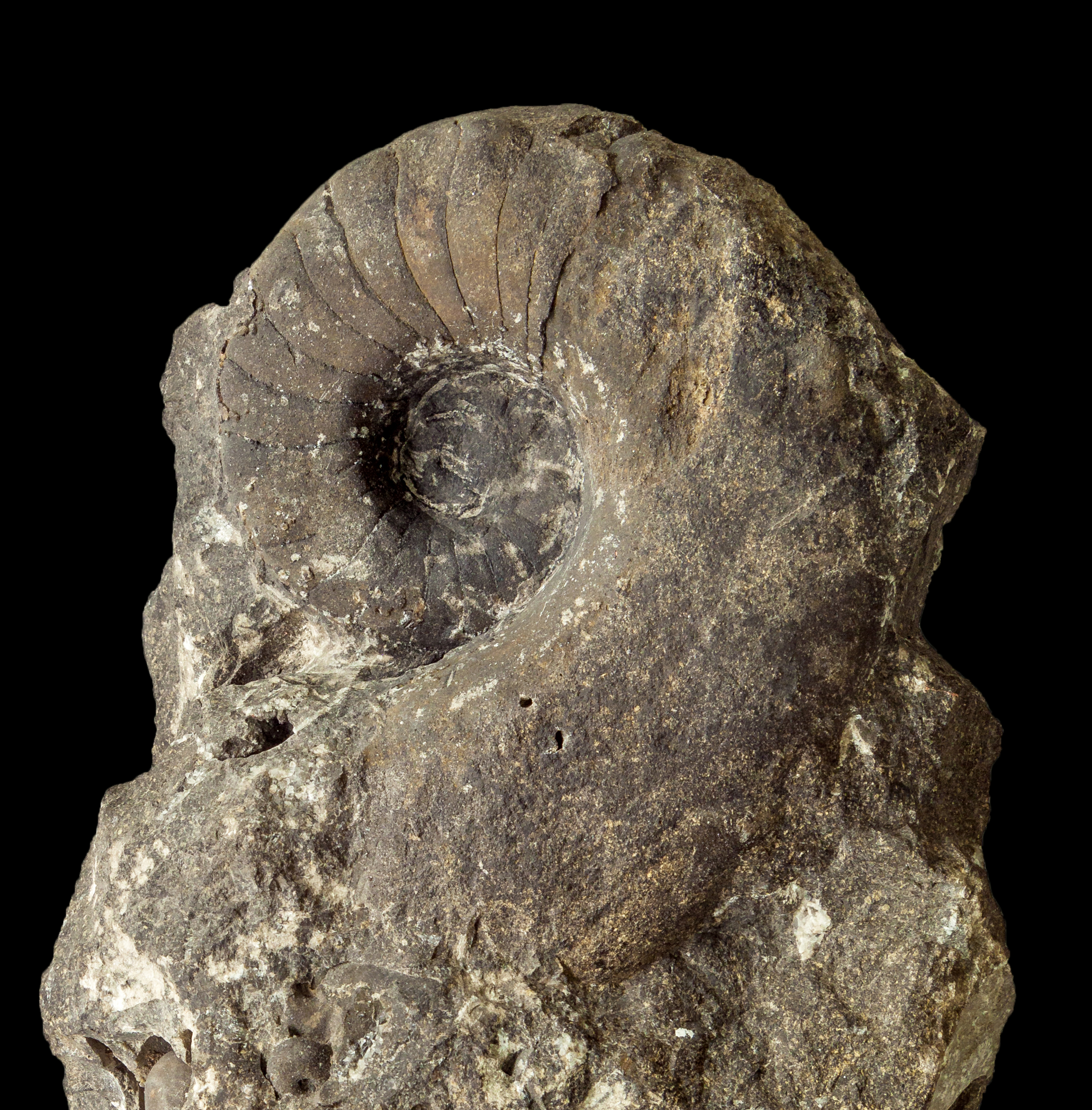
- Metacoceras discoideum

Scientific classification
- Kingdom: Animalia
- Phylum: Mollusca
- Class: Cephalopoda
- Subclass: Nautiloidea
- Order: Nautilida
- Family: †Tainoceratidae
- Genus: †Metacoceras; Hyatt 1883

= Metacoceras =

Metacoceras Temporal range: Pennsylvanian(LCarb) - Permian

Extinct genus of nautiloids

Metacoceras is a nautilitoid cephalopod from the Upper Carboniferous (Pennsylvanian) and Permian, the shell of which is moderately evolute with a subquadrate whorl section, bearing nodes on the ventral or umbilical shoulders or both, but otherwise smooth. The siphuncle is small, subcentral and orthochoanitic. The suture has shallow ventral and lateral lobes but no dorsal or annular lobe.

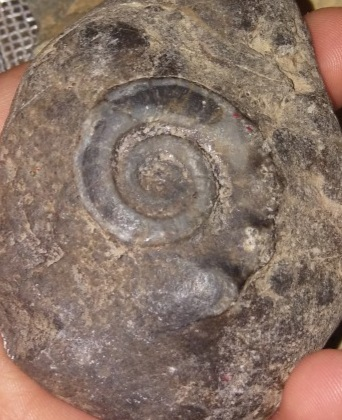
Metacoceras fossil from Late Permian of Iran

Matacoceras, named by Hyatt, 1883, is a genus in the nautilid superfamily Tainocerataceae. Its distribution is cosmopolitan.
