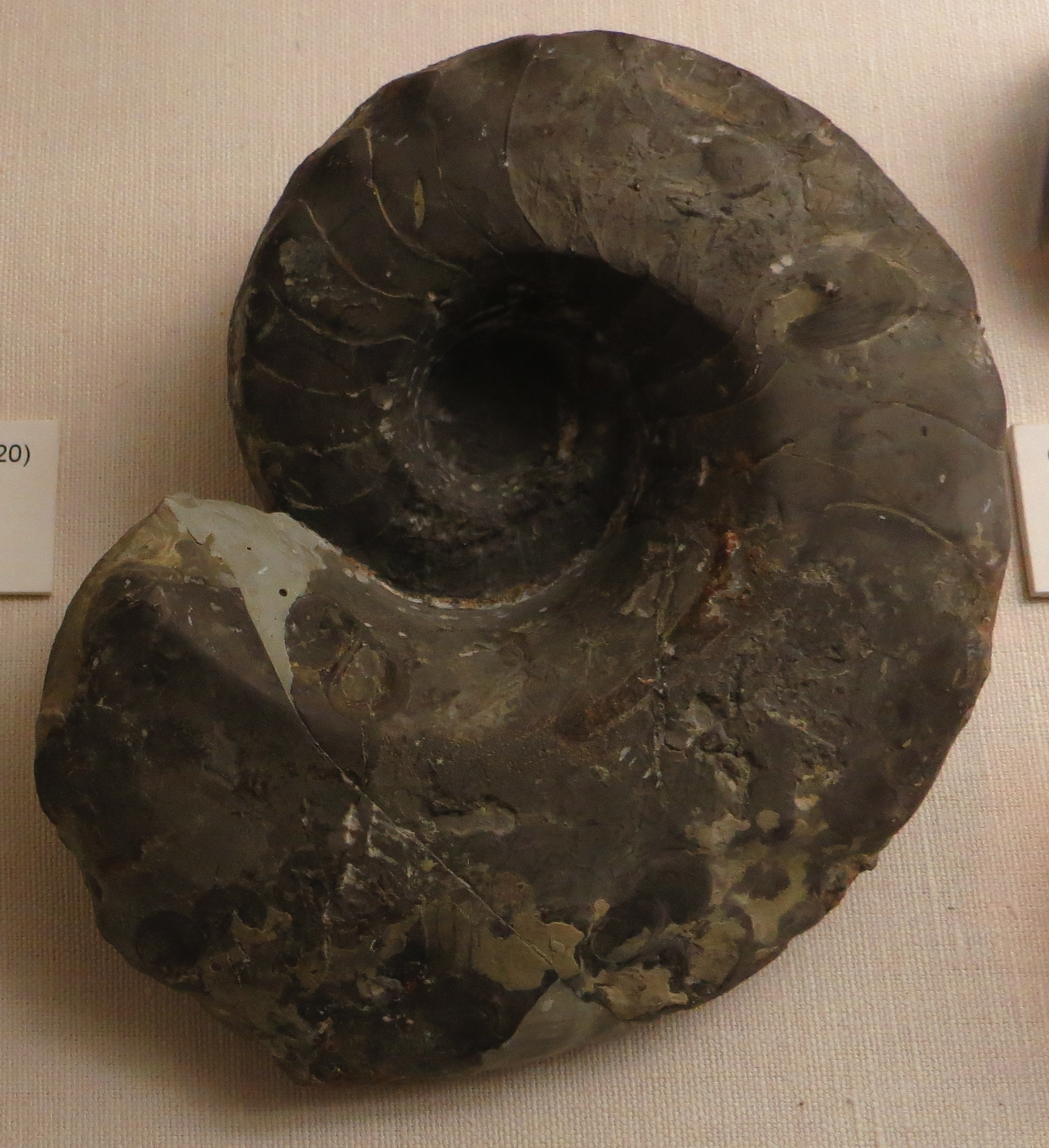
- Germanonautilus suevicus from the Muschelkalk of Germany

Scientific classification
- Kingdom: Animalia
- Phylum: Mollusca
- Class: Cephalopoda
- Subclass: Nautiloidea
- Order: Nautilida
- Family: †Tainoceratidae
- Genus: †Germanonautilus; Mojsisovics, 1902

Type species
- †Nautilus bidorsatus Schlotheim, 1820

Species
- G. bidorsatus (Schlotheim, 1820); G. dolomiticus (Quenstedt, 1845); G. salinarius (Mojsisovics, 1882); G. suevicus (Philippi, 1898); G. tridorsatus (Böttcher, 1938)

= Germanonautilus =

Germanonautilus Temporal range: 247–186 Ma Anisian to Pliensbachian

Extinct genus of cephalopods

Germanonautilus is a cephalopod genus in the nautilid family Tainoceratidae. It is characterized by a particularly broad shell with a flat venter and is relatively large, reaching diameters of over 30 cm. The genus contains many species and was geographically widespread, occurring in south and central Europe, North Africa, the Middle East, Asia and India, and the Circum-Pacific regions of North America and Japan. It lived from the Middle Triassic to the Lower Jurassic.

== Description ==
The shell is a moderately involute nautilicone; whorl section subquadrate to trapezoidal, widest across the umbilical shoulders, flanks flattened and ventrally convergent, venter flat and wide, dorsum narrowly and deeply impressed. The suture is with broad and deep lateral lobes and a shallow ventral lobe. The siphuncle is central and nummuloidal, composed of expanded segments that give a beaded appearance.

The deep hyponomic sinus allowed a large range of motion for the hyponome. The length of the body chamber indicates that the shell floated with the aperture sitting at an angle of 40-60° from vertical, which is slightly closer to horizontal than in the present-day Nautilus. Preserved soft tissue attachment structures on the shell suggest a soft tissue anatomy similar to Nautilus.

The jaws of Germanonautilus (composed of calcitic and chitinous parts) are also known. Unlike in Nautilus, where the upper jaw is smooth and the lower jaw bears denticles, the massive calcitic tips of both the upper and lower jaws bear ridges. The chitinous "wings" of the lower jaw are also more elongated and the jaws are larger overall than in Nautilus.

== Ecology ==
The wide conch with a high expansion rate created high drag in water. Combined with the oblique orientation of the aperture, this made Germanonautilus a slow horizontal swimmer. Because of this, it probably led a nektobenthic lifestyle like the present-day Nautilus.

The conch was occasionally settled by various epifaunal invertebrates, including the common oyster Placunopsis ostracina. Interestingly, in the same deposits, Placunopsis shells tend to be smaller on Germanonautilus than on the distantly related ammonoid Ceratites, which had a more streamlined conch and was likely a faster swimmer. The size difference of epibionts suggests that Placunopsis benefitted from faster water currents (enabling more efficient filter feeding) on Ceratites than on Germanonautilus, thus supporting differences in swimming styles between the two cephalopod taxa.

The ridged calcitic parts of the jaws are robust and some show extensive traces of wear, indicating Germanonautilus may have fed on thick-shelled prey.

== Taphonomy ==
When Germanonautilus conchs sank to the seafloor after the death of the animal, their broad and flat venter frequently led to them being deposited "standing" in near-life position. This created elevated "benthic islands" on the soft sediment, which attracted epifauna favouring hard substrates, such as crinoids, brachiopods, bryozoans, bivalves, annelids, and foraminifera. Various organisms may also have used the empty conchs as shelter, including coelacanths, crustaceans, and brittle stars.

== Bibliography ==
- Bernhard Kummerl, 1964. Nautiloidea-Nautilida. Treatise on Invertebrate Paleontology Part K. Geological Society of America and University of Kansas Press.
- Germanonautilus in Paleobiology Database
- J.J. Sepkoski, 2002. List of Nautiloid genera.
