= Phaedrysmocheilus =

Phaedrysmocheilus Temporal range: Early Triassic

Scientific classification
- Domain: Eukaryota
- Kingdom: Animalia
- Phylum: Mollusca
- Class: Cephalopoda
- Subclass: Nautiloidea
- Order: Nautilida
- Family: †Tainoceratidae
- Genus: †Phaedrysmocheilus; Shimanskiy & Erlanger, 1955

Extinct genus of molluscs

Phaedrysmocheilus is a genus of Early Triassic Tainoceratids (Nautiloidea, Cephalopoda) from Siberia. The shell is a rapidly expanding, moderately involute nautilicone; smooth in the adult stage but laterally ribbed in the juvenile stage. Volutions are convex laterally, arched ventrally, embraced dorsally. Whorl sections change during development from being slightly depressed, early, to slightly compressed later, changing from being relatively wide to relatively high. The umbilicus is deep and funnel shaped. Sutures are slightly sinuous.
