= Sibyllonautilus =

Sibyllonautilus Temporal range: mid -late Triassic

Scientific classification
- Kingdom: Animalia
- Phylum: Mollusca
- Class: Cephalopoda
- Subclass: Nautiloidea
- Order: Nautilida
- Family: †Tainoceratidae
- Genus: †Sibyllonautilus; Diener, 1915

Genus of molluscs

Sibyllonautilus is an extinct genus of nautiloids from the Middle and Late Triassic. It is one of the last of the Tainoceratidae, a family of nautilids whose range begins much earlier in the Early Carboniferous (Mississippian).
