= Enoploceras =

Enoploceras Temporal range: Triassic

Scientific classification
- Domain: Eukaryota
- Kingdom: Animalia
- Phylum: Mollusca
- Class: Cephalopoda
- Subclass: Nautiloidea
- Order: Nautilida
- Family: †Tainoceratidae
- Genus: †Enoploceras; Hyatt in Zittel 1900

Genus of nautiloids

Enoploceras is a Tainoceratid genus, a nautiloid cephalopod in the order Nautilida, known from Triassic sediments in Europe, India, Timor, and the state of Idaho.

Enoploceras is characterised by its moderately involute shell with a broad subquadrate whorl section; venter and flanks flattened; ventral and umbilical shoulders sharply rounded; flanks with nodes at ventral or umbilical shoulders or both, and with radial ribs and sinuous growth lines; umbilicus deep, straight walled, and with small perforation. The siphuncle is subcentral. Sutures form shallow lobes on the venter, flanks and dorsum.

Enoploceras is like Anoploceras in that both have a broad subquadrate, wider than high, whorl section but differs in that Anoploceras has conspicuous ribs while Enoploceras has primarily nodes.
