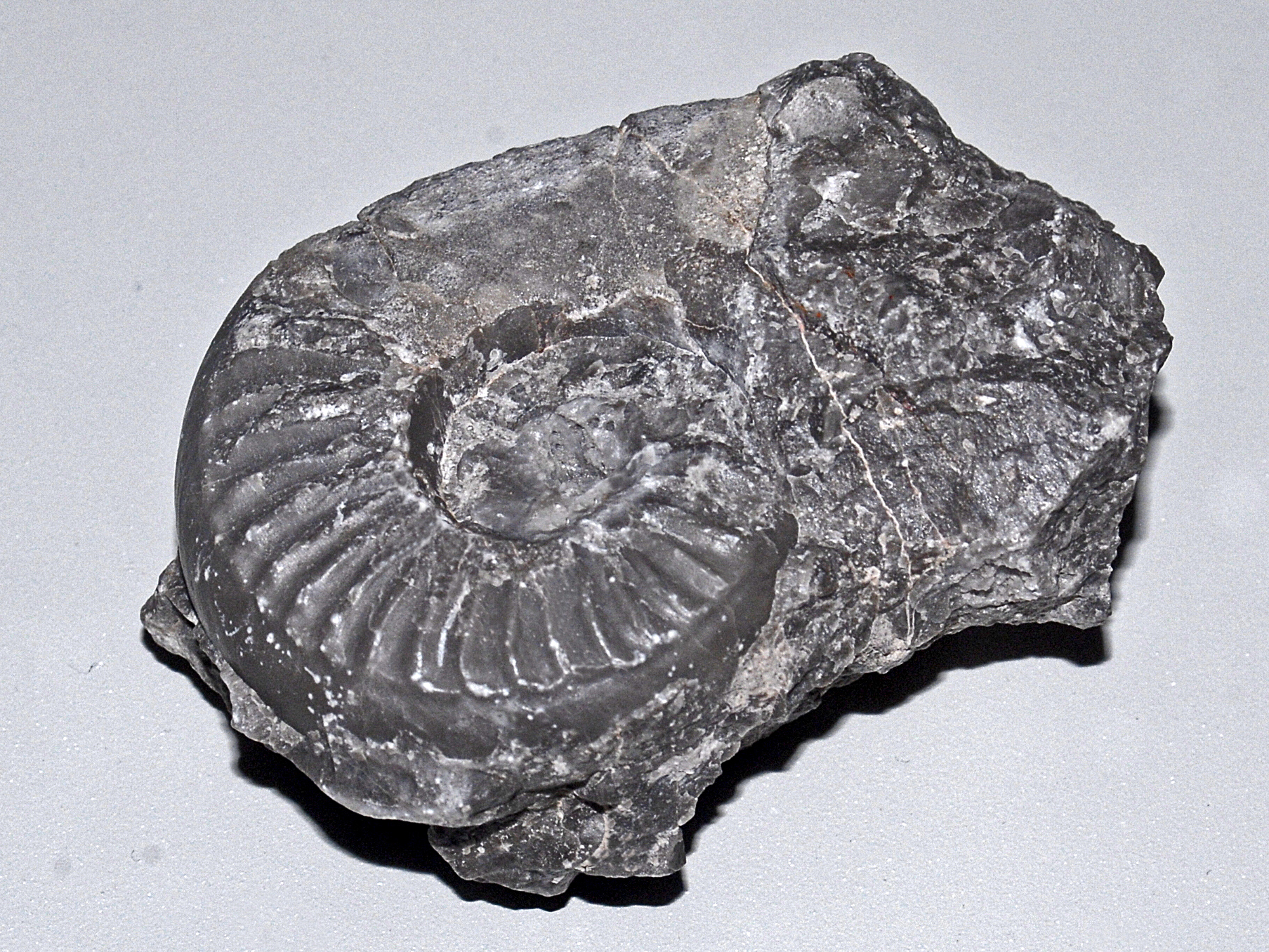
- Pleuronautilus mariani from Ladinian of Italy

Scientific classification
- Kingdom: Animalia
- Phylum: Mollusca
- Class: Cephalopoda
- Subclass: Nautiloidea
- Order: Nautilida
- Family: †Tainoceratidae
- Genus: †Pleuronautilus; Mojsisovics, 1882

= Pleuronautilus =

Pleuronautilus Temporal range: Carboniferous – Triassic 298.9–205.6 Ma

Extinct genus of nautiloids

Pleuronautilus is a nautiloid genus; family Tainoceratidae, order Nautilida.

== Description ==
The shell is evolute, discoidal; whorl section subquadrade, flanks generally straight but may converge toward the venter. Inner flanks have course ribbing, outer have rows of nodes. Sutures have shallow ventral, lateral, and dorsal lobes. Its siphuncle is small and approximately central.

== Fossil records ==
Pleuronautilus has been found in Upper Permian marine limestone in Armenia, China, and Iran, sometimes associated with orthocerids, ammonoids, and other nautilids as well as other invertebrates; in Upper Permian offshore mudstone and calcareous siltstone in the northern Caucasus, and in upper Lower Permian marine sediments in Tajikistan with grypoceratids and pronoritids. It has been found also in Lower Triassic black marine calcareous shale in Afghanistan with orthocerid, aulacocerid, phylloceratitd and ceratitid cephalopod genera and in early Upper deltaic shale and marl with ceratitids, pelecypods, and gastropods in Slovenia; and mid upper offshore mudstone with Paranautilus and Rhacophyllites and ceratitids in western Nevada.

== Species ==
Species within this genus include:

- †Pleuronautilus alaskensis Kummel 1953
- †Pleuronautilus changxingensis Zhao et al. 1978
- †Pleuronautilus cooperi Miller 1945
- †Pleuronautilus costalis Shimansky 1965
- †Pleuronautilus dzhagadzurensis Zakharov 1989
- †Pleuronautilus dzhulfensis Shimansky 1965
- †Pleuronautilus gaudryi von Mojsisovics 1902
- †Pleuronautilus gregarius Miller 1945
- †Pleuronautilus incertus Abich 1878
- †Pleuronautilus latissimus Waagen 1879
- †Pleuronautilus lepsiusi von Mojsisovics 1902
- †Pleuronautilus linchengense Yi 1933
- †Pleuronautilus loczyi Fliegel 1901
- †Pleuronautilus magnicostatus Miller 1945
- †Pleuronautilus magnus Zheng 1984
- †Pleuronautilus mariani Airaghi 1902
- †Pleuronautilus megaporus Miller 1945
- †Pleuronautilus mosis Mojsisovics 1882
- †Pleuronautilus multicostatus Etheridge Jr. 1907
- †Pleuronautilus mutatus Miller 1945
- †Pleuronautilus praecursor Girty 1909
- †Pleuronautilus qinghaianus Wang and Chen 1979
- †Pleuronautilus russkiensis Zakharov 1978
- †Pleuronautilus shumardianus Girty 1909
- †Pleuronautilus sumatrensis Fliegel 1901
- †Pleuronautilus venustus Reed 1944
- †Pleuronautilus verae Arthaber 1900
- †Pleuronautilus yahagiensis Ehiro 1995
- †Pleuronautilus zhongyingensis Zheng 1984
