= 2012 in molluscan paleontology =

This list, 2012 in molluscan paleontology, is a list of new taxa of ammonites and other fossil cephalopods, as well as fossil gastropods and bivalves that have been described during the year 2012.

== Newly named ammonites ==
Note: "Sp nov" means a new species, "Gen nov" means a new genus, "et" means and, "comb nov" means a new combination (a new binomial name created by combining a known species name with a new genus name.)

Name	Novelty	Status	Authors	Age	Unit	Location	Notes	Images
Alocolytoceras isztimeri	Sp nov	Valid	Galácz & Kassai	Bajocian		Hungary	A member of Lytoceratina, a species of Alocolytoceras.	
Amorina intermedia	Sp. nov	Valid	Vermeulen et al.	Early Cretaceous (Hauterivian)		Switzerland	A relative of Anahamulina, a species of Amorina.	
Andiceras planulatus	Sp nov	Valid	Vennari, Alvarez & Aguirre-Urreta	Late Jurassic (late Tithonian) or Early Cretaceous (early Berriasian)		Argentina	A berriaselline neocomitid, a species of Andiceras.	
Asthenoceras taverai	Sp nov	Valid	Sandoval in Sandoval et al	Middle Jurassic (late Aalenian to early Bajocian)		Spain	A grammoceratine hildoceratid, a species of Asthenoceras.	
Badina bedouliensis	Sp. nov	Valid	Vermeulen et al.	Early Cretaceous (Aptian)		France	A member of the family Anahamulinidae.	
Baidites	Gen. et sp. et comb. nov.	Valid	Brühwiler & Bucher in Brühwiler et al.	Early Triassic		Oman; Timor	A flemingitid ammonite. The type species is B. hermanni; genus also contains "Ophiceras" crassecostatum Welter (1922) and "Ophiceras" tenue Welter (1922).	
Bastelia	Gen. et 2 sp. nov	Valid	Vermeulen et al.	Early Cretaceous (Hauterivian)		France; Switzerland	A hamulinid. The type species is Bastelia schloegli; genus also contains Bastelia taloirensis.	
Blascoceras	Gen. et comb. nov	Valid	Vermeulen et al.	Early Cretaceous (Hauterivian)		France; Italy; Spain	An ancyloceratoid related to Emericiceras. A new genus for "Ammonites" nodulosus Catullo (1848); genus also contains "Himalayites" laevis Fallot & Termier (1923)	
Boreotrachyceras	Gen. et comb. nov	Valid	Konstantinov	Early Carnian		Russia	A trachyceratid, a new genus for "Protrachyceras" omkutchanicum Bytschkov.	
Craspedites sachsi	Sp nov	Valid	Igolnikov	Berriasian		Russia	A species of Craspedites.	
Curacoites	Gen. et sp. nov	Valid	Aguirre-Urreta & Rawson	Valanginian or early Barremian	Agrio Formation	Argentina	The type species is Curacoites rotundus.	
Damaisiceras	Gen. et sp. nov	Valid	Vermeulen et al.	Early Cretaceous (Hauterivian)		France	A crioceratitid. The type species is Damaisiceras baquei.	
Dimorphites noricus	Sp nov	Valid	Balini et al.	Late Triassic	Scillato Formation	Italy	A species of Dimorphites.	
Dimorphoceratoides adamsi	Sp. nov	Valid	Work, Mason & Boardman	Pennsylvanian	Four Corners Formation	United States	A species of Dimorphoceratoides.	
Escarguelites	Gen. et sp. nov	Valid	Brühwiler, Bucher & Krystyn	Early Triassic		India	An arctoceratid. The type species is Escarguelites spitiensis.	
Flemingites hautmanni	Sp nov	Valid	Brühwiler & Bucher in Brühwiler et al.	Early Triassic		Pakistan	A flemingitid, a species of Flemingites.	
Flemingites hofmanni	Sp nov	Valid	Brühwiler & Bucher in Brühwiler et al.	Early Triassic		Pakistan	A flemingitid, a species of Flemingites.	
Flemingites planatus	Sp nov	Valid	Brühwiler & Bucher in Brühwiler et al.	Early Triassic		Pakistan	A flemingitid, a species of Flemingites.	
Galfettites kyrae	Sp nov	Valid	Brühwiler & Bucher in Brühwiler et al.	Early Triassic		Oman	A galfettitid ammonite, a species of Galfettites.	
Galfettites omani	Sp nov	Valid	Brühwiler & Bucher in Brühwiler et al.	Early Triassic		Oman	A galfettitid ammonite, a species of Galfettites.	
Garroniceras	Gen. et comb. nov	Valid	Vermeulen et al.	Early Cretaceous (Hauterivian)		France; Switzerland	A hamulinid. A new genus for "Ancyloceras" seringei Astier (1851); genus also contains Garroniceras picteti (Ooster, 1860) and Garroniceras morloti (Ooster, 1860).	
Gastrioceras magoffinense	Sp. nov	Valid	Work, Mason & Boardman	Pennsylvanian	Four Corners Formation	United States	A species of Gastrioceras.	
Goudemandites	Gen. et sp. nov	Valid	Brühwiler & Bucher in Brühwiler et al.	Early Triassic		China; Oman	A palaeophyllitid ammonite. The type species is Goudemandites sinensis.	
Herbiella	Nom. nov	Valid	Cooper	Cretaceous		Ukraine	A turrilitid; a replacement name for Klingerella Cooper (1999). The type species is "Turrilites" bicarinatus Kner (1852).	
Hermannites	Gen. et sp. nov	Valid	Brühwiler, Bucher & Krystyn	Early Triassic		India	A flemingitid. The type species is Hermannites rursiradiatus.	
Hildaites bisulcatus	Sp nov	Valid	Sassaroli & Venturi	Early Toarcian	Bugarone Formation	Italy	A hildoceratid, a species of Hildaites.	
Hildaites calamantis	Sp nov	Valid	Sassaroli & Venturi	Early Toarcian	Bugarone Formation	Italy	A hildoceratid, a species of Hildaites.	
Hildaites evolutus	Sp nov	Valid	Sassaroli & Venturi	Early Toarcian	Bugarone Formation	Italy	A hildoceratid, a species of Hildaites.	
Hildaites planiventris	Sp nov	Valid	Sassaroli & Venturi	Early Toarcian	Bugarone Formation	Italy	A hildoceratid, a species of Hildaites.	
Hochuliites	Gen. et sp. nov	Valid	Brühwiler & Bucher in Brühwiler et al.	Early Triassic		Pakistan	An inyoitid. The type species is Hochuliites retrocostatus.	
Homoeoplanulites marcelli	Sp. nov	Valid	Mangold, Martin & Prieur	Bathonian		France	A member of the family Perisphinctidae.	
Homoeoplanulites mouterdei	Sp. nov	Valid	Mangold, Martin & Prieur	Bathonian		France	A member of the family Perisphinctidae.	
Homoeoplanulites sandovali	Sp. nov	Valid	Mangold, Martin & Prieur	Bathonian		France	A member of the family Perisphinctidae.	
Indosphinctes tsatiaensis	Sp. nov	Valid	Hall & Poulton	Callovian		Canada	A perisphinctid ammonite, a species of Indosphinctes.	
Infraparkinsonia pierae	Sp. nov	Valid	Pavia & Zunino	Late Bajocian		France	A species of Infraparkinsonia, a possible member of Stephanoceratidae.	
Kashmirites baidi	Sp nov	Valid	Brühwiler & Bucher in Brühwiler et al.	Early Triassic		Oman; Pakistan	A xenoceltitid ammonite, a species of Kashmirites.	
Kiaborisia	Gen. et comb. nov	Valid	Bartzsch & Weyer	Devonian		Russia	A new genus for "Biloclymenia" aktubensis Bogoslovskiy (1981).	
Koiloceras	Gen. et sp. nov	Valid	Brühwiler & Bucher in Brühwiler et al.	Early Triassic		Pakistan	A gyronitid. The type species is Koiloceras romanoi.	
Kraffticeras	Gen. et comb. nov	Valid	Brühwiler, Bucher & Krystyn	Early Triassic		India	A ceratitid; a new genus for "Meekoceras" pseudoplanulatum Krafft & Diener (1909).	
Lepinayceras	Gen. et 3 sp. et comb. nov	Valid	Vermeulen et al.	Early Cretaceous		Argentina; France; Morocco	An ancyloceratoid related to Emericiceras. The type species is Lepinayceras sandovali; genus also contains new species Lepinayceras rouxelae and Lepinayceras chamateuilensis, as well as "Crioceras" precrassispina Roch (1930) and "Paraspiticeras" groeberi Aguirre-Urreta (1993).	
Lepteocaloceras	Gen. et 2 sp. nov	Valid	Dommergues	Hettangian		France	A psiloceratid ammonite. Genus contains the type species Lepteocaloceras evrardii and possibly also the species Lepteocaloceras ? strictum.	
Leptosphinctes (Cleistosphinctes) umbilicatus	Sp nov	Valid	Galácz	Bajocian		Hungary	A species of Leptosphinctes.	
Liautaudia	Gen. et sp. nov	Valid	Vermeulen et al.	Early Cretaceous (Hauterivian)		France; Switzerland	A hamulinid. The type species is Liautaudia fumisuginiformis.	
Linaresites	Gen. et comb. nov	Valid	Sandoval in Sandoval et al.	Middle Jurassic (late Aalenian to early Bajocian)		Morocco; Spain	A grammoceratine hildoceratid, a new genus for "Fontannesia" montillanensis Linares and Sandoval (1988).	
Lucasites	Gen. et 2 sp. nov	Valid	Brühwiler & Bucher in Brühwiler et al.	Early Triassic		Oman	A prionitid ammonite. Genus contains two species: Lucasites involutus and L. evolutus.	
Maximites nassichuki	Sp. nov	Valid	Work, Mason & Boardman	Pennsylvanian	Four Corners Formation	United States	A species of Maximites.	
Mianwaliites	Gen. et sp. nov	Valid	Brühwiler & Bucher in Brühwiler et al.	Early Triassic		Pakistan	A palaeophyllitid. The type species is Mianwaliites multiradiatus.	
Monneticeras	Gen. et sp. nov	Valid	Brühwiler & Bucher in Brühwiler et al.	Early Triassic		Pakistan	A proptychitid. The type species is Monneticeras compressum.	
Nannolytoceras gibbosum	Sp nov	Valid	Galácz & Kassai	Bajocian		Hungary	A member of Lytoceratina, a species of Nannolytoceras.	
Neograhamites primus	Sp. nov	Valid	Olivero	Upper Campanian	Snow Hill Island Formation	Antarctica	A kossmaticeratid ammonite, a species of Neograhamites.	
Neokossmaticeras	Gen. et sp. nov	Valid	Olivero	Upper Campanian	Rabot Formation	Antarctica	A kossmaticeratid ammonite. The type species is Neokossmaticeras redondensis.	
Notosilesitoides	Gen. et sp. nov.	Valid	Matsukawa et al.	Aptian to early Albian		Philippines	The type species is Notosilesitoides philippinensis.	
Nuetzelia	Gen. et sp. nov	Valid	Brühwiler, Bucher & Krystyn	Early Triassic		India	An arctoceratid. The type species is Nuetzelia himalayica.	
Obataceras	Gen. et sp. nov	Valid	Shigeta, Futakami & Hoffmann	Late Albian		Japan	A gabbioceratine ammonite. The type species is Obataceras manjiense.	
Okhototrachyceras	Gen. et comb. nov	Valid	Konstantinov	Early Carnian		Russia	A trachyceratid, a new genus for "Protrachyceras" seimkanense Bytschkov.	
Omanites	Gen. et sp. nov	Valid	Brühwiler & Bucher in Brühwiler et al.	Early Triassic		Oman	A paranannitid ammonite. The type species is Omanites musjahensis.	
Oxyarietites	Gen. et sp. nov	Valid	Dommergues & Goolaerts	Early Sinemurian		France	An arietitoid, a member of Phylloceratida. The type species is Oxyarietites boletzkyi.	
Pacaudina dechauxi	Sp. nov	Valid	Vermeulen et al.	Early Cretaceous		France	A member of the family Anahamulinidae.	
Pacaudina lurensis	Sp. nov	Valid	Vermeulen et al.	Early Cretaceous (Barremian)		France	A member of the family Anahamulinidae.	
Paranannites baudi	Gen. et sp. nov	Valid	Brühwiler & Bucher in Brühwiler et al.	Early Triassic		Oman	A paranannitid ammonite, a species of Paranannites.	
Paraspidites obesus	Sp. nov	Valid	Brühwiler & Bucher in Brühwiler et al.	Early Triassic		Pakistan	A meekoceratid, a species of Paraspidites.	
Perisphinctes (Arisphinctes) kachchhensis	Sp nov	Valid	Pandey, Alberti & Fürsich	Late Jurassic (Oxfordian)		India	A species of Perisphinctes.	
Perisphinctes (Arisphinctes) kantkotensis	Sp nov	Valid	Pandey, Alberti & Fürsich	Late Jurassic (Oxfordian)		India	A species of Perisphinctes.	
Phaneroceras chesnuti	Sp. nov	Valid	Work, Mason & Boardman	Pennsylvanian	Four Corners Formation	United States	A species of Phaneroceras.	
Phaulostephanus apertus	Sp nov	Valid	Galácz	Bajocian		Hungary	A species of Phaulostephanus.	
Phaulostephanus exilis	Sp nov	Valid	Galácz	Bajocian		Hungary	A species of Phaulostephanus.	
Phylloceras (Goretophylloceras) liouxense	Sp nov	Valid	Joly & Mercier	Early Cretaceous (Valanginian)		France	A phylloceratine phylloceratid, a species of Phylloceras.	
Prevalia saintjohnpersi	Sp. nov	Valid	Mangold, Martin & Prieur	Bathonian		France	A member of the family Perisphinctidae.	
Prionites nammalensis	Sp. nov	Valid	Brühwiler & Bucher in Brühwiler et al.	Early Triassic		Pakistan	A prionitid, a species of Prionites.	
Procerites praequercinus	Sp. nov	Valid	Mangold, Martin & Prieur	Bathonian		France	A member of the family Perisphinctidae.	
Procolumbites safraensis	Sp nov	Valid	Brühwiler & Bucher in Brühwiler et al.	Late Early Triassic		Oman	A columbitid ammonite, a species of Procolumbites.	
Prososphinctes polelum	Sp. nov	Valid	Głowniak	Late Jurassic (Oxfordian)		Poland	A member of Perisphinctidae.	
Pseudaspidites planus	Sp nov	Valid	Brühwiler & Bucher in Brühwiler et al.	Early Triassic		Oman	A proptychitid ammonite, a species of Pseudaspidites.	
Pseudomoutoniceras martinoti	Sp. nov	Valid	Vermeulen et al.	Early Cretaceous (Hauterivian)		France	A crioceratitid, a species of Pseudomoutoniceras.	
Ptychohamulina testeorum	Sp nov	Valid	Baudouin et al.	Early Cretaceous (late Barremian)		France	A hamulinid, a species of Ptychohamulina.	
Punjabites	Gen. et sp. nov	Valid	Brühwiler & Bucher in Brühwiler et al.	Early Triassic		Pakistan	A prionitid. The type species is Punjabites punjabiensis.	
Rohillites omanensis	Sp nov	Valid	Brühwiler & Bucher in Brühwiler et al.	Early Triassic		Oman	A flemingitid ammonite, a species of Rohillites.	
Rohillites pakistanensis	Sp. nov	Valid	Brühwiler & Bucher in Brühwiler et al.	Early Triassic		Pakistan	A flemingitid, a species of Rohillites.	
Ropoloceras	Gen. et comb. nov	Valid	Vermeulen et al.	Early Cretaceous (Late Hauterivian)		France; Spain; Switzerland	A crioceratitid; a new genus for "Crioceras" seitzi Sarkar (1955).	
Sabaudiella riverorum	Sp nov	Valid	Aguirre-Urreta & Rawson	Valanginian or early Barremian	Agrio Formation	Argentina	A species of Sabaudiella.	
Safraites	Gen. et sp. nov	Valid	Brühwiler & Bucher in Brühwiler et al.	Early Triassic		Oman	A galfettitid ammonite. The type species is Safraites simplex.	
Schaffhauseria	Gen. et 2 sp. nov	Valid	Vermeulen et al.	Early Cretaceous (Hauterivian)		Switzerland	A hamulinid. The type species is Schaffhauseria schirollii. Originally genus also contained second species Schaffhauseria veveysensis; however, this species was subsequently transferred to the genus Lahonderella.	
Siemiradzkia escollensis	Sp. nov	Valid	Mangold, Martin & Prieur	Bathonian		France	A member of the family Perisphinctidae.	
Siemiradzkia richei	Sp. nov	Valid	Mangold, Martin & Prieur	Bathonian		France	A member of the family Perisphinctidae.	
Shamaraites rursiradiatus	Sp. nov	Valid	Brühwiler & Bucher in Brühwiler et al.	Early Triassic		Pakistan	A flemingitid, a species of Shamaraites.	
Steckites	Gen. et sp. nov	Valid	Brühwiler, Bucher & Krystyn	Early Triassic		India	A paranannitid. The type species is Steckites brevus.	
Stephanosphinctes tuberculatus	Sp nov	Valid	Galácz	Bajocian		Hungary	A species of Stephanosphinctes.	
Stoliczkaiella	Nom. nov	Valid	Cooper	Cretaceous		France	A lyelliceratid; a replacement name for Stoliczkaia Neumayr (1875). The type species is "Ammonites" dispar d'Orbigny (1851).	
Subinyoites punjabiensis	Sp. nov	Valid	Brühwiler & Bucher in Brühwiler et al.	Early Triassic		Pakistan	An inyoitid, a species of Subinyoites.	
Subvishnuites posterus	Sp. nov	Valid	Brühwiler, Bucher & Krystyn	Early Triassic		India	An inyoitid, a species of Subvishnuites.	
Takahashiella	Nom. nov	Junior homonym	Cooper	Cretaceous		Japan	A lytoceratid; a replacement name for Takahashia Matsumoto (1984). The replacement name itself turned out to be preoccupied by Takahashiella Borkhsenius (1964); Hoffmann & Howarth (2015) coined a new replacement name Takahashiceras. The type species is "Takahashia" eureka Matsumoto (1984).	
Tanabeceras	Gen. et sp. nov	Valid	Shigeta, Futakami & Hoffmann	Late Albian		Japan	A gabbioceratine ammonite. The type species is Tanabeceras pombetsense.	
Trachyceras silberlingi	Sp nov	Valid	Balini, Jenks & Martin	Late Triassic (early Carnian)		United States	A trachyceratid, a species of Trachyceras.	
Truempyceras	Gen. et comb. et sp. nov	Valid	Brühwiler & Bucher in Brühwiler et al.	Early Triassic		India; Pakistan	An arctoceratid. A new genus for "Anasibirites" pluriformis Guex (1978); genus also contains a new species Truempyceras compressum Brühwiler, Bucher & Krystyn (2012).	
Ussurijuvenites	Gen. et 2 sp. nov	Valid	Smyshlyaeva & Zakharov	Early Olenekian		Russia	A melagathiceratid. The type species is U. popovi. U.s artyomensis is a second species.	
Vacekia striata	Sp nov	Valid	Henriques in Sandoval et al.	Jurassic (late Toarcian to early Aalenian)		Portugal; Spain	A grammoceratine hildoceratid, a species of Vacekia.	
Wagnericeras compressum	Sp. nov	Valid	Mangold, Martin & Prieur	Bathonian		France	A member of the family Perisphinctidae.	
Wagnericeras sericonstrictione	Sp. nov	Valid	Mangold, Martin & Prieur	Bathonian		France	A member of the family Perisphinctidae.	

== Other cephalopods ==
Name	Novelty	Status	Authors	Age	Unit	Location	Notes	Images
Arctoteuthis britanna	Sp nov	Valid	Dzyuba	Jurassic–Cretaceous boundary		Russia; United Kingdom	A belemnite, a species of Arctoteuthis.	
Aturia gujaratensis	Sp nov	Valid	Halder	Early Miocene	Chhasra Formation; Khari Nadi Formation	India		
Bathmoceras taichoutense	Sp nov	Valid	Kröger & Lefebvre	Early Ordovician	Fezouata Formation	Morocco	A species of Bathmoceras.	
Calabribelus	Gen. et sp. nov	Valid	Weis, Mariotti & Riegraf	Middle Jurassic (early Bajocian)		France; Italy	A holcobelid belemnite. The type species is Calabribelus pallinii.	
Curtohibolites (?) bourguetensis	Sp. nov	Valid	Janssen, Clément & Bont	Early Cretaceous (Barremian)		France	A mesohibolitid belemnite, possibly a species of Curtohibolites.	
Cylindroteuthis venusta	Sp nov	Valid	Dzyuba	Jurassic–Cretaceous boundary		Russia	A belemnite, a species of Cylindroteuthis.	
Cyrtobelus	Gen. et 2 sp. nov	Valid	Fuchs et al.	Late Cretaceous (late Campanian–late Maastrichtian)	Northumberland Formation	Canada; Greenland	A member of the family Groenlandibelidae. The type species is C. birkelundae; genus also includes new species C. hornbyense.	
Deltoidonautilus vredenburgi	Sp nov	Valid	Halder	Early Eocene	Naredi Formation	India		
Destombesiceras	Gen. et sp. nov	Valid	Kröger & Lefebvre	Early Ordovician	Fezouata Formation	Morocco	A discosorid cephalopod. The type species is Destombesiceras zagorense.	
Discoceras costatum	Sp. nov	Valid	Rasmussen & Surlyk	Ordovician (late Katian)	Lindegård Formation	Denmark	A species of Discoceras.	
Discoceras vasegaardense	Sp. nov	Valid	Rasmussen & Surlyk	Ordovician (late Katian)	Lindegård Formation	Denmark	A species of Discoceras.	
Duvalia vermeuleni	Sp. nov	Valid	Janssen, Clément & Bont	Early Cretaceous (Barremian)		France; Hungary; Slovakia	A duvaliid belemnite, a species of Duvalia.	
Germanoteuthis	Gen. et sp. nov	Valid	Schweigert & Fuchs	Ladinian		Germany	A coleoid cephalopod. The type species is Germanoteuthis donai.	
Heminautilus boselliorum	Sp. nov	Valid	Delanoy et al.	Early Cretaceous (Barremian)		France	A nautilid, a species of Heminautilus.	
Hibolithes keleptrishvilii	Sp nov	Valid	Janssen, Clément & Bont	Early Cretaceous (latest Hauterivian)		France; Georgia; Hungary? Slovakia?	A mesohibolitid belemnite, a species of Hibolithes.	
Holcobelus elmii	Sp nov	Valid	Weis, Mariotti & Riegraf	Middle Jurassic (early Bajocian)		Algeria; France; Italy; Morocco	A holcobelid belemnite, a species of Holcobelus.	
Mesohibolites anglesensis	Sp. nov	Valid	Janssen, Clément & Bont	Early Cretaceous (late Barremian to early Bedoulian)		Abkhazia; France; Slovakia?	A mesohibolitid belemnite, a species of Mesohibolites.	
Reitneriteuthis	Gen. et comb. nov	Valid	Schweigert & Fuchs	Norian		Germany	A new genus for "Loligosepia" neidernachensis Reitner, 1978.	
Shvetsovia	Gen. et comb. nov	Valid	Janssen, Clément & Bont	Early Cretaceous (Barremian)		Azerbaijan; Bulgaria; Czech Republic; France; Georgia; Hungary; Romania; Russia; Ukraine; Slovakia?	A mesohibolitid belemnite, a new genus for "Hibolites" gagricus Shvetsov (1913) and a few other species.	
Sichuanobelus utatsuensis	Sp nov	Valid	Iba et al.	Early Jurassic (Hettangian)		Japan	A sinobelemnitid belemnite, a species of Sichuanobelus.	

== Newly named gastropods ==
Name	Novelty	Status	Authors	Age	Unit	Location	Notes	Images
Achatina sculpturata	Sp. nov	Valid	Neubert & van Damme	Eocene (late Priabonian)	Zalumah Formation	Oman	An achatinid gastropod, a species of Achatina.	
Acilia? basistriata	Sp. nov	Valid	Nützel, Aghababalou & Senowbari-Daryan	Late Triassic (Norian)	Nayband Formation	Iran	A prostyliferid gastropod, possibly a species of Acilia.	
Acteonina koizumii	Sp. nov	Valid	Nützel & Nakazawa	Permian (Capitanian)	Akasaka Limestone	Japan	A member of Acteoninidae, a species of Acteonina.	
Admetula valientensis	Sp. nov	Valid	Landau, Petit & Da Silva	Miocene (Messinian)	Nancy Point Formation	Panama	A cancellariid gastropod, a species of Admetula.	
Agatrix agathe	Sp. nov	Valid	Landau, Petit & Da Silva	Miocene	Gatun Formation	Panama	A cancellariid gastropod, a species of Agatrix.	
Akasakiella	Gen. et comb. nov	Valid	Nützel & Nakazawa	Permian (Capitanian)	Akasaka Limestone	Japan	A member of Goniasmatidae; a new genus for "Murchisonia" yabei Hayasaka (1943).	
Alvania laurae	Sp. nov	Valid	Brunetti & Vecchi	Pleistocene		Italy	A species of Alvania.	
Alvania leopardiana	Sp. nov	Valid	Brunetti & Vecchi	Pleistocene		Italy	A species of Alvania.	
Alvania nitida	Sp. nov	Valid	Brunetti & Vecchi	Pleistocene		Italy	A species of Alvania.	
Alvania pseudohispidula	Sp. nov	Valid	Brunetti & Vecchi	Pleistocene		Italy	A species of Alvania.	
Alvania ziliolii	Sp. nov	Valid	Brunetti & Vecchi	Pleistocene		Italy	A species of Alvania.	
Ameranna minuscula	Sp. nov	Valid	Landau & Vermeij	Early Pliocene	Gurabo Formation	Dominican Republic	A member of Buccinidae, a species of Ameranna.	
Ameranna primitiva	Sp. nov	Valid	Landau & Vermeij	Miocene (late Burdigalian)	Cantaure Formation	Venezuela	A member of Buccinidae, a species of Ameranna.	
Amphitrochus balinensis	Sp. nov	Valid	Gründel	Middle Jurassic		Poland	A turbinid, a species of Amphitrochus.	
Amphitrochus kahlenbergensis	Sp. nov	Valid	Gründel et al.	Middle Jurassic		Germany	A member of Nododelphinulidae; originally described as a species of Amphitrochus, subsequently transferred to the genus Nododelphinula.	
Ananias riccardii	Sp. nov	Valid	Pinilla	Early Permian		Argentina	An eotomariid gastropod, a species of Ananias.	
Anematina parva	Sp. nov	Valid	Nützel & Nakazawa	Permian (Capitanian)	Akasaka Limestone	Japan	A member of Elasmonematidae, a species of Anematina.	
Angulasina	Gen. et comb. nov	Valid	Gründel	Middle Jurassic		Western Europe	A pseudomelaniid gastropod, a new genus for "Chemnitzia" heterocycla Eudes-Deslongchamps (1866) and a few other species.	
Anomphalus japonicus	Sp. nov	Valid	Nützel & Nakazawa	Permian (Capitanian)	Akasaka Limestone	Japan	A member of Anomphalidae, a species of Anomphalus.	
Anoptychia? luxemburgensis	Sp. nov	Valid	Gründel	Early Bajocian		Luxembourg	An anoptychiid gastropod, possibly a species of Anoptychia.	
Aphera aphrodite	Sp. nov	Valid	Landau, Petit & Da Silva	Miocene	Gatun Formation	Panama	A cancellariid gastropod, a species of Aphera.	
Aphera bananensis	Sp. nov	Valid	Landau et al.	Pliocene (early Piacenzian)	Rio Banano Formation	Costa Rica	A species of Aphera.	
Aphera trophis	Sp. nov	Valid	Landau, Petit & Da Silva	Pliocene (Zanclean)	Cayo Agua Formation	Panama	A cancellariid gastropod, a species of Aphera.	
Araeonema panthalassica	Sp. nov	Valid	Nützel & Nakazawa	Permian (Capitanian)	Akasaka Limestone	Japan	A member of Araeonematidae, a species of Araeonema.	
Asamiella	Gen. et comb. nov	Valid	Nützel & Nakazawa	Permian (Capitanian)	Akasaka Limestone	Japan	A member of Neritariidae; a new genus for "Naticella" japonica Hayasaka (1943).	
Axelella casacantaurana	Sp. nov	Valid	Landau et al.	Late early Miocene	Cantaure Formation	Venezuela	A species of Axelella.	
Axelella cativa	Sp. nov	Valid	Landau, Petit & Da Silva	Miocene	Gatun Formation	Panama	A cancellariid gastropod, a species of Axelella.	
Axelella nutrita	Sp. nov	Valid	Landau et al.	Pleistocene	Armuelles Formation	Panama	A species of Axelella.	
Bahiensis priscus	Sp. nov	Valid	Cabrera & Martínez	Paleocene	Queguay Formation	Uruguay	An odontostomid gastropod, a species of Bahiensis.	
Barycypraea quadrinodosa	Sp. nov	Valid	Fehse	Miocene (Serravallian)		Indonesia	A species of Barycypraea.	
Bathrotomaria carinata	Sp. nov	Valid	Gründel & Hostettler	Middle Jurassic (Callovian)		Switzerland	A species of Bathrotomaria.	
Bivetiella dilatata	Sp. nov	Valid	Landau, Petit & Da Silva	Miocene	Gatun Formation	Panama	A cancellariid gastropod, a species of Bivetiella.	
Bivetopsia porvenirensis	Sp. nov	Valid	Landau et al.	Middle Miocene	El Porvenir beds	Venezuela	A species of Bivetopsia.	
Brasilennea guttula	Sp nov	Valid	Salvador & Simone	Paleocene	Itaboraí Formation	Brazil	A cerionid gastropod.	
Bulinus corici	Sp nov	Valid	Harzhauser & Neubauer in Harzhauser et al.	Middle Miocene	Feistring Formation	Austria	A species of Bulinus.	
Cancellaria axelolssoni	Sp. nov	Valid	Landau, Petit & Da Silva	Pliocene (Zanclean)	Cayo Agua Formation	Panama	A cancellariid gastropod, a species of Cancellaria.	
Cancellaria harzhauseri	Sp. nov	Valid	Landau, Petit & Da Silva	Miocene	Gatun Formation	Panama	A cancellariid gastropod, a species of Cancellaria.	
Cancellaria isabelae	Sp. nov	Valid	Landau, Petit & Da Silva	Pliocene	Cayo Agua Formation; Bowden Formation?	Panama; Jamaica?	A cancellariid gastropod, a species of Cancellaria.	
Cancellaria mixta	Sp. nov	Valid	Landau, Petit & Da Silva	Miocene	Gatun Formation	Panama	A cancellariid gastropod, a species of Cancellaria.	
Cancellaria pilula	Sp. nov	Valid	Landau, Petit & Da Silva	Miocene (Messinian)	Nancy Point Formation	Panama	A cancellariid gastropod, a species of Cancellaria.	
Cancellaria sepulcralis	Sp. nov	Valid	Landau et al.	Late Miocene	Caujarao Formation	Venezuela	A species of Cancellaria.	
Cancellaria stri	Sp. nov	Valid	Landau, Petit & Da Silva	Pleistocene (Gelasian)	Escudo de Veraguas Formation	Panama	A cancellariid gastropod, a species of Cancellaria.	
Carinaria maempeli	Sp. nov	Valid	Janssen	Miocene (Langhian)		Malta	A member of Carinariidae, a species of Carinaria.	
Cavolinia gatti	Sp. nov	Valid	Janssen	Miocene		Italy; Malta	A member of Cavoliniidae, a species of Cavolinia.	
Cavolinia microbesitas	Sp. nov	Valid	Janssen	Miocene (Langhian)		Malta	A member of Cavoliniidae, a species of Cavolinia.	
Cerastus praeinsularis	Sp. nov	Valid	Neubert & van Damme	Eocene (late Priabonian)	Zalumah Formation	Oman	A cerastid gastropod, a species of Cerastus.	
Cerastus pseudoena	Sp. nov	Valid	Neubert & van Damme	Eocene (late Priabonian)	Zalumah Formation	Oman	A cerastid gastropod, a species of Cerastus.	
Cerithioides angulatum	Sp. nov	Valid	Nützel & Nakazawa	Permian (Capitanian)	Akasaka Limestone	Japan	A member of Goniasmatidae, a species of Cerithioides.	
Cerithiozone	Gen. et sp. nov	Valid	Nützel & Nakazawa	Permian (Capitanian)	Akasaka Limestone	Japan	A member of Goniasmatidae. The type species is Cerithiozone ornata.	
Cidarina lenzaniyeuensis	Sp. nov	Valid	Del Rio	Early Paleocene (early Danian)	Roca Formation	Argentina	A species of Cidarina.	
Clio merijni	Sp. nov	Valid	Janssen	Oligocene (Chattian)		Malta	A species of Clio.	
Clio vilis	Sp. nov	Valid	Janssen	Oligocene (Chattian)		Malta	A species of Clio.	
Clione? ignota	Sp. nov	Valid	Janssen	Oligocene and Miocene		Italy; Malta	A member of Clionidae, possibly a species of Clione.	
Clione? imdinaensis	Sp. nov	Valid	Janssen	Miocene		Italy; Malta	A member of Clionidae, possibly a species of Clione.	
Clione? phosphorita	Sp. nov	Valid	Janssen	Oligocene		Italy; Malta	A member of Clionidae, possibly a species of Clione.	
Clione? tripartita	Sp. nov	Valid	Janssen	Miocene (Langhian)		Malta	A member of Clionidae, possibly a species of Clione.	
Clione? tumidula	Sp. nov	Valid	Janssen	Oligocene and Miocene		Italy; Malta	A member of Clionidae, possibly a species of Clione.	
Coeloconulus	Gen. et sp. nov	Valid	Nützel & Nakazawa	Permian (Capitanian)	Akasaka Limestone	Japan	A member of Trochidae. The type species is Coeloconulus panae.	
Cossmannina	Gen. et comb. nov	Valid	Gründel & Nützel	Early Jurassic (Pliensbachian)		Germany	A member of Architectibranchia belonging to the family Tubiferidae. The type species is "Actaeonina" abdominiformis Schröder (1995).	
Costataenia	Gen. et sp. nov	Valid	Nützel & Nakazawa	Permian (Capitanian)	Akasaka Limestone	Japan	A member of Goniasmatidae. The type species is Costataenia hayasakai.	
Costatrochus laubei	Sp. nov	Valid	Gründel	Middle Jurassic		Poland	A member of Nododelphinulidae. Originally described as a species of Costatrochus; subsequently made the type species of a separate genus Laubetrochus by Gründel & Hostettler (2014).	
Creseis curta	Sp. nov	Valid	Janssen	Miocene		Malta	A member of Cavolinioidea belonging to the family Creseidae, a species of Creseis.	
Cryptaulax redelii	Sp. nov	Valid	Ferrari	Pliensbachian or Toarcian		Argentina	A procerithiid caenogastropod, a species of Cryptaulax.	
Cyclotopsis praecursor	Sp. nov	Valid	Neubert & van Damme	Eocene (late Priabonian)	Zalumah Formation	Oman	A pomatiid gastropod. Originally described as a species of Cyclotopsis; subsequently made the type species of a separate genus Omanitopsis.	
Cypraedia aillana	Sp. nov	Valid	Pacaud & Ledon	Eocene (Bartonian)		France	A species of Cypraedia.	
Cypraedia blaiaensis	Sp. nov	Valid	Pacaud & Ledon	Eocene (Bartonian)		France	A species of Cypraedia.	
Cypraedia bouilloni	Sp. nov	Valid	Gain, Le Renard & Belliard	Eocene		France	A species of Cypraedia.	
Cypraedia coartata	Sp. nov	Valid	Gain, Le Renard & Belliard	Eocene (Lutetian)	Paris Basin	France	A species of Cypraedia.	
Cypraedia concinna	Sp. nov	Valid	Gain, Le Renard & Belliard	Eocene (Lutetian)	Paris Basin	France	A species of Cypraedia.	
Cypraedia yolandae	Sp. nov	Valid	Gain, Le Renard & Belliard	Eocene		France	A species of Cypraedia.	
Cypraeerato badenica	Sp. nov	Valid	Fehse & Grego	Miocene		France; Hungary	A member of Trivioidea belonging to the family Eratoidae, a species of Cypraeerato.	
Cypraeerato yolandae	Sp. nov	Valid	Fehse & Grego	Miocene		Hungary; Poland	A member of Trivioidea belonging to the family Eratoidae, a species of Cypraeerato.	
Diacrolinia pumilionis	Sp. nov	Valid	Janssen	Miocene (Burdigalian)		Malta	A member of Cavoliniidae, a species of Diacrolinia.	
Domerionina	Gen. et comb. nov	Valid	Gründel & Nützel	Early Jurassic (Pliensbachian)		Germany	A member of Architectibranchia belonging to the family Tubiferidae. The type species is "Actaeonina" domeria Gründel & Nützel (1998).	
Eginea	Gen. et comb. nov	Valid	Pacaud & Harzhauser	Eocene (Ypresian)		France; Spain	A pachychilid gastropod. A new genus for "Melanopsis" ornata Deshayes (1862); genus also contains "Melania" almerae Vidal in Cossmann (1898).	
Ellatrivia goudeyi	Sp. nov	Valid	Fehse & Grego	Pleistocene	Memana Formation	Australia	A member of Triviidae, a species of Ellatrivia.	
Emmericia roetzeli	sp nov	Valid	Harzhauser & Neubauer in Harzhauser et al.	Middle Miocene	Feistring Formation	Austria	A species of Emmericia.	
Engina cantaurana	Sp. nov	Valid	Landau & Vermeij	Miocene (late Burdigalian)	Cantaure Formation	Venezuela	A member of Buccinidae, a species of Engina.	
Engina gigas	Sp. nov	Valid	Landau & Vermeij	Miocene and Pliocene	Cercado Formation; Gurabo Formation	Dominican Republic	A member of Buccinidae, a species of Engina.	
Engina latior	Sp. nov	Valid	Landau & Vermeij	Miocene and Pliocene	Cercado Formation; Gurabo Formation	Dominican Republic	A member of Buccinidae, a species of Engina.	
Engina moinensis	Sp. nov	Valid	Landau & Vermeij	Pleistocene	Ground Creek Formation; Moin Formation; Swan Cay Formation	Costa Rica; Panama	A member of Buccinidae, a species of Engina.	
Eoborus rotundus	Sp. nov	Valid	Salvador & Simone	Paleocene	Itaboraí Formation	Brazil	A strophocheilid gastropod, a species of Eoborus.	
Eocypraea gibbosula	Sp. nov	Valid	Gain, Le Renard & Belliard	Eocene		France		
Eosassia	Gen. et comb. nov	Valid	Bandel & Dockery	Late Cretaceous (Campanian)		United States	A member of Cassoidea/Tonnoidea, a new genus for "Gyrineum" gwinae Dockery (1993).	
Eotrivia cristata	Sp. nov	Valid	Checchi, Zamberlan & Alberti	Eocene (late Ypresian/early Lutetian)		Italy	A member of the family Ovulidae.	
Etalotrochus	Gen. et sp. nov	Valid	Gründel et al.	Middle Jurassic		Germany	A member of Nododelphinulidae. Genus includes the new species Etalotrochus latus.	
Euclia alacertata	Sp. nov	Valid	Landau, Petit & Da Silva	Miocene	Gatun Formation	Panama	A cancellariid gastropod, a species of Euclia.	
Eucypraedia brasili radius	Subsp. nov	Valid	Gain, Le Renard & Belliard	Eocene		France		
Eucypraedia georgii metula	Subsp. nov	Valid	Gain, Le Renard & Belliard	Eocene		France		
Eucypraedia (Pacaudia)	Subgen. et sp. nov	Valid	Gain, Le Renard & Belliard	Eocene		France	The subgenus includes new species Eucypraedia (Pacaudia) expolita.	
Eucypraedia stilla	Sp. nov	Valid	Gain, Le Renard & Belliard	Eocene		France		
Eucypraedia tessonorum	Sp. nov	Valid	Gain, Le Renard & Belliard	Eocene		France		
Europrotomus	Gen. et comb. nov	Valid	Kronenberg & Harzhauser	Miocene		Europe	A strombid caenogastropod, a new genus for "Strombus" schroeckingeri. Strombus almerai (Crosse, 1885) may be a second species.	
Faxetrochus	Gen. et sp. nov	Valid	Schnetler & Lozouet	Paleocene (middle Danian)	Corallian Limestone	Denmark	A possible member of Porcelliidae. The type species is Faxetrochus problematicus.	
Ferrissia crenellata	sp nov	Valid	Harzhauser & Neubauer in Harzhauser et al.	Middle Miocene	Feistring Formation	Austria	A species of Ferrissia.	
Gamopleura pilula	Sp. nov	Valid	Janssen	Miocene (Burdigalian)		Malta	A member of Cavoliniidae, a species of Gamopleura.	
Goniasma fortecarinata	Sp. nov	Valid	Nützel & Nakazawa	Permian (Capitanian)	Akasaka Limestone	Japan	A member of Goniasmatidae, a species of Goniasma.	
Goniasma? nodifera	Sp. nov	Valid	Nützel & Nakazawa	Permian (Capitanian)	Akasaka Limestone	Japan	A member of Goniasmatidae, possibly a species of Goniasma.	
Gyraulus sachsenhoferi	sp nov	Valid	Harzhauser & Neubauer in Harzhauser et al.	Middle Miocene	Feistring Formation	Austria	A species of Gyraulus.	
Gyroscala daniana	Sp. nov	Valid	Del Rio	Early Paleocene (early Danian)	Roca Formation	Argentina	A species of Gyroscala.	
Heliconoides vonhachti	Sp. nov	Valid	Janssen	Pliocene (Zanclean)		France	A member of Limacinidae, a species of Heliconoides.	
Heliconoides wardijaensis	Sp. nov	Valid	Janssen	Oligocene (Chattian)		Malta	A member of Limacinidae, a species of Heliconoides.	
Hemipolygona carrizalensis	Sp. nov	Valid	Landau & Vermeij	Late Miocene	Caujarao Formation	Venezuela	A species of Hemipolygona.	
Hemipolygona snyderi	Sp. nov	Valid	Landau & Vermeij	Miocene (late Burdigalian)	Cantaure Formation	Venezuela	A species of Hemipolygona.	
Hertleinia obeliscus	Sp. nov	Valid	Landau et al.	Late Miocene	Caujarao Formation	Venezuela	A species of Hertleinia.	
Heterosubulites fusiformis	Sp. nov	Valid	Nützel & Nakazawa	Permian (Capitanian)	Akasaka Limestone	Japan	A member of Heterosubulitidae, a species of Heterosubulites.	
Heteroterma carmeloi	Sp. nov	Valid	Del Rio	Early Paleocene (early Danian)	Roca Formation	Argentina	A species of Heteroterma.	
Hippochrenes teodorii	Sp. nov	Valid	Pacaud & Goret	Paleocene (Thanetian)		France	A member of the family Rostellariidae.	
Jponsia	Gen. et comb. nov	Valid	Pacaud & Harzhauser	Paleocene to Eocene (Thanetian to Bartonian)		France; Italy	A pachychilid gastropod. A new genus for "Melania" cuvieri Deshayes (1825); genus also contains "Cerithium" undosum Brongniart (1823), "Melanopsis" dufresnii Deshayes (1825), "Cerithium" geslini Deshayes (1833) and "Muricites" vulcanicus von Schlotheim (1820).	
Johnjagtia baharensis	Sp. nov	Valid	Janssen	Oligocene (Chattian)		France; Malta	A member of Cavolinioidea belonging to the family Cuvierinidae, a species of Johnjagtia.	
Kaneconcha	Gen. et sp. nov	Disputed	Kaim, Tucholke & Warén	Late Pliocene		Mid-Atlantic Ridge, Atlantic Ocean	A provannid gastropod. The type species is Kaneconcha knorri. Considered to be a junior synonym of the species Janthina chavani (Ludbrook, 1978) by Beu (2017).	
Knightella hydrobiformis	Sp. nov	Valid	Nützel & Nakazawa	Permian (Capitanian)	Akasaka Limestone	Japan	A member of Orthonemidae, a species of Knightella.	
Lamarckofusus	Gen. et comb. nov	Valid	Vermeij & Lozouet	Eocene		France; Italy; Peru	A member of the family Fasciolariidae. The type species is "Fusus" subcarinatus Lamarck (1803).	
Lanistes thaytinitiensis	Sp. nov	Valid	Neubert & van Damme	Eocene (late Priabonian)	Zalumah Formation	Oman	An ampullariid gastropod. Originally described as a species of Lanistes; subsequently made the type species of a separate genus Carnevalea.	
Lanistes tricarinatus	Sp. nov	Valid	Neubert & van Damme	Eocene (late Priabonian)	Zalumah Formation	Oman	An ampullariid gastropod, a species of Lanistes.	
Limacina ernstkittli	Sp. nov	Valid	Janssen	Oligocene (Chattian)		Germany; Malta	A member of Limacinidae, a species of Limacina.	
Limicolaria omanensis	Sp. nov	Valid	Neubert & van Damme	Eocene (late Priabonian)	Zalumah Formation	Oman	A member of Stylommatophora belonging to the family Vidaliellidae. Originally described as a species of Limicolaria; subsequently made the type species of a separate genus Arabicolaria.	
Massyla corpulenta	Sp. nov	Valid	Landau, Petit & Da Silva	Miocene (Messinian)	Nancy Point Formation	Panama	A cancellariid gastropod, a species of Massyla.	
Massyla gavilanensis	Sp. nov	Valid	Landau et al.	Early Pliocene	Punta Gavilán Formation	Venezuela	A species of Massyla.	
Massyla toulai	Sp. nov	Valid	Landau, Petit & Da Silva	Miocene	Gatun Formation	Panama	A cancellariid gastropod, a species of Massyla.	
Mathilda quadricostata	Sp. nov	Valid	Gründel et al.	Middle Jurassic		Germany	A member of Mathildidae, a species of Mathilda.	
Medfrazyga convexa	Sp. nov	Valid	Nützel & Nakazawa	Permian (Capitanian)	Akasaka Limestone	Japan	A member of Palaeozygopleuridae, a species of Medfrazyga.	
Medfrazyga rectecostata	Sp. nov	Valid	Nützel & Nakazawa	Permian (Capitanian)	Akasaka Limestone	Japan	A member of Palaeozygopleuridae, a species of Medfrazyga.	
Microfulgur concheyroae	Sp. nov	Valid	Del Rio	Early Paleocene (early Danian)	Roca Formation	Argentina	A species of Microfulgur.	
Moniquia	Gen. et comb. et sp. nov	Valid	Pacaud & Harzhauser	Eocene (Ypresian to Bartonian)		France; Italy	A pachychilid gastropod. A new genus for "Cerithium" suzanna d'Orbigny (1850); genus also contains "Melanatria" guanensis Pacaud (2007), "Cerithium" pyreniforme Deshayes (1833), "Faunus" boriesi Doncieux (1908), "Cerithium" spinosum ortheziana Grateloup (1846) (raised to the rank of a separate species Moniquia ortheziana), "Cerithium" camilli de Gregorio (1880), "Cerithium" verneuillii Rouault (1850), "Cerithium" vandenheckei Bellardi (1852), "Cerithium" fodicatum Bellardi (1852) and "Cerithium" vellicatum Bellardi (1852), as well as the new species Moniquia goreti.	
Montreuilbellona	Gen. et comb. nov	Valid	Gründel	Middle Jurassic		France; Poland	A member of Calliotropinae; a new genus for "Trochus" granarius Hébert & Eudes-Deslongchamps (1860)	
Myusurina	Gen. et comb. nov	Valid	Gründel	Middle Jurassic		France; Poland; United Kingdom	A spinilomatine aporrhaid. A new genus for "Rostellaria" myurus Eudes-Deslongchamps (1843); genus also contains "Alaria" herinacea Piette (1867), "Alaria" laevigata Morris & Lycett (1851) and "Alaria" sublaevigata Hudleston (1888).	
Nanochilina japonica	Sp. nov	Valid	Nützel & Nakazawa	Permian (Capitanian)	Akasaka Limestone	Japan	A species of Nanochilina.	
Narona wiedenmeyeri	Sp. nov	Valid	Landau et al.	Late early Miocene	Cantaure Formation	Venezuela	A species of Narona.	
Nematurella zuschini	sp nov	Valid	Harzhauser & Neubauer in Harzhauser et al.	Middle Miocene	Feistring Formation	Austria	A species of Nematurella.	
Neocolombellina	Gen. et comb. nov	Valid	Bandel & Dockery	Late Cretaceous		United States	A member of Cassoidea/Tonnoidea. Genus contains the type species Neocolombellina cancellata (Dockery, 1993), Neocolombellina americana (Wade, 1926) and Neocolombellina carlea (Dockery, 1993).	
Odontohydrobia groisenbachensis	sp nov	Valid	Harzhauser & Neubauer in Harzhauser et al.	Middle Miocene	Feistring Formation	Austria	A species of Odontohydrobia.	
Odontohydrobia pompatica	Sp nov	Valid	Harzhauser & Neubauer in Harzhauser et al.	Middle Miocene	Feistring Formation	Austria	A species of Odontohydrobia.	
Odontohydrobia styriaca	Sp nov	Valid	Harzhauser & Neubauer in Harzhauser et al.	Middle Miocene	Feistring Formation	Austria	A species of Odontohydrobia.	
Palaeostylus attenuatus	Sp. nov	Valid	Nützel & Nakazawa	Permian (Capitanian)	Akasaka Limestone	Japan	A species of Palaeostylus.	
Palaeostylus? irregularis	Sp. nov	Valid	Nützel & Nakazawa	Permian (Capitanian)	Akasaka Limestone	Japan	Possibly a species of Palaeostylus.	
Palaeostylus lateapicatus	Sp. nov	Valid	Nützel & Nakazawa	Permian (Capitanian)	Akasaka Limestone	Japan	A species of Palaeostylus.	
Palaeostylus minutus	Sp. nov	Valid	Nützel & Nakazawa	Permian (Capitanian)	Akasaka Limestone	Japan	A species of Palaeostylus.	
Peracle amberae	Sp. nov	Valid	Janssen	Oligocene (Chattian)		Malta	A member of Peraclidae, a species of Peracle.	
Peracle grebneffi	Sp. nov	Valid	Janssen	Miocene (Langhian)		Italy; Malta	A member of Peraclidae, a species of Peracle.	
Permocerithium	Gen. et sp. nov	Valid	Nützel & Nakazawa	Permian (Capitanian)	Akasaka Limestone	Japan	A member of Propupaspiridae. The type species is Permocerithium nudum.	
Planorbis austroalpinus	Sp nov	Valid	Harzhauser & Neubauer in Harzhauser et al.	Middle Miocene	Feistring Formation	Austria	A species of Planorbis.	
Polygona barbascoensis	Sp. nov	Valid	Landau & Vermeij	Miocene (late Burdigalian)	Cantaure Formation	Venezuela	A species of Polygona.	
Polygona buenevaraensis	Sp. nov	Valid	Landau & Vermeij	Late Miocene	Caujarao Formation	Venezuela	A species of Polygona.	
Polygona praeanapetes	Sp. nov	Valid	Landau & Vermeij	Miocene (late Burdigalian)	Cantaure Formation	Venezuela	A species of Polygona.	
Polygona sepulcralis	Sp. nov	Valid	Landau & Vermeij	Late Miocene	Caujarao Formation	Venezuela	A species of Polygona.	
Proacirsa angulata	Sp. nov	Valid	Gründel	Early Bajocian		Luxembourg	A gordenellid gastropod, a species of Anoptychia.	
Proadusta francki	Sp. nov	Valid	Gain, Le Renard & Belliard	Eocene		France	A member of the family Cypraeidae. Subsequently made the type species of the separate genus Romanekia.	
Proadusta procerior	Sp. nov	Valid	Gain, Le Renard & Belliard	Eocene		France		
Promathildia gedli	Sp. nov	Valid	Kaim	Middle Jurassic (Bathonian)		Poland	A member of Mathildidae.	
Protatlanta kbiraensis	Sp. nov	Valid	Janssen	Miocene (Langhian)		Italy; Malta	A member of Atlantidae, a species of Protatlanta.	
Procerithium (Infacerithum) nodosum	Sp. nov	Valid	Ferrari	Pliensbachian or Toarcian		Argentina	A procerithiid caenogastropod, a species of Procerithium.	
Procerithium (Rhabdocolpus) patagoniensis	Sp. nov	Valid	Ferrari	Pliensbachian or Toarcian		Argentina	A procerithiid caenogastropod, a species of Procerithium.	
Proconulus costatonodosus	Sp. nov	Valid	Gründel et al.	Middle Jurassic		Germany	A member of Proconulidae, a species of Proconulus.	
Protorcula iranica	Sp. nov	Valid	Nützel, Aghababalou & Senowbari-Daryan	Late Triassic (Norian)	Nayband Formation	Iran	A protorculid gastropod, a species of Protorcula.	
Protorcula permiana	Sp. nov	Valid	Nützel & Nakazawa	Permian (Capitanian)	Akasaka Limestone	Japan	A member of Protorculidae, a species of Protorcula.	
Pyruclia? schmidti	Sp. nov	Valid	Landau et al.	Late Miocene	Urumaco Formation	Venezuela	Possibly a species of Pyruclia.	
Pyruclia tweedledee	Sp. nov	Valid	Landau, Petit & Da Silva	Miocene	Gatun Formation	Panama	A cancellariid gastropod, a species of Pyruclia.	
Pyruclia tweedledum	Sp. nov	Valid	Landau, Petit & Da Silva	Miocene	Gatun Formation	Panama	A cancellariid gastropod, a species of Pyruclia.	
Rocalaria	Gen. et sp. nov	Valid	Del Rio	Early Paleocene (early Danian)	Roca Formation	Argentina	Possibly a member of Fasciolariidae. The type species is Rocalaria alani.	
Romania fastigata	Species	Valid	Harzhauser & Neubauer in Harzhauser et al.	Middle Miocene	Feistring Formation	Austria	A species of Romania.	
Rugalindrites	Nom. nov	Valid	Gründel & Nützel	Middle Jurassic		United Kingdom	A member of Architectibranchia belonging to the family Cylindrobullinidae; a replacement name for Cylindrites Morris & Lycett (1851).	
"Serradonta" kimberleyae	Sp. nov	Valid	Saether et al.	Miocene		New Zealand	A pectinodontid gastropod, possibly a species of Serradonta.	
Sinespirites	Gen. et comb. nov	Valid	Gründel & Nützel	Middle Jurassic (Bathonian)		France	A member of Architectibranchia belonging to the family Cylindrobullinidae. The type species is "Bulla" thorentea Buvignier in Sauvage & Buvignier (1842).	
Stagnicola reinholdkunzi	Sp nov	Valid	Harzhauser & Neubauer in Harzhauser et al.	Middle Miocene	Feistring Formation	Austria	A species of Stagnicola.	
Stegocoelia akasakaensis	Sp. nov	Valid	Nützel & Nakazawa	Permian (Capitanian)	Akasaka Limestone	Japan	A member of Goniasmatidae, a species of Stegocoelia.	
Streptacis orientalis	Sp. nov	Valid	Nützel & Nakazawa	Permian (Capitanian)	Akasaka Limestone	Japan	A species of Streptacis.	
Styliola schembriorum	Sp. nov	Valid	Janssen	Miocene (Langhian)		Italy; Malta	A member of Cavolinioidea belonging to the family Creseidae, a species of Styliola.	
Subepona promeces	Sp. nov	Valid	Pacaud & Ledon	Eocene (Bartonian)		France	A member of the family Cypraeidae belonging to the subfamily Erosariinae and the tribe Cyproglobinini.	
Succinea omanensis	Sp. nov	Valid	Neubert & van Damme	Eocene (late Priabonian)	Zalumah Formation	Oman	A succineid gastropod. Originally described as a species of Succinea; subsequently made the type species of a separate genus Eoquickia.	
Sulcobuccinum prominentum	Sp. nov	Valid	Del Rio	Early Paleocene (early Danian)	Roca Formation	Argentina	A species of Sulcobuccinum.	
Teutonica? natanzensis	Sp. nov	Valid	Nützel, Aghababalou & Senowbari-Daryan	Late Triassic (Norian)	Nayband Formation	Iran	A polygyrinid gastropod, possibly a species of Teutonica.	
Torusanina	Gen. et comb. nov	Valid	Gründel	Late Jurassic		Western Europe	A pseudomelaniid gastropod, a new genus for "Melania" heddingtonensis Sowerby (1813) and a few other species.	
Trilemma kremenkense	Sp. nov	Valid	Blagovetshenskiy in Blagovetshenskiy & Shumilkin	Early Cretaceous		Russia	A member of Aporrhaidae, a species of Trilemma.	
Trilemma polivnense	Sp. nov	Valid	Blagovetshenskiy in Blagovetshenskiy & Shumilkin	Early Cretaceous		Russia	A member of Aporrhaidae, a species of Trilemma.	
Trilemma tenuicarinatum	Sp. nov	Valid	Blagovetshenskiy in Blagovetshenskiy & Shumilkin	Early Cretaceous		Russia	A member of Aporrhaidae. Originally described as a species of Trilemma; Cataldo (2014) considered it to be a species of Ceratosiphon.	
Triloba pappi	Sp. nov	Valid	Schnabel	Late Miocene		Macedonia	A member of Clausiliidae. Originally described as a species of Triloba, but subsequently transferred to the genus Protriloba.	
Trivellona felixlorenzi	Sp. nov	Valid	Fehse & Grego	Middle Miocene	Fyansford Formation	Australia	A member of Triviidae, a species of Trivellona.	
Trochonodus permianus	Sp. nov	Valid	Nützel & Nakazawa	Permian (Capitanian)	Akasaka Limestone	Japan	A species of Trochonodus.	
Trochozonites arabica	Sp. nov	Valid	Neubert & van Damme	Eocene (late Priabonian)	Zalumah Formation	Oman	A helicarionid gastropod, a species of Trochozonites.	
Trypanocochlea parva	Sp. nov	Valid	Nützel & Nakazawa	Permian (Capitanian)	Akasaka Limestone	Japan	A species of Trypanocochlea.	
Tuberotropis	Gen. et sp. et comb. nov	Valid	Gründel et al.	Middle Jurassic		Germany	A member of Calliotropinae. Genus includes the new species Tuberotropis tuberosus, as well as "Littorina" staffelbergensis Kuhn (1938).	
Turbo fakaauensis	Sp. nov	Valid	Tröndlé & Letourneux	Pleistocene		French Polynesia	A species of Turbo.	
Vebericochlis mazaevi	Sp. nov	Valid	Nützel & Nakazawa	Permian (Capitanian)	Akasaka Limestone	Japan	A species of Vebericochlis.	
Ventrilia coatesi	Sp. nov	Valid	Landau, Petit & Da Silva	Miocene	Gatun Formation	Panama	A cancellariid gastropod, a species of Ventrilia.	
Ventrilia puntagavilanensis	Sp. nov	Valid	Landau et al.	Early Pliocene	Punta Gavilán Formation	Venezuela	A cancellariid gastropod, a species of Ventrilia.	
Yochelsonistylus	Gen. et 2 sp. nov	Valid	Nützel & Nakazawa	Permian (Capitanian)	Akasaka Limestone	Japan	A member of Orthonemidae. The type species is Yochelsonistylus felixi; genus also contains Yochelsonistylus seussae.	

== Other molluscs ==
Name	Novelty	Status	Authors	Age	Unit	Location	Notes	Images
Acila (Truncacila) castagni	Sp. nov	Valid	Forner i Valls	Early Cretaceous (Aptian)		Spain	A bivalve belonging to the family Nuculidae	
Amicula solivaga	Sp. nov	Valid	Vendrasco et al.	Pliocene	San Diego	United States	A chiton belonging to the family Mopaliidae, a species of Amicula	
Anetshella	Gen. et comb. nov	Valid	Mazaev	Middle Permian (Kazanian)		Russia	A member of Rostroconchia; a new genus for "Lepetopsis" golowkinskyi Netchaev (1894)	
Anodonta kobiwakoensis	Nom. nov	Valid	Baba & Matsukawa	Pliocene	Koka Formation	Japan	A species of Anodonta; a replacement name for Cucullaea ponderosa Yokoyama (1925)	
Aphanaia precursa	Sp. nov	Valid	González & Waterhouse	Carboniferous		Argentina	A bivalve, a species of Aphanaia	
Asoella campbellorum	Sp. nov	Valid	Damborenea in Damborenea & Manceñido	Late Triassic		Argentina	An asoellid bivalve, a species of Asoella	
Atomodesma? amleri	Sp. nov	Valid	González & Waterhouse	Carboniferous		Argentina	A bivalve, possibly a species of Atomodesma	
Callistochiton sphaerae	Sp. nov	Valid	Vendrasco et al.	Pliocene	San Diego	United States	A chiton belonging to the family Ischnochitonidae, a species of Callistochiton	
Erycina johnjagti	Sp nov	Valid	Marquet, Lenaerts & Laporte	Early Oligocene		Netherlands	A bivalve, a species of Erycina	
Eumorphotis ericius	Sp. nov	Valid	Hautmann et al.	Early Triassic (Olenekian)	Moenkopi	United States	A bivalve, a species of Eumorphotis	
Eumorphotis virginensis	Sp. nov	Valid	Hautmann et al.	Early Triassic (Olenekian)	Moenkopi	United States	A bivalve, a species of Eumorphotis	
Glycymeris (Chevronia) caproensae	Sp nov	Valid	Marquet, Lenaerts & Laporte	Early Oligocene		Belgium	A bivalve, a species of Glycymeris	
Hannestheronia	Gen. et sp. nov	Valid	Vinther et al.	Devonian		South Africa	A multiplacophoran. The type species is Hannestheronia australis.	
Kolymia astafievae	Sp. nov	Valid	Biakov	Permian (Wordian)		Russia	An Inoceramus-like bivalve belonging to the family Kolymiidae	
Kolymia churavtsovi	Sp. nov	Valid	Biakov	Permian (Roadian)	Beglyi	Russia	An Inoceramus-like bivalve belonging to the family Kolymiidae	
Kolymia gydanensis	Sp. nov	Valid	Biakov	Permian (Wordian)	Omolon	Russia	An Inoceramus-like bivalve belonging to the family Kolymiidae	
Kolymia milievskyi	Sp. nov	Valid	Biakov	Permian (Roadian)	Beglyi	Russia	An Inoceramus-like bivalve belonging to the family Kolymiidae	
Kolymia taskanica	Sp. nov	Valid	Biakov	Permian (Roadian)	Omolon	Russia	An Inoceramus-like bivalve belonging to the family Kolymiidae	
Kulindroplax	Gen. et sp. nov	Valid	Sutton et al.	Silurian	Herefordshire	United Kingdom	A member of Aplacophora. The type species is Kulindroplax perissokomos.	
Leionucula melvilleana	Sp. nov	Valid	Whittle et al.	Early Miocene	Cape Melville	Antarctica	A nuculid bivalve, a species of Leionucula	
Lepidozona kanakoffi	Sp. nov	Valid	Vendrasco et al.	Pliocene	San Diego	United States	A chiton belonging to the family Ischnochitonidae, a species of Lepidozona	
Leptochondria nuetzeli	Sp. nov	Valid	Hautmann et al.	Early Triassic (Olenekian)	Moenkopi	United States	A bivalve, a species of Leptochondria	
Limopsis (Pectunculina) albrechtvalki	Sp. nov	Valid	Marquet, Lenaerts & Laporte	Early Oligocene		Belgium	A bivalve, a species of Limopsis	
Limopsis demerei	Sp. nov	Valid	Squires	Late Cretaceous (late Campanian, possibly also early Maastrichtian)	Point Loma	United States	A bivalve belonging to the family Limopsidae, a species of Limopsis	
Oriocrassatella piauiensis	Sp. nov	Valid	Anelli et al.	Carboniferous (Bashkirian to Moscovian)	Piauí	Brazil	A crassatellid bivalve, a species of Oriocrassatella	
Palindonaia oligocenica	Sp. nov	Valid	Marquet, Lenaerts & Laporte	Early Oligocene		Belgium	A bivalve, a species of Palindonaia	
Parasarcolites sohli	Sp. nov	Valid	Mitchell et al.	Late Cretaceous (Maastrichtian)	El Rayo Formation	Jamaica; United States (Puerto Rico)	A rudist bivalve.	
Planikellya nassauensis	Sp. nov	Valid	Marquet, Lenaerts & Laporte	Early Oligocene		Belgium; Netherlands	A bivalve, a species of Planikellya	
Pleuromya prima	Sp. nov	Valid	Hautmann et al.	Early Triassic (Olenekian)	Moenkopi	United States	A bivalve, a species of Pleuromya	
Protobalanus spinicoronatus	Sp. nov	Valid	Vinther et al.	Devonian		United States	A multiplacophoran, a species of Protobalanus	
Pseudocatillus nevesskayae	Sp. nov	Valid	Esu & Popov	Late Messinian		Italy	A lymnocardiine cockle, a species of Pseudocatillus	
Pseudolimea riccardii	Sp. nov	Valid	Damborenea in Damborenea & Manceñido	Late Triassic		Argentina	A limid bivalve, a species of Pseudolimea	
Pterotrigonia flava	Sp. nov	Valid	Griffin & Valera	Cenomanian	Mata Amarilla	Argentina	A trigoniid bivalve, a species of Pterotrigonia	
Sementiconcha	Gen. et sp. nov	Valid	Hautmann et al.	Early Triassic (Olenekian)	Moenkopi	United States	A myophoricardiid bivalve. The type species is Sementiconcha recuperator.	
Steinmanella subquadrata	Sp. nov	Valid	Luci & Lazo	Early Cretaceous (Berriasian and Valanginian)	Quintuco; Vaca Muerta	Argentina	A bivalve belonging to the group Myophorelloidea and the family Steinmanellidae. Originally described as a species of Steinmanella, but subsequently transferred to the genus Garatella.	
