= Owenites (ammonite) =

Owenites Temporal range: Induan-Olenekian

Scientific classification
- Kingdom: Animalia
- Phylum: Mollusca
- Class: Cephalopoda
- Subclass: †Ammonoidea
- Order: †Ceratitida
- Family: †Melagathiceratidae
- Genus: †Owenites; Hyatt & Smith, 1905

Type species
- †Owenites koeneni Hyatt & Smith, 1905

Genus of molluscs (fossil)

Owenites is a genus of a ceratite ammonoid that lived during the Early Triassic.
