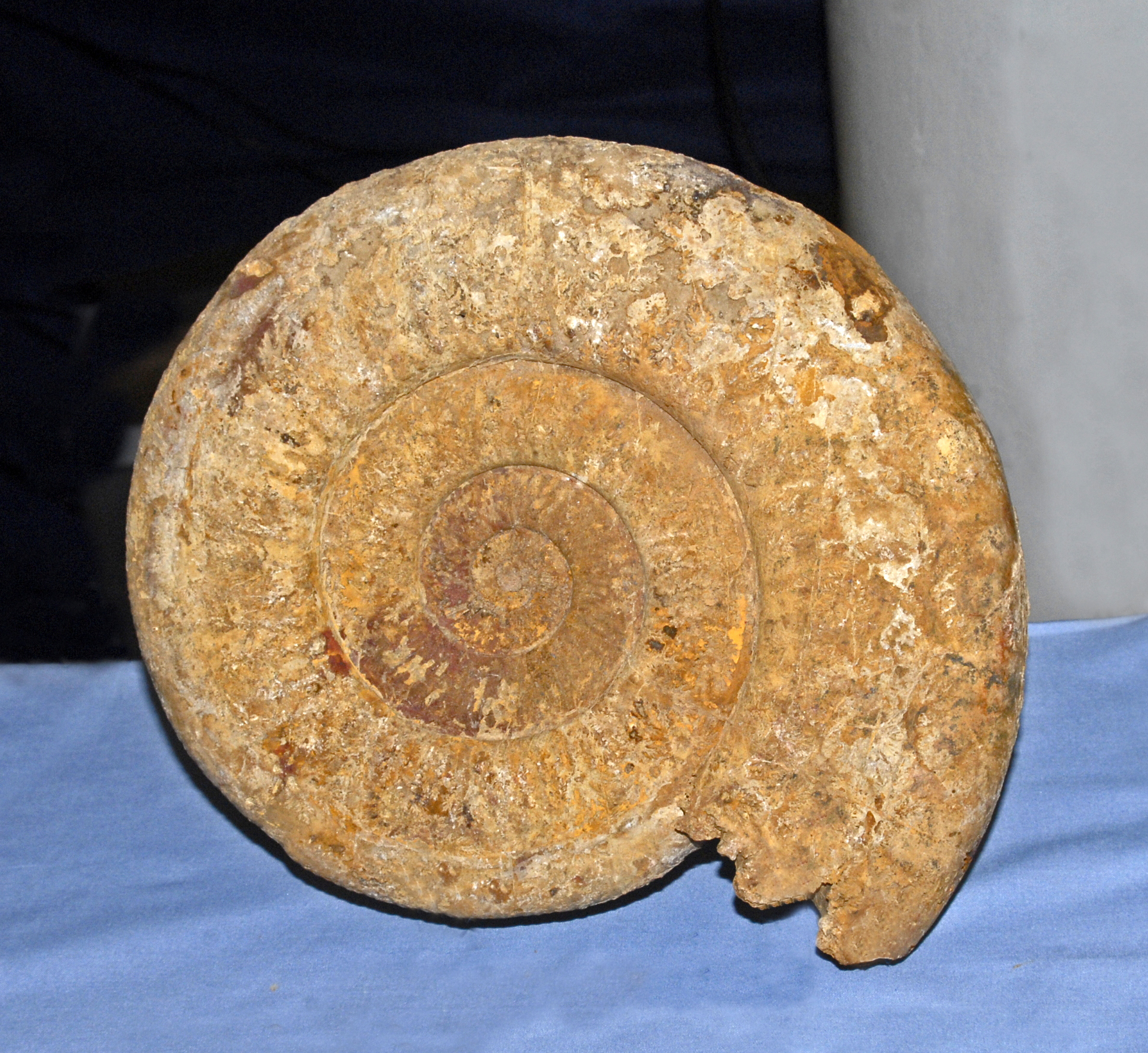
- Kranaosphinctes species from Madagascar, Oxfordian stage

Scientific classification
- Kingdom: Animalia
- Phylum: Mollusca
- Class: Cephalopoda
- Subclass: †Ammonoidea
- Order: †Ammonitida
- Family: †Perisphinctidae
- Genus: †Kranaosphinctes; Buckman, 1921

= Kranaosphinctes =

Kranaosphinctes Temporal range: Oxfordian

Genus of molluscs (fossil)

Kranaosphinctes is an extinct genus of ammonites belonging to the Perisphinctidae family. Some authors consider Kranaosphinctes a subgenus of the genus Perisphinctes.

== Fossil record ==
Fossils of Kranaosphinctes are found in marine strata of the Upper Jurassic (age range: from 161.2 to 155.7 million years ago.). Fossils are known from some localities of Europe, Argentina, India and Madagascar.
