= Crioceras (cephalopod) =

Crioceras Temporal range: Hauterivian

Scientific classification
- Kingdom: Animalia
- Phylum: Mollusca
- Class: Cephalopoda
- Order: †Ammonitida
- Family: †Crioceratitidae
- Genus: †Crioceras d'Orbigny, 1842

Species
- †Crioceras elegans Koenen, 1902; †Crioceras ramoseptum

Genus of molluscs (fossil)

Crioceras is an extinct cephalopod genus belonging to the subclass Ammonoidea and included in the family Crioceratidae of the ammonitid superfamily Ancylocerataceae. Crioceras is considered by some to be a junior synonym of Crioceratites

Crioceras ramoseptum is a heteromorph that comes from the Aptian of Dagestan.
