= Mesoteuthis =

Mesoteuthis Temporal range: Early Jurassic to Middle Jurassic, Toarcian–Bajocian

Scientific classification
- Kingdom: Animalia
- Phylum: Mollusca
- Class: Cephalopoda
- Superorder: †Belemnoidea
- Genus: †Mesoteuthis

Extinct genus of molluscs

Mesoteuthis is a genus of belemnite, an extinct group of cephalopods.

== Taxonomical history ==
A belemnite originally described as Cylindroteuthis confessa has been re-described as Mesoteuthis soloniensis.

== See also ==
- Belemnite
- List of belemnites
