= Nododelphinulidae =

Scientific classification
- Kingdom: Animalia
- Phylum: Mollusca
- Class: Gastropoda
- Subclass: Vetigastropoda
- Order: Trochida
- Superfamily: Trochoidea
- Family: †Nododelphinulidae; Cox, 1960

Extinct family of gastropods

Nododelphinulidae is an extinct family of fossil gastropods in the superfamily Trochoidea. This family has no subfamilies.

== Genera ==
Genera within the family Nododelphinulidae include:

- † Amphitrochus Cossmann, 1907
- † Costatrochus Gründel, 2009
- † Falsamotrochus Gründel & Hostettler, 2014
- † Helicacanthus Dacque, 1938
- † Laubetrochus Gründel & Hostettler, 2014
- † Nododelphinula Cossmann, 1916, the type genus
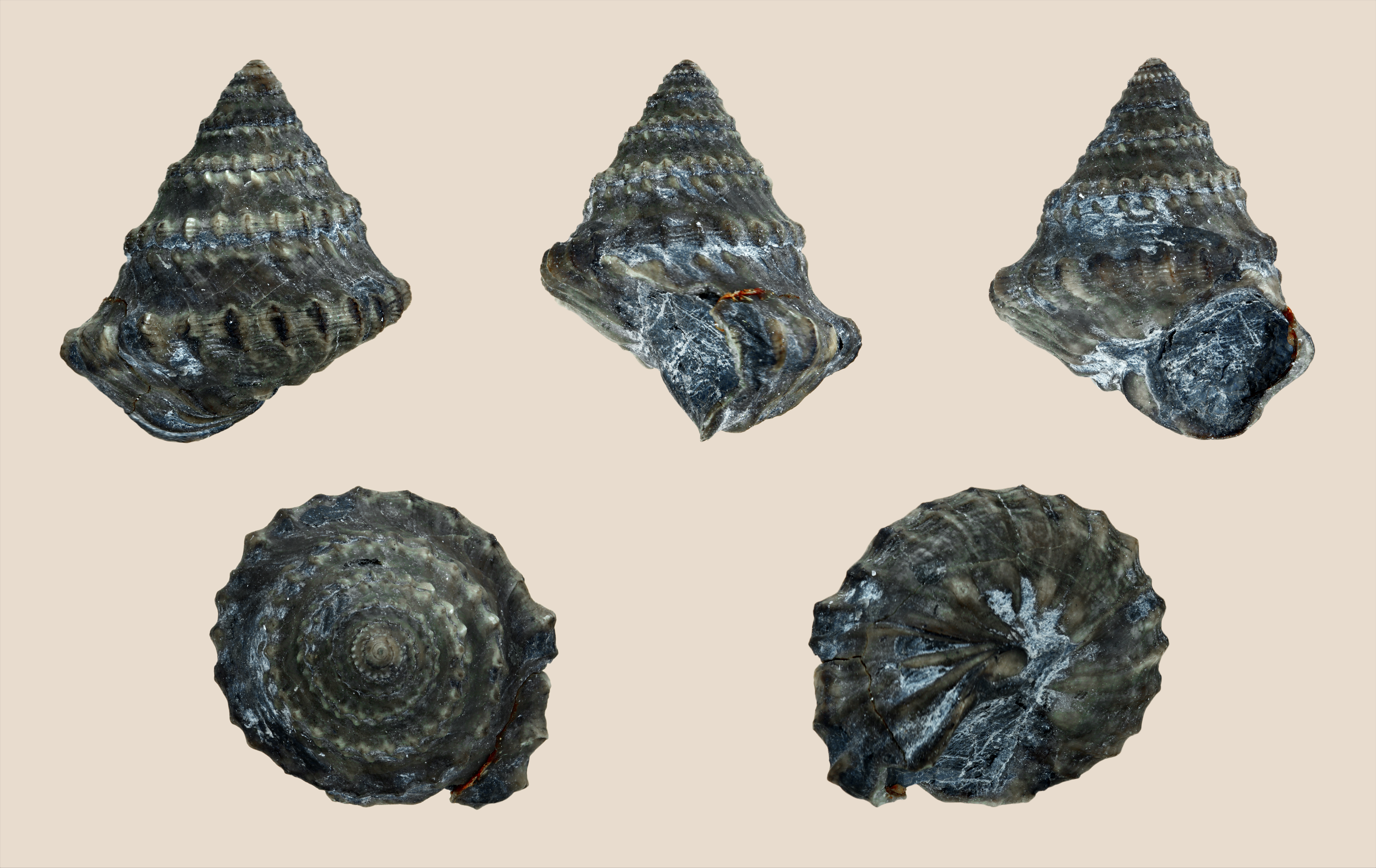
Costatrochus subduplicatus

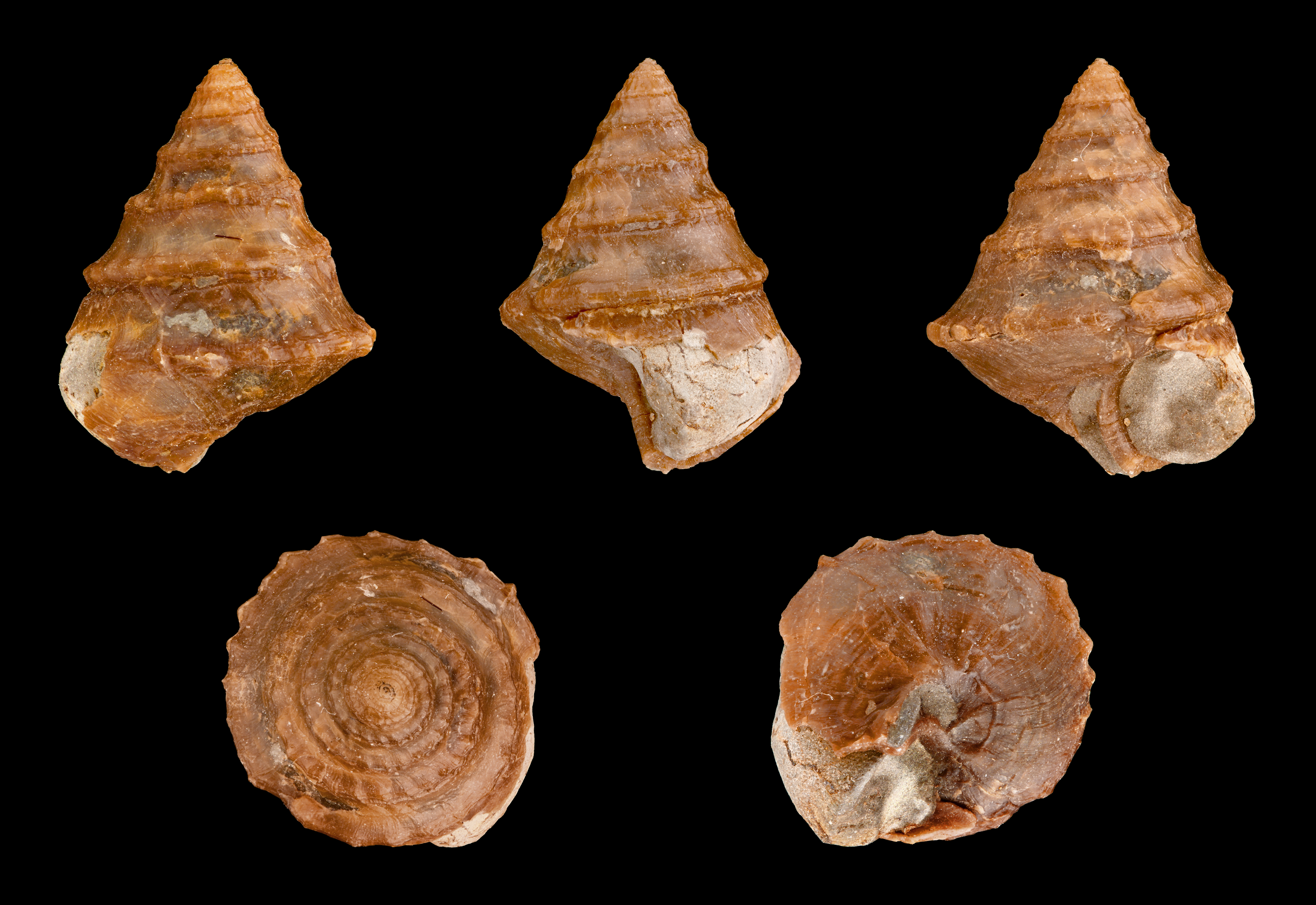
Costatrochus subduplicatus

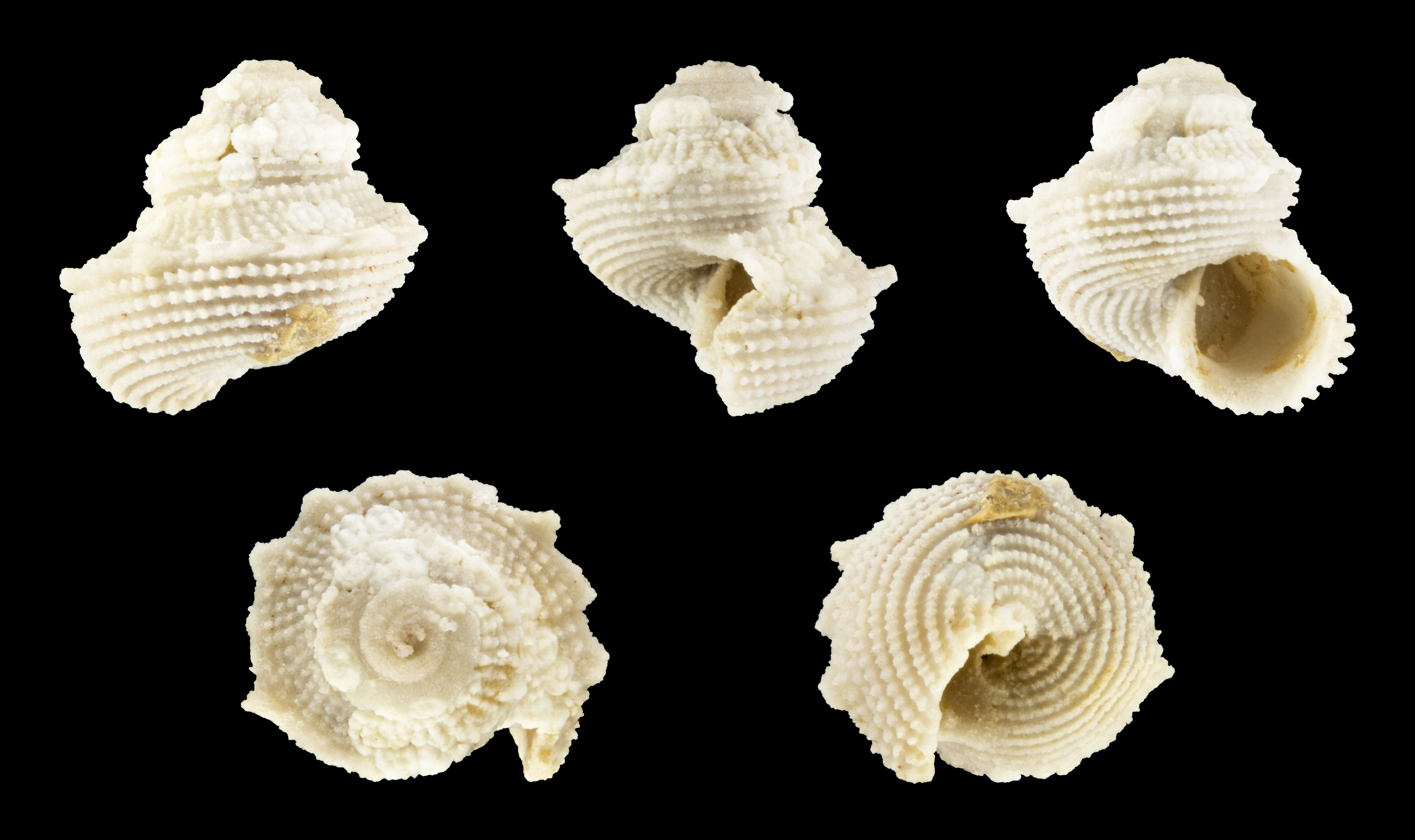
Helicacanthus tegulatus
