= Polygyrinidae =

Scientific classification
- Kingdom: Animalia
- Phylum: Mollusca
- Class: Gastropoda
- (unranked): clade Caenogastropoda
- Family: Polygyrinidae Bandel, 1993

Extinct family of gastropods

Polygyrinidae is an extinct family of fossil sea snails, marine gastropod molluscs in the clade Caenogastropoda.
