= Cypraedia =

Cypraedia Temporal range: 66.0–33.9 Ma

Scientific classification
- Kingdom: Animalia
- Phylum: Mollusca
- Class: Gastropoda
- Subclass: Caenogastropoda
- Order: Littorinimorpha
- Family: Ovulidae
- Subfamily: Pediculariinae
- Genus: †Cypraedia; Swainson 1840

Species
- †Cypraedia cancellata (type); †Cypraedia carmenensis Clark and Durham 1946; †Cypraedia chira Olsson 1931; †Cypraedia elegans Defrance 1826; †Cypraedia fenestralis Conrad 1833; †Cypraedia gizaensis Abbass 1967; †Cypraedia hyderabadensis Cox 1931; †Cypraedia ismaili Abbass 1967; †Cypraedia mariehelenae Celzard 2024; †Cypraedia reedi Abbass 1967

Extinct genus of gastropods

Cypraedia is an extinct genus of gastropods.

== See also ==
- List of marine gastropod genera in the fossil record
