= Schaffhauseria =

Schaffhauseria Temporal range: Hauterivian

Scientific classification
- Kingdom: Animalia
- Phylum: Mollusca
- Class: Cephalopoda
- Subclass: †Ammonoidea
- Order: †Ammonitida
- Suborder: †Ancyloceratina
- Family: †Hamulinidae
- Genus: †Schaffhauseria; Vermeulen & al., 2012

Type species
- Schaffhauseria schirollii Vermeulen & al., 2012

Species
- S. schirollii Vermeulen & al., 2012; S. veveysensis Vermeulen & al., 2012

Genus of ammonites

Schaffhauseria is a genus of ammonite from the Upper Hauterivian. Its fossils have been found in Switzerland and France.
