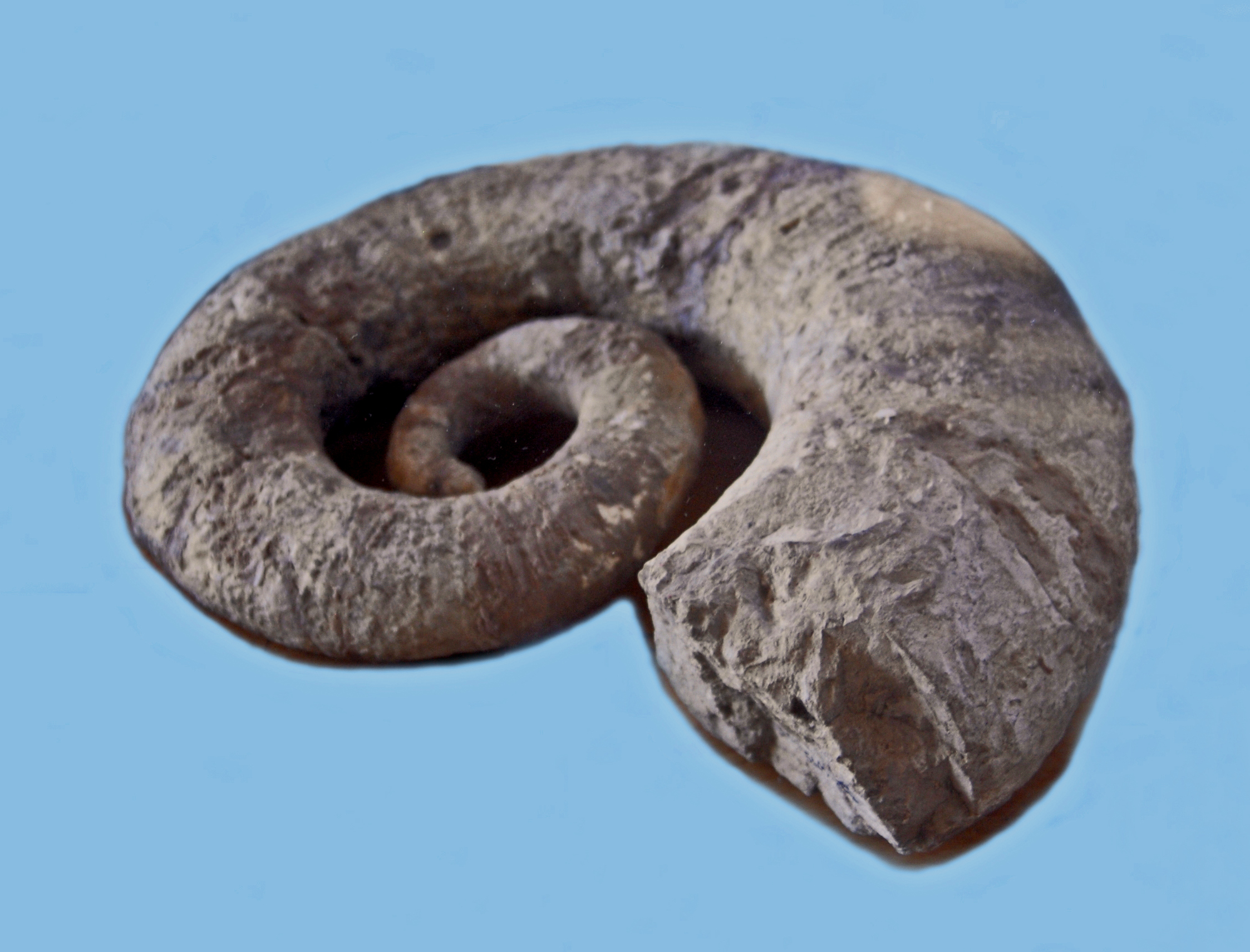
- Fossil of Emericiceras emericii from Alpes-de-Haute-Provence, on display at Galerie de paléontologie et d'anatomie comparée in Paris

Scientific classification
- Kingdom: Animalia
- Phylum: Mollusca
- Class: Cephalopoda
- Subclass: †Ammonoidea
- Order: †Ammonitida
- Suborder: †Ancyloceratina
- Family: †Crioceratitidae
- Genus: †Emericiceras; Sarka, 1954

= Emericiceras =

Emericiceras Temporal range: Cretaceous, 136.4–112.6 Ma

Emericiceras is an ammonite genus from the Early Cretaceous belonging to the Ancyloceratoidea. Emericiceras are considered by some authors a junior synonyms of Crioceratites.

== Distribution ==
Fossils of species within this genus have been found in the Cretaceous sediments of Antarctica, France, Hungary, Italy, Morocco, Slovakia, South Africa and Spain.

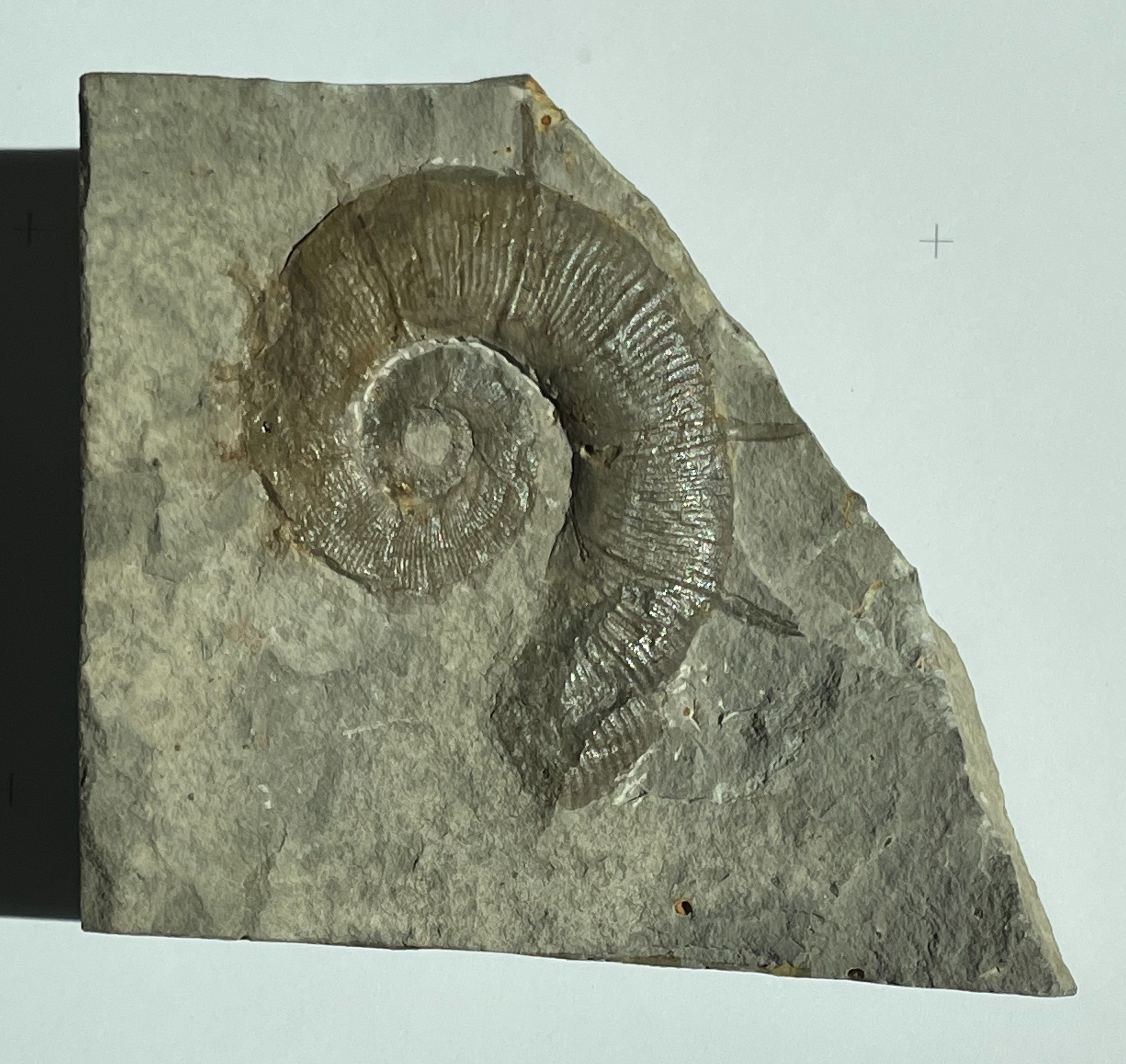
Emericiceras emerici aus de Clumanc, Basses Alpes, Frankreich, Cenomanium (Exemplar aus dem Naturkunde Museum Berlin)
