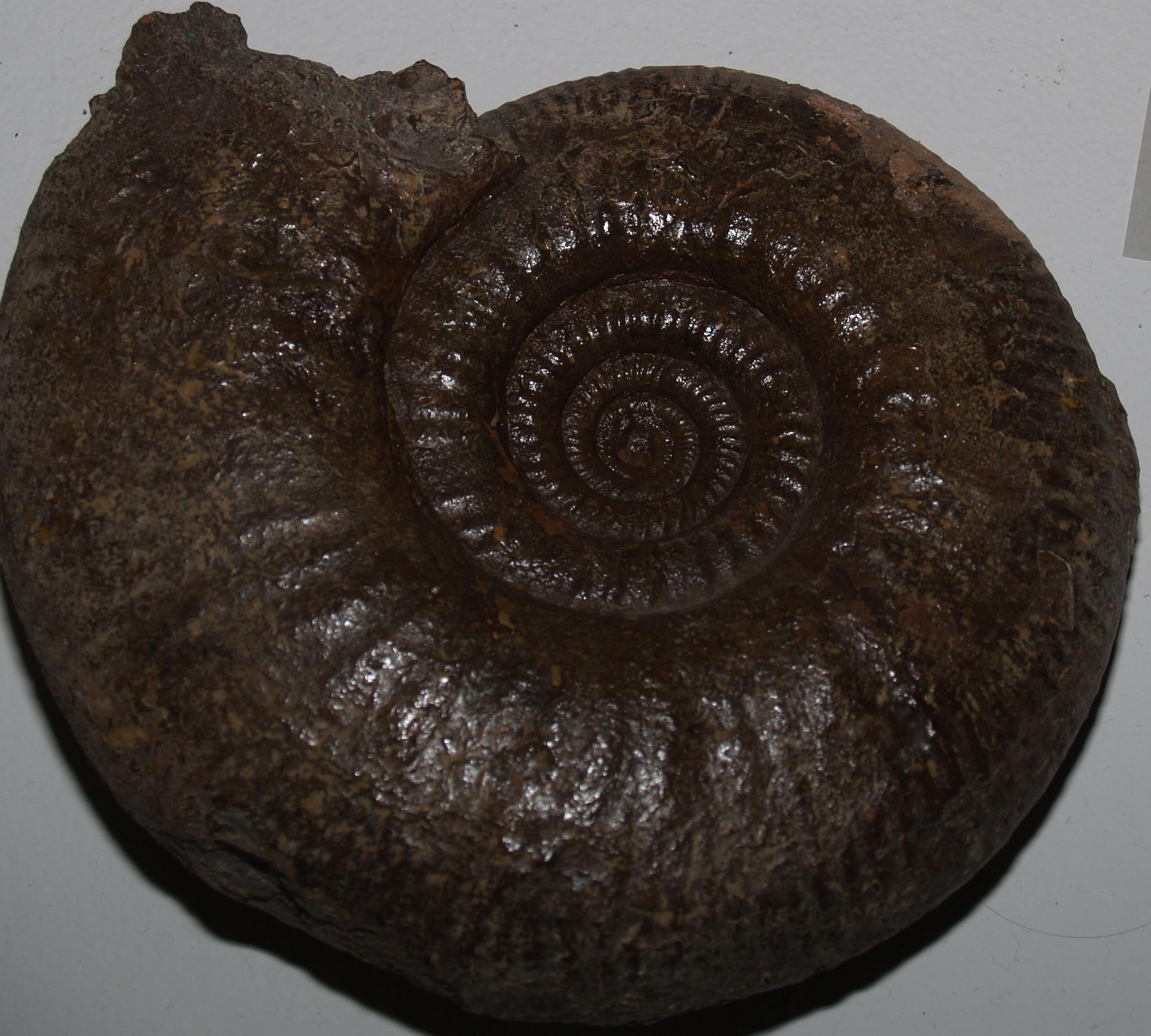

Scientific classification
- Kingdom: Animalia
- Phylum: Mollusca
- Class: Cephalopoda
- Subclass: †Ammonoidea
- Genus: †Procerites

= Procerites =

Procerites Temporal range: Bajocian–Bathonian

Procerites is an extinct genus from a well-known class of fossil cephalopods, the ammonites. It lived during the Jurassic Period.

== Distribution ==
Jurassic of China, France, Germany, Iran, Saudi Arabia and Switzerland.
