= Phaulostephanus =

Phaulostephanus Temporal range: Bajocian

Scientific classification
- Kingdom: Animalia
- Phylum: Mollusca
- Class: Cephalopoda
- Subclass: †Ammonoidea
- Order: †Ammonitida
- Family: †Stephanoceratidae
- Genus: †Phaulostephanus

Phaulostephanus is an extinct genus from the ammonoid family Stephanoceratidae, which is part of the ammonitid superfamily Stephanoceratoidea, that lived during the early Middle Jurassic.

Phaulostephanus is a small serptenticone with a generally subcircular to subquadrate whorl section, slightly sinuous ribbing, and tubercles that if present are weakly developed. Primary ribs are sharp, divide about mid flank into prominent and moderately sharp secondary ribs. The aperture of the macroconch has a broad ventral collar preceded by a constriction. That of the microconch is flanked by lappets and has no constriction. The suture is ammonitic.

Phaulostephanus was named by Buckman in 1927 and considered a subgenus of Stephanoceras by Arkell, et al.(1957) in the treatise. It was elevated to genus in Pavia (1983) and Westermann (1984) (ref't in Sandoval and Westermann 1986 )

== Distribution ==
Mexico and Hungary
