= Feistring Formation =

Geologic formation in Austria

- Stratigraphic range: Langhian
- Type: Formation

Lithology
- Primary: Sandstone
- Other: Gravel

Location
- Region: Styria
- Country: Austria

The Feistring Formation is a geologic formation in Austria. It preserves fossils dated to the Langhian age of the Miocene period.

== See also ==
- List of fossiliferous stratigraphic units in Austria
