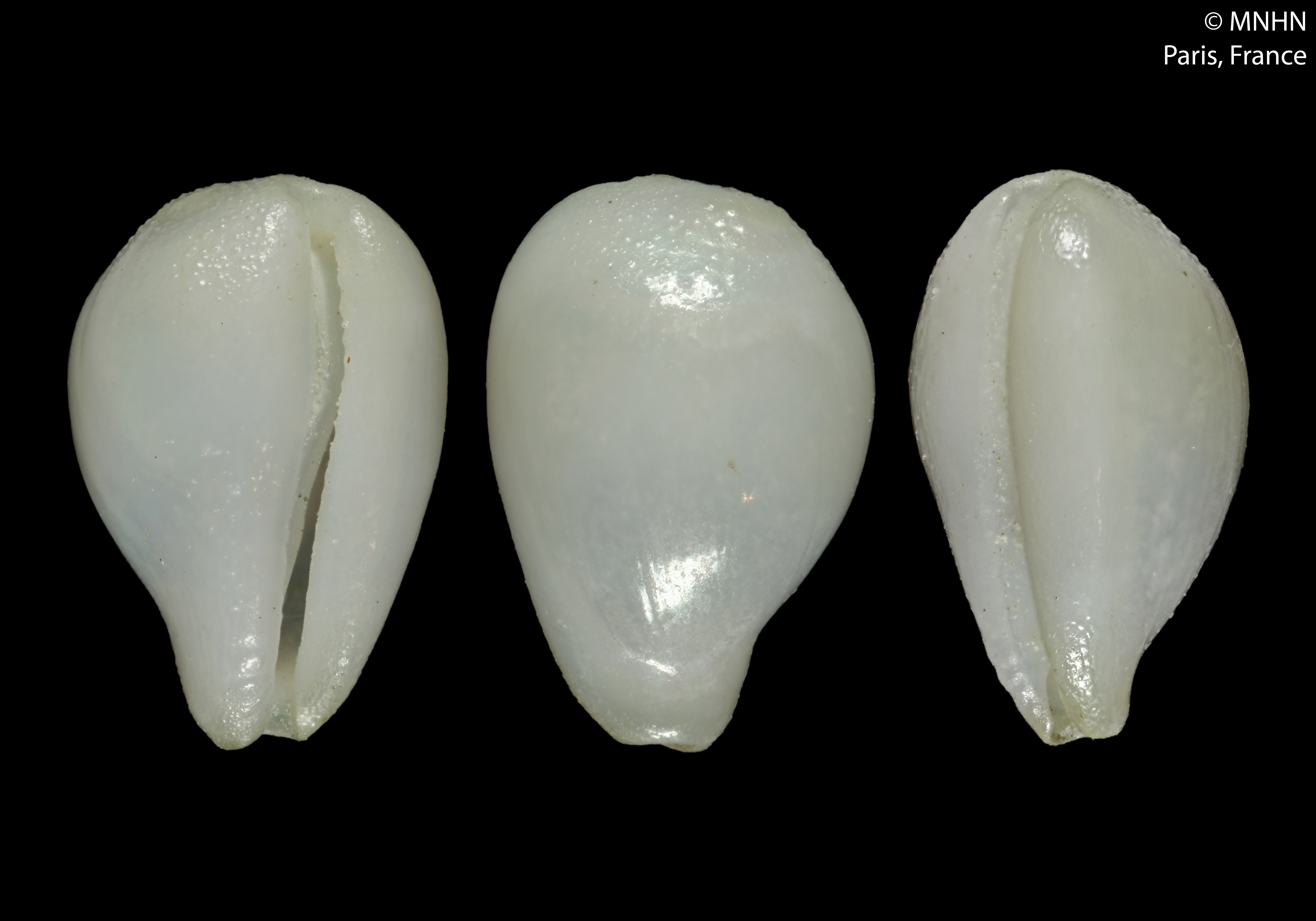
- Shell of Cypraeerato boucheti (holotype at MNHN, Paris)

Scientific classification
- Kingdom: Animalia
- Phylum: Mollusca
- Class: Gastropoda
- Subclass: Caenogastropoda
- Order: Littorinimorpha
- Superfamily: Cypraeoidea
- Family: Eratoidae
- Genus: Cypraeerato; Schilder, 1933

Type species
- Erato bimaculata Tate, 1878

Synonyms
- Proterato (Cypraeerato) Schilder, 1933 (original rank)

= Cypraeerato =

Genus of gastropods

Cypraeerato is a genus of small sea snails, marine gastropod molluscs in the family Eratoidae.

== Nomenclature ==
Under ICZN Art. 13.1, the name Cypraeerato is not available from Schilder (1932), who fixed a type species, but did not provide a description.

== Species ==
Species within the genus Cypraeerato include :

- Cypraeerato bimaculata (Tate, 1878)
- Cypraeerato boucheti (Drivas & Jay, 1986)
- Cypraeerato geralia (C. N. Cate, 1977)
- Cypraeerato margarita Fehse, 2018
- Cypraeerato nitida Fehse, 2018
- Cypraeerato rangiroa Fehse, 2012
- Cypraeerato splendida Fehse, 2017
- Cypraeerato stalagmia (C. N. Cate, 1975)

Species brought into synonymy

- Cypraeerato gemma (Bavay, 1917): synonym of Eratoena gemma (Bavay, 1917)
