= Nayband Formation =

Geologic formation in Iran

- Stratigraphic range: Norian–Rhaetian
- Type: Geological formation

Lithology
- Primary: Mainly siliciclastic; Shale, sandstone, Mudrock
- Other: siltstone, Coal

Location
- Region: Kerman Province,
- Country: Iran

The Upper Triassic Nayband Formation is located in eastern central Iran and preserves events such as the Eo-Cimmerian. The rocks of this formation are composed of detrital carbonate-silica sediments.
