= Alvania ziliolii =

Scientific classification
- Kingdom: Animalia
- Phylum: Mollusca
- Class: Gastropoda
- Subclass: Caenogastropoda
- Order: Littorinimorpha
- Superfamily: Rissooidea
- Family: Rissoidae
- Genus: Alvania
- Species: †A. ziliolii

Binomial name
- †Alvania ziliolii Brunetti & Vecchi, 2012

Species of gastropod

Alvania ziliolii is an extinct species of minute sea snail, a marine gastropod mollusc or micromollusk in the family Rissoidae.

== Distribution ==
Fossils of this marine species were found in Pleistocene strata in Emilia, Italy.
