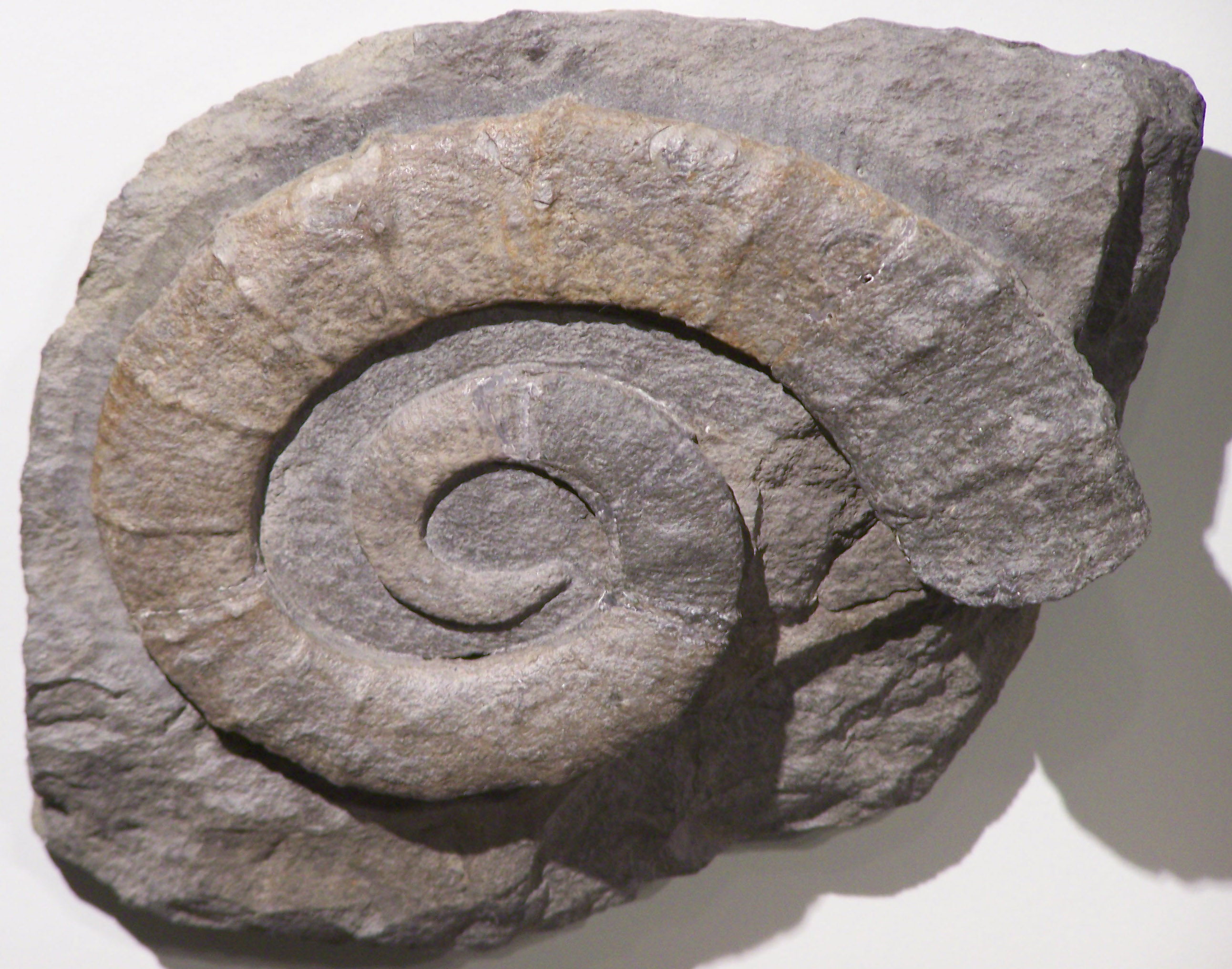
- Crioceratites species

Scientific classification
- Domain: Eukaryota
- Kingdom: Animalia
- Phylum: Mollusca
- Class: Cephalopoda
- Subclass: †Ammonoidea
- Order: †Ammonitida
- Suborder: †Ancyloceratina
- Family: †Crioceratitidae
- Genus: †Crioceratites; Léveillé, 1837

Synonyms
- Crioceras d'Orbigny, 1842; Crioceratites (Crioceras) d'Orbigny, 1842; Toxoceras d'Orbigny, 1842

= Crioceratites =

Crioceratites Temporal range: Valanginian–Barremian

Genus of molluscs (fossil)

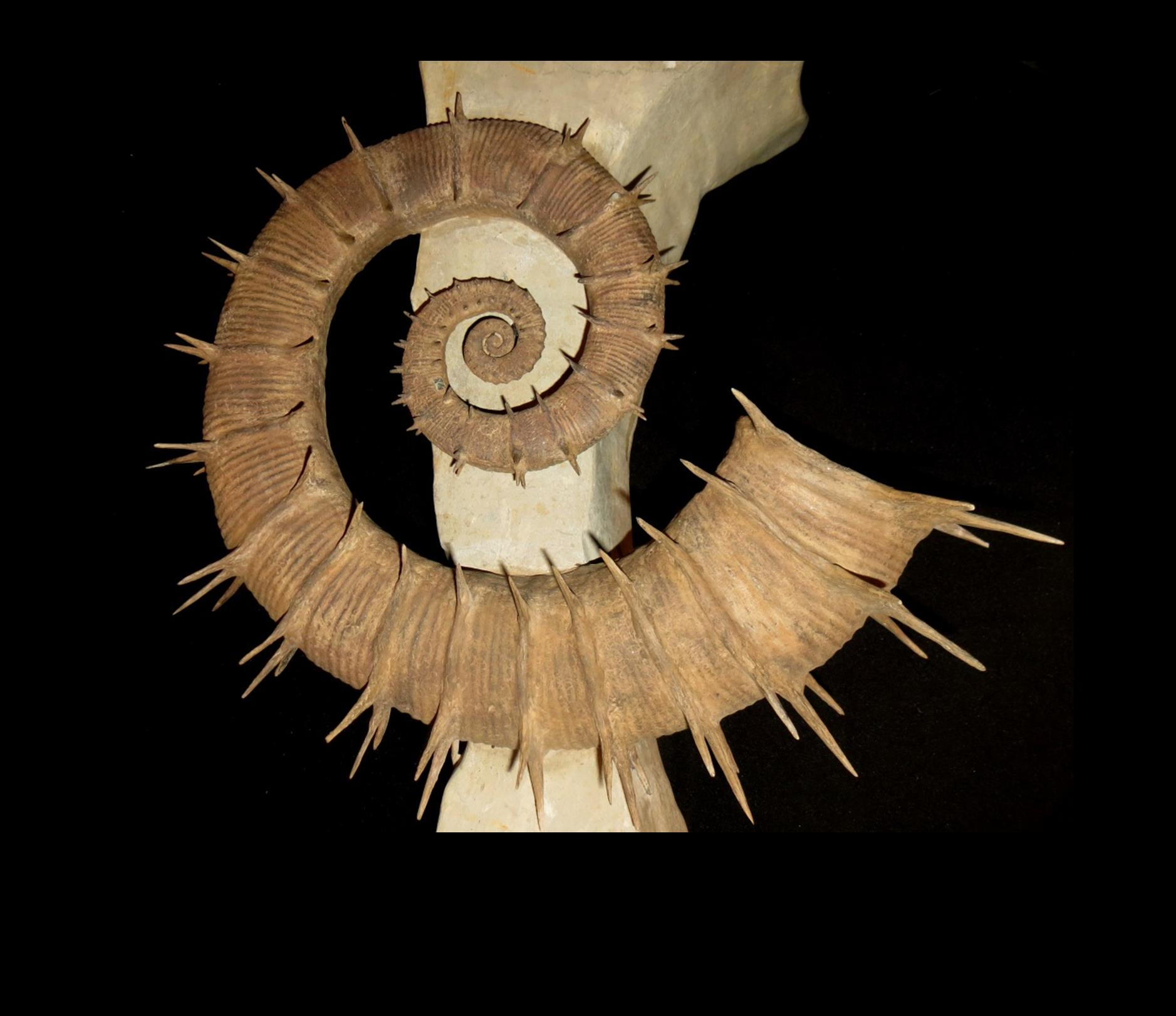
A rare heteromorph ammonite fossil from the south of France. The species is Crioceratites nolani and the spines have been partially restored to show how it might have appeared in life

Crioceratites is an ammonite genus from the Early Cretaceous belonging to the Ancyloceratoidea.

Crioceratites was formerly included in the Ancyloceratidae, in the subfamily Crioceratinae which was subsequently elevated in rank to the family Crioceratidae. Crioceras and Toxoceras d'Orbigny and possibly Emericiceras Sarka 1954 are junior synonyms.

== Species ==
Species within the genus Crioceratites include:

- C. anglesensis Sarkar, 1955
- C. anglesensis non Sarkar Thomel, 1965
- C. angulatus Torcapel, 1884 - nomen dubium
- C. arci Dimitrova, 1967
- C. arkelli Sarkar, 1955
- C. baylei Sarkar, 1955
- C. barrabei Sarkar, 1955
- C. bispinatus Reynés, 1876 - nomen dubium
- C. bituberculatus D'Orbigny, 1842 - nomen dubium
- C. coniferus Busnardo in Busnardo et al., 2003
- C. curnieri Ropolo, 1992
- ?C. delessei Reynés, 1876
- C. duvalii Léveillé, 1837
- C. gagarini Dimitrova, 1967
- C. heterocostatus Mandov, 1976
- C. hildiensiformis Roch, 1930
- C. inermis Sarkar, 1955
- C. irregularis Dimitrova, 1967
- C. karakaschi Sarkar, 1955
- C. koechliniformis Sarkar, 1955
- C. krenkeli Sarkar, 1955
- C. lorioli Matheron, 1880
- C. loryi Sarkar, 1955
- C. mandovi Avram, 1995
- C. matsumotoi Sarkar, 1955
- ?C. monotuberculatus Avram, 2002 - nomen nudum
- C. monsalvensis Etayo-Serna, 1968
- ?C. mundum Renngarten, 1951 - nomen nudum
- C. panescorii Astier, 1851 - nomen dubium
- C. piveteaui Sarkar, 1955
- ?C. portarum Etayo-Serna, 1968
- C. primitivus Reboulet, 1996
- C. ramkrishnai Sarkar, 1955
- C. rodighieri Dimitrova, 1967
- C. sahnii Sarkar, 1955
- C. schindewolfi Sarkar, 1955
- C. shibaae Sarkar, 1955
- C. shibaniae Sarkar, 1955
- C. sinzowi Karakasch, 1907
- C. sornayi Sarkar, 1955
- C. stahleckeri Sarkar, 1955
- C. tehamaensis Anderson, 1938
- ?C. tenuilobatus von Koenen, 1902
- C. vialii Sarkar, 1955
- C. villiersianus D'Orbigny, 1842
- C. vishnui Sarkar, 1955

== Description ==
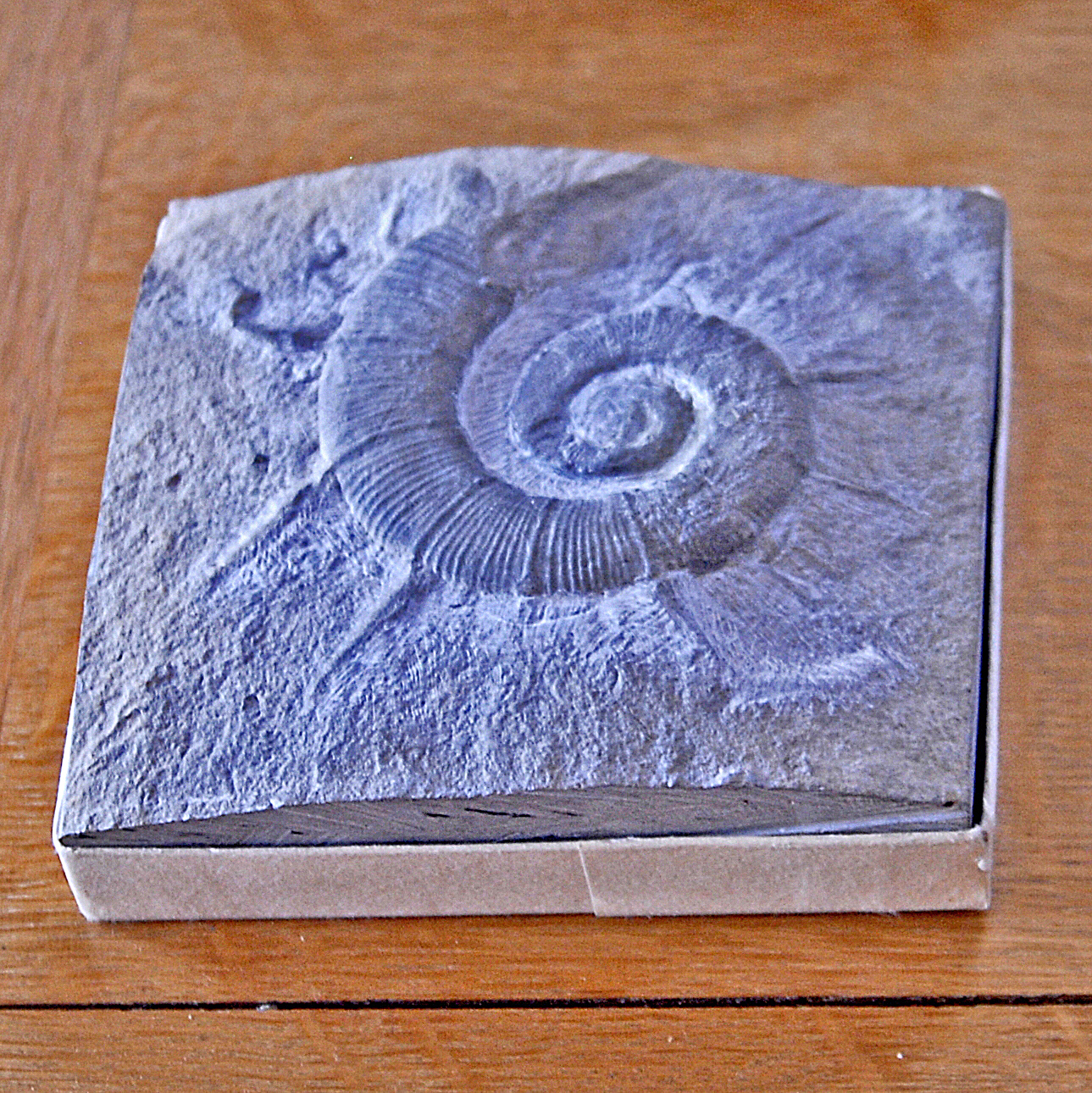
Crioceratites duvalii, on display at Galerie de paléontologie et d'anatomie comparée in Paris

Crioceratites is coiled in an open, normally equiangular spiral with an oval or subquadrate whorl section. The surface is banded by fine, dense, rounded ribbing sectioned by periodically spaced thick and often spinose ribs.

== Distribution ==
Crioceratites fossils have been found in Lower Cretaceous Valanginian-Barremanian, sediments in Europe, Africa, Asia, North America and South America; Argentina, Chile and Colombia (Paja Formation).
