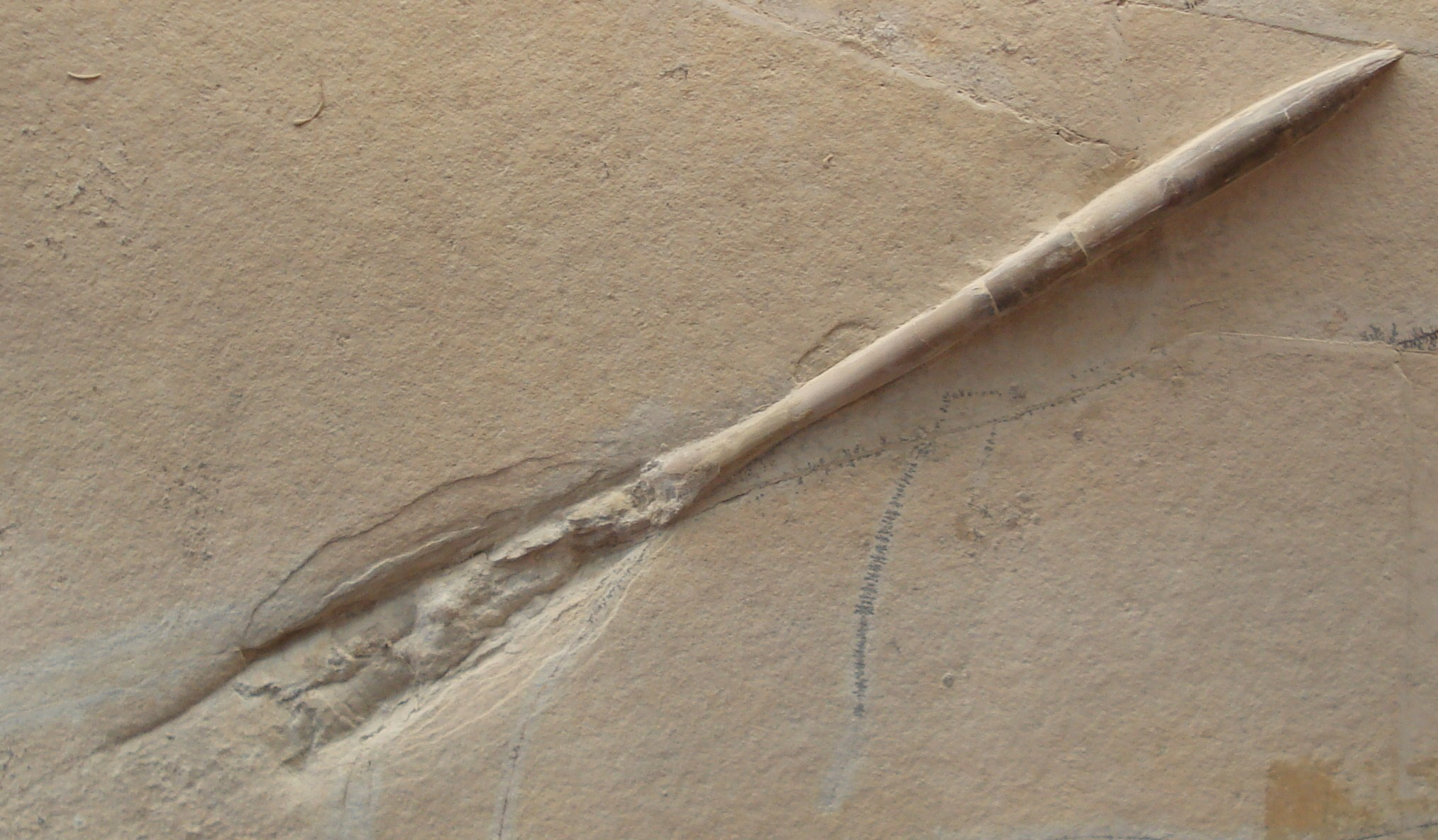
- Hibolites hastatus

Scientific classification
- Kingdom: Animalia
- Phylum: Mollusca
- Class: Cephalopoda
- Order: †Belemnitida
- Family: †Belemnopseidae
- Genus: †Hibolites; Berthold, 1827

= Hibolites =

Extinct genus of molluscs

Hibolites is a genus of belemnites, an extinct group of cephalopods.
