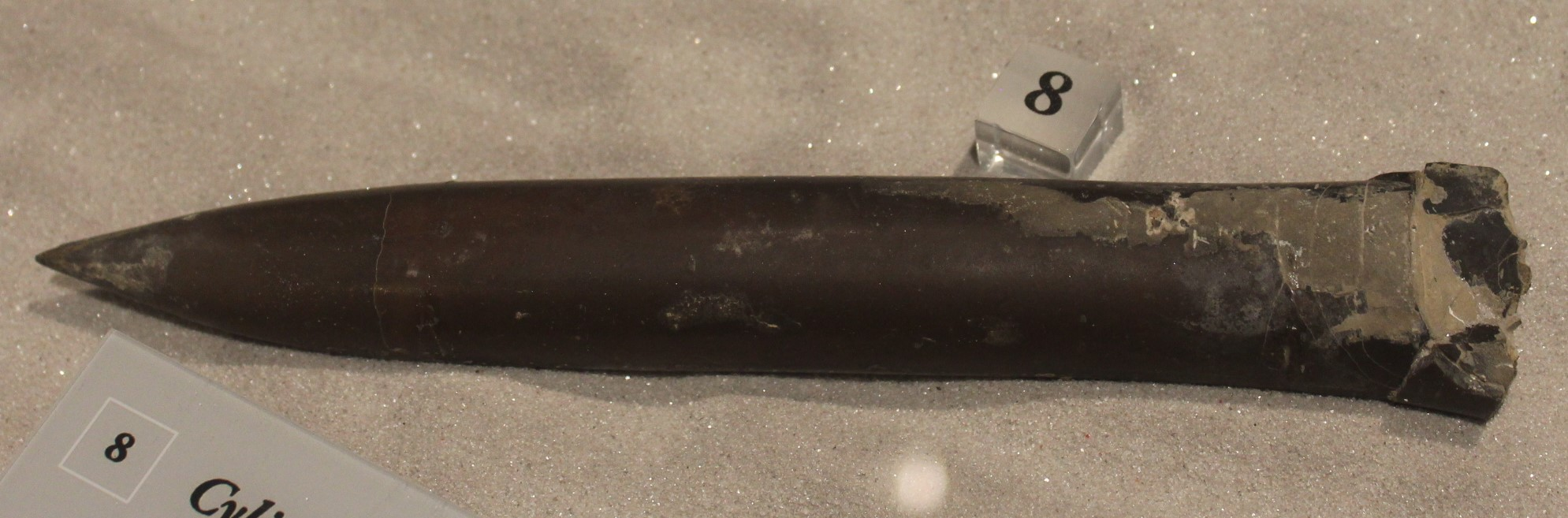
- Guard of C. puzosi, University of Michigan Museum of Natural History

Scientific classification
- Kingdom: Animalia
- Phylum: Mollusca
- Class: Cephalopoda
- Order: †Belemnitida
- Genus: †Cylindroteuthis; Bayle, 1879

Species
- See Species List

Synonyms
- Cylindroteuthis puzosiana - synonym of C. puzosi

= Cylindroteuthis =

Cylindroteuthis Temporal range: Early Jurassic–Early Cretaceous

Genus of molluscs

Cylindroteuthis is a genus of belemnite that lived from the Early Jurassic to the Early Cretaceous. Its fossils have been found in Asia, Europe, North America, and New Zealand.

== Taxonomical history ==
Cylindroteuthis was first described in 1879 by Claude-Emile Bayle. A belemnite originally described as the Cylindroteuthis species C. confessa has been re-described as Mesoteuthis soloniensis.

== Paleobiology ==
Cylindroteuthis is a common find from several Jurassic formations. Specimen length ranges from 10 to 22 centimetres (4 to 8 1/2 inches). The most commonly preserved part of the animal is its guard, or rostrum, which was composed of calcite. The guard would not have been found on the exterior of Cylindroteuthis, as traces of blood vessels have been discovered on some guards, suggesting that it was an internal feature. The guard housed a phragmocone, which allowed Cylindroteuthis to maintain buoyancy in water. Some better-preserved specimens have features similar to modern squid, such as ten arm-like appendages and an ink sac, intact.

== Distribution ==
Cylindroteuthis has been recovered from the Temaikan Boatlanding Bay formation of Australasia. Three species of Cylindroteuthis (C. knoxvillensis, C. cf. newvillensis, and C. venusta) have been described from the Arctic region. In addition, about 2350 belemnite guards (including those of Cylindroteuthis) have been recovered from Lower Cretaceous formations of northeastern Greenland, suggesting the presence of a sort of "immigration route" for belemnites. The findings also suggest the existence of a "proto Gulf-stream" as early as the Valanginian. Another species, C. cf. obeliscoides is associated with the early Cretaceous One Tree Formation of Vancouver Island.

== Species ==
The genus contains thirteen species

- Cylindroteuthis clavicula
- Cylindroteuthis cuspidata
- Cylindroteuthis gelida
- Cylindroteuthis glennensis
- Cylindroteuthis jacutica
- Cylindroteuthis knoxvillensis
- Cylindroteuthis newvillensis
- Cylindroteuthis occidentalis
- Cylindroteuthis oweni
- Cylindroteuthis porrecta
- Cylindroteuthis porrectiformis
- Cylindroteuthis puzosi
- Cylindroteuthis venusta
