= Damaisiceras =

Damaisiceras Temporal range: Hauterivian

Scientific classification
- Domain: Eukaryota
- Kingdom: Animalia
- Phylum: Mollusca
- Class: Cephalopoda
- Subclass: †Ammonoidea
- Order: †Ammonitida
- Suborder: †Ancyloceratina
- Family: †Crioceratitidae
- Genus: †Damaisiceras; Vermeulen & al., 2012

Type species
- Damaisiceras baquei Vermeulen & al., 2012

Extinct genus of ammonites

Damaisiceras is an extinct monospecific ancylocerid genus included in the family Crioceratitidae, subclass Ammonoidea, from the Upper Hauterivian, zone of Balearites balearis. Fossils belonging to this genera were found southeastern France.
