= Curacoites =

Curacoites Temporal range: Barremian

Scientific classification
- Kingdom: Animalia
- Phylum: Mollusca
- Class: Cephalopoda
- Subclass: Ammonoidea
- Genus: Curacoites Aguirre-Urreta & Rawson, 2012

Extinct genus of ammonites

Curacoites is a genus of ammonites which existed during the early Barremian of what is now Argentina. It was described by Beatriz Aguirre-Urreta and Peter F. Rawson in 2012, and the type species is C. rotundus.
