= Melagathiceratidae =

Melagathiceratidae Temporal range: Late Triassic

Scientific classification
- Kingdom: Animalia
- Phylum: Mollusca
- Class: Cephalopoda
- Subclass: †Ammonoidea
- Order: †Ceratitida
- Superfamily: †Meekoceratoidea
- Family: †Melagathiceratidae; Tozer 1971

Genera
- Juvenites; Melagathiceras; Proharpoceras; Thermalites

Melagathiceratidae is an extinct family of Lower Triassic ammonoid cephalopods belonging to the order Ceratitida established by E. T. Tozer in 1971.

The type genus of the family is Melagathiceras. The type species, Melagathiceras globosus was first named in by Popov in 1939, from Siberia as Parannites globosus. Melegathiceras crassum Tozer, from the Canadian Arctic, is an alternative of Juvenites crassus.
