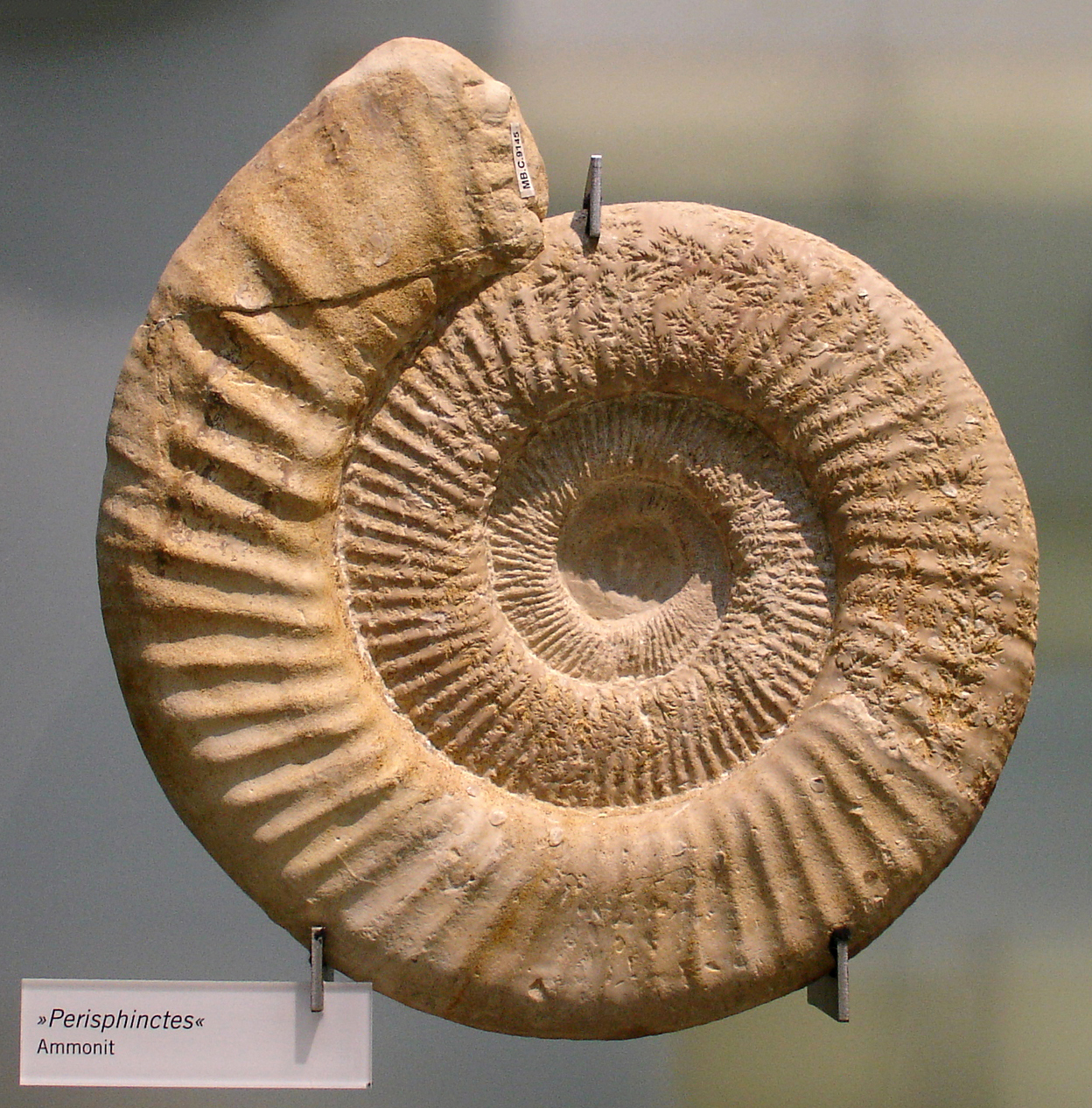
- Exhibit from the Museum of Natural History in Berlin

Scientific classification
- Kingdom: Animalia
- Phylum: Mollusca
- Class: Cephalopoda
- Subclass: †Ammonoidea
- Order: †Ammonitida
- Family: †Perisphinctidae
- Subfamily: †Perisphinctinae
- Genus: †Perisphinctes; Waagen, 1869

Type species
- Ammonites variocostatus Buckland, 1836

Species
- P. abadiensis; P. arussiorum; P. birmensdorfensis; P. choffati; P. gallarum; P. hillebrandti; P. jubailensis; P. parandieri; P. picteti; P. roubyanus; P. stenocyclus; P. variocostatus

= Perisphinctes =

Perisphinctes Temporal range: Callovian–Tithonian

Extinct genus of ammonite

Perisphinctes is an extinct genus of ammonite cephalopod. They lived during the Middle to Late Jurassic epochs and serve as an index fossil for that time period. The species P. boweni was named after the English chemist and geologist E. J. Bowen (1898–1980).

== Etymology ==
The genus name Perisphinctes is derived from the greek prefix peri- (περί), meaning "around," and sphinctes (from σφίγγω, sphingō, "to bind tightly"), referring to the tightly coiled ammonite shell.

== Distribution ==
Cephalopods of species belonging to this genus have been found in the Jurassic of Antarctica, Argentina, Chile, Cuba, Egypt, Ethiopia, France, Germany, Hungary, India, Iran, Italy, Japan, Madagascar, Poland, Portugal, Russia, Saudi Arabia, Spain, Switzerland, the United Kingdom and Yemen.

== Gallery ==
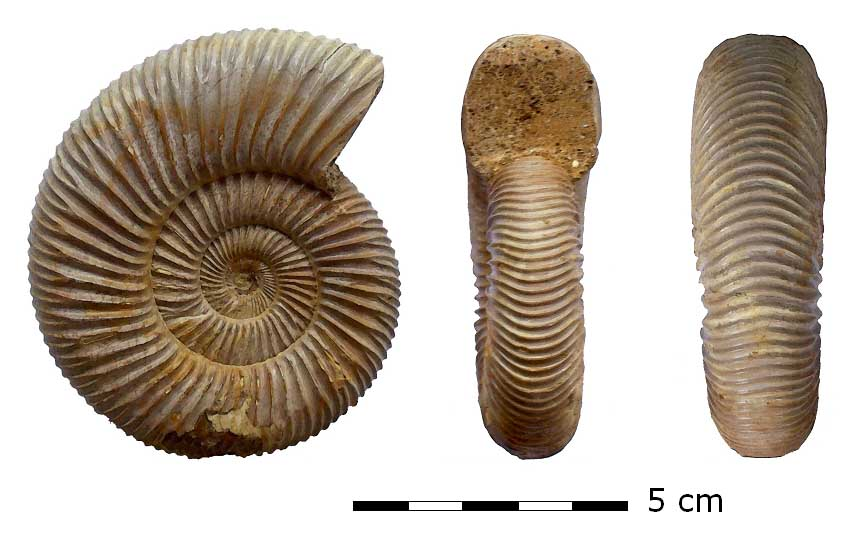
Perisphinctes virguloides

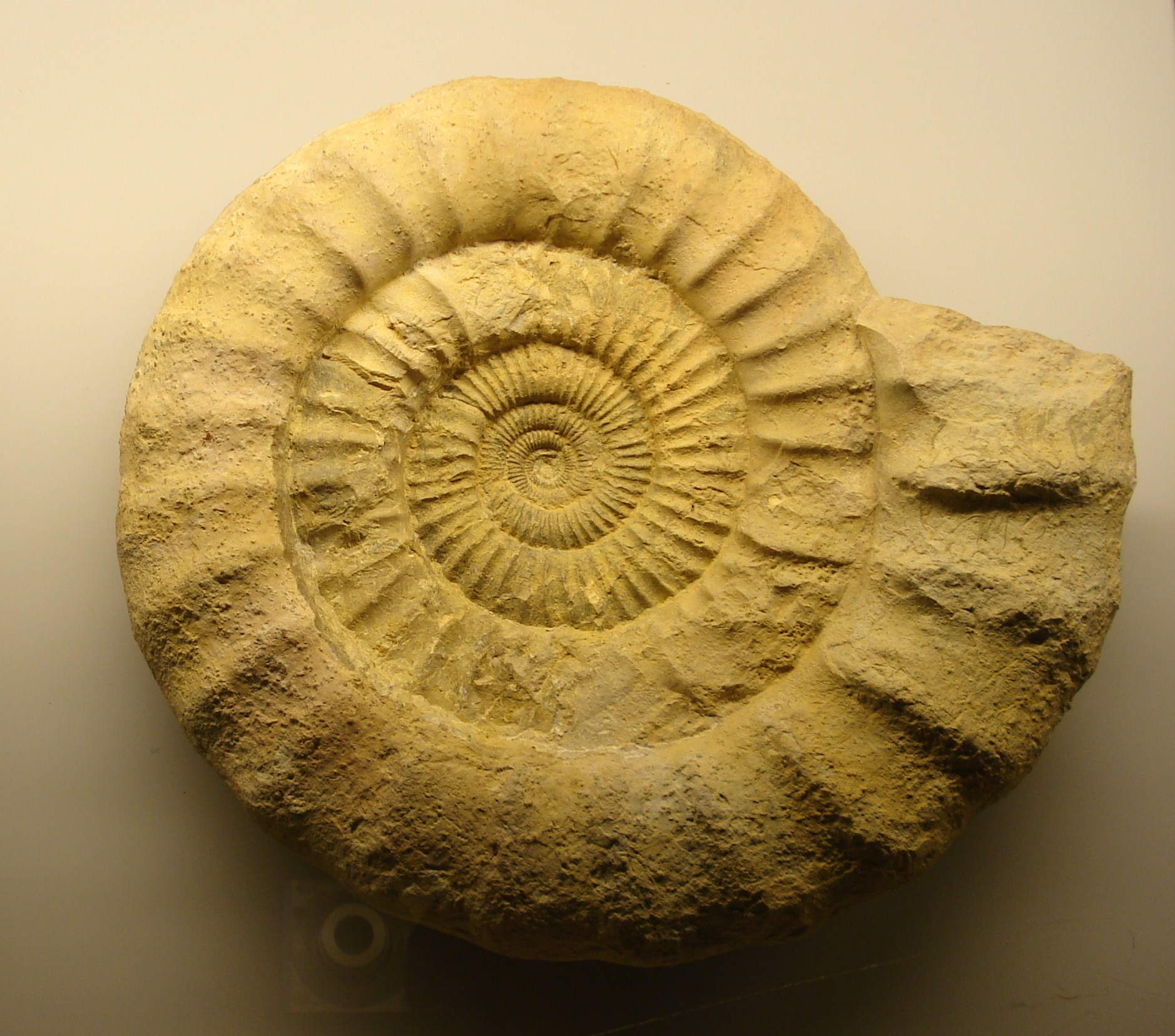
Perisphinctes choffati

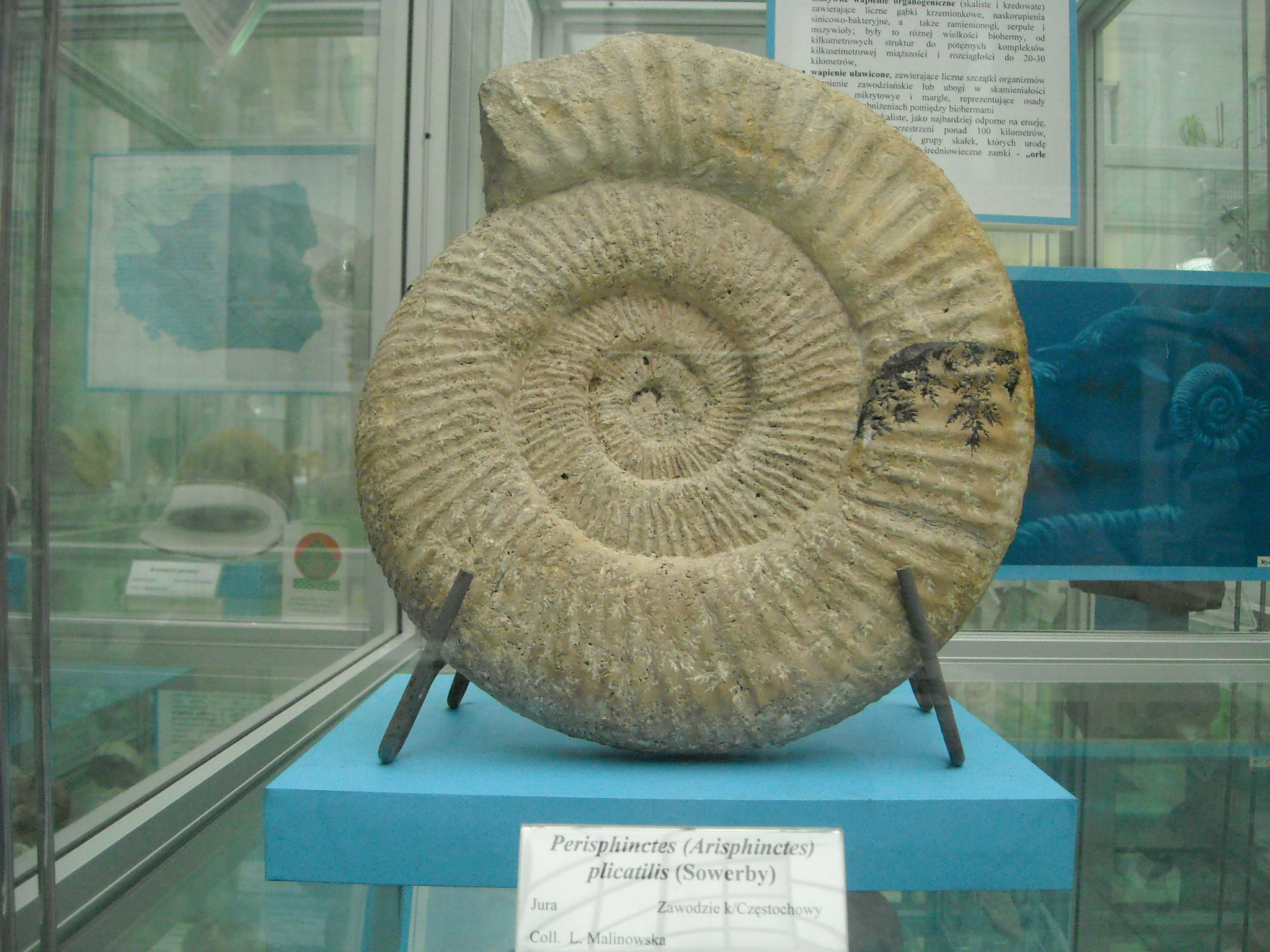
Perisphinctes plicatilis

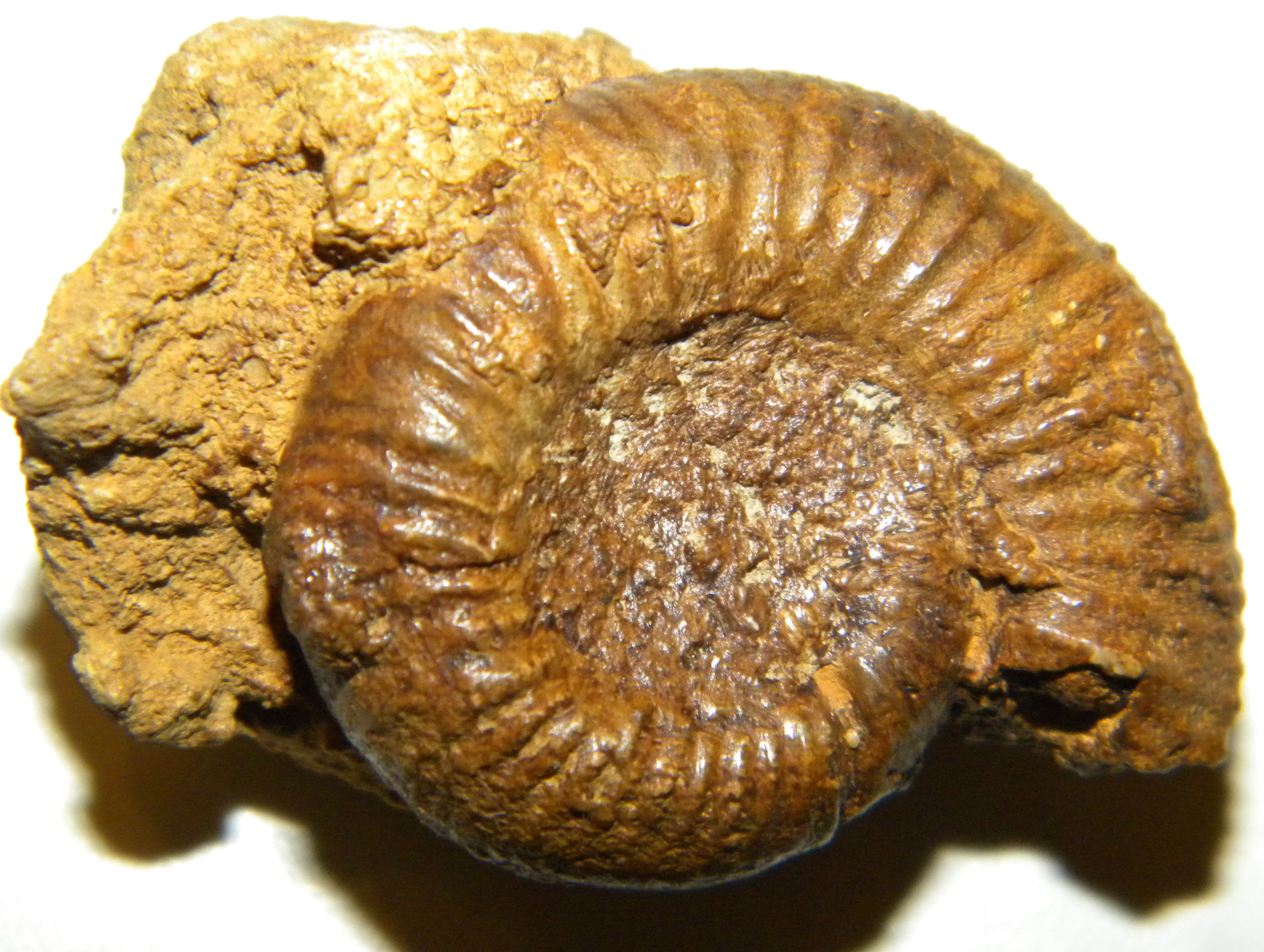
Perisphingtes oxfordien
