= List of belemnite genera =

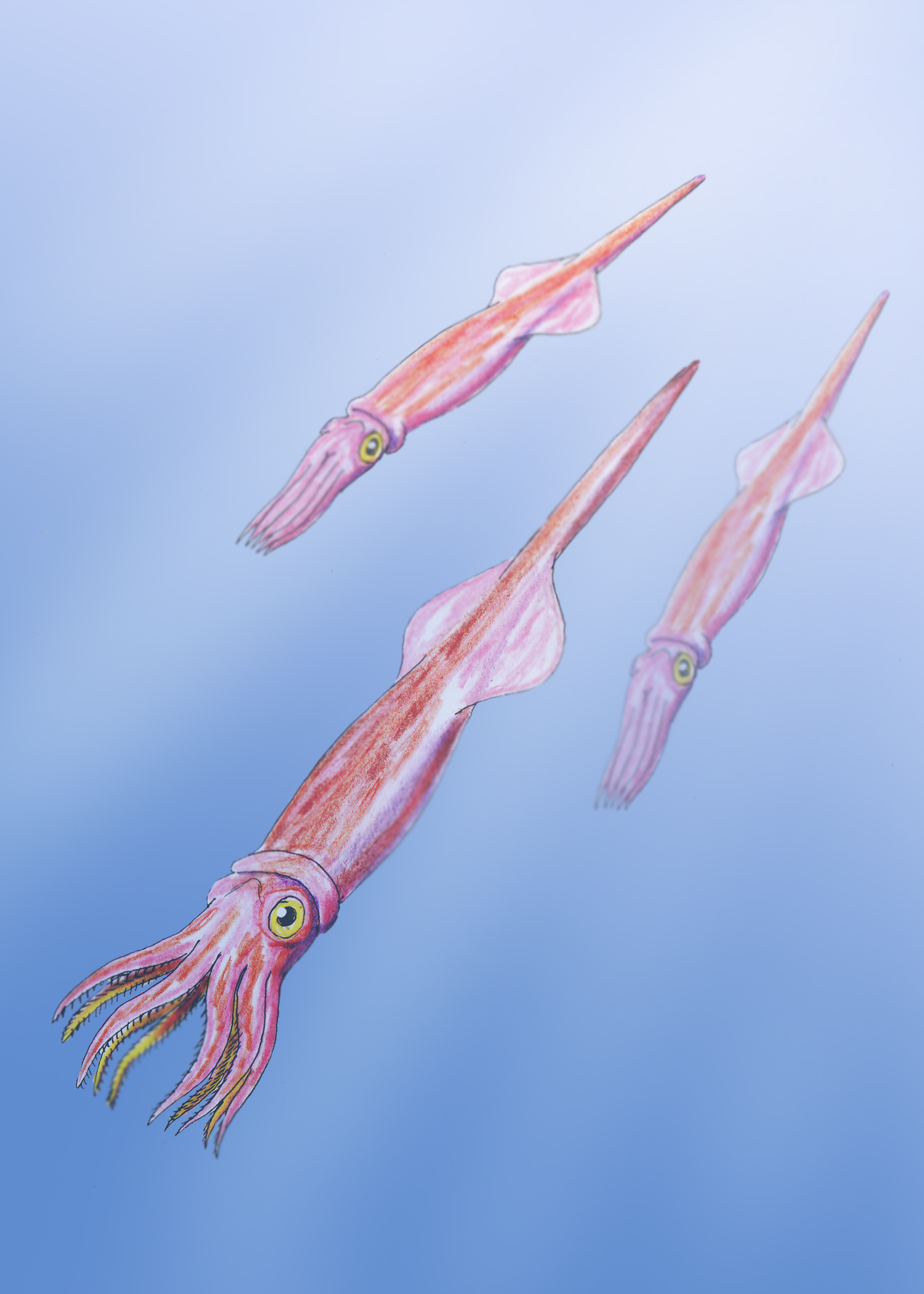
Belemnites

This list of belemnite genera is an attempt to create a comprehensive listing of all genera that have ever been included in the extinct subclass Belemnoidea, excluding purely vernacular terms. The list includes all commonly accepted genera, as well as genera that are now considered invalid, doubtful (nomina dubia), or were not formally published (nomina nuda), as well as junior synonyms of more established names, and genera that are no longer considered belemnites. Naming conventions and terminology follow the International Code of Zoological Nomenclature as indicated.

The list currently contains 100 generic names.

== List of belemnites ==
- †Acanthoteuthis
- †Acrocoelites
- †Acroteuthis, Berry (1913). Asia, Europe, N. America.
- †Actinocamax
- †Arcobelus, Saks (1967)
- †Atractites
- †Aulacoceras
- †Aulacoteuthis, Stolley (1911).
- †Aussites
- †Austroteuthis, Jeletzky, Zapfe (1967).
- †Bactritimimus, Flower, Gordon (1959).
- †Bayanoteuthis, Munier-Chalmas (1871).
- †Belemnella
- †Belemnellocamax
- †Belemnitella, Europe, N. America.
- †Belemnites
- †Belemnitina
- †Belemnocamax, Crick (1910).
- †Belemnopsis, Bayle (1878).
- †Belemnotheutis
- †Belospirula
- †Brachybelus
- †Breviatractites, Mariotti, Pignatti (1992).
- †Brevibelus, Doyle (1992).
- †Buelowiteuthis, Jeletzky (1965).
- †Calliconites
- †Chalalabelus
- †Chitinoteuthis
- †Chondroteuthis
- †Coeloteuthis
- †Conobelus
- †Conodicoelites
- †Conoteuthis
- †Crassiatractites
- †Curtohibolites
- †Cylindroteuthis, Asia, Europe, New Zealand, North America.
- †Dactyloteuthis
- †Dicoelites
- †Dictyoconites
- †Dimitobelus
- †Diplobelus
- †Duvalia
- †Eobelemnites
- †Fusiteuthis
- †Gastrobelus
- †Gonioteuthis
- †Hastites
- †Hematites
- †Hibolites
- †Hibolithes
- †Holcobelus
- †Homaloteuthis
- †Lagonibelus
- †Lenobelus
- †Megateuthis
- †Mesohibolites
- †Mesoteuthis
- †Metabelemnites
- †Mojsisovicsteuthis
- †Nannobelus
- †Neobelemnella
- †Neohibolites
- †Oxyteuthis
- †Pachyduvalia
- †Pachyteuthis, Asia, Europe.
- †Palaeobelemnopsis
- †Paleoconus
- †Parahastites
- †Parahibolites
- †Paramegateuthis
- †Parapassaloteuthis
- †Passaloteuthis
- †Patagonibelus
- †Pavloviteuthis
- †Peratobelus
- †Permoteuthis
- †Phragmoteuthis
- †Pleurobelus
- †Praeoxyteuthis
- †Produvalia
- †Prographularia
- †Protoaulacoceras
- †Pseudobelus
- †Pseudodicoelites
- †Pseudohastites
- †Quiricobelus
- †Raphibelus
- †Rhabdobelus
- †Rhiphaeoteuthis
- †Rhopaloteuthis
- †Sachsibelus
- †Salpingoteuthis
- †Schwegleria
- †Sichuanobelus
- †Simpsonibelus
- †Sinobelemnites
- †Somalibelus
- †Tauriconites
- †Tetrabelus
- †Vectibelus
- †Volgobelus
- †Youngibelus
- †Zugmontites

== See also ==
- Belemnoidea
- List of ammonites
- List of nautiloids
