= Schwegler =

Schwegler is a Swiss surname. Notable people with the surname include:

- Albert Schwegler (1819–1857), German philosopher, theologian, and historian
- Christian Schwegler (born 1984), Swiss footballer
- Emil Schwegler (1879–1968), Swiss-born American gymnast, sports shooter and bowler
- Fritz Schwegler (1935–2014), German artist
- Heidi Schwegler (born 1967), American artist
- Karl Schwegler (1902–?), Swiss rower
- Paul Schwegler (1907–1980), American gridiron football player and actor
- Pirmin Schwegler (born 1987), Swiss footballer
- Roland Schwegler (born 1982), Swiss footballer

== See also ==
- Schwegleria, a genus of belemnite
- Schweglerstraße station, a station of the Vienna U-Bahn
