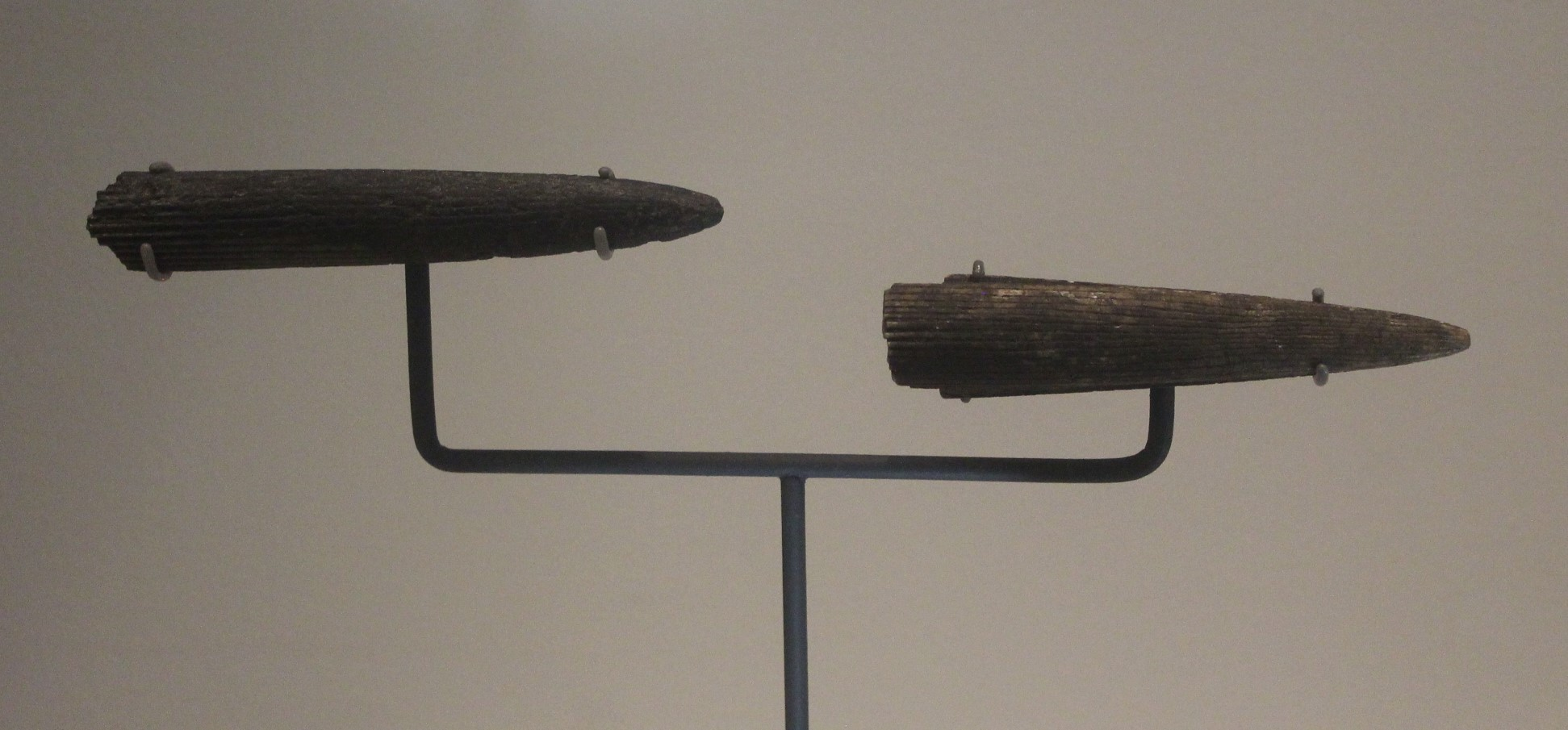
- A. sulcatum guards, National Museum of Natural History

Scientific classification
- Domain: Eukaryota
- Kingdom: Animalia
- Phylum: Mollusca
- Class: Cephalopoda
- Superorder: †Belemnoidea
- Genus: †Aulacoceras

= Aulacoceras =

Aulacoceras Temporal range: 235.0–201.6 Ma

Extinct genus of molluscs

Aulacoceras is a genus of belemnite, an extinct group of cephalopods.

== See also ==
- Belemnite
- List of belemnites
