= Bactritimimus =

Bactritimimus Temporal range: 326.4–318.1 Ma

Scientific classification
- Domain: Eukaryota
- Kingdom: Animalia
- Phylum: Mollusca
- Class: Cephalopoda
- Superorder: †Belemnoidea
- Genus: †Bactritimimus; Flower and Gordon 1959

Extinct genus of molluscs

Bactritimimus is a genus of belemnite from the Mississippian Epoch.

== Species ==
- Bactritimimus girtyi Flower and Gordon 1959
- Bactritimimus ulrichi Flower and Gordon 1959

== See also ==
- Belemnite
- List of belemnites
