= Belemnocamax =

Belemnocamax Temporal range: 99.7–94.3 Ma

Scientific classification
- Domain: Eukaryota
- Kingdom: Animalia
- Phylum: Mollusca
- Class: Cephalopoda
- Superorder: †Belemnoidea
- Genus: †Belemnocamax

Extinct genus of molluscs

Belemnocamax is a genus of belemnite, an extinct group of cephalopods.

== See also ==
- Belemnite
- List of belemnites
