= Paleoconus =

Paleoconus Temporal range: Lower Serpukhovian

Scientific classification
- Kingdom: Animalia
- Phylum: Mollusca
- Class: Cephalopoda
- Superorder: †Belemnoidea
- Genus: †Paleoconus

Genus of belemnites

Paleoconus is a genus of belemnite from the Mississippian Epoch.

== See also ==
- Belemnoidea
- Belemnite
- List of belemnites
