= Neobelemnella =

Scientific classification
- Kingdom: Animalia
- Phylum: Mollusca
- Class: Cephalopoda
- Superorder: †Belemnoidea
- Genus: †Neobelemnella

Extinct genus of molluscs

Neobelemnella is a genus of belemnite, an extinct group of cephalopods.

== See also ==
- Belemnite
- List of belemnites
