= Austroteuthis =

Austroteuthis Temporal range: Rhaetian

Scientific classification
- Domain: Eukaryota
- Kingdom: Animalia
- Phylum: Mollusca
- Class: Cephalopoda
- Superorder: †Belemnoidea
- Genus: †Austroteuthis

Extinct genus of molluscs

Austroteuthis is a genus of belemnite, an extinct group of cephalopods.

== See also ==
- List of belemnites
