= Veracruz Church =

Iglesia de la Veracruz
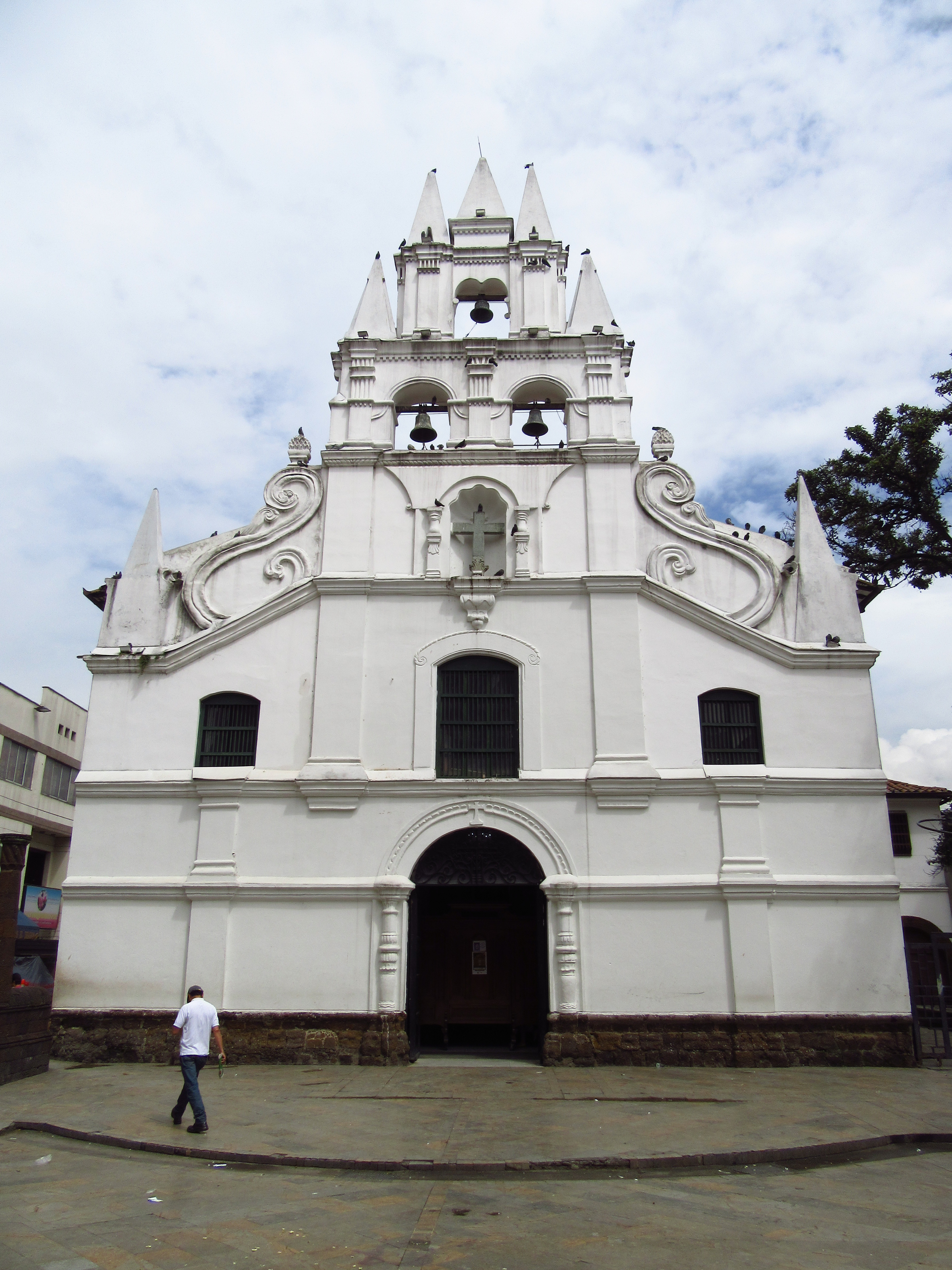
- Facade
- Iglesia de la Veracruz
- 6.25126°N 75.56961°W
- Location: Medellín
- Denomination: Catholic

History
- Status: Active
- Founder: Captain Juan Céspedes de Hinestroza
- Consecrated: 1809

Architecture
- Architect(s): José Ortiz, Joaquín Gómez and José Peinado
- Style: Baroque
- Groundbreaking: AD 1682
- Completed: AD 1713 (demolished in 1791, rebuilt in 1803)

Veracruz Church (Spanish: Iglesia de la Veracruz) is a Roman Catholic church under the invocation of the "Vera Cruz" or Holy Cross. It is located in the center of the city of Medellín, Colombia, on the western side of the Plazuela de la Veracruz. It is the only colonial church in the city.

== History ==
In 1682, Captain Juan Céspedes de Hinestroza began the construction (at the site of the current church of La Veracruz) of a chapel or hermitage on land purchased from Mr. Luis Acevedo Rides. However, when the walls had advanced to a height of a few meters, the work was suspended.

In 1712, Captain Céspedes formed a committee among Europeans and foreigners to establish the Brotherhood of N. S. de los Milagros, and in the first session, it was resolved to request authorization from the Bishop of Popayán to finalize the hermitage, to whose jurisdiction the entire province of Antioquia belonged.

The Governor of Antioquia, Francisco Baraya y Campa, also granted permission. At that time, permits from both civil and ecclesiastical authorities were necessary to build churches, chapels, or hermitages for public worship.

Due to the great dedication of the president of the committee, Captain Céspedes, who fought to give it a quick completion, and with the help of some wealthy and wealthy foreigners residing in Medellín, the hermitage was completed in January 1713.

The church came to be called the hermitage of La Veracruz de los Forasteros, which served as a cemetery for foreigners, in addition to hosting masses and also serving to deposit the Holy Sepulcher during Holy Week and for the processions of the greater litanies, following the example of the hermitages in the city of Antioquia.

In March 1791, it was threatened with ruin, so it was completely demolished, and reconstruction began on December 26 of that same year. The Spanish resident Don José Peinado Ruiz invested large sums of money in the reconstruction of this significant work, which was inaugurated on November 30, 1803. Chronicles recount that this gentleman, for the day of the inauguration, decorated the entire church with carnations, roses, and lilies brought from Rionegro, and to the surprise of the crowd, he watered the entire church floor with cologne water. Its master builders were José Ortiz, Joaquín Gómez, and José Peinado himself. The blessing of the current Church of La Veracruz, of a popular Baroque style, took place on March 26, 1809, by the priest Alberto María de la Calle, who blessed and dedicated the work to priestly and religious service.

Since then, La Veracruz has been a support point for the worship of the Church of La Candelaria, mainly in 1826 and 1850 when it was closed for renovations, and for this reason, the funeral of Monsignor Juan de la Cruz Gómez Plata, Bishop of Antioquia, who died in this city on December 1, 1850, was held at La Veracruz. In 1868, it had to serve as the Parish of the cathedral, due to the new designation of La Candelaria, upon the creation of the Diocese.

In 1883, La Veracruz was the second parish in the urban area of Medellín. It is said that one of its bells was used by the Sage Francisco José de Caldas to make a cannon destined for Independence.

In 1968, the plaza was remodeled, and the columns of hematites were placed, along with the first bronze fountain that Medellín had. The monument to Atanasio Girardot, a work by Francisco Antonio Cano, was also remodeled. In 1976, Father Celedonio Arismendi decorated all the altars with fine gold and retouched the images in the same metal. Father Gabriel Escobar had already built the rectory, adjacent to the church and facing the plaza.

It was declared a cultural heritage of the nation on March 12, 1982. Today its façade can be seen in white color, and it was restored by the Ferrocarril de Antioquia Foundation.

== Bibliography ==
- Bronx, Humberto (1984). La veracruz de Medellín. Medellín: Copiyepes.
