= John Samuel Miller =

English naturalist

John Samuel Miller (26 February 1779 – 24 May 1830) was an English naturalist.

Miller, who was born Johann Müller, lived in Bristol. He was a Member of the Linnean Society. He wrote "Natural History of the Crinoides" (1821) online here and a "Memoir on the Belemnites" (Transactions of the Geological Society for 1832) and in 1822 "A list of the freshwater and landshells occurring in the environment of Bristol, with observations".
