= Nannobelus =

Scientific classification
- Kingdom: Animalia
- Phylum: Mollusca
- Class: Cephalopoda
- Superorder: †Belemnoidea
- Genus: †Nannobelus; Pavlow, 1913

Genus of molluscs

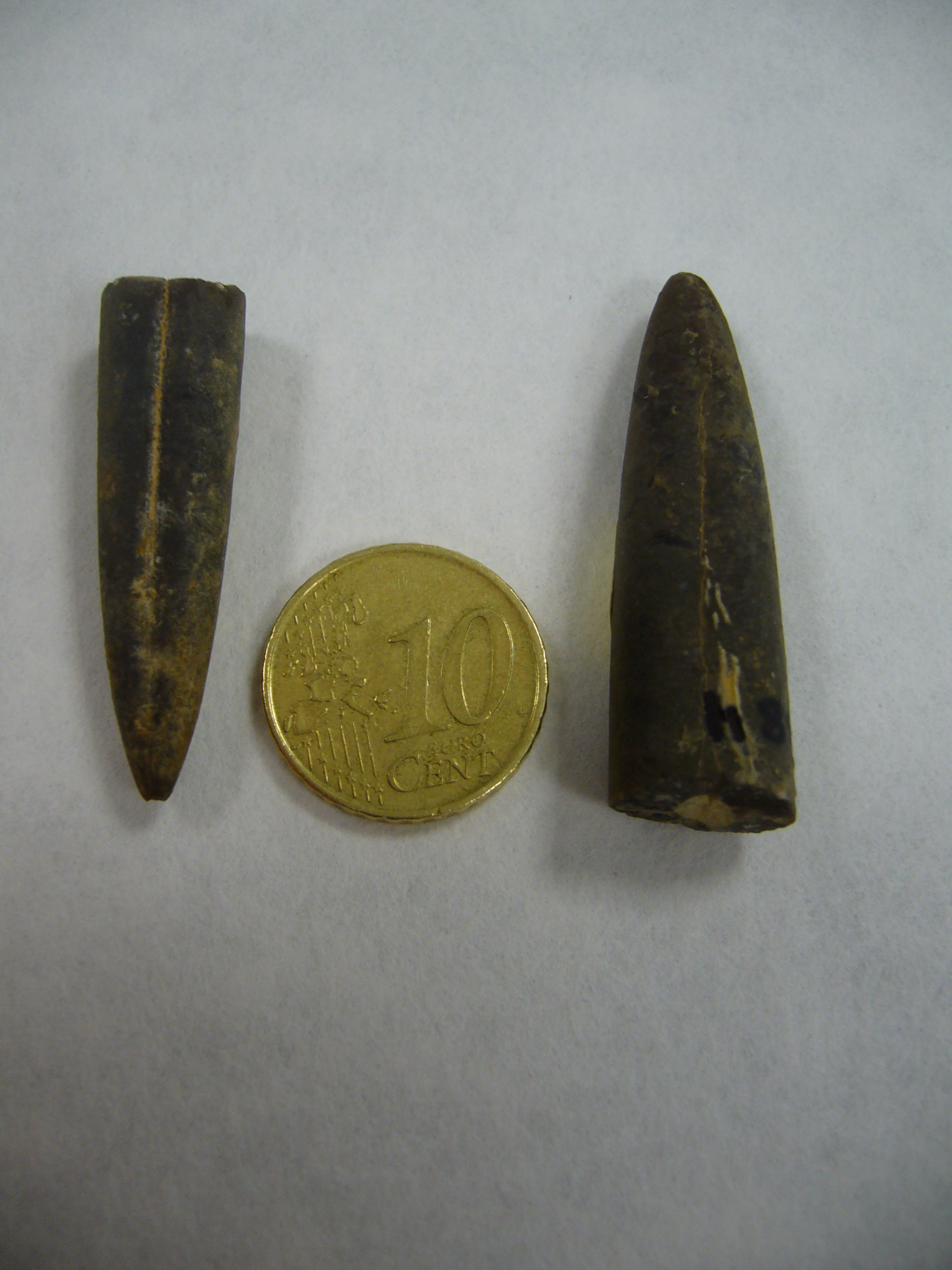
Nannobelus acutus fossil at the University of A Coruña

Nannobelus is a genus of belemnite, an extinct group of cephalopods.

== See also ==
- Belemnite
- List of belemnites
