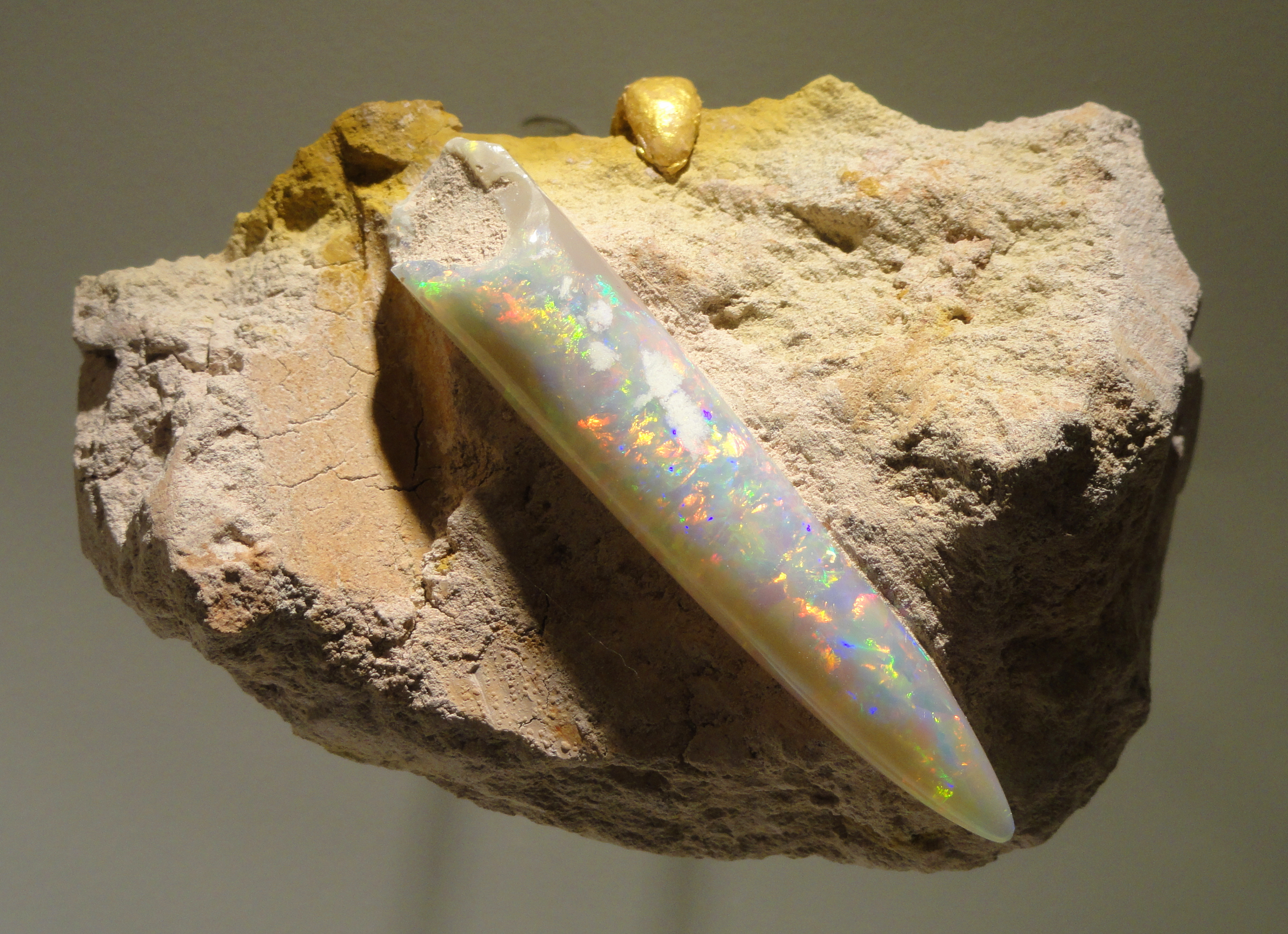
- Neohibolites sp. (opalized fossil)

Scientific classification
- Kingdom: Animalia
- Phylum: Mollusca
- Class: Cephalopoda
- Superorder: †Belemnoidea
- Genus: †Neohibolites

= Neohibolites =

Extinct genus of molluscs

Neohibolites is a genus of belemnite, an extinct group of cephalopods.

== See also ==
- Belemnite
- List of belemnites
