= Chondroteuthis =

Chondroteuthis Temporal range: Early Jurassic, ~183 Ma

Scientific classification
- Domain: Eukaryota
- Kingdom: Animalia
- Phylum: Mollusca
- Class: Cephalopoda
- Superorder: †Belemnoidea
- Genus: †Chondroteuthis; Bode, 1933

Type species
- †Chondroteuthis wunnenbergi Bode, 1933

Extinct genus of molluscs

Chondroteuthis is a genus of belemnite, an extinct group of cephalopods. It was found in the Schistes bitumineux of Luxembourg.

== See also ==
- Belemnite
- List of belemnites
