= Bayanoteuthis =

Bayanoteuthis Temporal range: Middle Eocene ~Lutetian–Bartonian

Scientific classification
- Kingdom: Animalia
- Phylum: Mollusca
- Class: Cephalopoda
- Order: †Belemnitida
- Family: †Bayanotheuthidae
- Genus: †Bayanoteuthis; Munier-Chalmas, 1872
- Species: †B. rugifer

Binomial name
- †Bayanoteuthis rugifer Schloenbach, 1868

Extinct genus of molluscs

Bayanoteuthis is an extinct genus of belemnite, an extinct group of cephalopods. Its fossils date from the Eocene, some tens of millions of years after the rest of the group went extinct, as such, it was long considered to be dubious in nature, and even if accepted was often excluded from Belemnitida, although this has recently changed with newer and better evidence confirming the belemnite affinities of this genus, and as such extending the range of the belemnites into the middle Eocene at the latest.

== See also ==
- Belemnite
- List of belemnites
