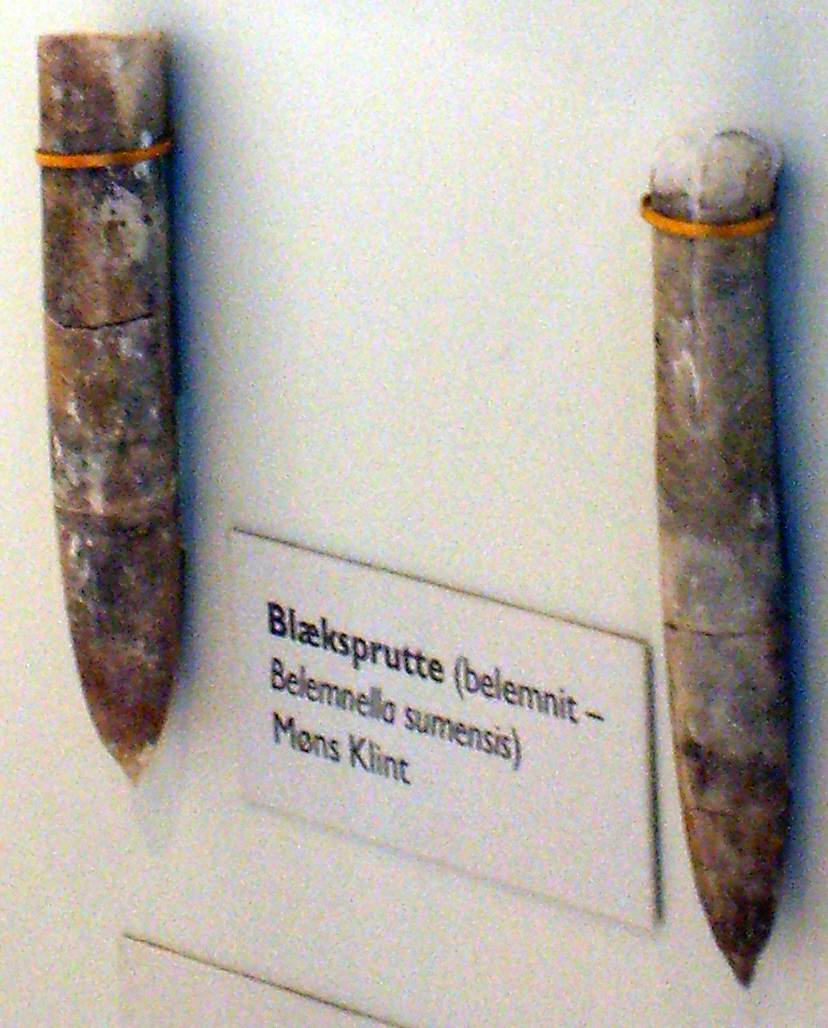
- B. sumensis and B. cimbrica fossils at the Geological Museum, Copenhagen

Scientific classification
- Domain: Eukaryota
- Kingdom: Animalia
- Phylum: Mollusca
- Class: Cephalopoda
- Superorder: †Belemnoidea
- Genus: †Belemnella

= Belemnella =

Belemnella Temporal range: 70.6–66.043 Ma

Extinct genus of belemnites

Belemnella is a genus of belemnite, an extinct group of cephalopods.

== See also ==
- Belemnite
- List of belemnites
