= Hematites =

Hematites Temporal range: Upper Mississippian (Chesteran)

Scientific classification
- Kingdom: Animalia
- Phylum: Mollusca
- Class: Cephalopoda
- Superorder: †Belemnoidea
- Genus: †Hematites; Flower & Gordon, 1959

Extinct genus of molluscs

Hematites is a genus of belemnite from the Mississippian Epoch.

== See also ==
- Belemnite
- List of belemnites
