= Aulacoteuthis =

Aulacoteuthis Temporal range: 130–125.45 Ma

Scientific classification
- Domain: Eukaryota
- Kingdom: Animalia
- Phylum: Mollusca
- Class: Cephalopoda
- Superorder: †Belemnoidea
- Genus: †Aulacoteuthis; Stolley, 1911

Type species
- Aulacoteuthis ernsti Mutterlose & Baraboshkin, 2003

Other species
- Aulacoteuthis compressa Mutterlose, 1983; Aulacoteuthis descendens Stolley, 1925; Aulacoteuthis speetonensis (Pavlow, 1892); ?Aulacoteuthis absolutiformis (Sinzow, 1877)

Extinct genus of molluscs

Aulacoteuthis is a genus of belemnite, an extinct group of cephalopods.

== See also ==
- Belemnite
- List of belemnites
