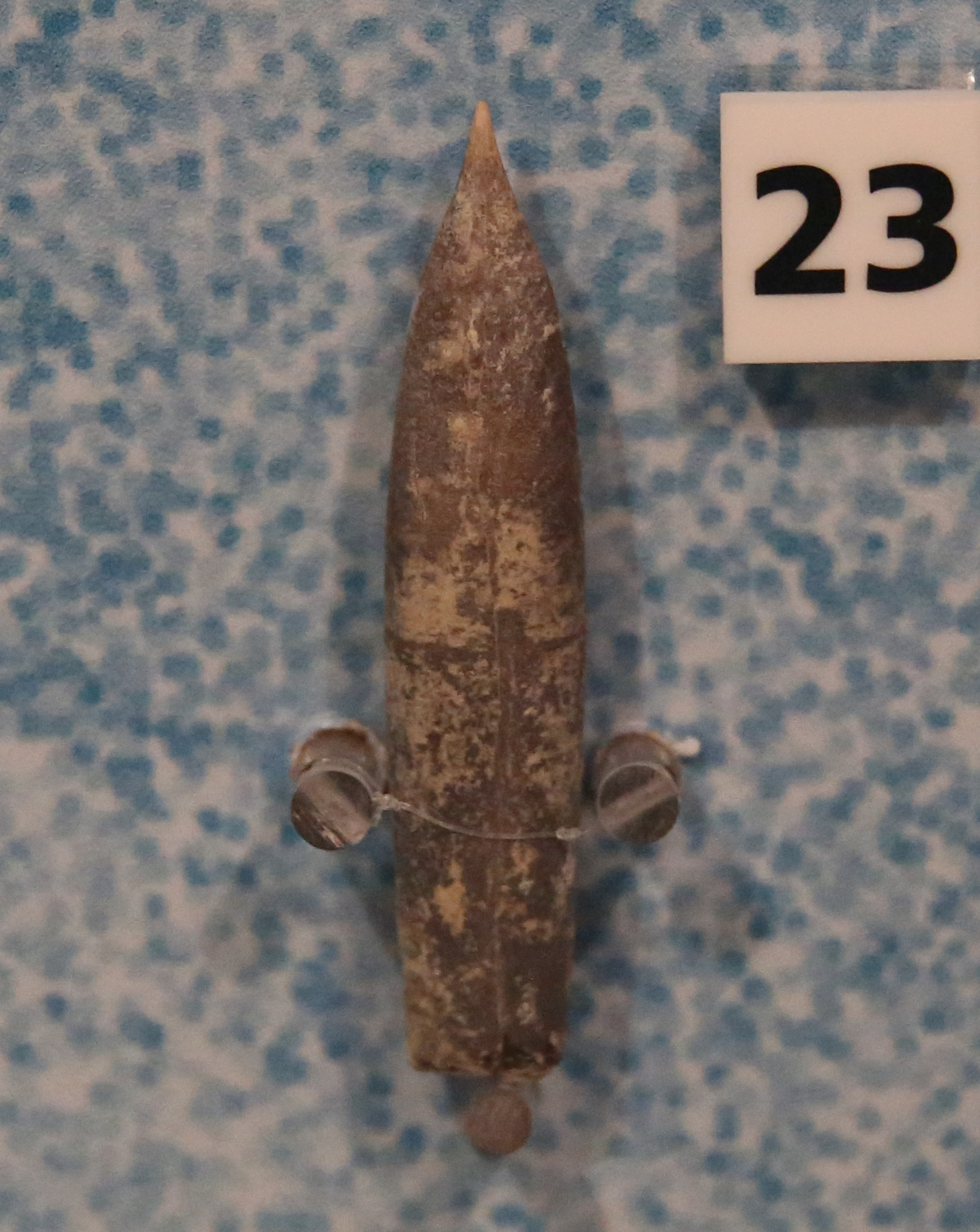
- Actinocamax plenus, Dinosaur Isle, Isle of Wight

Scientific classification
- Domain: Eukaryota
- Kingdom: Animalia
- Phylum: Mollusca
- Class: Cephalopoda
- Superorder: †Belemnoidea
- Genus: †Actinocamax; Miller 1823

= Actinocamax =

Actinocamax Temporal range: 94.3–70.6 Ma

Extinct genus of molluscs

Actinocamax (from Greek: ἀκτίς aktís, 'ray' and Greek: κάμαξ camax 'stake') is a genus of belemnite, an extinct group of cephalopods.

== See also ==
- Belemnite
- List of belemnites
