= Pseudodicoelites =

Pseudodicoelites Temporal range: Jurassic, 174.7–170.9 Ma

Scientific classification
- Kingdom: Animalia
- Phylum: Mollusca
- Class: Cephalopoda
- Superorder: †Belemnoidea
- Genus: Pseudodicoelites

Extinct genus of molluscs

Pseudodicoelites is a genus of belemnite, an extinct group of cephalopods. It is known from the Jurassic of Yukon in the Richardson Mountains.

== See also ==
- Belemnite
- List of belemnites
