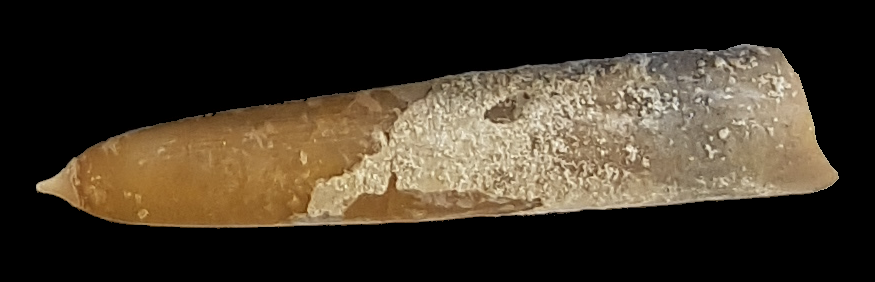
- G. quadrata found in the Kristianstad Basin, Sweden

Scientific classification
- Kingdom: Animalia
- Phylum: Mollusca
- Class: Cephalopoda
- Superorder: †Belemnoidea
- Genus: †Gonioteuthis

= Gonioteuthis =

Extinct genus of molluscs

Gonioteuthis (meaning narrow squid or slim squid) is a genus of belemnite, an extinct group of cephalopods. It grew to a body length (excluding tentacles) of 8 inches (20 centimeters) and fed on small marine animals. Fossils of Gonioteuthis have been found in the Netherlands, Germany, and Sweden in rocks dated to the late Cretaceous Period, specifically 85 to 70 million years ago.

== See also ==
- Belemnite
- List of belemnites
