= Eobelemnites =

Eobelemnites Temporal range: Lower Serpukhovian

Scientific classification
- Kingdom: Animalia
- Phylum: Mollusca
- Class: Cephalopoda
- Superorder: †Belemnoidea
- Genus: †Eobelemnites; Flower, 1945

Extinct genus of molluscs

Eobelemnites is a genus of belemnite from the Mississippian Epoch.

== See also ==
- List of belemnites
