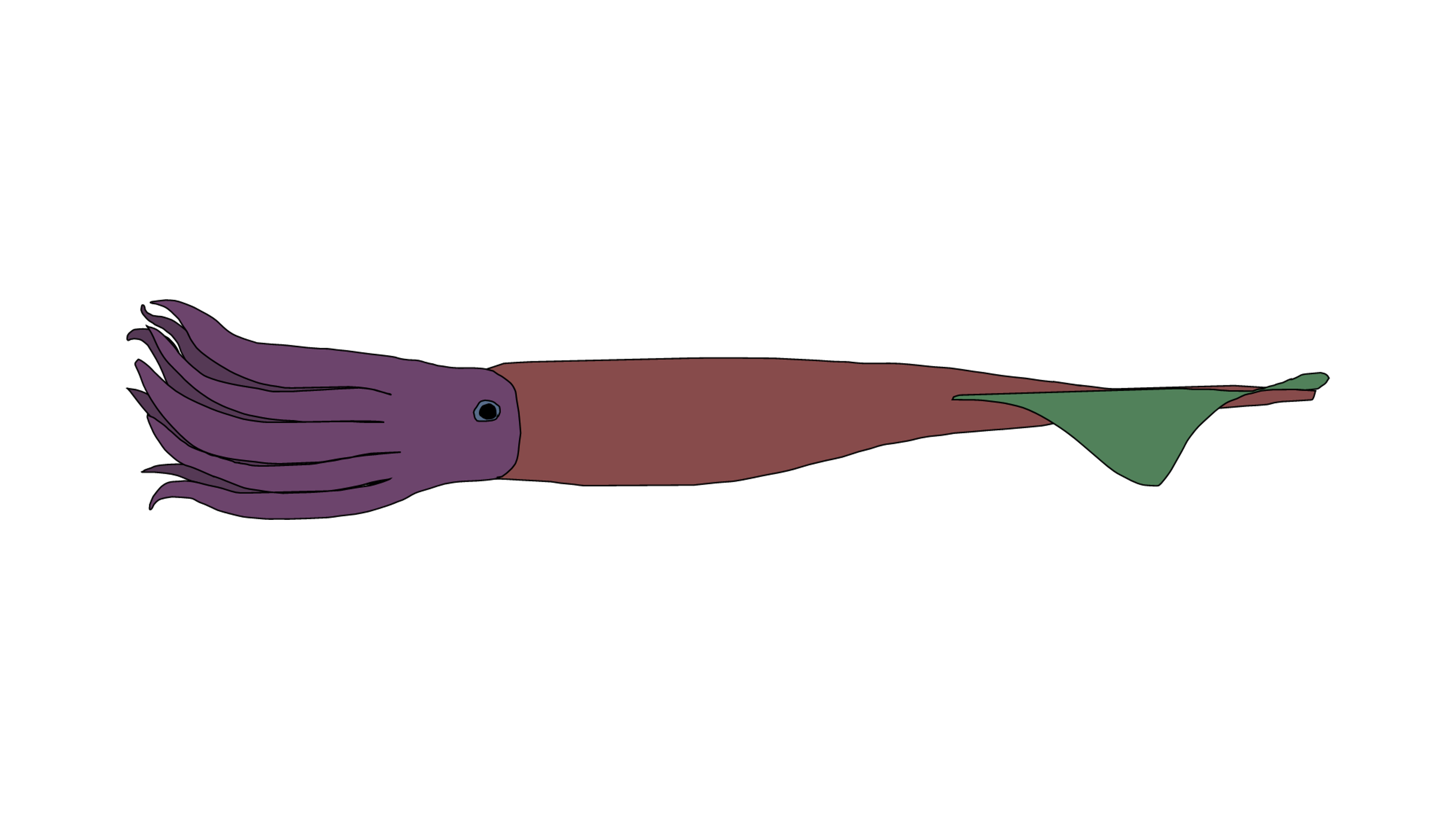

Scientific classification
- Domain: Eukaryota
- Kingdom: Animalia
- Phylum: Mollusca
- Class: Cephalopoda
- Superorder: †Belemnoidea
- Genus: †Acrocoelites; Lissajous, 1915

= Acrocoelites =

Acrocoelites Temporal range: 182–145.5 Ma

Extinct genus of molluscs

Acrocoelites is a genus of belemnite, an extinct group of cephalopods.

== Species ==
Species placed by fossilworks.

- Acrocoelites bobeti Lissajous 1927
- Acrocoelites brevisulcatus Quenstedt 1848
- Acrocoelites conoideus Oppel 1856
- Acrocoelites ilminstrensis Phillips 1867
- Acrocoelites inaequistriatus Simpson 1855
- Acrocoelites levidensis Simpson 1855
- Acrocoelites oxyconus Hehl 1831
- Acrocoelites pyramidalis Munster 1831
- Acrocoelites riegrafi Doyle 1992
- Acrocoelites rostriformis Theodori 1837
- Acrocoelites subtenuis Simpson 1855
- Acrocoelites tripartitus von Schlotheim 1820
- Acrocoelites vulgaris Young and Bird 1822

== See also ==
- Belemnite
- List of belemnites
