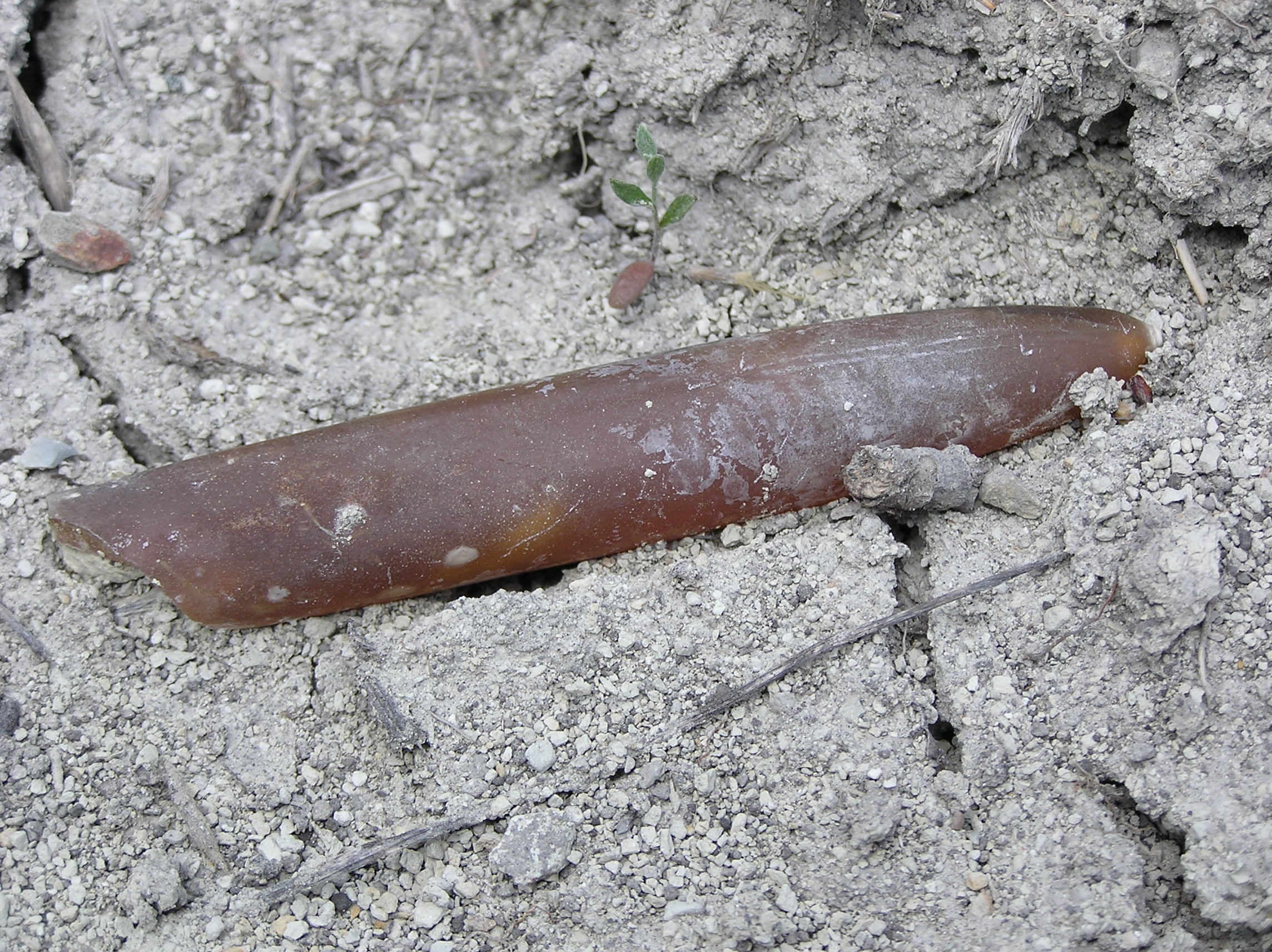

Scientific classification
- Kingdom: Animalia
- Phylum: Mollusca
- Class: Cephalopoda
- Order: †Belemnitida
- Family: †Mesohibolitidae
- Genus: †Hibolithes; Montfort, 1808

Species
- Hibolithes hastatus (Blainville, 1827); Hibolithes semisulcatus (Münster, 1830); Hibolithes catlinensis (Hector, 1878); Hibolithes conradi (Kilian, 1889); Hibolithes girardoti (Loriol, 1902); Hibolithes fellabrunnensis (Vetters, 1905); Hibolithes sangensis (Boden, 1911); Hibolithes jaculiformis (Shvetsov, 1913)

Synonyms
- Pseudohibolites (Bliithgen, 1936)

= Hibolithes =

Hibolithes Temporal range: Middle Jurassic - Early Cretaceous

Extinct genus of molluscs

Hibolithes is a genus of belemnites that lived from the Middle Jurassic to the Early Cretaceous, and has been found in Antarctica, Greenland, Iran, Europe, South America, and New Zealand. In 2020, this genus was found in the Pedawan Formation (Tithonian – Hauterivian) in Sarawak, on the island of Borneo (Malaysia).

== Species and sexual dimorphism ==
At least two Hibolithes species, H. conradi and H. semisulcatus, represented in Jurassic (Oxfordian and Tithonian) and possibly Early Cretaceous (Late Berriasian) zones of Hungary.

Hibolithes shimanskyi, H. orlovi and H. ivanovi from Upper Callovian-Lower Oxfordian of Bryansk Oblast and Saratov Oblast of European Russia, were described in 1976 by Gustomesov. In 2006, Ippolitov assigned H. shimanskyi as a synonym to H. girardoti due to sexual dimorphism within this species. Ippolitov also assigned H. orlovi and H. ivanovi as synonyms to H. sangensis for the same reason.
