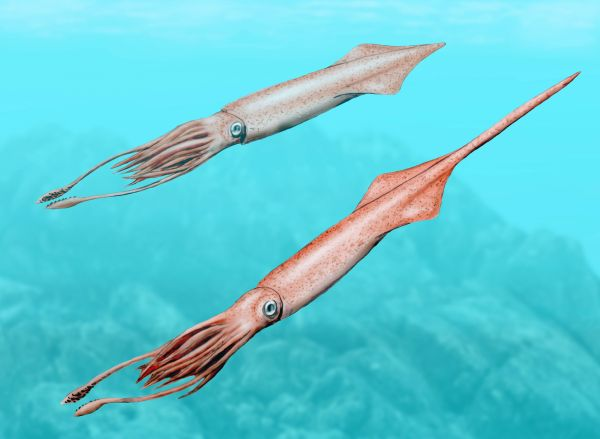
- Two Youngibelus, showing the male on the bottom with an epirostrum

Scientific classification
- Kingdom: Animalia
- Phylum: Mollusca
- Class: Cephalopoda
- Order: †Belemnitida
- Genus: †Youngibelus; Riegraf, 1980

Type species
- †Youngibelus tubularis (Young & Bird, 1822)

Other species
- †Youngibelus levis (Simpson, 1855)

= Youngibelus =

Youngibelus Temporal range: Jurassic

Genus of molluscs

Youngibelus is a genus of belemnites, an extinct group of cephalopods.

== Sexual dimorphism ==
Youngibelus tubularis and Y. levis are two species from Toarcian aged rocks in Yorkshire. It has been suggested that these two species are actually morphs of the same species. The divergence in morphology occurs in the gerontic stage of development, characterised by differences in the rostrum. In Y. levis, the rostrum thickens, whilst in Y. tubularis, an epirostrum develops. Peter Doyle proposed that the epirostrum developed as either a counterbalance for a sexual adaptation, or for display in courtship.
