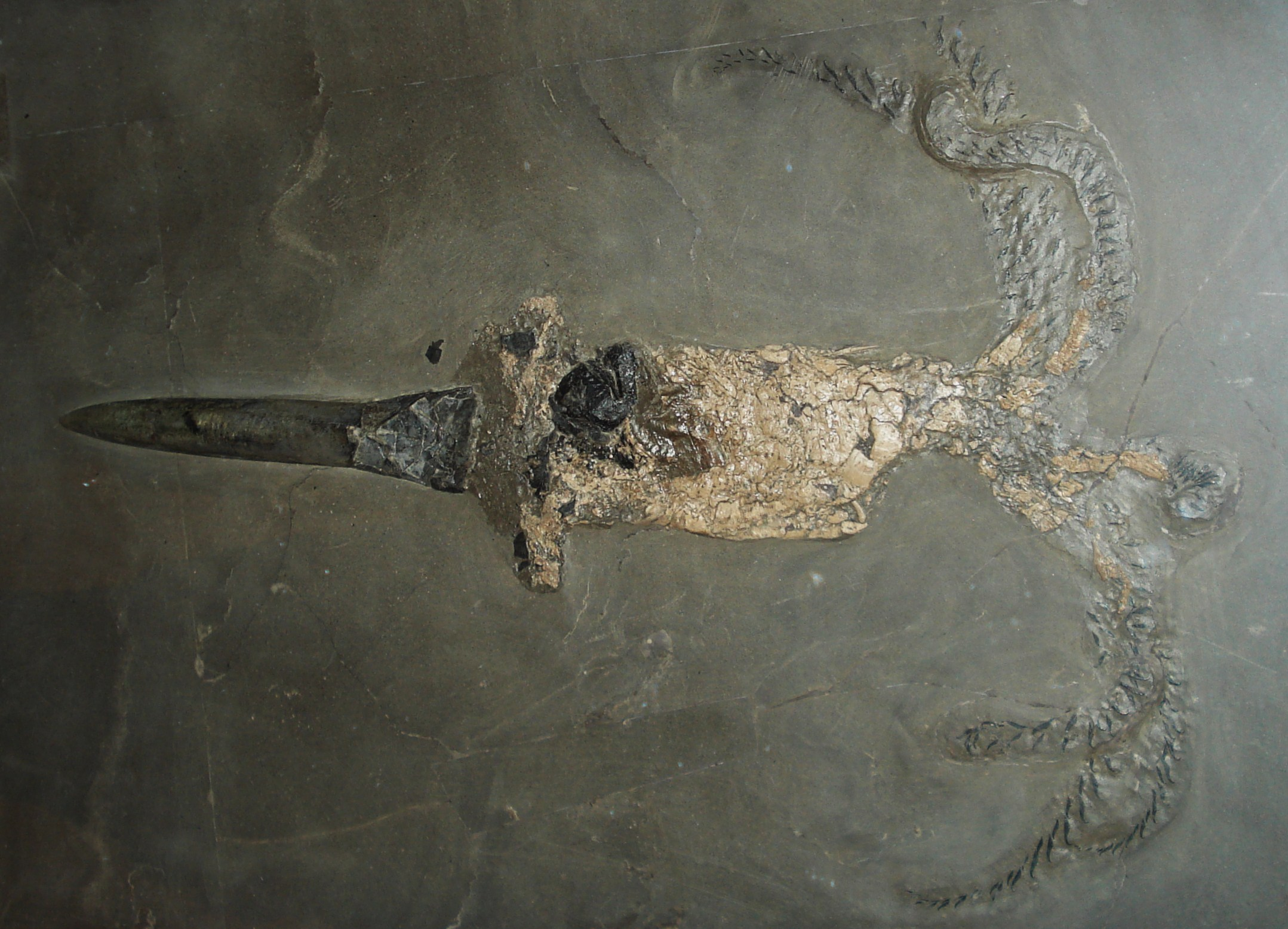
- The Early Jurassic Passaloteuthis bisulcata showing soft anatomy

Scientific classification
- Kingdom: Animalia
- Phylum: Mollusca
- Class: Cephalopoda
- Superorder: †Belemnoidea
- Order: †Belemnitida; Zittel, 1895

Suborders
- Belemnitina; Belemnopseina; Belemnotheutina; Pachybelemnopseina; Sinobelemnitidae

= Belemnitida =

Belemnites Temporal range: Carnian–Maastrichtian 234–66 Ma Disputed Eocene records

Extinct, squid-like, Mesozoic cephalopods

Belemnitida (or belemnites) is an extinct order of squid-like cephalopods that existed from the Late Triassic to Late Cretaceous (and possibly the Eocene). Unlike squid, belemnites had a mineralized internal skeleton that made up the cone. The parts are, from the arms-most to the tip, the tongue-shaped pro-ostracum, the conical phragmocone, and the pointed guard. The calcitic guard is the most common belemnite remain. Belemnites, in life, are thought to have had 10 hooked arms and a pair of fins on the guard. The chitinous hooks were usually no bigger than 5 mm (0.20 in), though a belemnite could have had between 100 and 800 hooks in total, using them to stab and hold onto prey.

Belemnites were an important food source for many Mesozoic marine creatures, both the adults and the planktonic juveniles and they likely played an important role in restructuring marine ecosystems after they rose to ecological prominence in the aftermath of the Triassic–Jurassic extinction event. While highly abundant for much of the Mesozoic, by the end of the Cretaceous, they had substantially declined relative to their apex during the Jurassic, likely as result of competition with modern coleoids like squid, and become geographically restricted to a few high latitude regions.

They may have laid between 100 and 1,000 eggs. Some species may have been adapted to speed and swam in the turbulent open ocean, whereas others resided in the calmer littoral zone (nearshore) and fed off the seafloor. The largest belemnite known, Megateuthis elliptica, would have measured up to 3.11 metres (10.2 ft) in total body length.

Belemnites were coleoids, a group that includes squid and octopuses, and are often grouped into the superorder Belemnoidea, though the higher classification of cephalopods is volatile and no clear consensus exists on how belemnites are related to modern coleoids. Guards can give information on the climate, habitat, and carbon cycle of the ancient waters they inhabited. Guards have been found since antiquity and have become part of folklore.

== Description ==
=== Shell ===
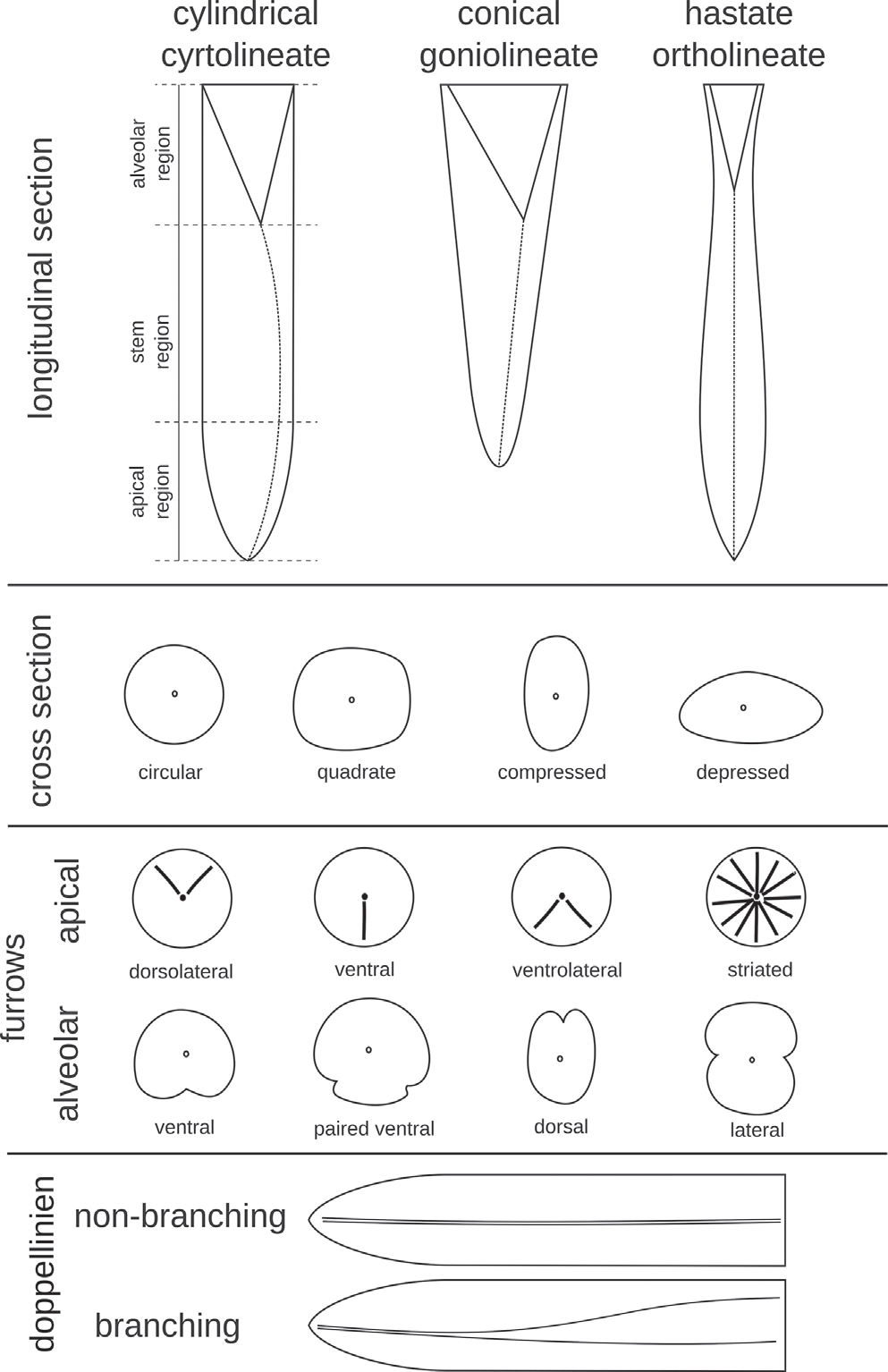
General morphology and terminations of the belemnite rostrum

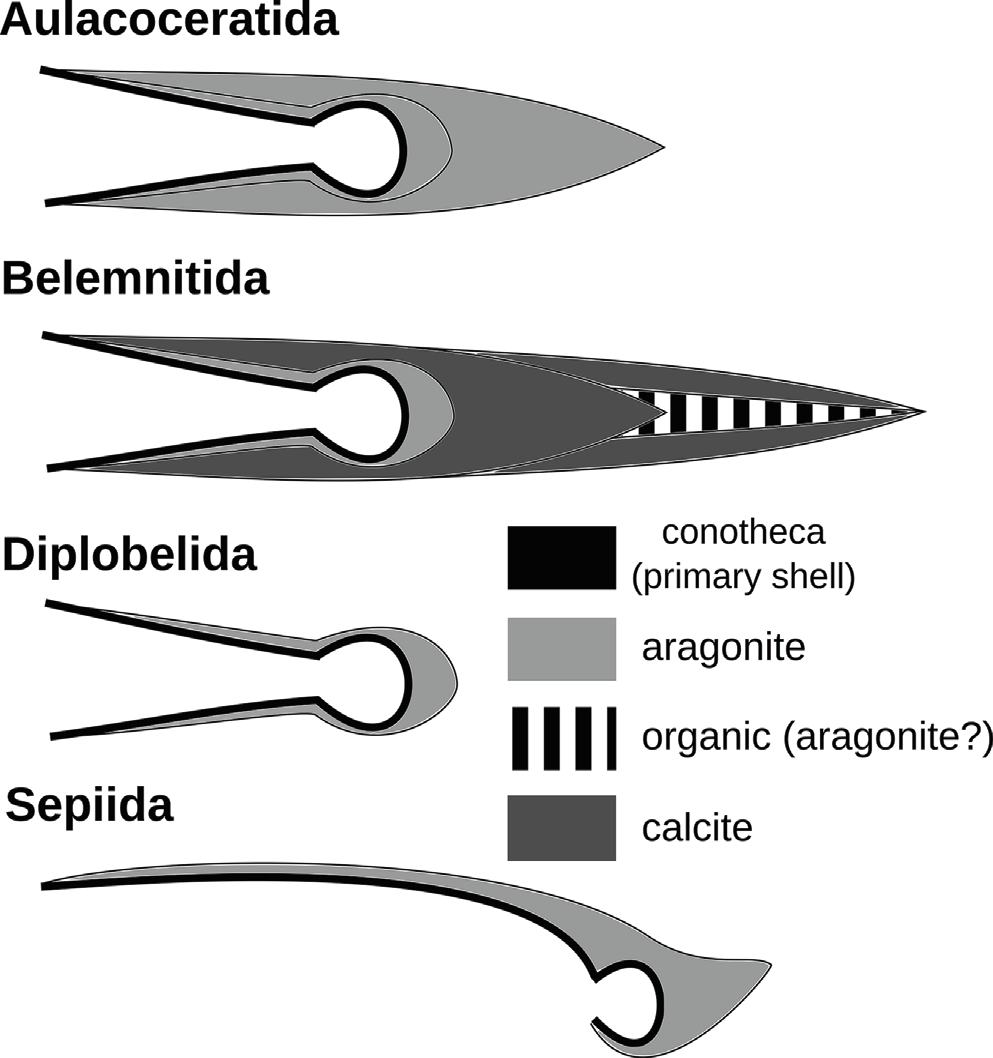
Shell morphology of belemnoids (Belemnitida in second)

The belemnite cone is composed of three parts. Going from arms to tip, these are the tongue-shaped pro-ostracum; the conical, chambered phragmocone; and the spear-shaped guard at the very tip. The guard is attached to the phragmocone in a socket called the alveolus. The cone, in life, would have been encased in muscle and connective tissue. They had calcite guards, and aragonite pro-ostraca and phragmocones, though a few belemnites also had aragonite guards, and the alveolar side of the guards of belemnitellids may have also been of aragonite. The pro-ostracum probably supported the soft parts of the belemnite, similar to the gladius of squid, and completely surrounded the phragmocone.

The phragmocone was divided by septa into chambers, much like the shells of cuttlefish and nautiluses. The chambered phragmocone was probably the center of buoyancy, so was positioned directly above the center of mass for stability purposes. Concerning buoyancy, belemnites may have behaved much like modern ram's horn squid, having the chambers of the phragmocone flooded and slowly releasing more seawater via the siphuncle tube as the animal increases in size and weight over its lifetime to maintain neutral buoyancy. At the tip of the phragmocone beneath the guard is a tiny, cup-like protoconch, the remains of the embryonic shell.

The dense guard probably served to counterbalance the weight of the soft parts in the mantle cavity near the arms on the opposite end of the animal, analogous to the camera of nautiloids. This would have allowed the animal to move horizontally through the water. The guard may have also served to cut through waves while swimming at the surface, though modern cephalopods generally stay completely submerged. Though unlikely, fossilization possibly increased the perceived density of the guard, and it may have been up to 20% more porous in life. Fins may have been attached to the guard, or the guard may have lent support for large fins. Including arms, guards could have accounted for one-fifth to one-third of the total length of a belemnite.

=== Soft anatomy ===
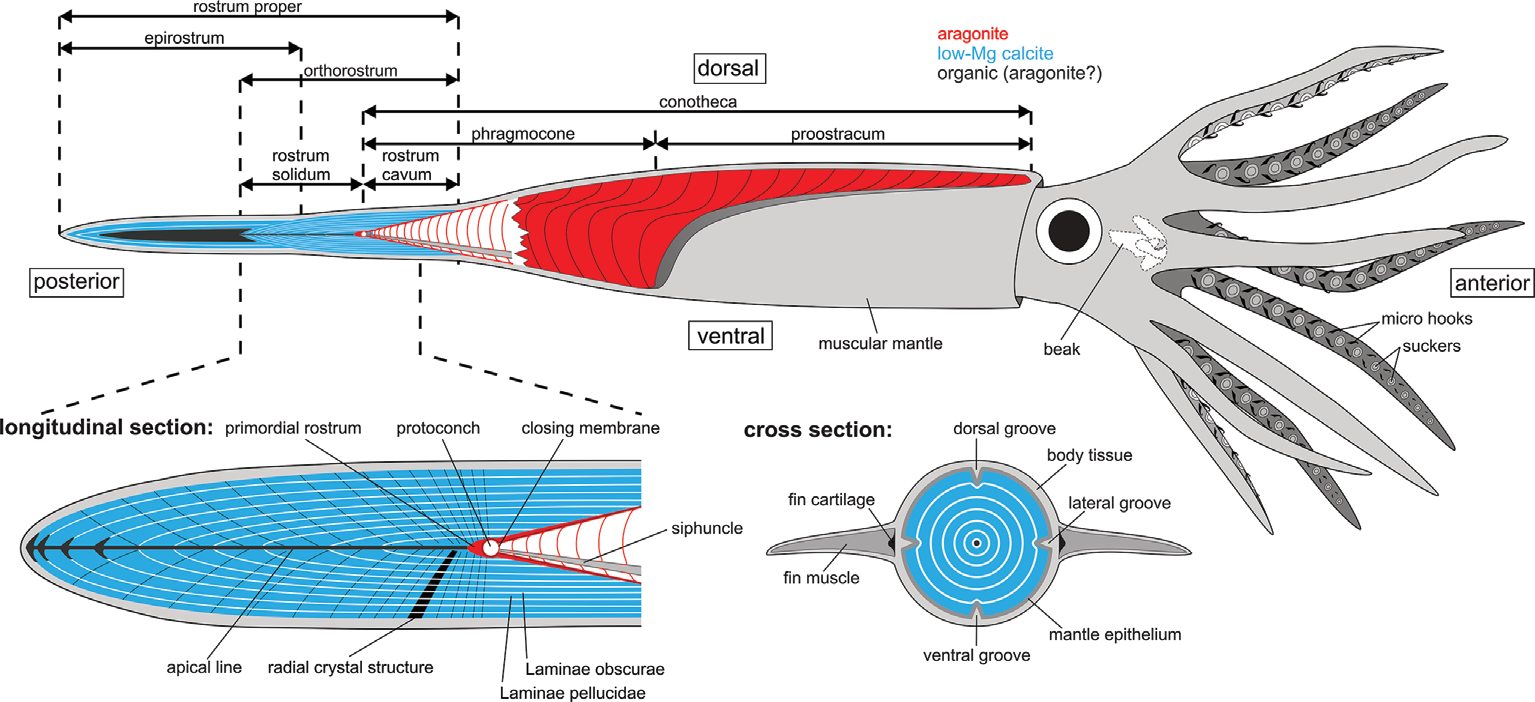
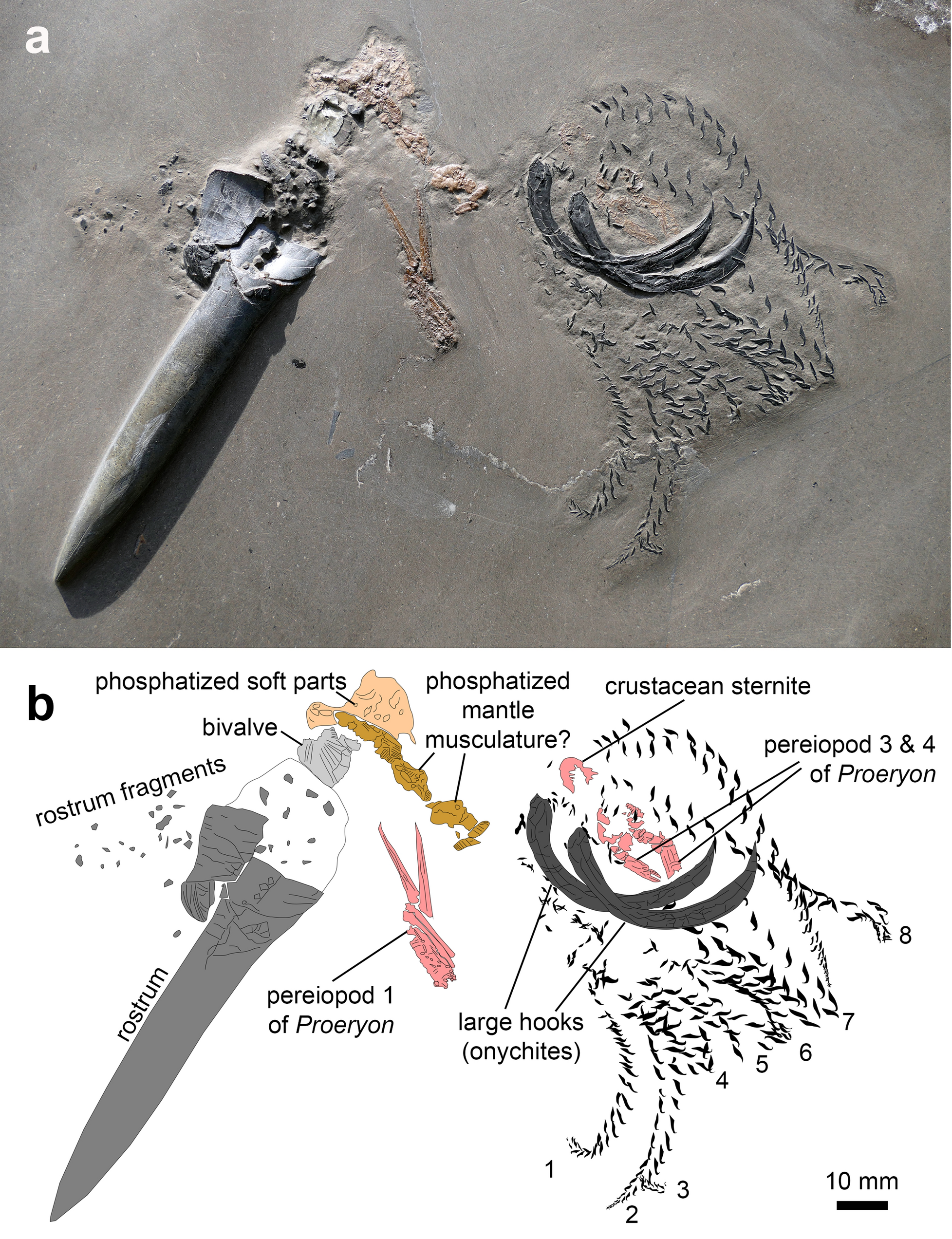
Shell, guard, and tissue anatomy of belemnitids (above). Preserved soft body elements of the Early Jurassic Passaloteuthis (below)

Belemnites had a radula—the "tongue" embedded in the buccal mass, the first part of a gastropod digestive system—similar to open-ocean predatory cephalopods. The radula had rows of seven teeth, consistent with modern predatory squid. The statocysts—which give a sense of balance and function much like the cochlea of the ear—were large, much like in modern fast-moving squid. Like other cephalopods, the skin was likely thin and slippery. The eyeballs were likely thicker, stronger, and more convex than in other cephalopods.

The mantle cavity of cephalopods serves to contain the gills, gonads, and other organs; also, water is siphoned into and expelled out of the mantle cavity via a tube opening near the arms of the animal, the hyponome, for jet propulsion. Though the hyponome was well-developed in belemnites, the phragmocone was large, implying a small mantle cavity and thus less efficient jet propulsion. Like some modern squid, belemnites may have mainly used large fins to coast along currents. Two Acanthoteuthis specimens with preserved soft-anatomy elements had a pair of rhomboid fins near the top of their guards; however, the specimens had different-sized fins, possibly owing to sexual dimorphism, age, or distortion during fossilization. These specimens appeared to have had similar adaptations to modern squid for speed, and may have been able to reach similar maximum speeds of 1.1 to 1.8 km/h (0.68 to 1.12 mph) like modern migrating Todarodes flying squid.

=== Limbs and hooks ===
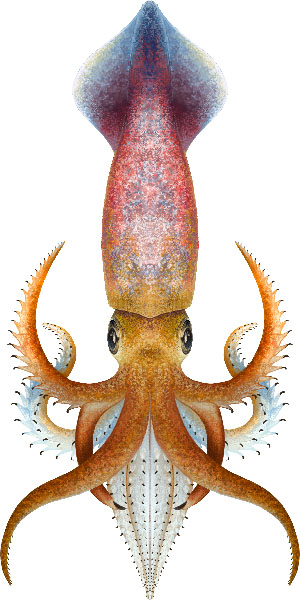
Reconstruction of the belemnite Passaloteuthis

Belemnites had 10 hooked arms of more or less equal length with suckers. The hooks were rarely larger than 5 mm (0.20 in), and increased in size toward the midsection of the arm, possibly because the midsection is where maximum power could be exerted when grabbing, or bigger hooks on the extremities of the arm increased the risk of losing the arm. Having two rows of hooks covering the entire breadth of the arm, a belemnite could have had between 100 and 800 hooks in total. Some hooks have a spur just above the base, but this may be a distortion from fossilization or preparation of the material. The chitinous hooks are subdivided into three sections: The base—which can be either flat or concave—the shaft—which projects either upward at an incline either straight or bent—and the uncinus—which can be hook- or saber-like. Overall, they were fish-hook shaped, and probably only the uncinus was exposed.

Different hook shapes were probably specialized for certain tasks, for example, a strongly hooked uncinus was designed to stab prey at a constant angle. It would force and sink in deeper if the prey tried to move away from the belemnite. Hook shapes and forms vary from species to species. In Chondroteuthis, large hooks were common near the mouth, and were either used for surrounding small prey or ramming into large prey, but these large hooks were not present in a small specimen, indicating it was either a juvenile, and the development of different hooks coincided with a difference in prey selection, or the specimen was a female and the hooks were used by males for male-on-male combat or during copulation. In modern hook-bearing squid species, only matured males have hooks, indicating a reproductive purpose. The hooks, being analogous to suckers, possibly could move.

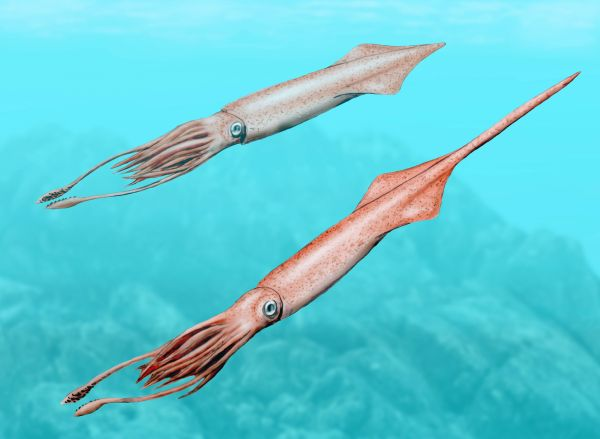
The Jurassic Youngibelus reconstructed with hectocotyli

The males, like in modern squid, probably had one or two hectocotyli—long, modified arms used in copulation or combat with other males. Instead of several hooks, the hectocotyli feature a pair of enlarged hooks—mega-onychites—to latch onto the female at a safe distance to prevent getting stuck with one of her hooks. Like squid, the positioning of the mega-onychites could have been either at the tip or origin of the arm depending on the species. Copulation probably involved the male depositing spermatophores into the female's internal mantle chamber.

=== Development ===
Like other cephalopods, belemnites may have laid floating egg masses, and a single female may have laid between 100 and 1,000 eggs. Hatchlings were either miniature forms of adults or went through a larval stage. According to the latter model, the egg was formed by the protoconch and a single-layered shell wall. During the larval stage, the protoconch became internal and the guard began to form. The embryo of Passaloteuthis, the most well-studied among belemnite embryos, had a protoconch, a developing guard, and a solid guard. The developing guard tightly surrounded the protoconch. The embryonic shell consisted of an ovoid protoconch and several chambers. The protoconch had two layers, and several compartments—called "protoconch pockets"—formed between the layers, which may have stored gas or liquid in life to stay buoyant. The protoconch and guard were probably made of chitin, a protective material that may have allowed the embryo to survive at greater depths and colder temperatures, develop into adults faster, and allow juveniles and adults to venture into deeper waters. Further, the protoconch would have allowed them to form limbs before reaching the phragmocone stage, and thus inhabit the open ocean earlier. These may have allowed belemnites to colonize a range of habitats across the world.

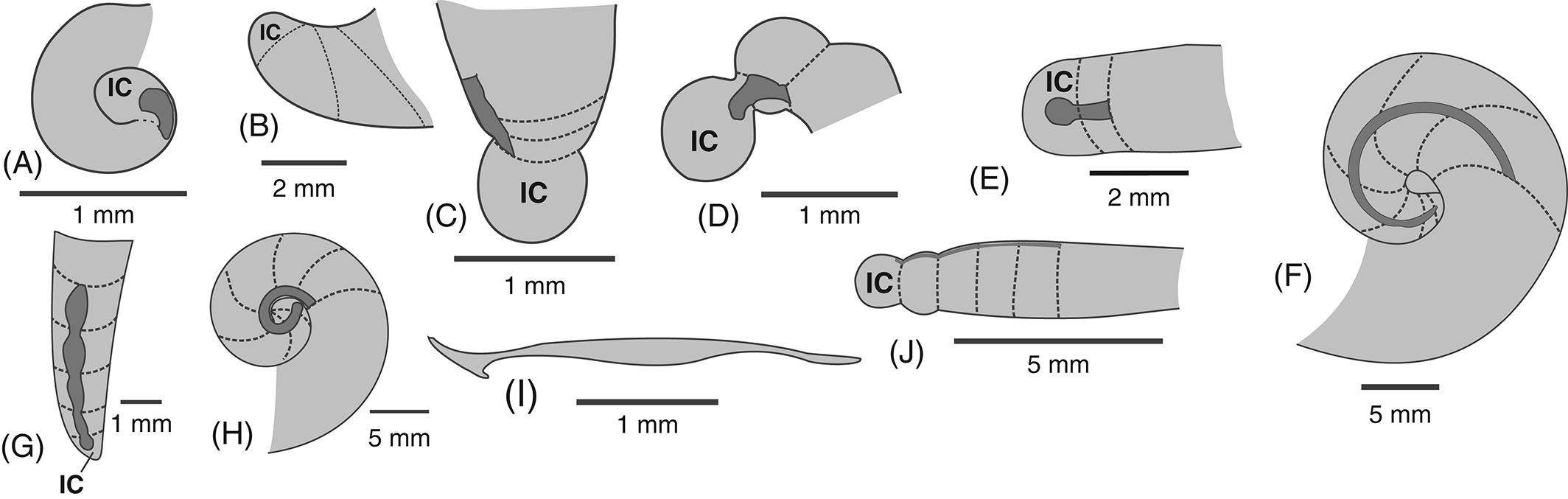
Cephalopod embryonic shells. A) Ammonoidea (B) Sepiida (C) Belemnoidea (D) Spirulida (E) Orthocerida (F) Nautilida (G) Oncocerida (H) Pseudorthocerida (I) Oegopsina (J) Bactritida. IC indicates the initial chamber.

Much like in cuttlefish, nautiluses, and ammonites, the number and successive size of the chambers of the phragmocone are used to analyze the growth of an individual over its life. Successive belemnite chambers tend to increase in size exponentially. Unlike other cephalopods, no decreasing trend of chamber size is seen in the earliest stages. The decreasing trend generally coincides with hatching, meaning embryonic belemnites had no or few chambers and hatched only with a protoconch. The phragmocone, thus, developed after hatching. Ammonites are thought to have done the same, implying a similar reproductive strategy, and, considering both reached cosmopolitan distributions, a rather efficient one. Belemnite hatchling protoconches are estimated to have been generally around 1.5 to 3 mm (0.059 to 0.118 in).

The guards of Megateuthis elliptica are the largest among belemnites, measuring 60 to 70 cm (24 to 28 in) in length and up to 50 mm (2.0 in) in diameter. The Cretaceous Neohibolites is one of the smallest known with a guard length of around 3 cm (1.2 in). In the New Zealand Belemnopsis, four major annual growth stages were preserved in the guard, giving belemnites a lifespan of about three to four years. The mesohibolitid belemnites, using the same methods, had a lifespan of about a year. In Megateuthis, the guard was demonstrated to have fully developed after one or two years, and growth spurts followed the lunar cycle.

=== Pathology ===
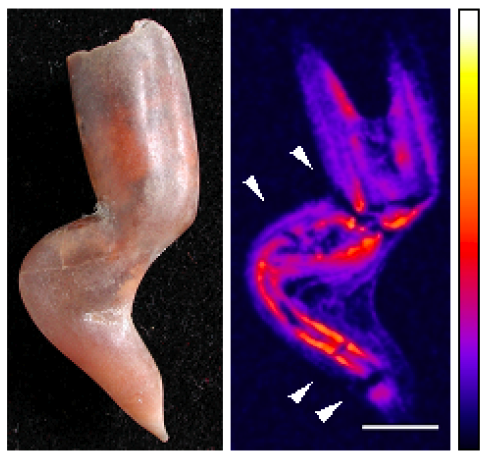
MRI of a deformed Late Cretaceous Gonioteuthis guard

Belemnite guards have sometimes been found with fractures with signs of healing. These have been interpreted in the past as evidence of digging, with belemnites using their guard to dig up prey on the seafloor; belemnites are now generally interpreted to have been open ocean predators. A deformed, zigzag-like guard of a Gonioteuthis was likely the result of a failed predation attempt. Two other Gonioteuthis guard specimens exhibit a double-pointed tip, probably stemming from some traumatic event. One belemnite guard also presents a double-pointed tip, with one of the points projecting higher than the other, probably a sign of an infection or settlement of a parasite. A Neoclavibelus guard features a large growth on the side likely stemming from a parasitic infection. A Hibolithes guard shows a large ovoid bubble near the base, likely deriving from a parasitic cyst. A Goniocamax guard has several blister-like formations, thought to have come from a polychaete endoparasitic infection.

The calcitic guards were desirable habitats for boring parasites indicated by the diversity of trace fossils left on some guards, including the sponge Entobia, worm Trypanites, and barnacle Rogerella.

== Taxonomy ==
=== Evolution and extinction ===
Map of the world in the Late Triassic

Belemnites, being coleoids, derive from the orthoconic (conical) Devonian belemnoid order Aulacocerida, which, in turn, is derived from the Devonian Bactritida. Belemnites were traditionally thought to have evolved in northern Europe in the Hettangian age of the Early Jurassic 201.6–197 million years ago (mya) and later spread to the rest of the world by the Pliensbachian age 190 mya. However, the 2012 study of early Asian forms classified into the family Sinobelemnitidae extended their earliest known record to the Carnian age of the Late Triassic. Belemnites probably originated in the Asian part of the Panthalassic Ocean around the eastern coasts of the ancient continent of Laurasia in a cephalopod radiation, alongside the octopus-like Prototeuthina and the belemnoid Phragmoteuthida. A dubious Permian occurrence, the Palaeobelemnopsidae, was reported from Southern China. By the Early Jurassic, belemnites were probably quite common, having spread out into the western Laurasian coasts and Gondwanan waters to the south.

Guard shapes in the early Jurassic ranged from conical to spearheaded, but spearheaded became more prevalent as the Jurassic progressed. This was probably due to pressure to become more streamlined and increase swimming efficiency, coevolving with increasingly faster predators and competitors. Their early evolution and apparent abundance were likely important in reconstructing marine ecosystems after the Triassic–Jurassic extinction event, providing an ample food source for marine reptiles and sharks.

The Belemnoidea, as a group, seemed to feature a reduction of the projection of the otherwise-conical phragmocone into the pro-ostracum. That of the most ancient order Aulacocerida is orthoconic (none projects), Phragmoteuthida three-quarters projects, Belemnitida a quarter, and the most developed Diplobelida an eighth.

Neocoleoidea (the group which includes modern squid, cuttlefish and octopuses) diversified and began to outcompete belemnites by the Late Jurassic to Early Cretaceous. In the North Pacific, belemnites had become extinct by the end of the Early Cretaceous. Belemnites declined through the Late Cretaceous, and their range became more restricted to higher latitudes and the polar regions; the southern populations (belonging to the family Dimitobelidae) became extinct in the early Maastrichtian, and the last belemnites—of the family Belemnitellidae—inhabited what is now northern Europe. They finally became extinct in the Cretaceous–Paleogene extinction event, around 66 mya, where, like in ammonites, it is thought the protoconch of embryos could not survive the ensuing acidification of the oceans. However, the possible belemnite genus Bayanoteuthis is reported from the Eocene of Europe, though this is often excluded from Belemnitida. However, a 2026 supported the validity of Bayanoteuthis as a true belemnite that lived in the Eocene, rather than having originated in older rocks and redeposited, suggesting a long ghost lineage of over 20 million years.

Following the extinction of the belemnites at the end of the Cretaceous, holoplanktonic gastropods, namely sea butterflies, replaced planktonic belemnite larvae at the base of the food chain.

=== Research history ===
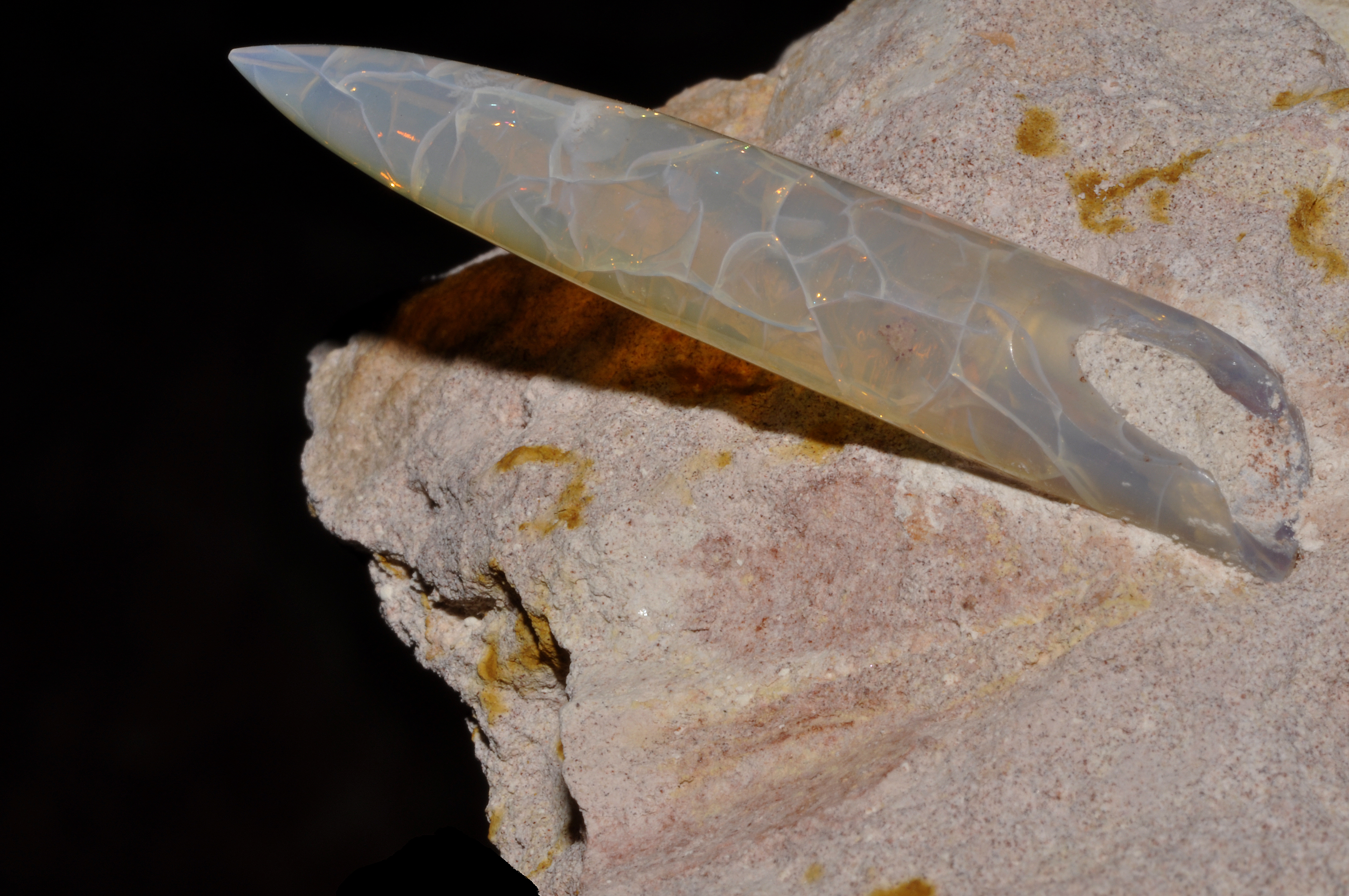
Opalized Peratobelus guard from the Early Cretaceous

The first mention of belemnites in writing comes from the Greek philosopher Theophrastus, who lived in the 4th and 3rd century BCE, in his book De Animalibus Quæ Dicuntur Invidere who described it as lyngurium, lynx urine which had been buried and solidified. Pliny the Elder, in the first century CE, did not believe in lyngurium and called the gemstone a belemnite for the first time—though not recognizing it as a fossil. The name is from Ancient Greek βέλεμνον bélemnon meaning dart for the guard's shape. Subsequent authors either considered it to be lyngurium or amber. The first mention of a belemnite representing a fossil was made in 1546 by German mineralogist Georgius Agricola, and subsequent authors gave several hypotheses to its nature in life, including them being shellfish, sea urchin spines, sea cucumbers, coral polyps, or some internal shell.

In 1823, English naturalist John Samuel Miller classified belemnites as cephalopods, comparing the newly discovered phragmocone remains to that of a nautilus, and concluding a resemblance to Sepia cuttlefish. He also erected the genus Belemnites with 11 species. This classification was confirmed when the first impressions of belemnite soft body anatomy were described by English paleontologist Richard Owen in 1844. In 1895, German paleontologist Karl Alfred Ritter von Zittel organized the clade Belemnoidea and included the families Belemnitidae, Asteroconites, and Xiphoteuthis.

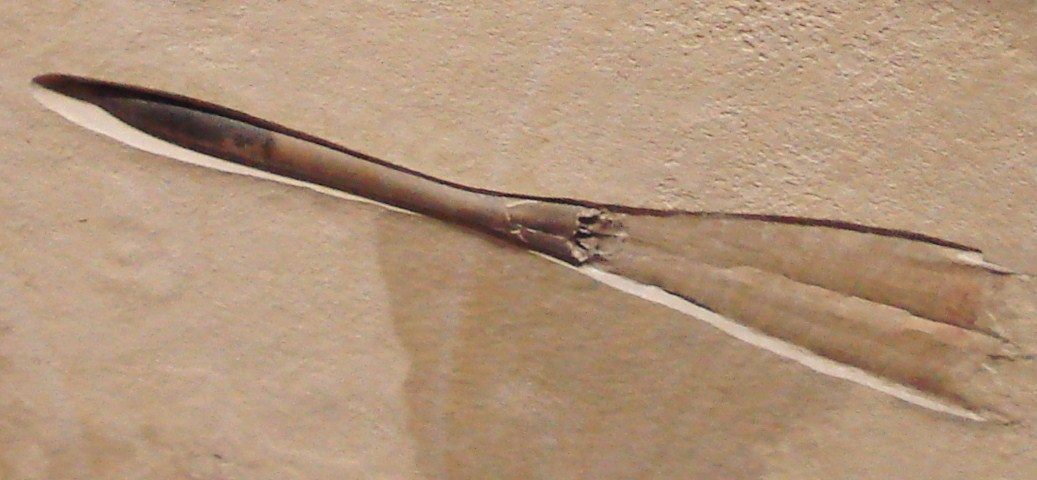
Hibolites from the early Cretaceous at the State Museum of Natural History Stuttgart

The guard—also known as the rostrum, scabbard, gaine, and sheath—is the part of the animal most likely to be fossilized. Guards are difficult to distinguish at the species level, and, consequently, synonyms are common and inflate the group's apparent diversity. Preserved hooks can be used to distinguish belemnite species as each species has unique hook shapes. However, scolecodont segmented worm fossils have been mistaken for belemnite hooks and vice versa. Preserved fossil guards are used to measure the ancient isotopic signature of the waters the individual inhabited in life, which gives information on the climate, habitat, and carbon cycle.

=== Phylogeny ===
Belemnites were cephalopods. Having no outer shells, they are classified into the subclass Coleoidea. In 1994, American geologist Peter Doyle defined Coleoidea as composed of three superorders: Decapodiformes (squid and cuttlefish), Octopodiformes (octopuses), and Belemnoidea; with Belemnoidea containing the orders Aulacocerida, Diplobelida, and Belemnitida. Also, the order Phragmoteuthida is sometimes believed to be a sister group to Belemnoidea, but Doyle considered it to be a stem-group to Decapodiformes and Octopodiformes.

Coleoidea

- Coleoidea
  - - †Aulacocerida
    - - †Diplobelida
      - †Belemnitida
  - - †Phragmoteuthida
    - - Octopodiformes
      - Decapodiformes

Classification of Coleoidea according to Doyle 1994

However, the higher classification of cephalopods is volatile with no clear consensus. Coleoidea is sometimes divided into Neocoleoidea (containing all modern cephalopods) and Paleocoleoidea (containing Belemnoidea), so belemnites would be a sister group of modern cephalopods. However, this grouping is probably paraphyletic—it does not contain a common ancestor and all its descendants—and, thus, invalid. According to some authors, belemnites were a stem-group of Decapodiformes:

Cephalopoda

- Cephalopoda
  - Nautiloidea
  - - †Ammonoidea
    - Coleoidea
      - †Bactritida
      - - †Aulacocerida
        - - Octopodiformes
          - †Phragmoteuthida
          - †Belemnitida
          - †Diplobelida
          - Decapodiformes
            - Oegopsida
            - Myopsida
            - Sepiida
            - Sepiolida
            - Spirulida

- Cephalopoda
  - Nautilidae
  - Coleoidea
    - Decapodiformes
      - - - - Loliginidae
            - Ommastrephidae
          - - Spirulidae
            - Sepiidae
        - Sepiolidae
      - †Belemnitida
    - Octopodiformes

Top: Belemnitida outside Decapodiformes. Bottom: Belemnitida as a stem-group of Decapodiformes

According to the "belemnoid root-stock theory", belemnoids gave rise to modern coleoids sometime in the Mesozoic, with octopuses deriving from Phragmoteuthida and squid from Diplobelida, making Belemnoidea paraphyletic. The spirulid Longibelus could be a transitional species between belemnoids and squid. However, molecular evidence suggests that the squid and octopus lineage diverged from Belemnoidea in the Permian.

Coleoidea

- Coleoidea
  - †Hematitida
  - †Donovaniconida
  - - †Aulacocerida
    - - - Octopodiformes
        - †Phragmoteuthida
      - †Belemnitida
      - - †Diplobelida
        - Decapodiformes

"Belemnoid root-stock theory"

The order Belemnitida is a monophyletic taxon, consisting of a common ancestor and all of its descendants, and is characterized by the possession of ten hooked appendages, a multilayered outer wall of the phragmocone, and a septum between the pro-ostracum and the phragmocone. Belemnitida is separated into two suborders: Belemnitina and Belemnopseina, though a third possible suborder may exist with Sinobelemnitidae. The Belemnopseina guards have a groove on their alveolus, whereas the Belemnitina have a groove at their apex. The grooves probably corresponded to blood vessels. Another suborder, Belemnotheutina, is also proposed, whose members have an aragonitic guard in contrast to the calcitic guards of other belemnites. Aragonitic guards are usually only seen in the ancestral Aulacocerida belemnoids, and Belemnotheutina may represent a transitional stage between the two orders, though some believe Belemnitida derived from Phragmoteuthida which derived from Aulacocerida.

Belemnitida genera
- Family Dimitobelidae
  - Conobelus
  - Dimitobelus
  - Pumiliobelus
- Family Belemnitellidae
  - Actinocamax
  - Belemnitella
  - Belemnites
- Family Belemnopseidae
  - Belemnopsis
  - Vaunagites
- Family Cylindroteuthidae
  - Cylindroteuthis
- Family Dicoelitidae
  - Dicoelites
- Family Duvaliidae
  - Duvalia
  - Pseudobelus
  - Rhopaloteuthis
  - Pseudoduvalia
- Family Hastitidae
  - Hastites
  - Pleurobelus
  - Rhabdobelus
  - Bairstowius
- Family Halcobelidae
  - Holcobelus
  - Calabribelus
  - Lissajousibelus
- Family Megateuthidae
  - Acrocoelites
  - Cuspiteuthis
  - Dactyloteuthis
  - Megateuthis
- Family Mesohibolithidae
  - Curtohibolithes
  - Hibolithes
  - Mesohibolithes
- Family Nipponoteuthidae
  - Nipponoteuthis
- Family Oxyteuthidae
  - Oxyteuthis
- Family Passaloteuthidae
  - Acroteuthis
  - Angeloteuthis
  - Brevibelus
  - Clastoteuthis
  - Parapassaloteuthis
  - Passaloteuthis
  - Pseudohastites
- Family Pseudodicoelitidae
  - Pseudodicoelites
- Family Salpingoteuthidae
  - Salpingoteuthis
- Family Sinobelemnitidae
  - Sichuanobelus
- Incertae sedis
  - Aulacoteuthis
  - Belemnella
  - Coeloteuthis
  - Eobelemnites
  - Gonioteuthis
  - Nannobelus
  - Pachyteuthis
  - Simpsonibelus
  - Youngibelus
  - Rhaphibelus
  - Winkleriteuthis

== Paleoecology ==
=== Habitat ===
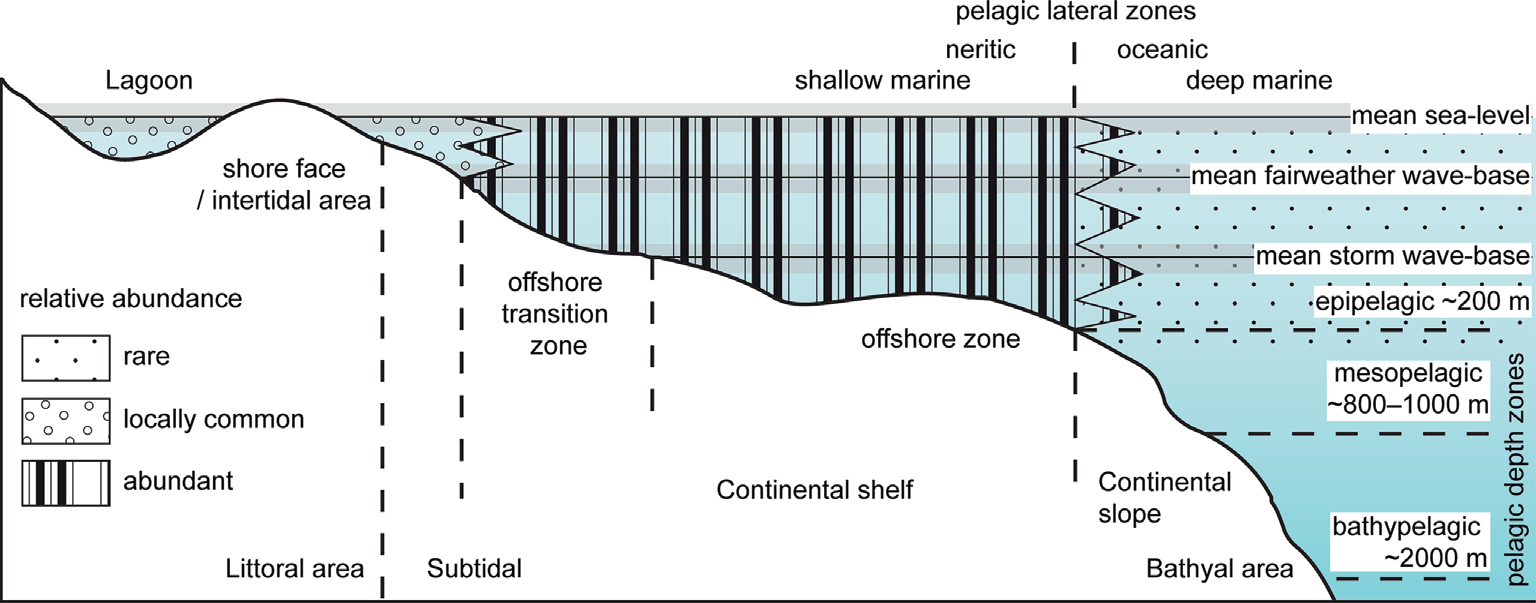
Abundance of belemnites across aquatic settings

Belemnite remains are found in what were littoral (nearshore) and mid-shelf zones. To hunt, they may have quickly or stealthily grabbed prey, maintaining a grip with the hooks, and then dove down to eat. It is traditionally thought they resided on the shelf their entire life, and preyed on crustaceans and other mollusks. Belemnites with slender guards may have been better swimmers than those with more massive guards, with the former having dived into deeper waters and hunted in the open ocean; and the latter restricted to the nearshore and fed from the seafloor. Broadly speaking, they may have preferred temperatures of 12–25 °C (54–77 °F), and, like modern squid, warmer waters may have heightened their metabolism, increasing birth and growth rates, but also decreasing lifespan. It has been suggested that most belemnite species were stenothermic, inhabiting only a narrow range of temperatures, though Neohibolites had a cosmopolitan distribution during the Cretaceous Thermal Maximum, a period of dramatic increase in global temperatures.

=== Mortality ===
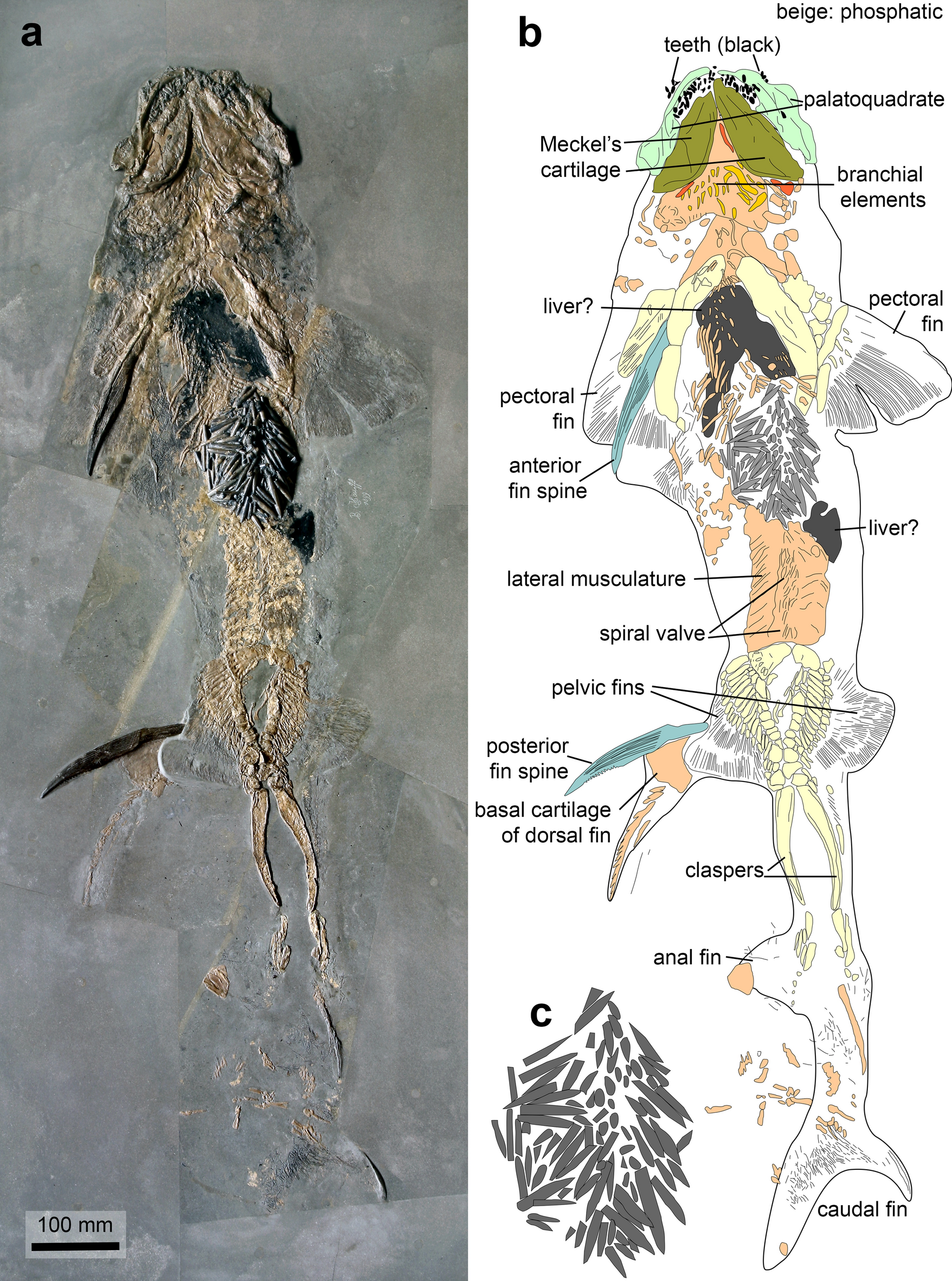
The shark Hybodus with belemnite guards in its stomach

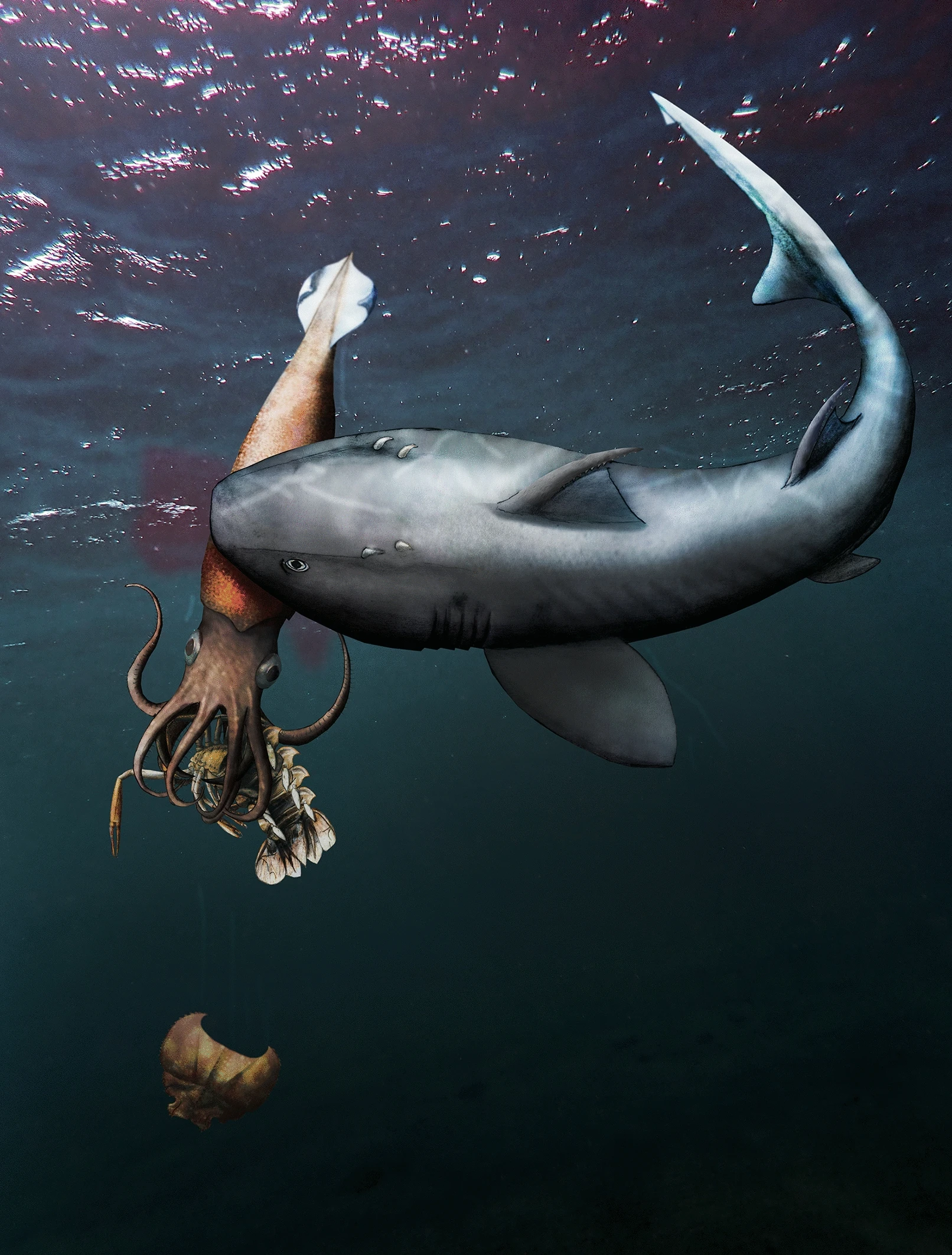
Reconstruction of Passaloteuthis attacked by Hybodus

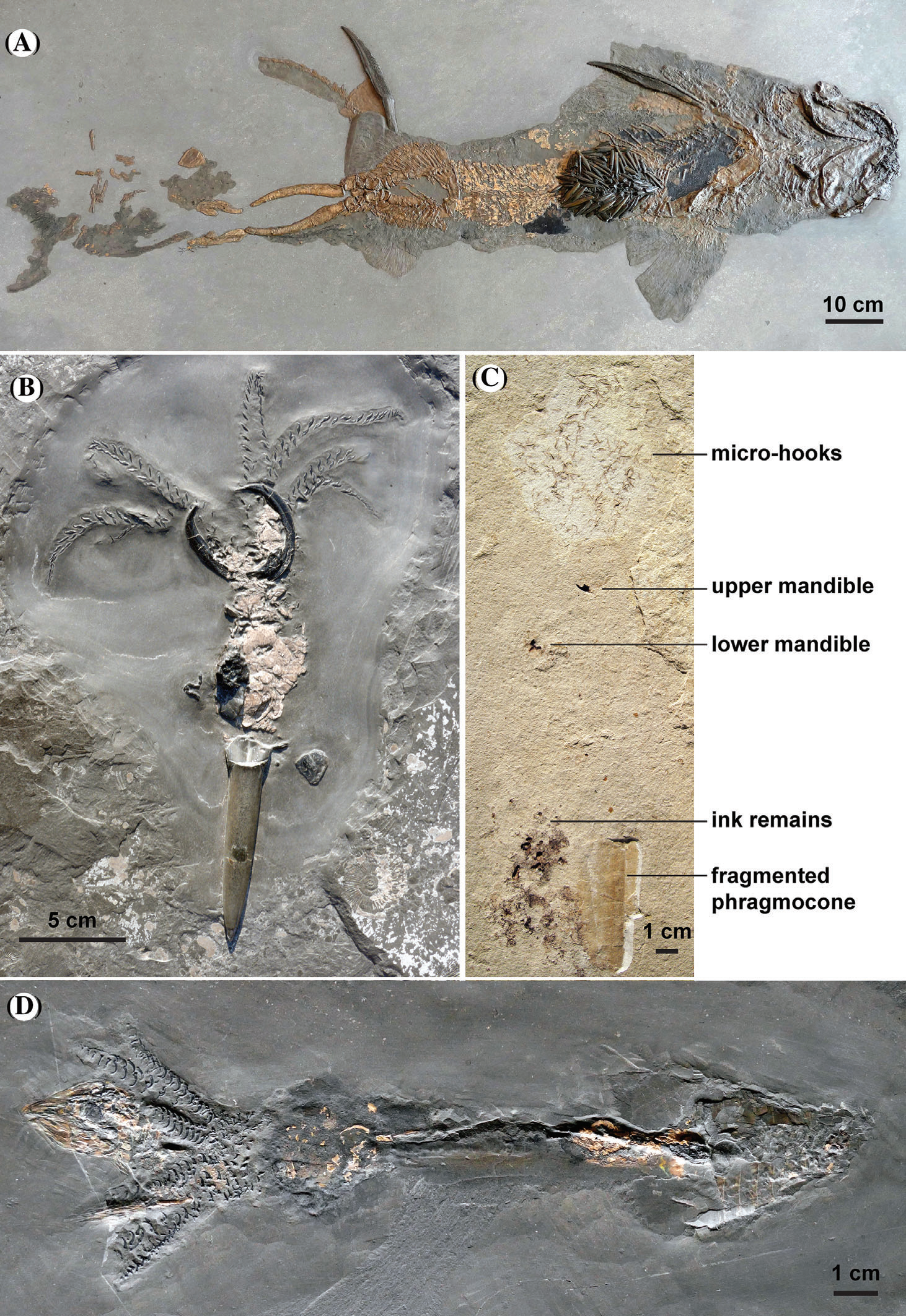
Fossil preservation of paleoecological interactions of belemnites

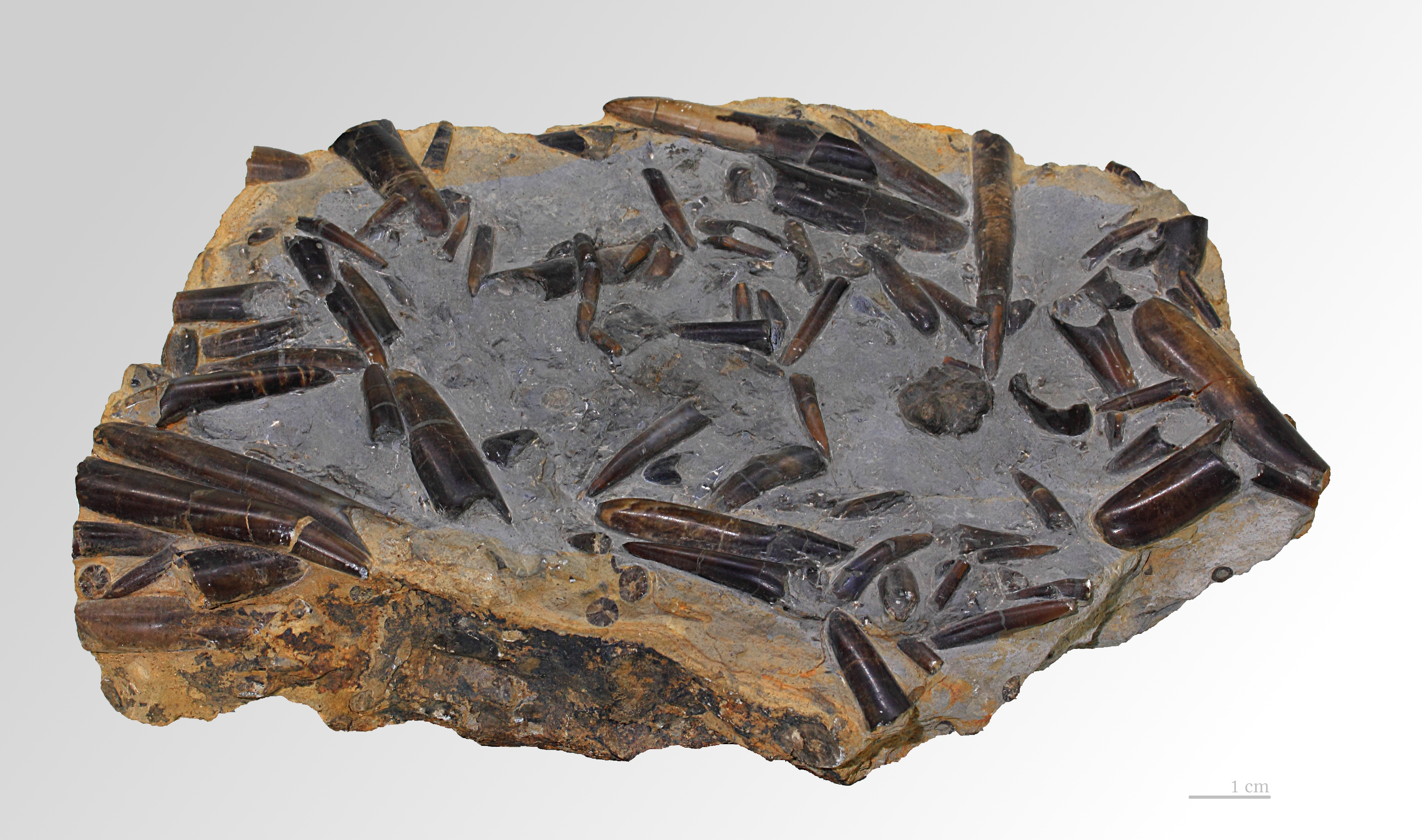
A large mass-mortality aggregation of belemnite guards

Belemnites were likely an abundant and important food source to many sea-going creatures of the Mesozoic. Belemnite hook remains have been found in the stomach contents of crocodilians, plesiosaurs, and ichthyosaurs; and the coprolite remains of ichthyosaurs and the extinct thylacocephalan crustaceans. Some animals may have only eaten the heads, leaving the phragmocone and guards, however, the guards of around 250 Acrocoelites were found in the stomach of a 1.6 m (5 ft 3 in) Hybodus shark, and a fragment in an Oxford Clay marine crocodile, meaning they were eaten whole. It may be that they were to regurgitate the indigestible matter later, similar to the modern sperm whale. To defend themselves, belemnites likely were able to eject a cloud of ink.

The abundant planktonic belemnite larvae, along with planktonic ammonite larvae, likely formed the base of Mesozoic food webs, serving a greater ecological function than the adults. Giant pachycormid fish are thought to have been the main filter feeders of the time, occupying the same niche as modern baleen whales.

Large accumulations of guards are commonly found and have been nicknamed "belemnite battlefields". The most quoted explanation is that belemnites were semelparous and died shortly after spawning, much like modern coleoids which migrate from the ocean to the shelf area. In battlefields comprising both adults and juveniles—as the former model would consist entirely of adults—large groups of belemnites may have been killed by volcanism, changes in salinity or temperature, harmful algal blooms (and, thereby, anoxia), or mass stranding. Another popular theory is that the guards were simply moved or redeposited by ocean currents into large aggregations. Some battlefields may be regurgitated indigestible matter from a predator.

== In culture ==
R22
The symbol of the god Min
in hieroglyphs

Belemnite guards have been known since antiquity, and much folklore surrounding them has evolved since. The symbol of the Egyptian god Min has been described, among others, as two fossil belemnites. Before belemnites were identified as fossils, it was believed the guards were some gemstones, namely lyngurium and amber. After a thunderstorm, guards would sometimes be left exposed in the soil, explained as lightning bolts thrown from the sky. This belief persists in parts of rural Britain. In Germanic folklore, belemnites are known by at least 27 different names, such as Fingerstein ("finger stone"), Teufelsfinger ("Devil's finger"), and Gespensterkerze ("ghostly candle"). In Southern England, the pointy guards were used to cure rheumatism, ground up to cure sore eyes (which only aggravated the problem), and, in Western Scotland, put into water to cure distemper in their horses.

Belemnitella was declared the state fossil of Delaware on 2 July 1996.

== See also ==
- Ammonoidea
- Belemnoidea
- Orthoceratoidea
