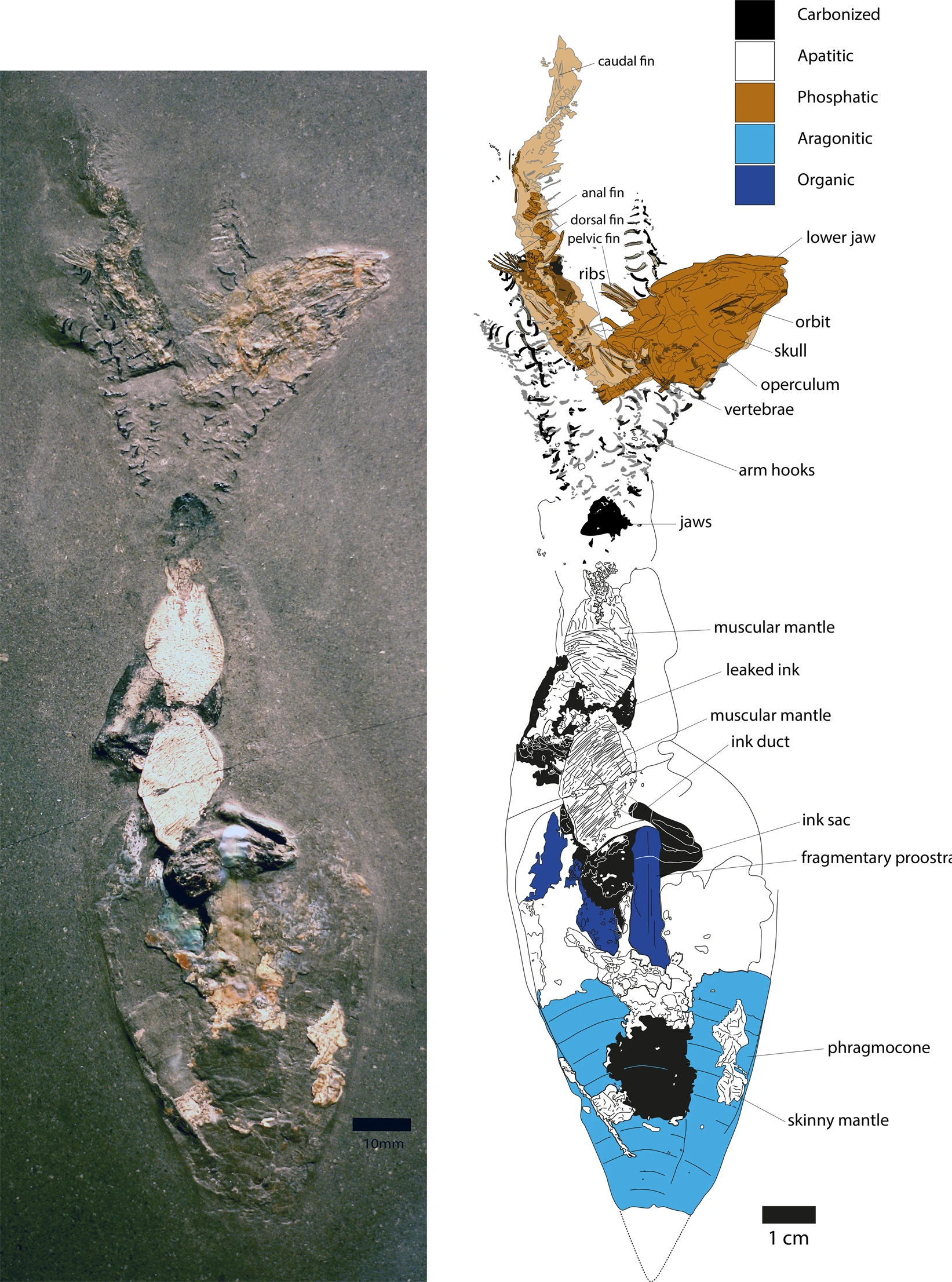
- Fossil of Clarkeiteuthis conocauda preying on Leptolepis

Scientific classification
- Domain: Eukaryota
- Kingdom: Animalia
- Phylum: Mollusca
- Class: Cephalopoda
- Order: †Diplobelida
- Genus: †Clarkeiteuthis; Dirk et al. 2013

Species
- C. conocauda Quenstedt, 1849; C. montefiorei Buckman, 1880

Synonyms
- Synonyms of C. conocauda: Onychoteuthis conocauda Quenstedt, 1849; Acanthoteuthis conocauda (Quenstedt, 1849); Phragmoteuthis conocauda (Quenstedt, 1849); Synonyms of C. montefiorei: Belemnoteuthis montefiorei Buckman, 1880; Acanthoteuthis montefiorei (Buckman, 1880); Phragmoteuthis montefiorei (Buckman, 1880)

= Clarkeiteuthis =

Clarkeiteuthis Temporal range: Hettangian to Toarcian Hettangian–180

Extinct genus of molluscs

Clarkeiteuthis is a genus of extinct belemnoid cephalopod known from the lower Jurassic in Germany and England. Described two species, C. conocauda and C. montefiorei are originally described as species of phragmoteuthid Phragmoteuthis, but got their own genus and moved to Diplobelida.

== Description ==
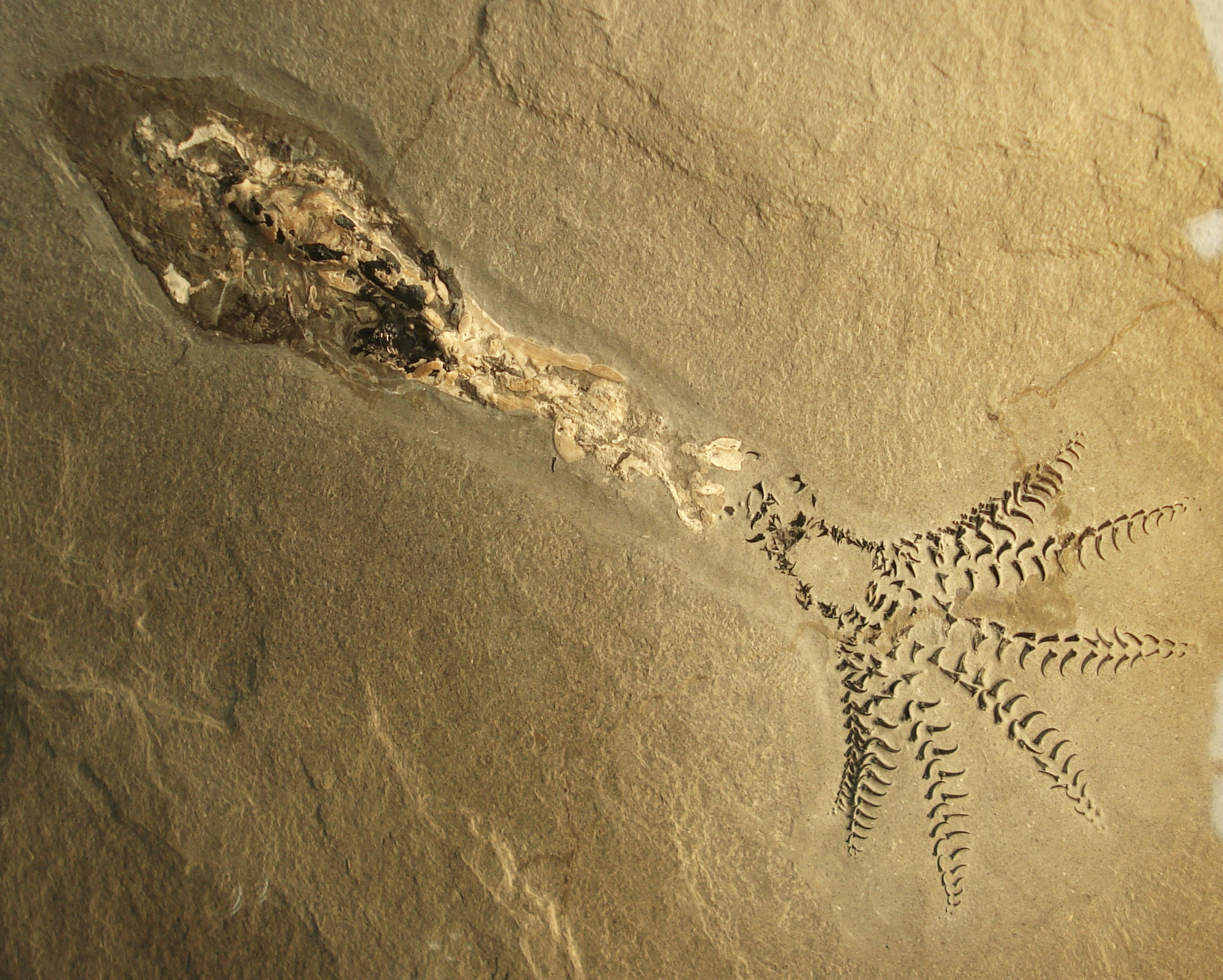
A specimen of C. conocauda

Two species are described, C. conocauda is known from Posidonia Shale, and C. montefiorei is known from the Hettangian strata of the Blue Lias Formation and from Charmouth Mudstone Formation.

Clarkeiteuthis had long phragmocone and ten short, hook-bearing arms. Although it is originally considered as phragmoteuthid, this classification has been discussed by modern researchers, as it lacked a broad three-lobed proostracum (The anterior prolongation of the guard of the phragmocone), the autapomorphy of phragmoteuthid.

C. conocauda had total length about 21 cm (8.3 in). This species is well preserved, soft tissues such as mantle and ink sac are visible. One arm had around 30 hooks.

== Palaeobiology ==
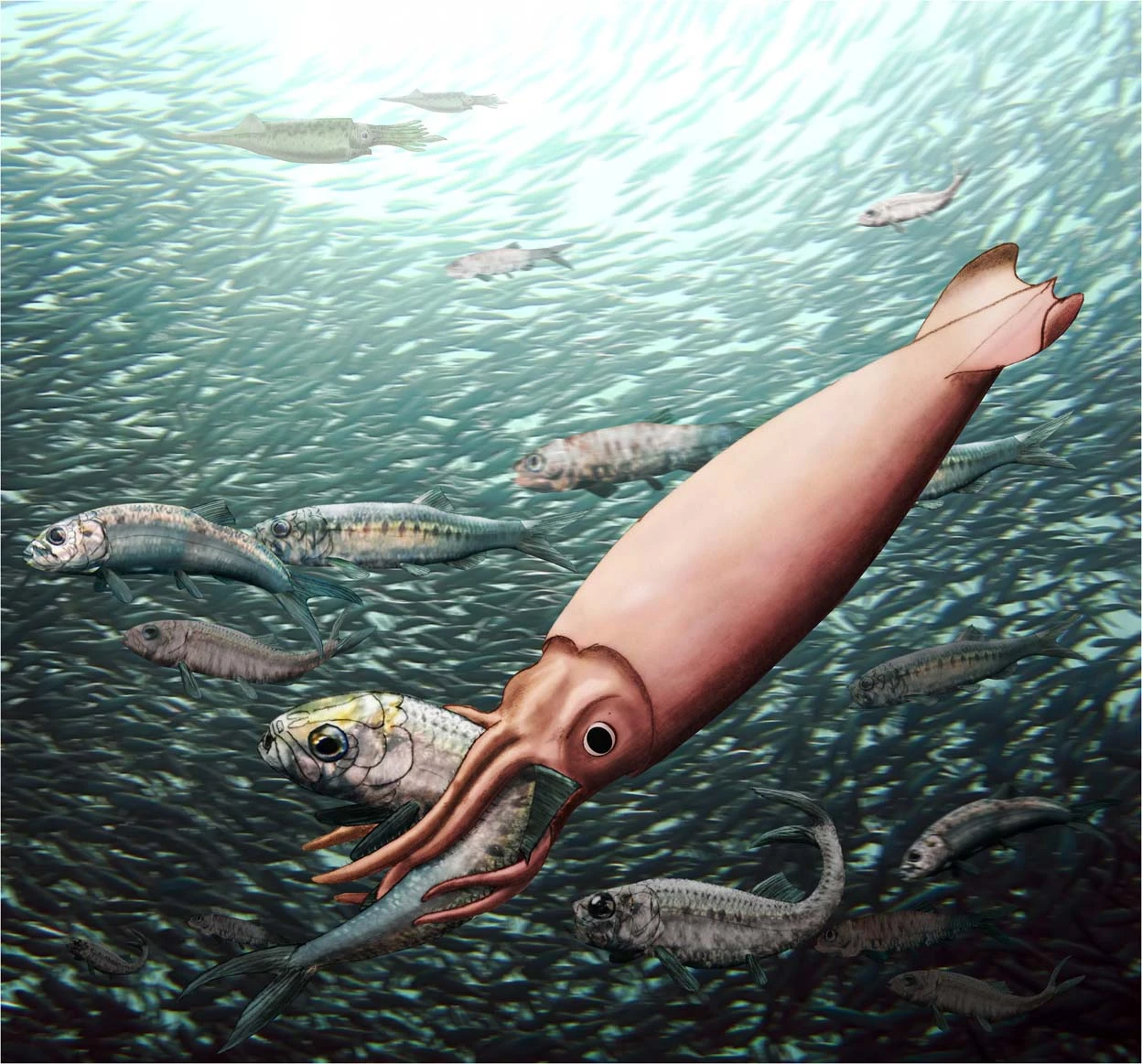
Reconstruction of Clarkeiteuthis preying on Leptolepis

Well-preserved specimens of C. conocauda with Leptolepis bronni (invalid species of Leptolepis) in its arms are known from Posidonia Shale. Preservation of fossil and behavior of living cephalopod suggests that Clarkeiteuthis probably contracted its arms to pull prey towards its mouth to cut the spine by using its beaks, and then feed on it. In all the three specimens of C. conocauda with catching preys had Leptolepis in its arms. Leptolepis is most common fish in the formation, and it lacked thick scales, so it was probably the most common prey of Clarkeiteuthis.

Unlike belemnites which are considered as good swimmers, diplobelids like Clarkeiteuthis were probably less active swimmers, with the capability of occasional short bursts of rapid swimming movements.
