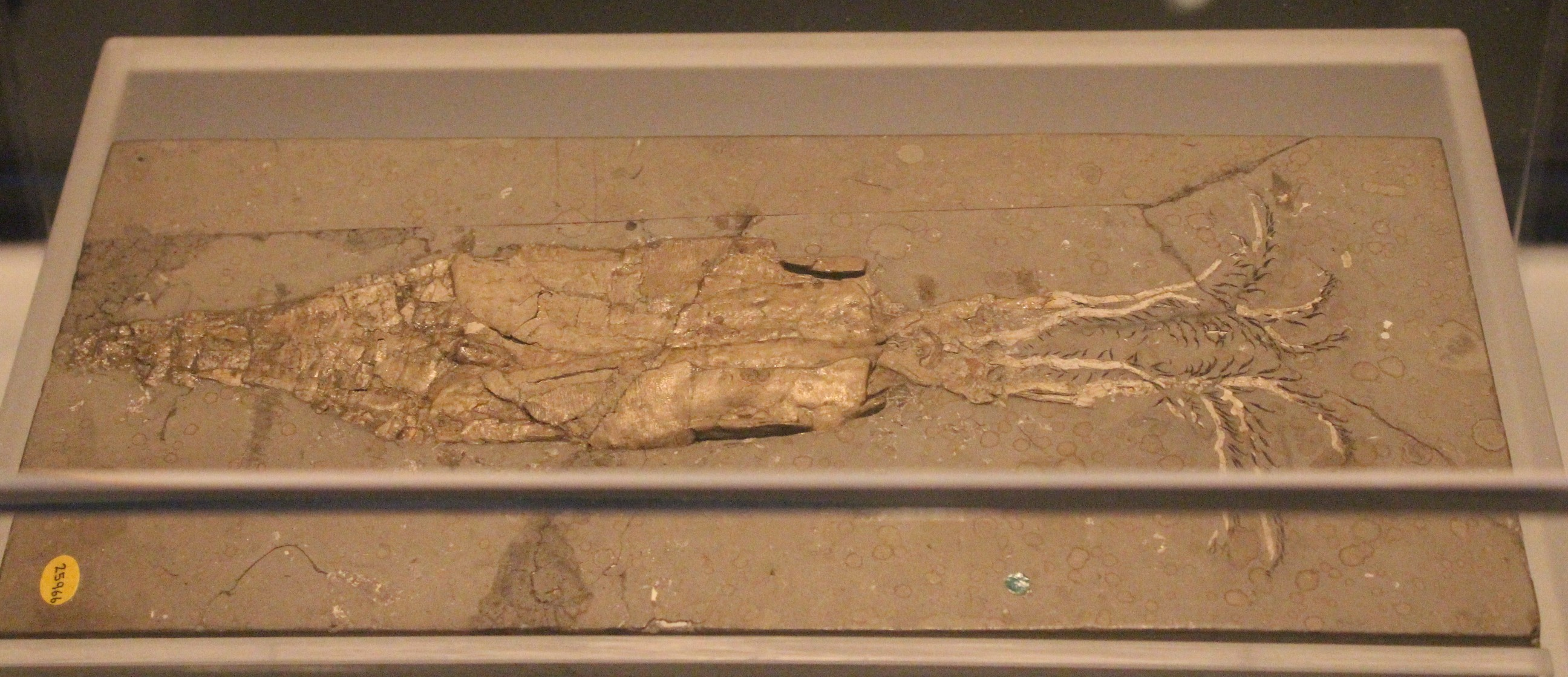
- Belemnotheutis antiquus fossil (NHMUK 25966) showing soft anatomy, Field Museum of Natural History

Scientific classification
- Kingdom: Animalia
- Phylum: Mollusca
- Class: Cephalopoda
- Order: †Belemnitida
- Family: †Belemnotheutidae
- Genus: †Belemnotheutis; Pearce, 1842

Type species
- †Belemnotheutis antiquus Pearce, 1847

Species
- See text

= Belemnotheutis =

Belemnotheutis Temporal range: Middle to Upper Jurassic

Genus of molluscs

Belemnotheutis is an extinct coleoid cephalopod genus from the middle and upper Jurassic, related to but morphologically distinct from belemnites. Belemnotheutis fossils are some of the best preserved among coleoids. Remains of soft tissue are well-documented in some specimens, even down to microscopic muscle tissue. In 2008, a group of paleontologists even recovered viable ink from ink sacs found in several specimens.

This genus was the subject of a dispute between several eminent 19th century British paleontologists, notably between Richard Owen and Gideon Mantell. Some authors incorrectly spell the genus Belemnoteuthis following the usual spelling teuthis (τευθίς) for 'squid'.

== Description ==
The genus Belemnotheutis is characterized by an internal shell consisting of a conical phragmocone covered apically by a thin rostrum, or guard, homologous to the bullet-shaped rostrum of true belemnites, a short forward projecting proostracum, and ten hook bearing arms of equal length.

Belemnotheutis fossils are sometimes found in remarkable states of preservation, some specimens retaining permineralized soft tissue. The mantle, fins, head, arms, and hooks are well-documented from remains preserved in Lagerstätten. One specimen recovered from Christian Malford, Wiltshire and currently displayed in the Paleontology Department of the Natural History Museum in London is fossilized clasping a fish.

Belemnotheutis is not a 'true' belemnite (suborder Belemnitina) but a closely related coleoid. Both belemnotheutids and belemnites resembled modern squids except that they had chambered internal skeletons called phragmocones.

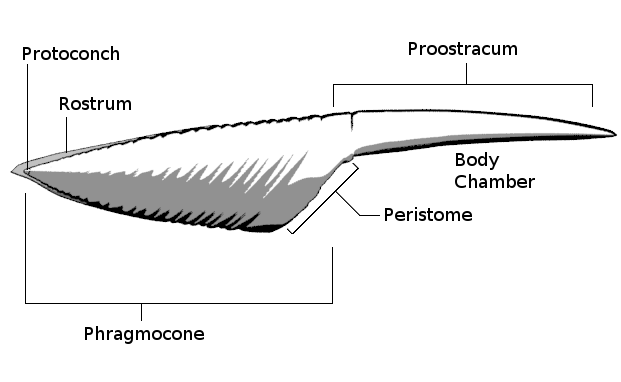
Parts of the internal skeleton of Belemnotheutis (rostrum is cut away in this illustration).

The apical portion of the Belemnotheutis internal skeleton is called the rostrum (plural: rostra) or the guard. The rostrum of Belemnotheutis differs significantly from that of true belemnites. Unlike the bullet-shaped dense guards of belemnites, the rostrum of Belemnotheutis is only present as a very thin sheath. It was also composed of aragonite rather than the heavy calcite of belemnites. In large specimens the rostrum can reach a maximum of only 1 mm (0.039 in) in thickness near the tip. The outer surface was covered by a thin organic layer in the live animal. In true belemnites, the large dense rostra acted as a counterbalance, keeping the animal horizontally oriented when swimming. It was long assumed that Belemnotheutis were confined to shallow waters, unable to venture into deeper waters due to the absence of the heavy rostra. The discovery of cameral deposits in the phragmocones of Belemnotheutis in 1952 made it clear that they were capable of controlling buoyancy.

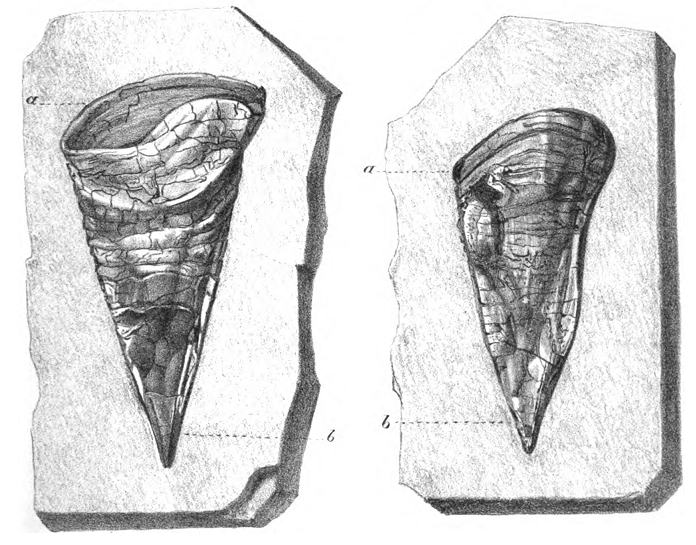
Two drawings of Belemnotheutis phragmocones by Gideon Mantell.

The phragmocone of Belemnotheutis is short and blunt, measuring around 35 mm (1.4 in) to 86 mm (3.4 in) in length. The outer wall of the phragmocone is called the conotheca, distinct from the rostrum. It begins approximately 50 mm (2.0 in) from the tip of the phragmocone and consists of a nacreous outer layer and an inner lamellar layer. The outer layer gradually thins from 0.6 mm (0.024 in) in thickness to only about 0.1 mm (0.0039 in) thick at about 65 mm (2.6 in) further down the shell until it eventually disappears around the opening of the phragmocone (the peristome). Sometimes there is a hollow gap between the rostrum and the lamellar layer of the conotheca, indicating either organic content that have since disappeared or disintegration of the lamellar layer itself. The phragmocone of Belemnotheutis had about 50 chambers that were originally aragonitic, though they are usually replaced by calcium phosphate during the process of fossilization.

At the very tip of the phragmocone beneath the rostrum is an embryonic shell known as the protoconch. In Belemnotheutis, like in other belemnotheutids, the protoconch is roughly cup-shaped and sealed. This was thought to be another method of distinguishing it from other belemnites which usually have ball-shaped protoconchs. However, it is probably a taphonomic artefact, with the protoconch being spherical like other belemnites.

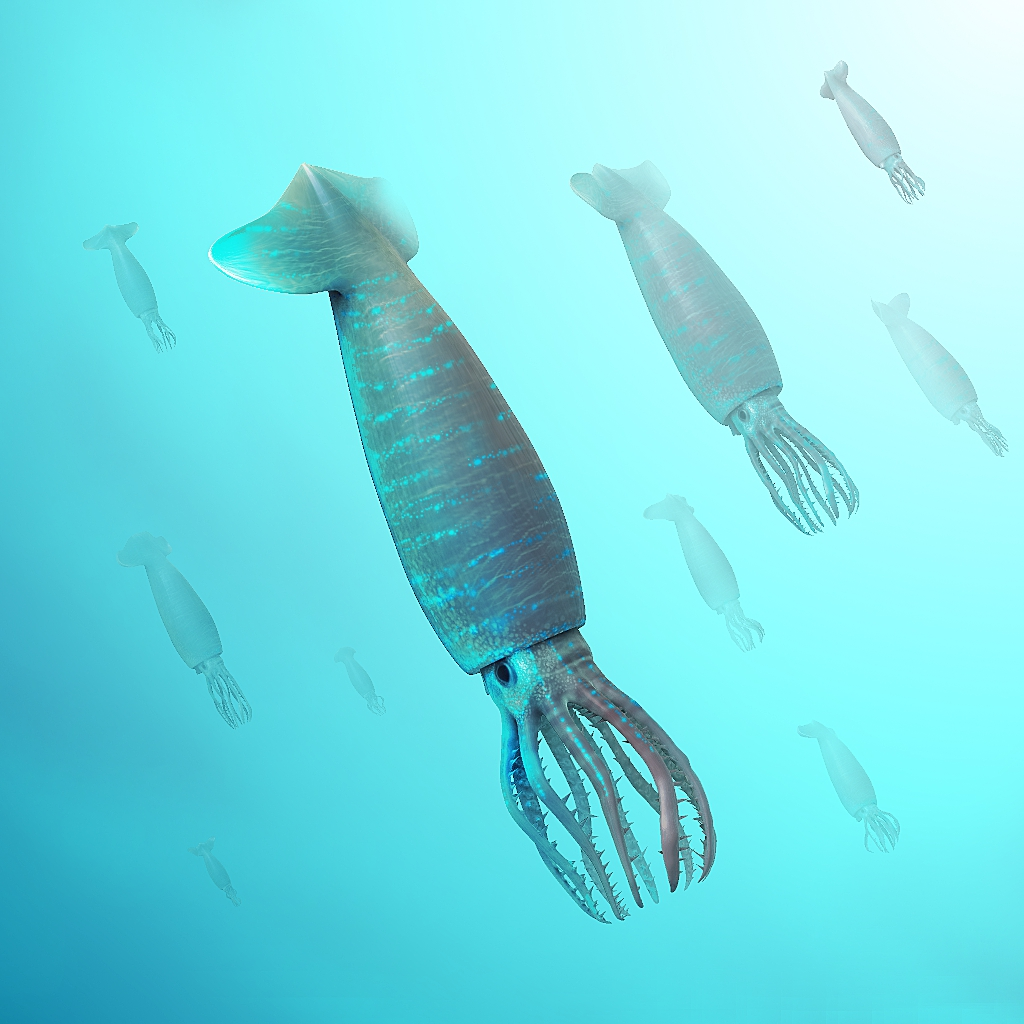
Reconstruction of Belemnotheutis in life

The long, weakly tapering structure in the dorsal anterior part of the internal skeleton is called the proostracum. It is striated longitudinally and often shows minute holes left by boring organisms usually less than 1 μm in diameter. The length of the proostracum is one to two times the length of the phragmocone. The proostracum was a thin, delicate structure substantially narrower than the phragmocone. Its original composition is unknown and it is always found separated from the phragmocone and the rostrum and often crushed. Whether the proostracum was connected to or derived from the phragmocone is still a subject of debate among paleontologists. Its general morphology, however, resembles that of true belemnites rather than those from other 'unusual' belemnoid coeloids with short rostra like Permoteuthis and Phragmoteuthis.

The head is not well preserved in known specimens. It comprised approximately 20% of the body length (excluding the arms). Brain cartilage is observed in some specimens, as well as a pair of aragonitic statoliths which helped the animal determine horizontal orientation when swimming. Belemnotheutis, like most of the other belemnoids, had ten arms of equal length lined with two rows of inward-pointing hooks each. Each of the hooks were composed of several sections. The curved pointed tip is called the uncinus and was probably the only part of the hooks exposed. The rest of the hook (the shaft and the base) were embedded in a sheath of soft tissue below the orbicular scar, a small groove where the tissue attachment terminated. They are also believed to have been stalked and mobile, helping the animal manipulate its prey. Traces of functional suckers have been found and these constitute a single row on each arm, alternating in between the pairs of hooks. The size of the suckers decreases distally along the arms, with the largest (around 2 mm (0.079 in) in diameter) being closest to the head. The length of the arms varies with the size of the individual but may have reached 100 mm (3.9 in) in larger specimens.

Belemnotheutis had a cylindriconical muscular mantle covered by an outer and inner skin (tunic). Traces of a criss-cross pattern composed of collagen fibers have been observed in the surface of some well-preserved fossils. The cross section of the exceptionally preserved body wall of a specimen from the Oxford Clay formations also reveals alternating bands of concentrically and radially oriented body fibers. They imply that Belemnotheutis were powerful swimmers and agile predators, similar to modern shallow-water squid species. The animal reached 10 to 30 cm (3.9 to 11.8 in) in length, including its arms. The body diameter was around 12 to 14% of the mantle length. At the center of the dorsal surface of the rostrum is a narrow V-shaped groove running about 3/5ths the length of the phragmocone from the apex, with two rounded ridges at its left and right sides. These grooves are one of the most distinctive features of the Belemnotheutidae and are theorized to have served as attachments to terminal oval or oar-shaped fins like in some modern squids. The siphuncle is marginal and located ventrally. Directly in front of the phragmocone was an ink sac that could reach 25 mm (0.98 in) long in large specimens. Intestinal casts (cololites) as well as the orientations and positions of fossilized remains reveal that the animal preyed on fish and other coleoids in life. Their great abundance in certain formations indicate that Belemnotheutis were highly gregarious animals, congregating in large monospecific or polyspecific shoals.

== Distribution and geological time range ==
Belemnotheutis existed during the late Middle Jurassic to the Upper Jurassic epoch, from the Callovian age (166.1 to 163.5 mya) to the Kimmeridgian age (157.3 to 152.1 mya). The belemnotheutid Acanthoteuthis, a close relative which is treated by some paleontologists as synonymous with Belemnotheutis, is known to have existed from as early as the Callovian age (166.1 to 163.5 mya) of the Middle Jurassic epoch to as late as the Aptian age (125 to 112 mya) of the Lower Cretaceous epoch. The earliest known possible remains of belemnotheutids (genera Chitinobelus and Chondroteuthis) come from the Lower Jurassic, from phragmocones and rostra recovered from Toarcian formations in Dumbleton, Gloucestershire, and Ilminster, Somerset, England. However, these remains seem to have possessed the typical calcitic rostra of true belemnites rather than the characteristic aragonitic rostra of belemnotheutids.

Belemnotheutis serve as index fossils. They are mostly found in Jurassic formations like the Kimmeridge Clay formation, the Oxford Clay formation, and the Solnhofen Limestone formation. Their geographic range, thus far, is confined to Europe.

== Taxonomy and nomenclature ==
Belemnotheutis are coleoids belonging to the family Belemnotheutidae. Belemnotheutis and other belemnotheutids are considered by some paleontologists to be distinct from true belemnites (suborder Belemnitina). Most authorities like Jeletzky (1966), Bandel and Kulicki (1988), and Peter Doyle (1990) classify it under Belemnitida in the suborder Belemnotheutina (the classification used by this article). Others like Donovan (1977) and Engeser and Reitner (1981) classify it as a distinct order, Belemnotheutida, based on the aragonitic constitution of the rostra, the shape of the proostraca, protoconchs, and the arm crowns, among other morphological factors.

Belemnotheutis has been continually spelled as Belemnoteuthis by authors who believed that Pearce had made an honest mistake in naming the specimens. In 1999, D.T. Donovan and M.D. Crane succeeded in convincing the International Commission on Zoological Nomenclature that the spelling was intentional, citing historical usage of the spelling Greek θευτίς (theutis) as a valid variant of the usual τευθίς (teuthis, 'squid'). Subsequently, the accepted spelling is now formally Belemnotheutis.

== Species ==
The following is a list of species described under the genus Belemnotheutis.

- Belemnotheutis antiquus Pearce, 1842
- Belemnotheutis polonica Makowski, 1952
- Belemnotheutis mayri Engeser & Reitner, 1981

Belemnotheutis montefiorei has been transferred to the genus Phragmoteuthis and B. rosenkrantzi to the genus Groenlandibelus.

== Fossil ink ==
Fossilized ink sacs were first discovered in belemnites in 1826 by Mary Anning a famous British fossil collector and paleontologist, who along with her brother Joseph and a friend and fellow fossil collector Elizabeth Philpot succeeded in recovering the ink, used to illustrate ichthyosaur and pterosaur fossils. The ink recovered from such fossils were also used to draw fossil ichthyosaurs by Henry De la Beche, a friend and supporter of Mary Anning.

In 2008, an excavation team led by the British Geological Survey in Christian Malford recovered fossilized ink sacs from several remarkably preserved remains of Belemnotheutis antiquus in the Oxford Clay that had been previously identified during the 1840s. The specimens were fossilized rapidly in apatite (calcium phosphate) through a process paleontologist Phil Wilby called "The Medusa Effect". By mixing it with ammonia solution, the team was able to return the ink to its liquid form. Bringing to mind the 19th century practices of the aforementioned early paleontologists, they used the ~150 million year old ink to draw a replica of the original illustration of Belemnotheutis as drawn by Joseph Pearce. Dr. Wilby called the drawing "the ultimate self-portrait".

== History and controversy ==
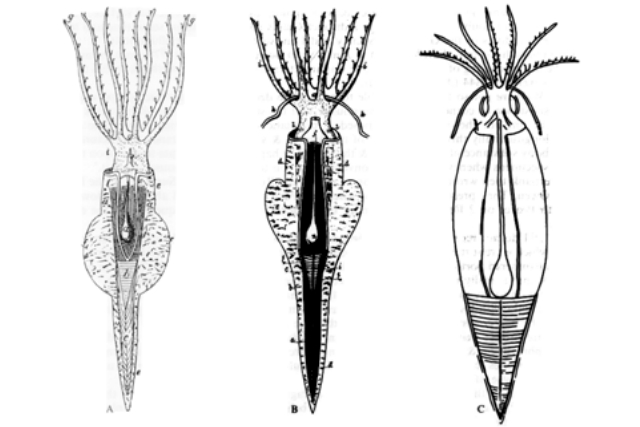
Left and Center: erroneous reconstructions by Richard Owen. Right: a restoration by Joseph Pearce, the original discoverer of Belemnotheutis. It is also the illustration copied in 2008 using ~150 million year old ink recovered from the fossilized ink sac of Belemnotheutis antiquus.

Belemnotheutis was first described by the amateur paleontologist Joseph Pearce in 1842 in Wiltshire, South West England, two years after excavations from the construction of the Great Western Railway uncovered parts of the Oxford Clay. It is unknown why he chose the spelling Belemnotheutis rather than Belemnoteuthis as convention would have dictated. He described his discovery to the Geological Society of London in the same year.

In 1843, Richard Owen acquired specimens of Belemnotheutis from the same locality from another paleontologist, Samuel Pratt. He formally published a paper in 1844 (On the Belemnites, Philosophical Transactions of the Royal Society), naming the specimens Belemnites owenii Pratt, after himself and crediting Pratt with the discovery while failing to mention Pearce. He believed that the specimens were of the genus Belemnites whose typically lengthy rostra simply got separated. He sent a copy of the paper to Pearce in the same year, proving that he was actually aware of Pearce's earlier description but had deliberately omitted any mention of him. Pearce responded by stating that examination by another paleontologist James Bowerbank, supported his belief that fossils did not possess the bullet-shaped guards typical of Belemnites but instead had rostra in the form of very thin sheaths. Bowerbanks confirmed this assertion but supported Owen's assignment of Belemnites, saying that the presence of very short rostra did not justify the classification of Belemnotheutis as a separate genus from Belemnites.

Owen received a Royal Medal from the Royal Society in 1846 for the 1844 paper, further inducing Pearce to protest what he viewed as erroneous descriptions of the specimens. In 1847, the London Geological Journal published a paper by Pearce of his objections to Owen's paper. At the same time the editor of the paper and another paleontologist, Edward Charlesworth, published an editorial criticizing Owen for deliberately failing to credit Pearce with the discovery of Belemnotheutis, as well as his apparent disregard to the opinions of less well-known paleontologists like Pearce. This was also the first time that Pearce described the specific epithet antiquus to the fossils. Pearce died later in the same year in May 1847 taking no further part in what was to become a controversy. Shortly after his death, the same paper published the support of William Cunnington, a fossil collector, for this description as opposed to Owen's conclusions.

In 1848, Gideon Mantell read a description of Belemnotheutis specimens recovered by his son Reginald Neville Mantell to the Royal Society. His descriptions supported that of Pearce's views and held that the differences between belemnites and Belemnotheutis were enough to justify it being a separate genus. He also described the characteristic groove on the apical dorsal surface of the Belemnotheutis for the first time (structures which Owen had attributed as artifacts of crushing). He had expected Owen, who was present during the session, to support this amendment. Instead, Owen ridiculed Mantell, further aggravating the famous feud between the two.

Mantell continued to assert his position until his death in 1852, gaining supporters in other eminent paleontologists like Edward Forbes and Charles Lyell against Owen with regards to the true morphology of Belemnotheutis. By then the hostility between Owen and Mantell had escalated, Owen going so far as to oppose the awarding of the Royal Medal to Mantell for his work in 1849. Mantell did eventually receive the Royal Medal for his work on Iguanodon to which Owen had attempted to claim another authority much in the same way that he had named Belemnotheutis after himself.

In 1860, three years after Mantell's death, Owen eventually published an amendment to his earlier descriptions. He acknowledged that Belemnotheutis indeed had very thin rostra and was distinct from the genus Belemnites. He did so only after other prominent authorities described the very similar Acanthoteuthis and were considering Belemnotheutis as its synonym. However, he never recanted his earlier criticism of both Pearce and Mantell.
