= Shimanskya =

Shimanskya Temporal range: Gzhelian

Scientific classification
- Domain: Eukaryota
- Kingdom: Animalia
- Phylum: Mollusca
- Class: Cephalopoda
- Order: Spirulida (?)
- Family: †Shimanskyidae; Doguzhaeva, Mapes & Mutvei, 1999
- Genus: †Shimanskya; Doguzhaeva, Mapes & Mutvei, 1999
- Species: †S. postremus

Binomial name
- †Shimanskya postremus (Miller, 1930)

Synonyms
- Bactrites postremus Miller, 1930

Genus of molluscs

Shimanskya is a late Carboniferous fossil tentatively interpreted as an early spirulid.

This identification was based on:

the well-developed phragmocone [which] possesses comparatively long camerae and [a] comparatively wide marginal siphuncle, the [absence of the] rostrum (at adult stages at least), and the [construction of the] shell wall, which is as thin as septa, has no nacreous layer and is subdivided into the inner and outer plates

— Doguzhaeva et al. 1999

Doguzhaeva et al. also identify these features in living Spirula, and the fossil 'Spirulida' Naefia, Groenlandibelus and Adygeya—though see these respective articles for discussion as to whether or not these extinct genera are themselves Spiruliids.

Some authors are happy to accept this designation.

But others have argued that none of the characters observed in Shimanskya is clearly diagnostic of the Spirulids.

For example, a nacreous layer may have been lost more than once in cephalopod evolution.

Others view the microstructural evidence as ambiguous.

Interpreting Shimanskya as a spirulid creates a large gap in the fossil record of the lineage. Moreover, some molecular clock results predict that spirulids evolved much later than the Carboniferous, leading some to suggest that Shimanskya ought to be assigned to the coleoid stem group. Other clock analyses, however, are consistent with its position in the spirulid lineage.
