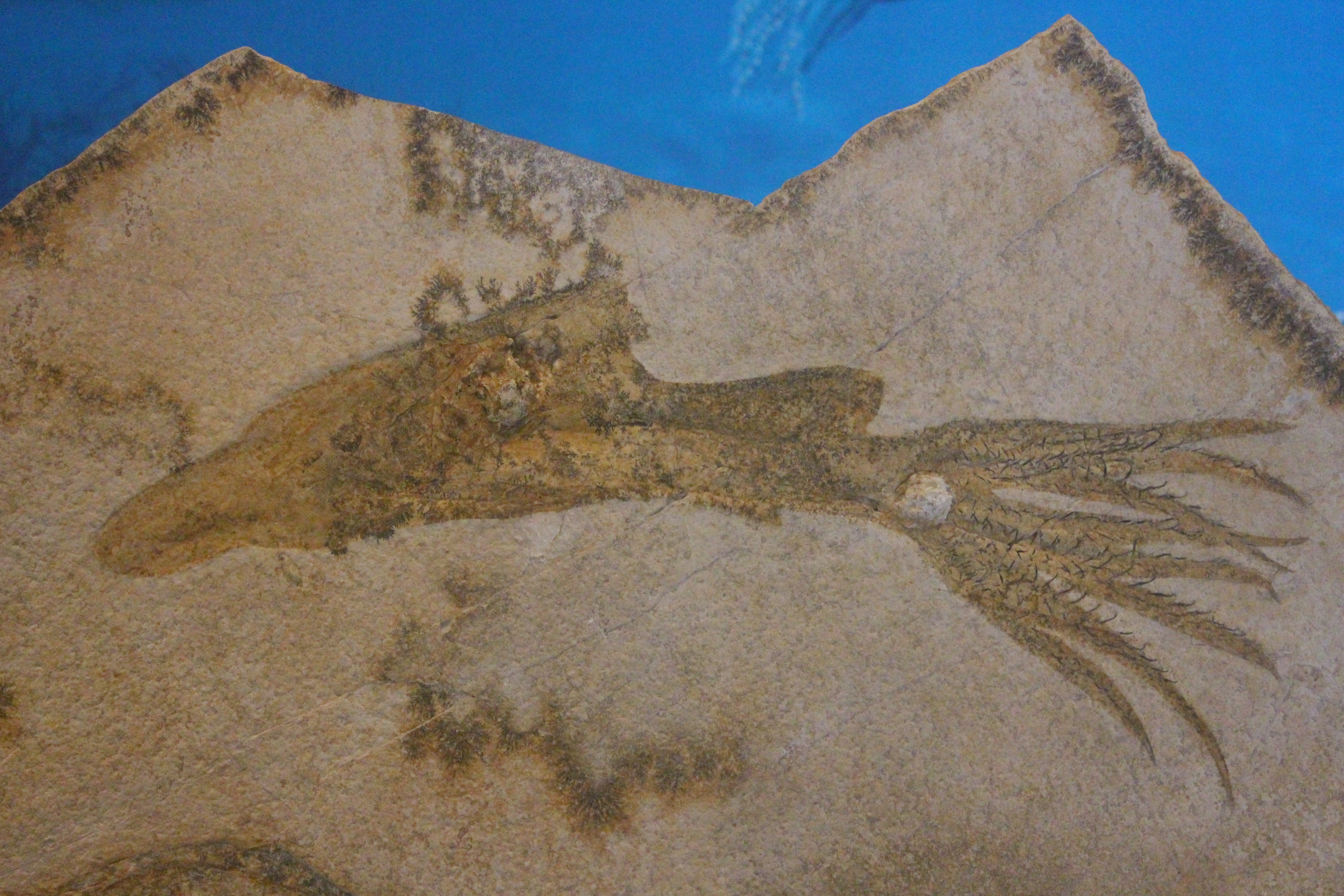
- Fossil specimen, National Museum of Natural History

Scientific classification
- Domain: Eukaryota
- Kingdom: Animalia
- Phylum: Mollusca
- Class: Cephalopoda
- Order: †Belemnitida
- Family: †Belemnotheutidae
- Genus: †Acanthoteuthis; Wagner in Münster, 1839

= Acanthoteuthis =

Acanthoteuthis Temporal range: Lower Tithonian

Extinct genus of molluscs

Acanthoteuthis is a belemnite genus, a squid-like cephalopod with an internal shell from the Late Jurassic Epoch, related to modern coleoids.

Acanthoteuthis belongs to the belemnoid family Belemnotheutidae in which the pointed rostrum at the back of the phragmocone is lacking.

== Taxonomy ==
The genus Acanthoteuthis was founded by R. Wagner and G. Munster for belemnoids, found in the Solnhofen limestone of Bavaria, which have small hooklets on their arms, sometimes associated with more or less complete remains of the animal. The hooklets are typically compressed and may be beveled on either or both margins on one side.

Munster characterized three species, A. speciosa, A. ferussacii, and A. lichtensteinii, chiefly upon the forms of these hooklets. In A lichtensteinii they are smaller than in A speciosa and more circular in transverse section. D'Orbigny united the three under the name A. ferussacii while Wagner regarded A. speciosa as a valid species but saw no essential difference between Munster's A. ferussacii and A. lichtensteinii so united the two under the name A. ferussacii.

== Characteristics ==
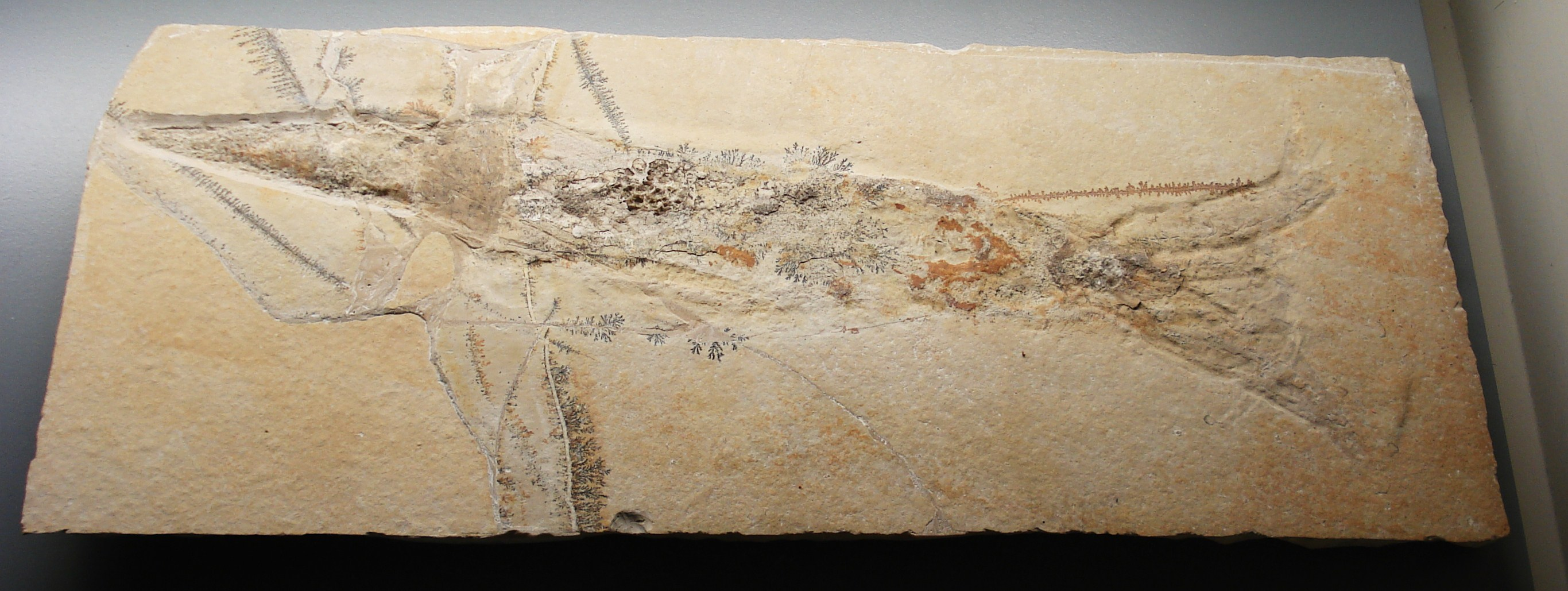
Acanthoteuthis speciosa

C. G. Crick (1898) described an Acanthoteuthis, A ferussachi with four pairs of arms, all eight of which have two rows of hooklets. The arms are of unequal length, the longest pair being almost 85 mm long, probably with 14 or 15 hooklets per row. The shortest arms are 32 mm long with another pair with a length of 38 mm, all four having 9 or 10 hooklets per row. The fourth pair are about 55 mm long with 12 or 13 hooklets per row. The pairs are in no particular physiological order other than that they are assumed to be bilaterally symmetrical. Other references, e.g. Catalogue of the Mollusca in the collection of the British museum, describe Acanthoteuthis as having ten, rather unequal arms, with two rows of hooks. The fifth pair seem to be auxiliary and are comparatively short.

Acanthoteuthis has a distinctive V-shaped ridge on the dorsal side at the back of its internal shell which seems to be analogous to the median keel in the posterior part of the gladius in most recent squids to which the fins are attached. This indicates that Acanthoteuthis also had fins with similar attachment at the posterior end of the animal, and which may have been broadly oval or rhombohedral. The proostracum in front is flat, of considerable width and not likely to have been covered by muscular mantle, which was probably attached to the lateral edges as in recent Vampyroteuthis.

== Paleoecology and lifestyle ==
The absence of a counterbalancing rostrum indicates that Acanthoteuthis lived head down in a vertical orientation, like Spirula and Mastigoteuthis. and the presence of an ink sac indicates it inhabited the upper 200 m of oceanic waters.

Acanthoteuthis and other belemnotheutids were thought to have been planktonic forms that inhabited the epipelagic and possibly upper mesopelagic zones over the continental shelves and slopes of Mesozoic continental seas.

== See also ==
- Belemnite
- List of belemnites
- Belemnotheutis
