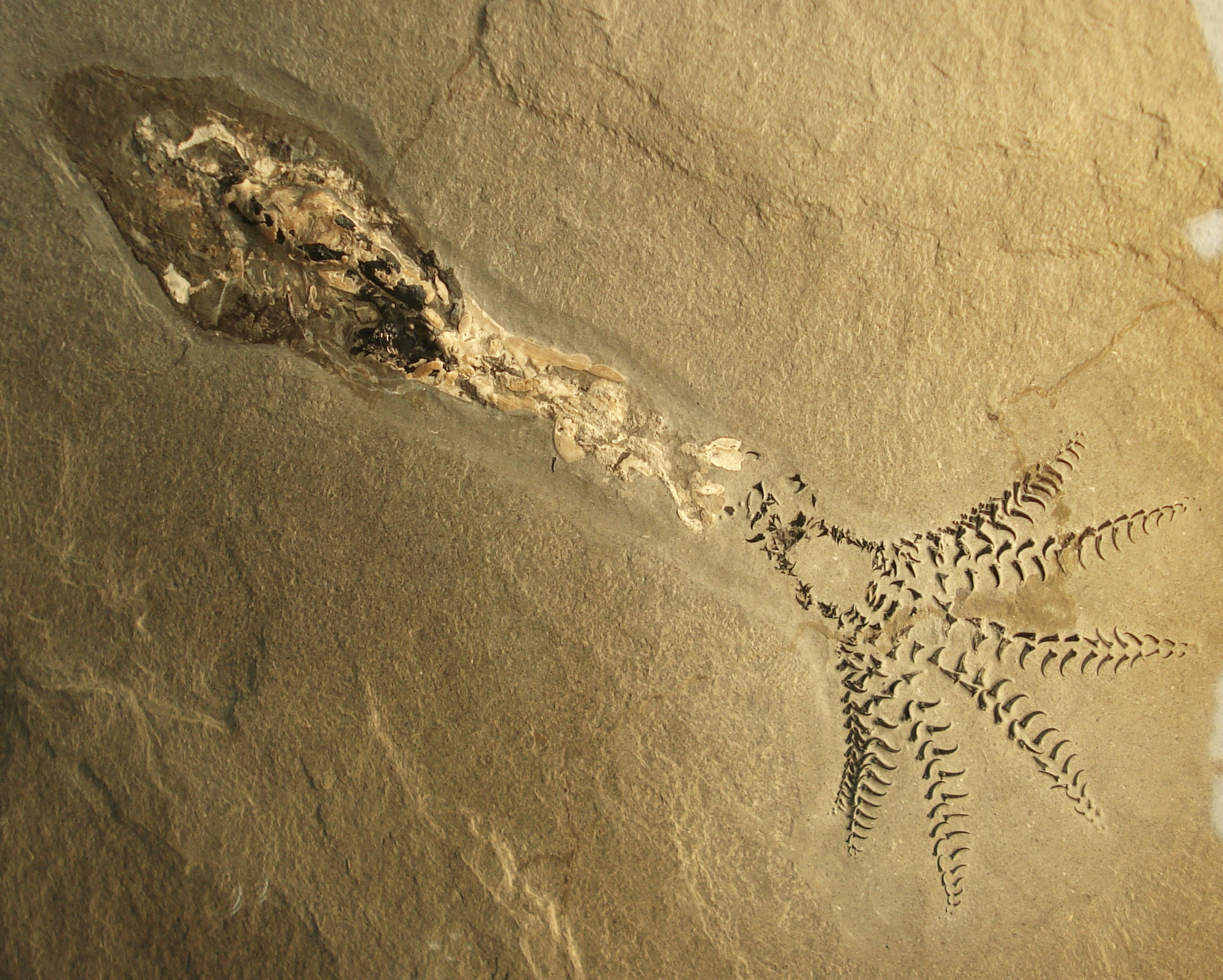
- Well preserved diplobelid Clarkeiteuthis conocauda, showing arm hooks and outline of mantle

Scientific classification
- Kingdom: Animalia
- Phylum: Mollusca
- Class: Cephalopoda
- Subclass: Coleoidea
- Superorder: †Belemnoidea

Orders
- Aulacocerida; Phragmoteuthida; Belemnitida; Diplobelida

= Belemnoidea =

Belemnoids Temporal range: Devonian–Cretaceous

Extinct group of squid-like animals

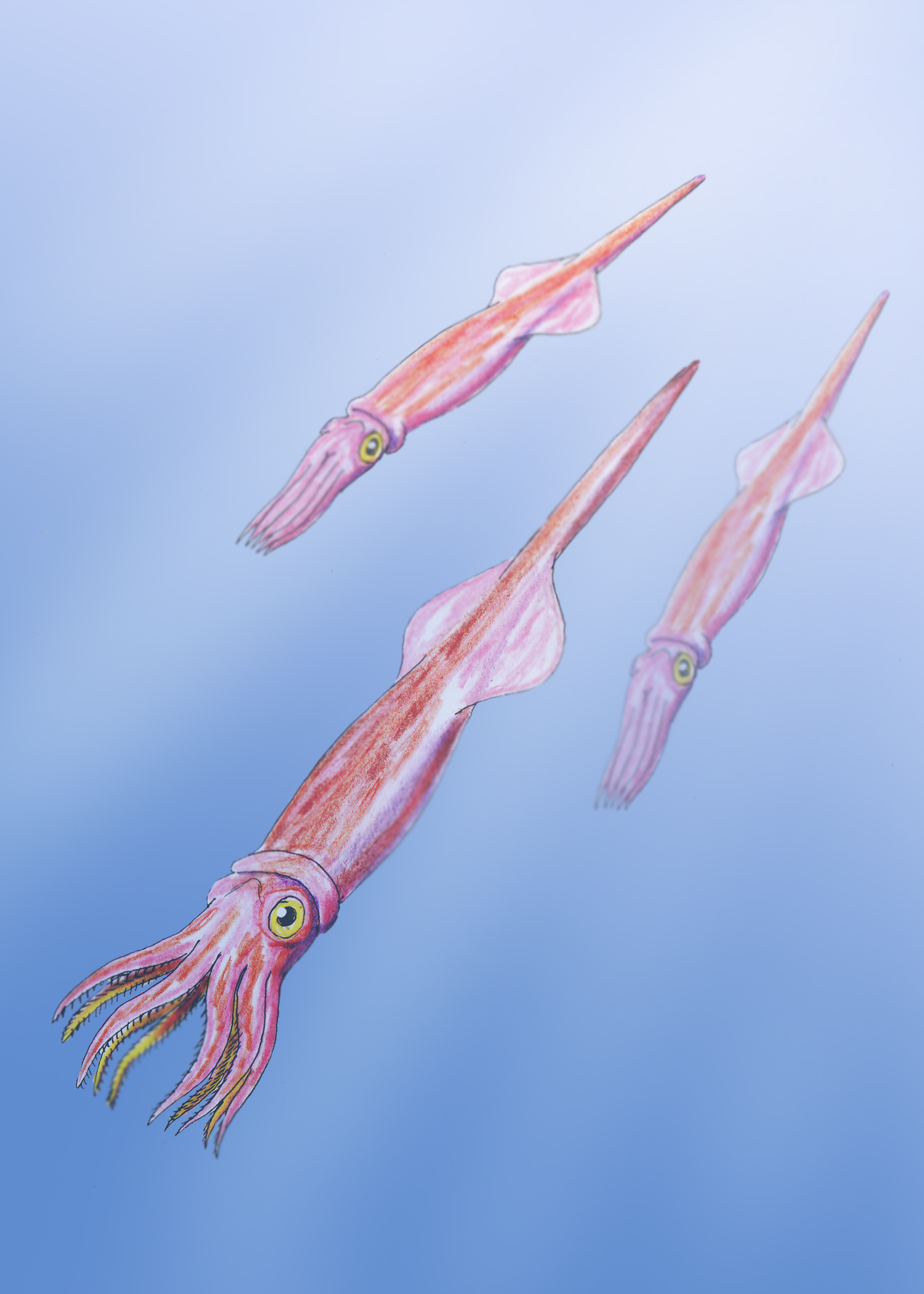
Artist's reconstruction of belemnoids.

Belemnoids are an extinct group of marine cephalopod, very similar in many ways to the modern squid. Like them, the belemnoids possessed an ink sac, but, unlike the squid, they possessed ten arms of roughly equal length, and no tentacles. The name "belemnoid" comes from the Ancient Greek word βέλεμνον (bélemnon), meaning "dart, arrow", and είδος (eídos), meaning "form".

Belemnoids include belemnites (which belong to the order Belemnitida), aulacocerids (order Aulacocerida), phragmoteuthids (order Phragmoteuthida), and diplobelids (order Diplobelida). Belemnoidea has been suggested to be paraphyletic by some authors.

== Occurrence ==
Belemnoids were numerous during the Jurassic and Cretaceous periods, and their fossils are abundant in Mesozoic marine rocks, often accompanying their cousins the ammonites. The belemnoids become extinct at the end of the Cretaceous period along with the ammonites. The belemnoids' origin lies within the bactritoid nautiloids, which date from the Devonian period; well-formed belemnoid guards can be found in rocks dating from the Mississippian (or Early Carboniferous) onward through the Cretaceous. Other fossil cephalopods include baculites, nautiloids and goniatites.

== Anatomy ==
Belemnoids possessed a central rostrum/guard made of aragonite and with negative buoyancy. To the rear of the creature was a heavy calcite guard whose main role appears to have been to counterbalance the front (towards the head) of the organism; it positions the centre of mass below the centre of buoyancy, increasing the stability of the swimming organism. The guard would account for between a third and a fifth of the length of the complete organism, arms included.

Like some modern squid, belemnoid arms carried a series of small hooks for grabbing prey. Belemnoids were efficient carnivores that caught small fish and other marine animals with their arms and ate them with their beak-like jaws. In turn, belemnites appear to have formed part of the diet of marine reptiles such as Ichthyosaurs, whose fossilized stomachs frequently contain phosphatic hooks from the arms of cephalopods.

== Ecology ==
Belemnoids were effectively neutrally buoyant, and swam in near-shore to mid-shelf oceans. Their fins could be used to their advantage in all water speeds; in a gentle current they could be flapped for propulsion; in a stronger current they could be held erect to generate lift; and when swimming rapidly by jet propulsion they could be tucked in to the body for streamlining.

== Preservation ==
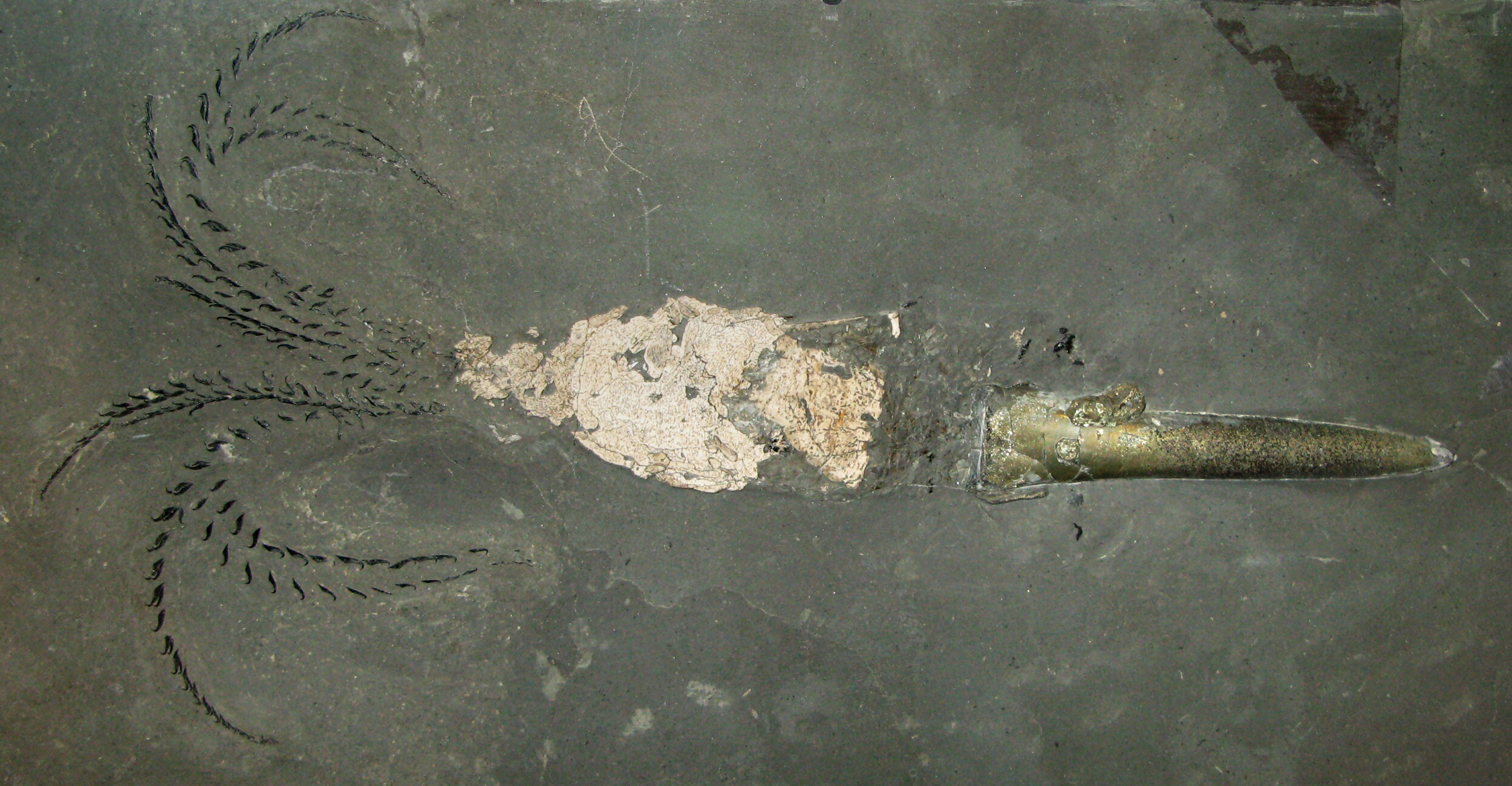
A belemnoid fossil with preserved guard, mantle remnants, and arm hooks

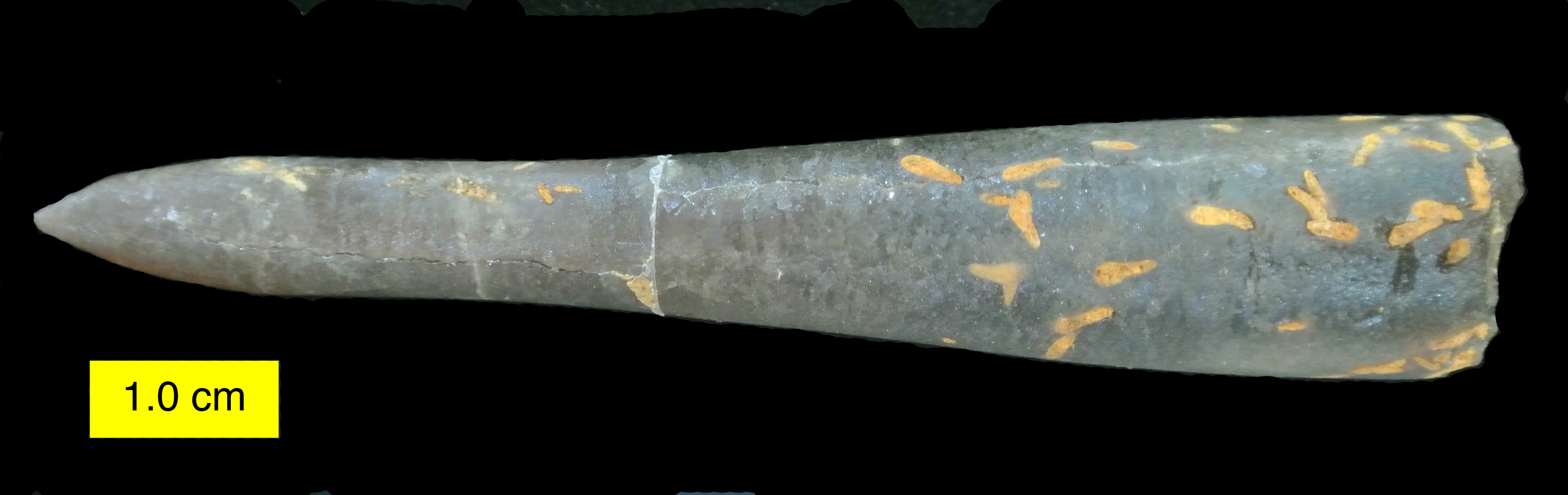
Guard of Hibolites hastatus from the Jurassic near Moneva Teruel, Spain. The barnacle borings (Rogerella) show that it spent considerable time on the seafloor after death.

Normally with fossil belemnoids only the back part of the shell (called the guard or rostrum) is found. The guard is usually elongated and bullet-shaped (though in some subgroups the rostrum may only exist as a thin layer coating the phragmocone). The hollow region at the front of the guard is termed the alveolus, and this houses a chambered conical-shaped part of the shell (called the phragmocone). The phragmocone is usually only found with the better preserved specimens. Projecting forwards from one side of the phragmocone is the thin pro-ostracum.

While belemnoid phragmocones are homologous with the shells of other cephalopods and are similarly composed of aragonite, belemnoid guards are evolutionarily novel and are composed of calcite or aragonite, thus tending to preserve well. Broken guards show a structure of radiating calcite fibers and may also display concentric growth rings.

Diagenetic modifications of the shells are complex. Radiating calcitic crystals are thin, or very large, with a shape indicative of a strong alteration. In other samples, the aragonite - calcite boundary is not dependent on growth lines. In a given fossil sites, some specimens are calcite, others are aragonite.

The guard, phragmocone and pro-ostracum were all internal to the living creature, forming a skeleton which was enclosed entirely by soft muscular tissue. The original living creature would have been larger than the fossilized shell, with a long streamlined body and prominent eyes. The guard would have been in place toward the rear of the creature, with the phragmocone behind the head and the pointed end of the guard facing backward.

The guard of the belemnoid Megateuthis gigantea, which is found in Europe and Asia, can measure up to 46 centimetres (18 in) in length, giving the living animal an estimated length of 3 metres (10 ft).

Very exceptional belemnoid specimens have been found showing the preserved soft parts of the animal. Elsewhere in the fossil record, bullet-shaped belemnite guards are locally found in such profusion that such deposits are referred to semi-formally as "belemnite battlefields" (cf. "orthocone orgies"). It remains unclear whether these deposits represent post-mating mass death events, as are common among modern cephalopods and other semelparous creatures.

=== Thunderstones ===
The name "thunderbolt" or "thunderstone" has also been traditionally applied to the fossilised rostra of belemnoids. The origin of these bullet-shaped stones was not understood, and thus a mythological explanation of stones created where lightning struck has arisen.

== Uses ==
The stable isotope composition of a belemnoid rostrum from the Peedee Formation (Cretaceous, southeast USA) has long been used as a global standard (Peedee Belemnite, "PDB") against which other isotope geochemistry samples are measured, for both carbon isotopes and oxygen isotopes.

Some belemnoids (such as Belemnites of Belemnitida) serve as index fossils, particularly in the Cretaceous Chalk Formation of Europe, enabling geologists to date the age of the rocks in which they are found.

== Classification ==
Note: all families extinct

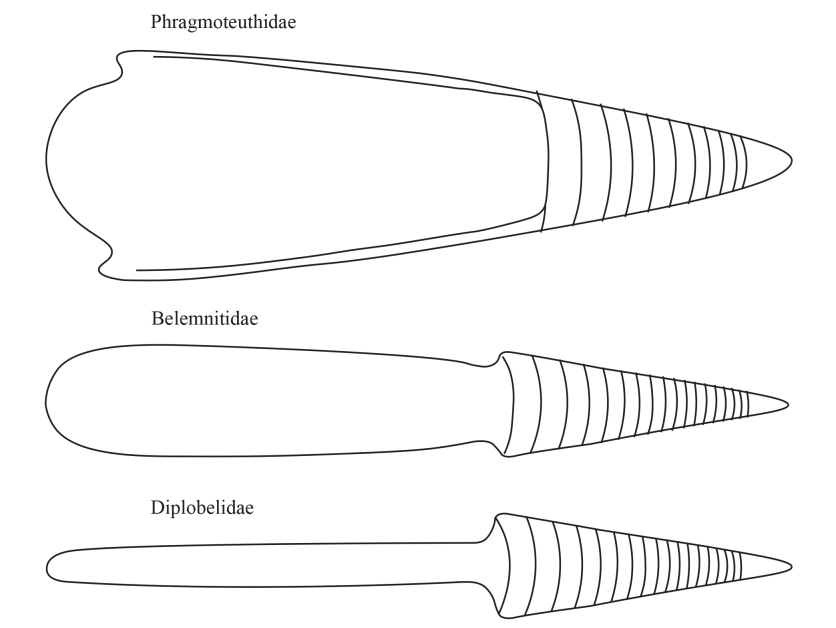
Comparation of hard parts of Phragmoteuthida, Belemnitida and Diplobelida.

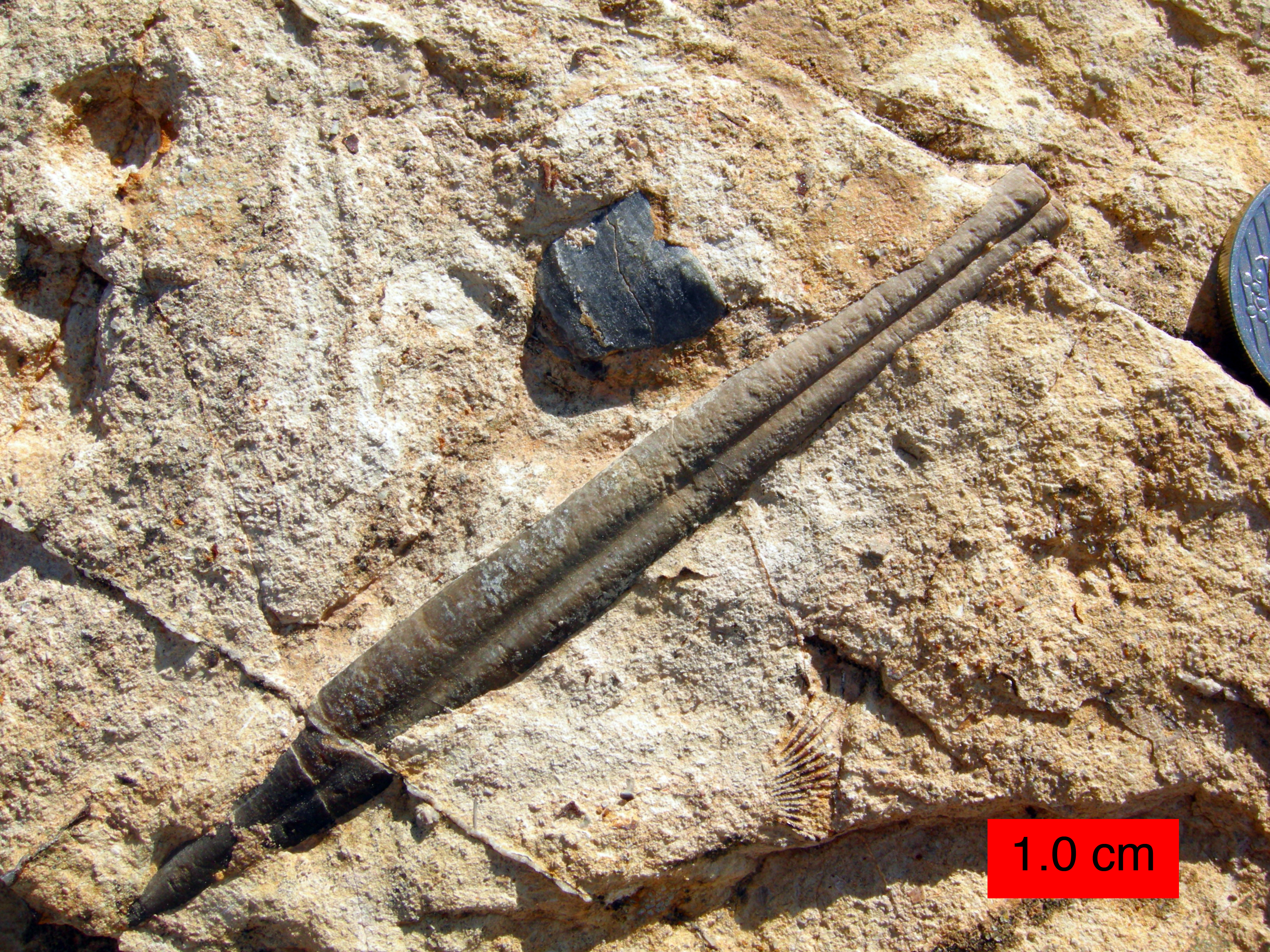
Belemnoid from the very top bedding plane of the Zohar Formation (Jurassic) near Neve Atif, the Golan. The central fold along the axis is characteristic of some genera.

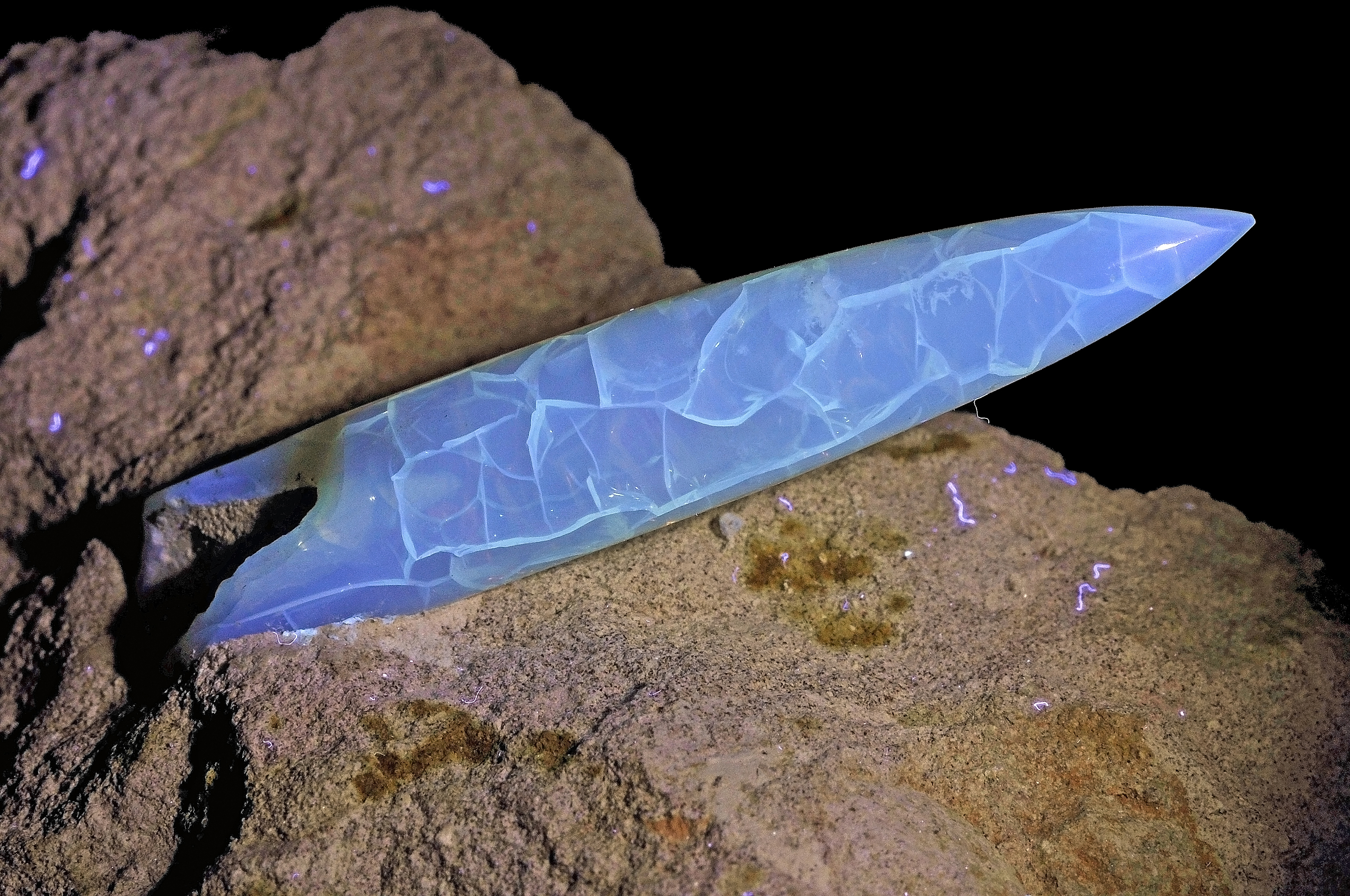
Opalized belemnite rostrum under UV illumination, from Cairn Hill mine, Coober Pedy, South Australia

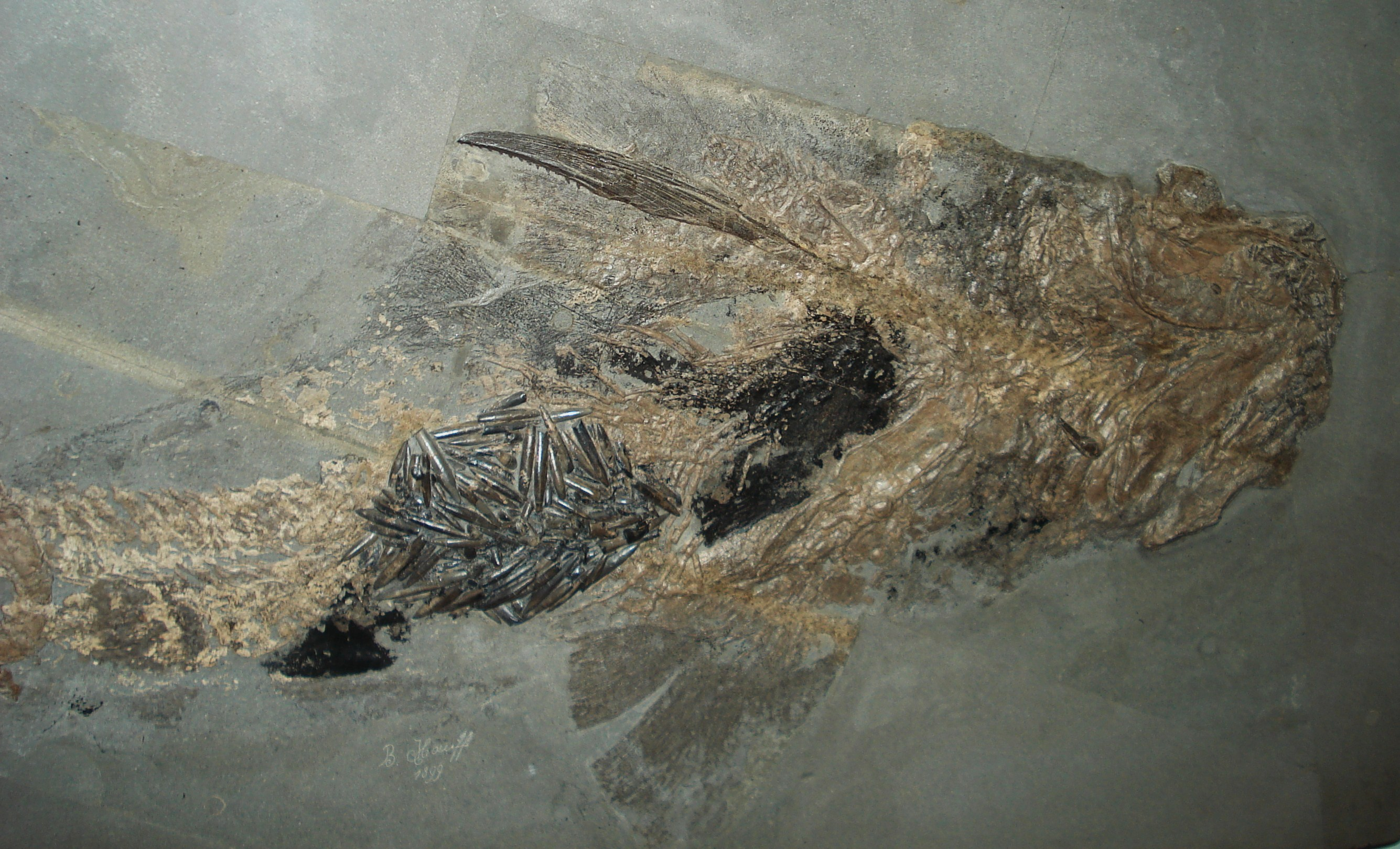
Fossil of Hybodus, with belemnites in the stomach region

- Clade Belemnoidea
  - Basal and unresolved
    - Genus Jeletzkya
    - Genus Belemnotheutis
  - Order Aulacocerida
    - Family Aulacoceratidae
    - Family Dictyoconitidae
    - Family Hematitidae
    - Family Palaeobelemnopseidae
    - Family Xiphoteuthidae
  - Order Belemnitida
    - Suborder Belemnitina
      - Family Cylindroteuthidae
      - Family Hastitidae
      - Family Oxyteuthidae
      - Family Passaloteuthidae
      - Family Salpingoteuthidae
    - Suborder Belemnopseina
      - Family Belemnitellidae
      - Family Belemnopseidae
      - Family Dicoelitidae
      - Family Dimitobelidae
      - Family Duvaliidae
    - Suborder Belemnotheutina
      - Family Belemnotheutidae
      - Family Chitinobelidae
      - Family Sueviteuthidae
  - Order Diplobelida
    - Family Chondroteuthidae
    - Family Diplobelidae
  - Order Phragmoteuthida
    - Family Phragmoteuthidae
    - Family Rhiphaeoteuthidae

== See also ==
- Nautiloidea
- Ammonoidea
- List of belemnites
