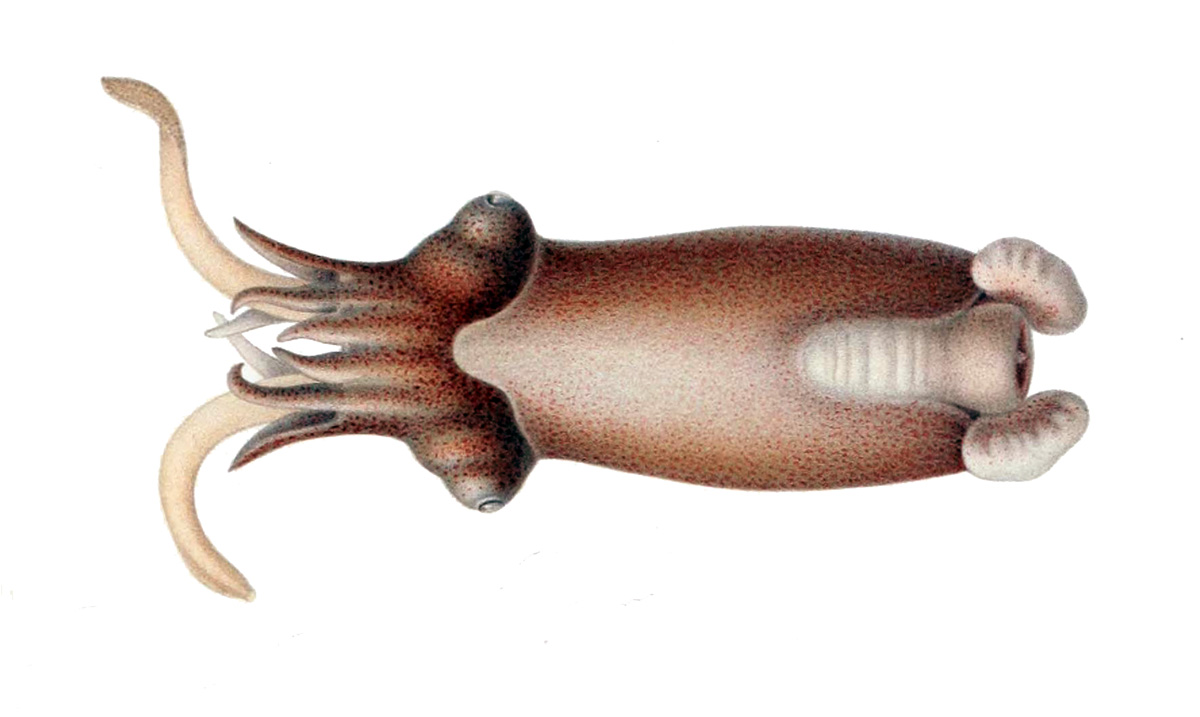
- Dorsal view of female
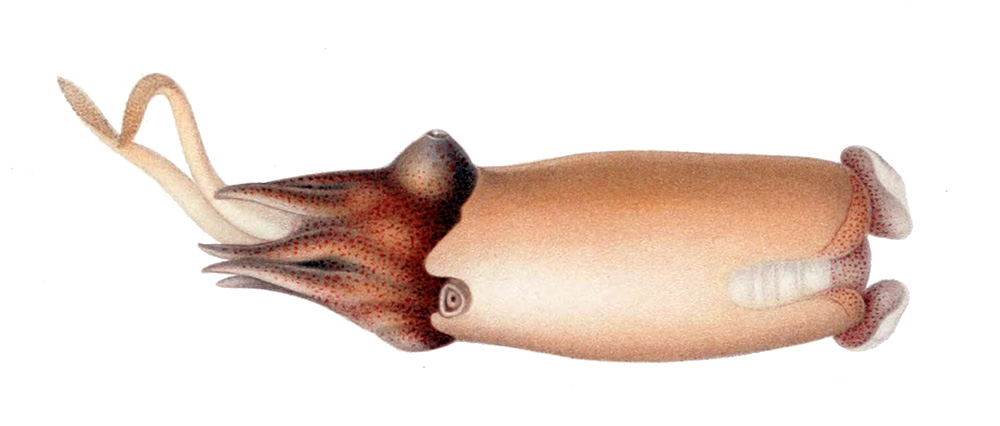
- Ventral view of female (chromatophores of mantle missing)

Conservation status
- Least Concern (IUCN 3.1)

Scientific classification
- Kingdom: Animalia
- Phylum: Mollusca
- Class: Cephalopoda
- Order: Spirulida
- Family: Spirulidae; Owen, 1836
- Genus: Spirula; Lamarck, 1799
- Species: S. spirula

Binomial name
- Spirula spirula (Linnaeus, 1758)

Synonyms
- Nautilus spirula Linnaeus, 1758

= Spirula =

Spirula spirula Temporal range: Miocene–Recent

Species of cephalopod

Spirula spirula is a species of deep-water squid-like cephalopod. It is the only extant member of the genus Spirula, the family Spirulidae, and the order Spirulida. Because of the shape of its internal shell, it is commonly known as the ram's horn squid or the little post horn squid. Because the live animal has a light-emitting organ, it is also sometimes known as the tail-light squid.

Live specimens of this cephalopod are very rarely seen because it is a deep-ocean dweller. The small internal shell of the species is, however, quite a familiar object to many beachcombers. The shell of Spirula is extremely light in weight, very buoyant, and surprisingly durable; it very commonly floats ashore onto tropical beaches (and sometimes even temperate beaches) all over the world. This seashell is known to shell collectors as the ram's horn shell or simply as Spirula.

== Taxonomy ==
Swedish botanist Carl Linnaeus described Nautilus spirula Linnaeus, 1758 in his book Systema Naturae. In 1799, French naturalist Jean-Baptiste Lamarck described the genus Spirula and transferred this species to it, and Spirula spirula is the name still used today for the ram's horn squid. S. spirula is the only species in the monotypic genus Spirula. A morphometric study published in 2010 showed that shell characteristics of S. spirula vary with geography, but no subspecies or additional species were proposed.

== Description ==
Spirula spirula has a squid-like body between 35 and 45 mm (1.4 and 1.8 in) long. It is a decapod, with eight arms and two longer tentacles, all with suckers. The arms and tentacles can all be withdrawn completely into the mantle. The species lacks a radula (or, at most, has a vestigial radula).

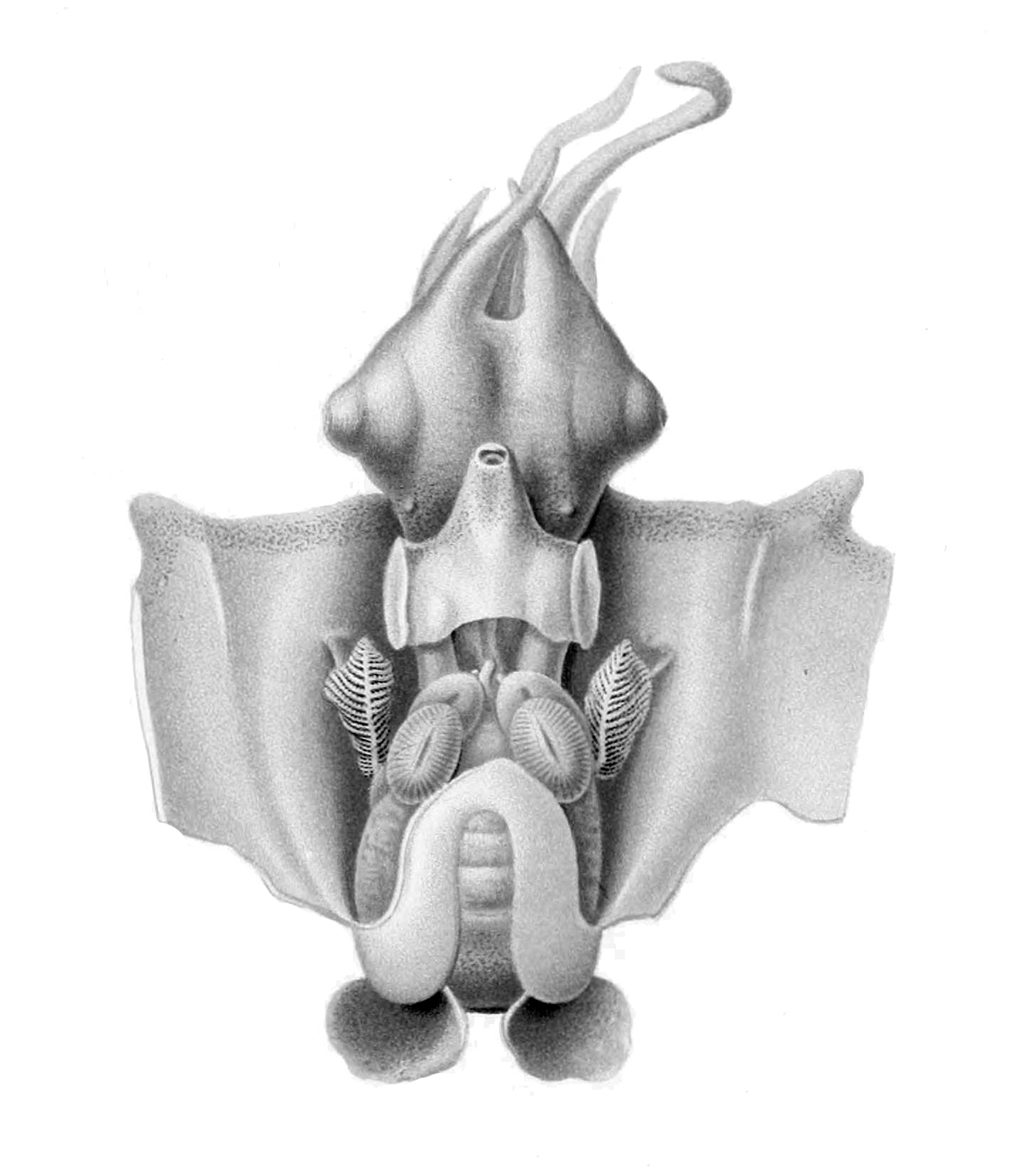
Female with dissected mantle cavity

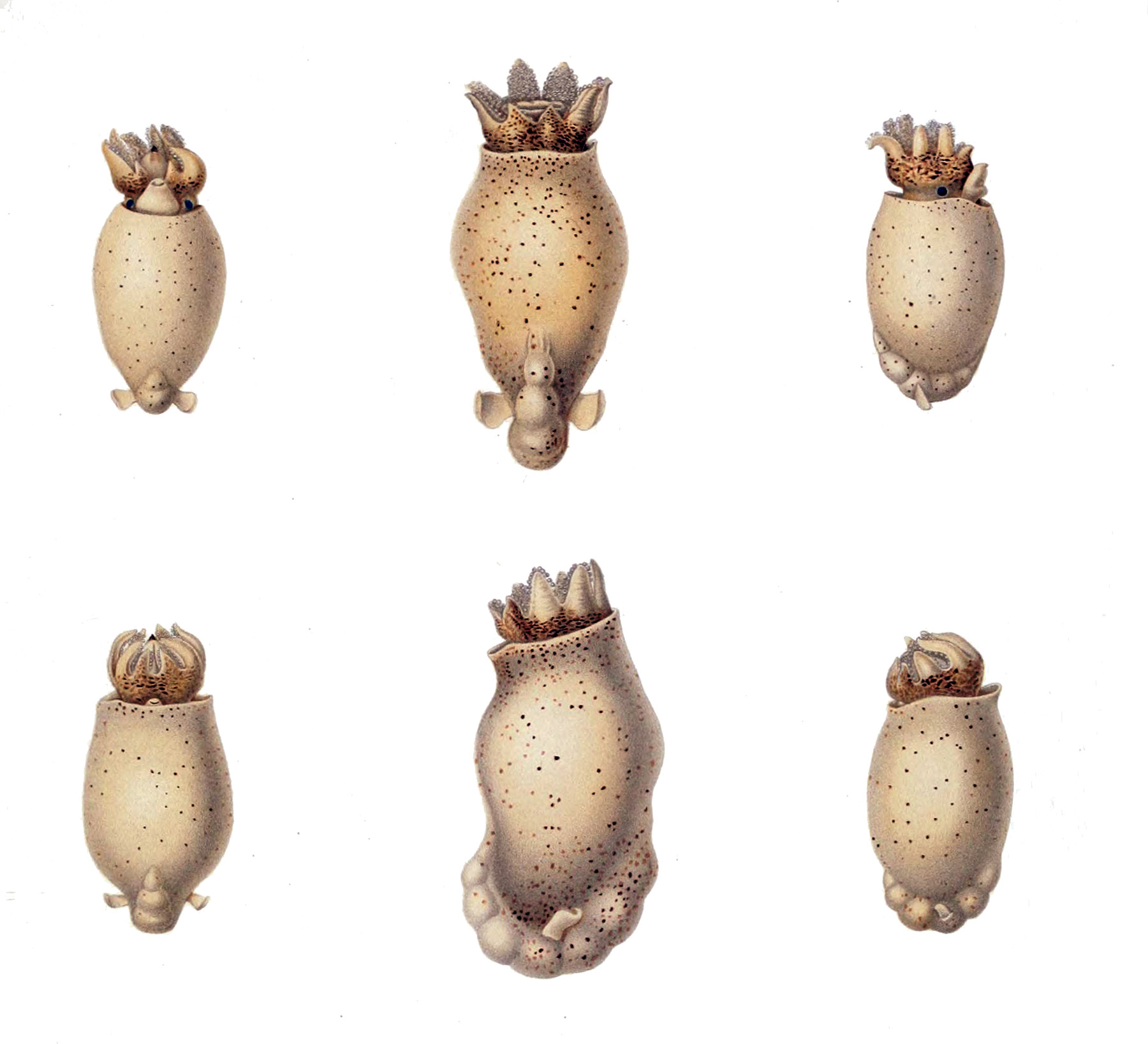
Immature specimens at various stages of development

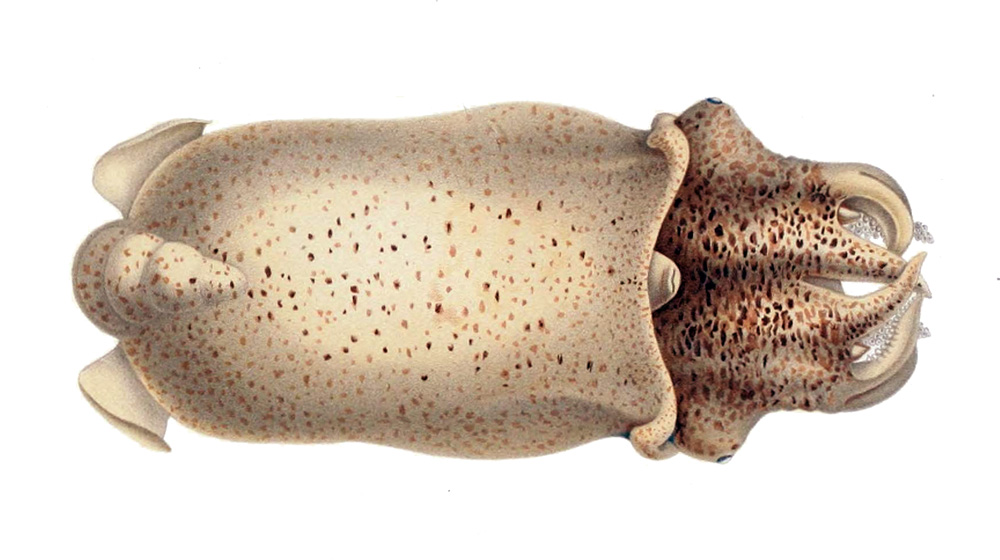
Immature specimen

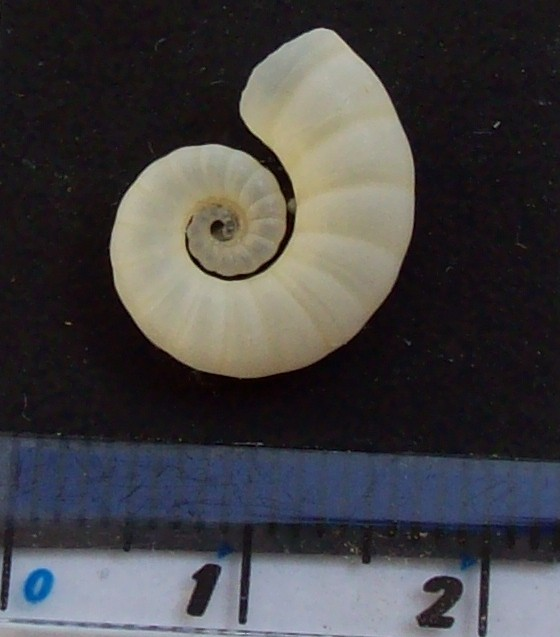
Side view of a Spirula shell (with a centimetre ruler for scale)

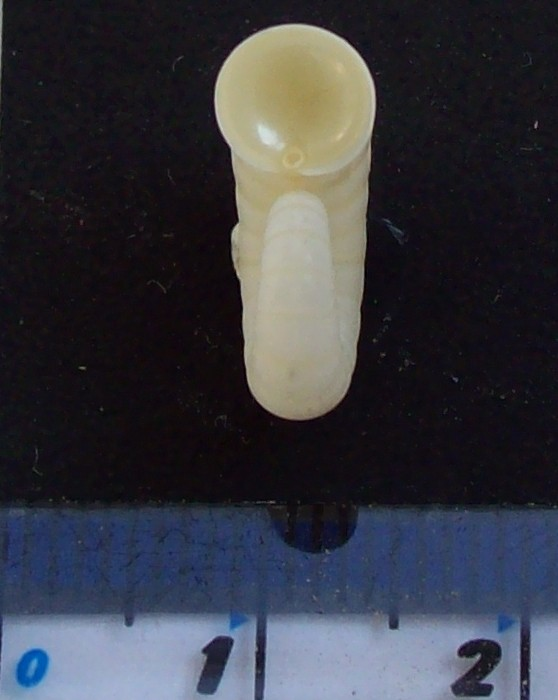
Ventral view; the siphuncle and the last septum of the phragmocone are visible

=== Shell ===
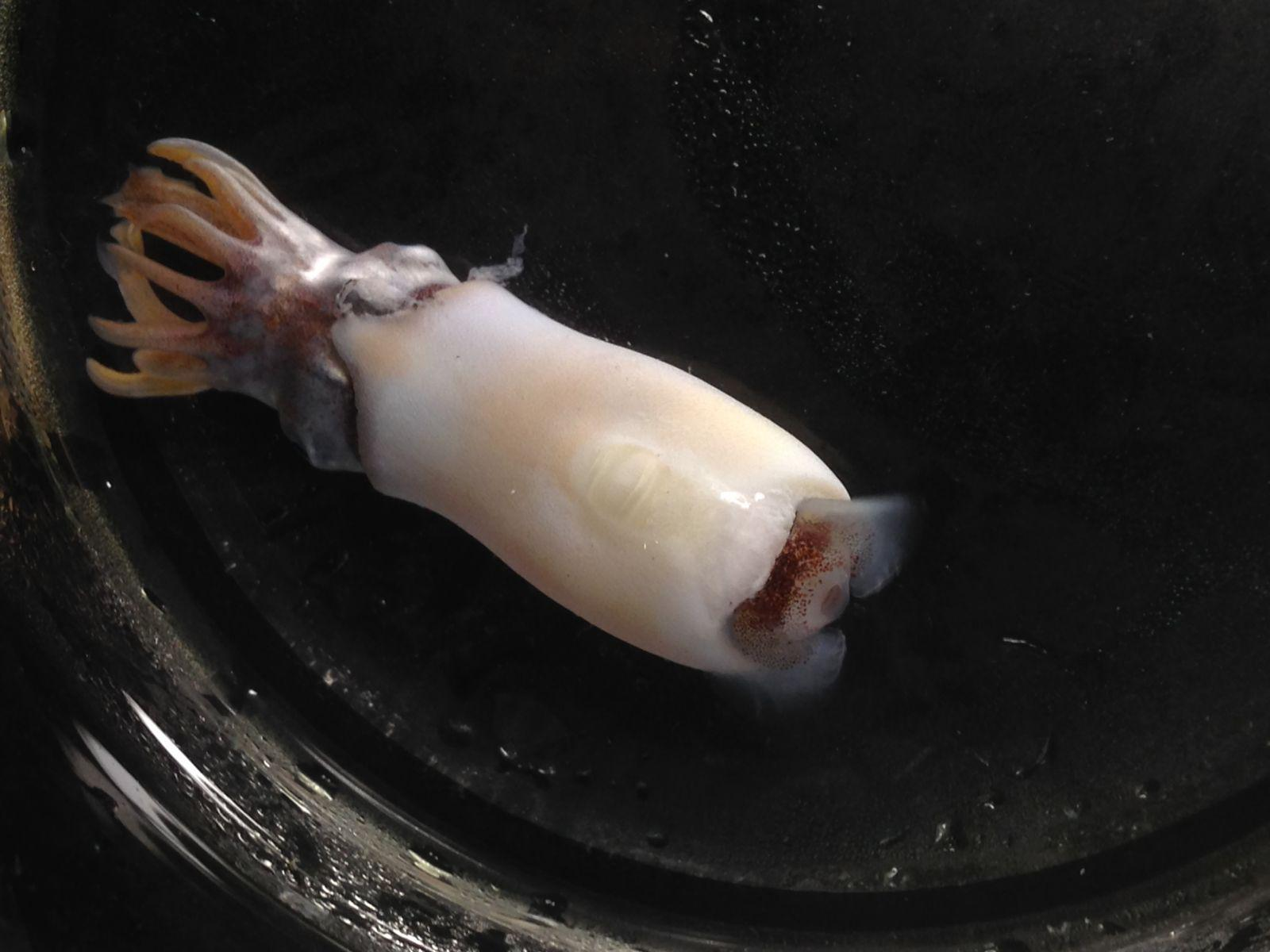
The shell can be seen at the top of the mantle.

The most distinctive feature of this species is its buoyancy organ, an internal, chambered, endogastrically coiled shell in the shape of an open planispiral (a flat spiral wherein the coils do not touch each other), and consisting of two prismatic layers. The shell functions to osmotically control buoyancy. Unlike the nautilus, which exchange air and liquid only in the three most adoral chambers (the remaining chambers always being gas-filled), spirula can bring cameral fluid into all of their chambers. Another trait is that it is mineralized, a feature only seen in cuttlefish and the nautilus amongst extant species of cephalopods.

The siphuncle is marginal, on the inner surface of the spiral.

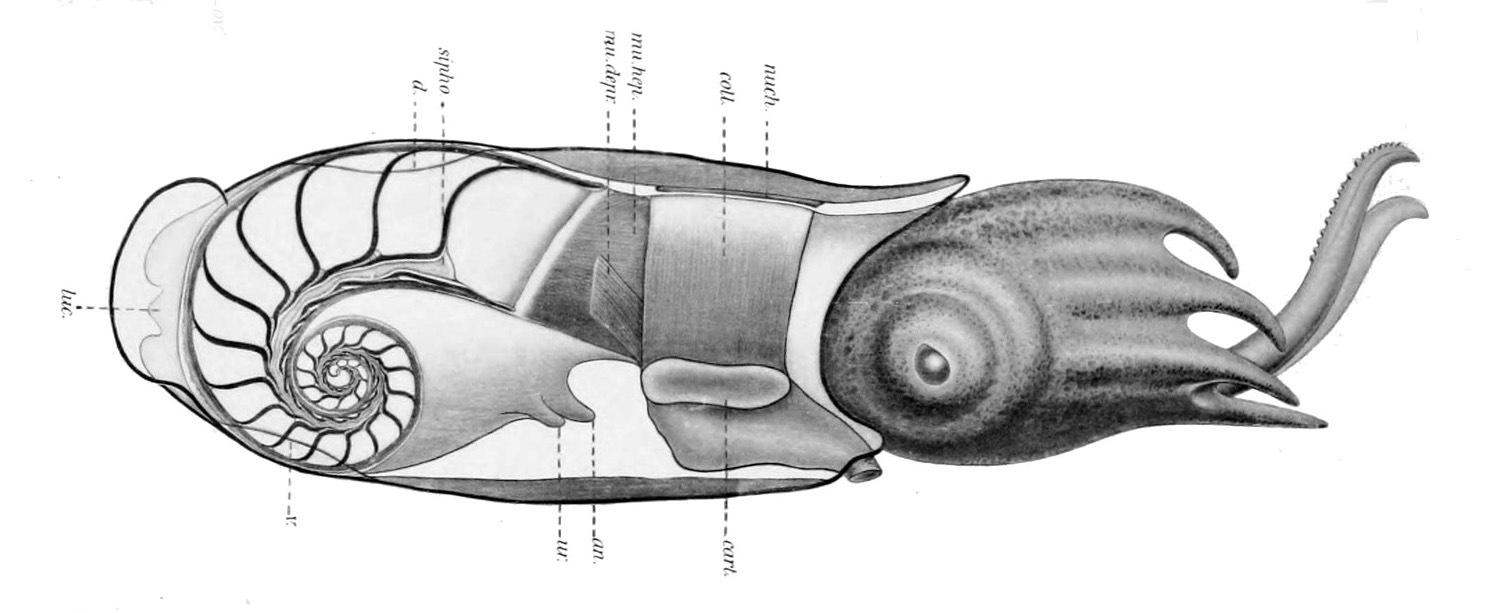
Illustration showing the position of the shell inside the mantle

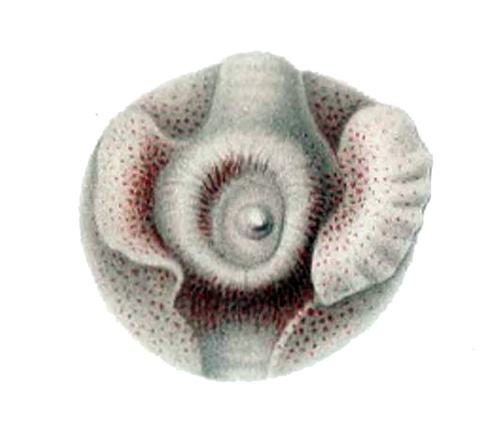
End of mantle showing the photophore

== Behaviour ==
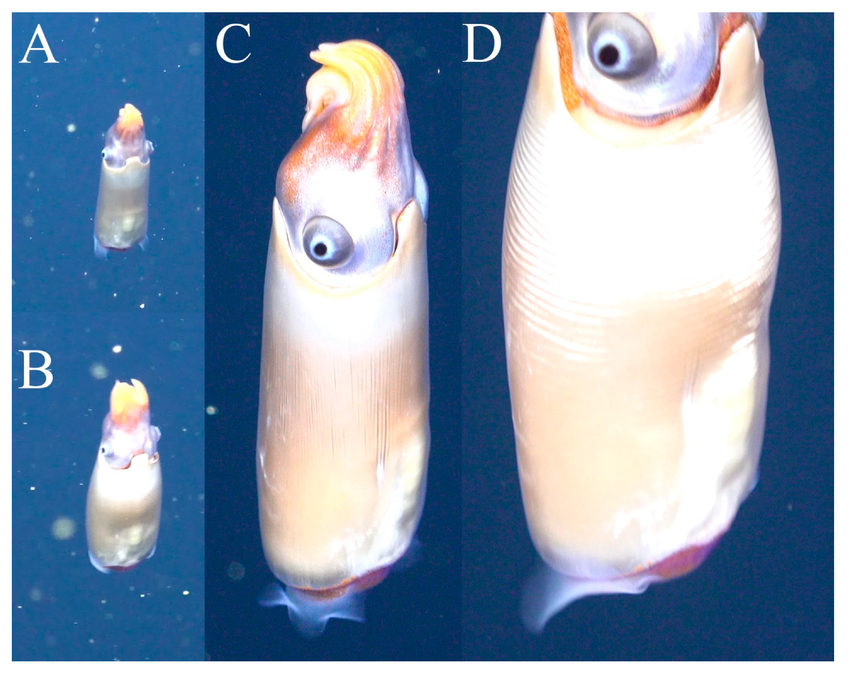
Photo sequence from the Great barrier reef: (A) resting (B) inflated mantle prior to jetting escape (C) resting position with curled arms (D) hyperinflated mantle at start of jetting escape.

Spirula spirula is capable of emitting a green light from a photophore located at the tip of its mantle, between the ear-shaped fins. Evidently this seems as a counter-illumination strategy, as in situ observations have captured footage of animals in a vertical stance, with photophore pointing downward and head up.

== Habitat and distribution ==
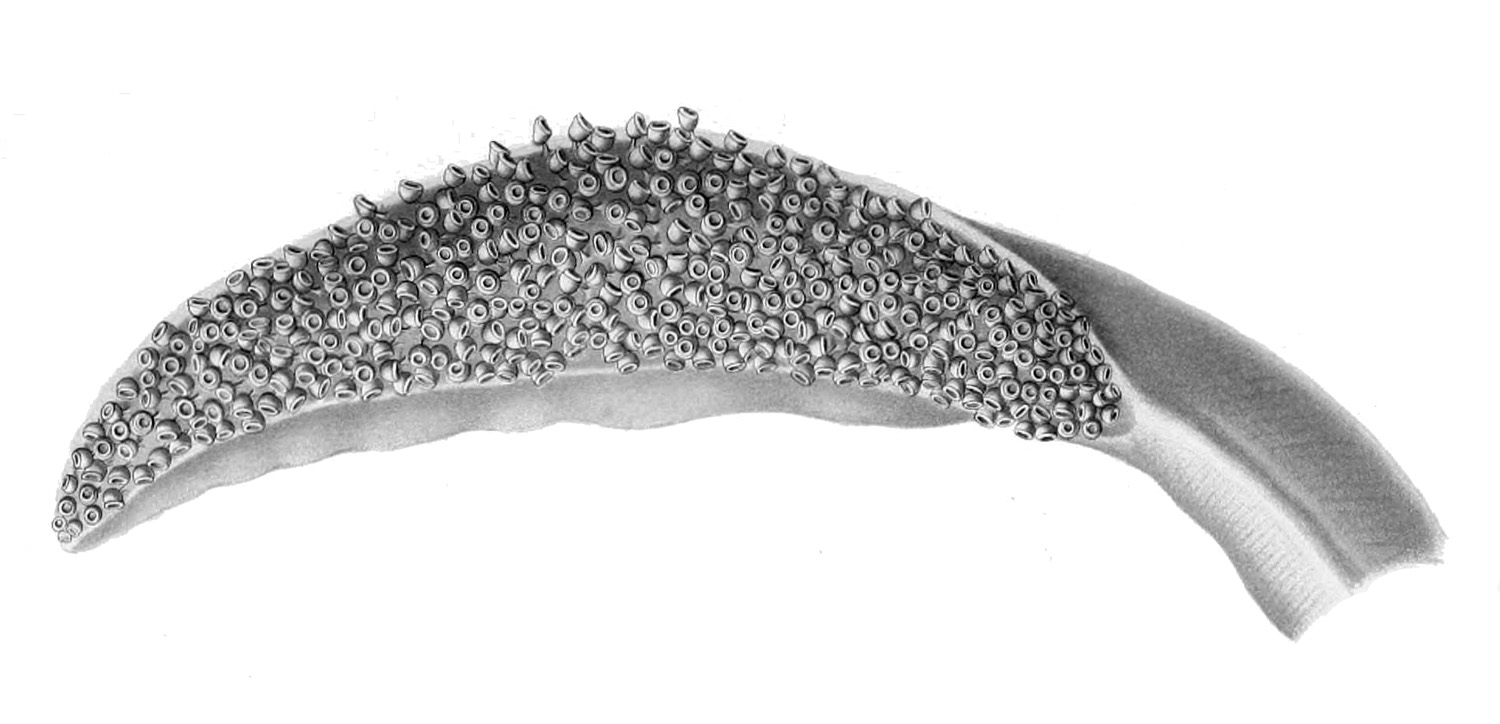
Oral view of the left tentacular club

By day, Spirula lives in the deep oceans, reaching depths of 1,000 m (3,300 ft). At night, it rises to 100–300 m (330–980 ft). Its preferred temperature is around 10 °C (50 °F), and it tends to live around oceanic islands, near the continental shelf.

Most sources cite this species as tropical and it is observed to be plentiful in the subtropical seas around the Canary Islands. Shells are regularly found along the western coasts of South Africa. In 2022, records of the species have also been confirmed in the Arabian Sea. However, significant quantities of shells from dead spirula are washed ashore even in temperate regions, such as coasts of New Zealand. Because of the great buoyancy of the shells, these may possibly have been carried long distances by ocean currents.

Much of the organism's life history has not been observed; for instance, it is thought to spawn in winter in deeper water, yet no spawnlings have been directly seen. It must occasionally venture into the upper 10 m (33 ft) of the sea, for they are sometimes found in albatross guts.

The species was observed for the first time in its natural habitat in 2020, when an ROV of the Schmidt Ocean Institute recorded it in the depths near the northern Great Barrier Reef.

== Evolutionary relationships ==
The order Spirulida also contains two extinct suborders: Groenlandibelina (including extinct families Groenlandibelidae and Adygeyidae), and Belopterina (including extinct families Belemnoseidae and Belopteridae).

Spirula is likely the closest living relative of the extinct belemnites and aulacocerids. These three groups as a unit are closely related to the cuttlefish, as well as to the true squids.

== See also ==
- Jellyella
