= Aulacocerida =

Scientific classification
- Kingdom: Animalia
- Phylum: Mollusca
- Class: Cephalopoda
- Superorder: †Belemnoidea
- Order: †Aulacocerida; Stolley 1919

Extinct order of molluscs

Aulacocerida is an order of primitive coleoid cephalopods, possibly derived from michelinoceraitids (Orthocerida) early in the Devonian, which in turn gave rise to the Belemnites.

Aulococerids are characterized by a straight, slim, conical shell with a large living chamber, simple aperture. The protoconch (initial, embryonic chamber) is egg-shaped and separated from the phragmocone by a constriction. The siphuncle is narrow and ventral, constricted at the septa and expanded in the middle of the chamber; necks are retrochoantiic, project backwards toward the apex. Nacre recovered from aulococerids as well as from belemnites resembles that found in recent Sepia and Spirula but differs from that of recent Nautilus.

Opinions vary as to whether aulococerids were endocochleate, having internal shells as with modern squid, or were ectocochleate, having external shells as with nautiloids and ammonites. Naef (in Bandel 1985) thought of aulacocerids as slender squids that looked similar to recent ones; morphologically similar to belemnites on one hand and to orthocerids on the other, but with a mantle that completely covered the shell; making them endocochliate. Jeletzky (in Bandel 1985) considered that aulocerids were essentially ectocochleate and that they lacked a muscular mantle, the rostrum having been secreted by mantle flaps that could be folded over the chambered shell, but were not fused around it, and which could be withdrawn into the long living chamber.

== See also ==
- List of belemnites
