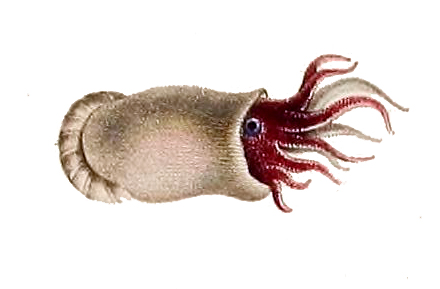
- Spirula spirula

Scientific classification
- Domain: Eukaryota
- Kingdom: Animalia
- Phylum: Mollusca
- Class: Cephalopoda
- Superorder: Decapodiformes
- Order: Spirulida; Stolley, 1919

Suborders
- †Groenlandibelina †Belopterina; Spirulina

= Spirulida =

Spirulida Temporal range:

Order of cephalopods

Spirulida is an order of cephalopods comprising one extant species (Spirula spirula) and several extinct taxa.

== Fossil record ==
- Oldest representative: Carboniferous, though contested: see Shimanskya
- Oldest uncontested representative: Late Jurassic

== Classification ==
Taxa marked with † are extinct.

- Order Spirulida
    - Family †Shimanskyidae
  - Suborder †Groenlandibelina Khromov, 1990
    - Family †Groenlandibelidae
    - Family †Adygeyidae
  - Suborder †Belopterina Engeser, 1998
    - Family †Belemnoseidae
    - Family †Belopteridae
  - Suborder Spirulina Pompeckj, 1912
    - Family †Spirulirostridae
    - Family †Spirulirostrinidae
    - Family Spirulidae
