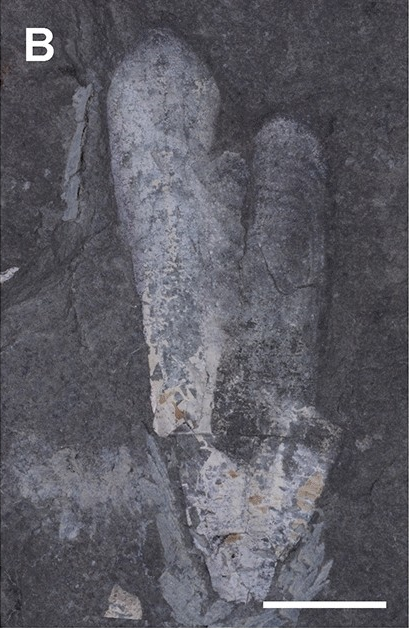
- Specimen of P. bisinuata
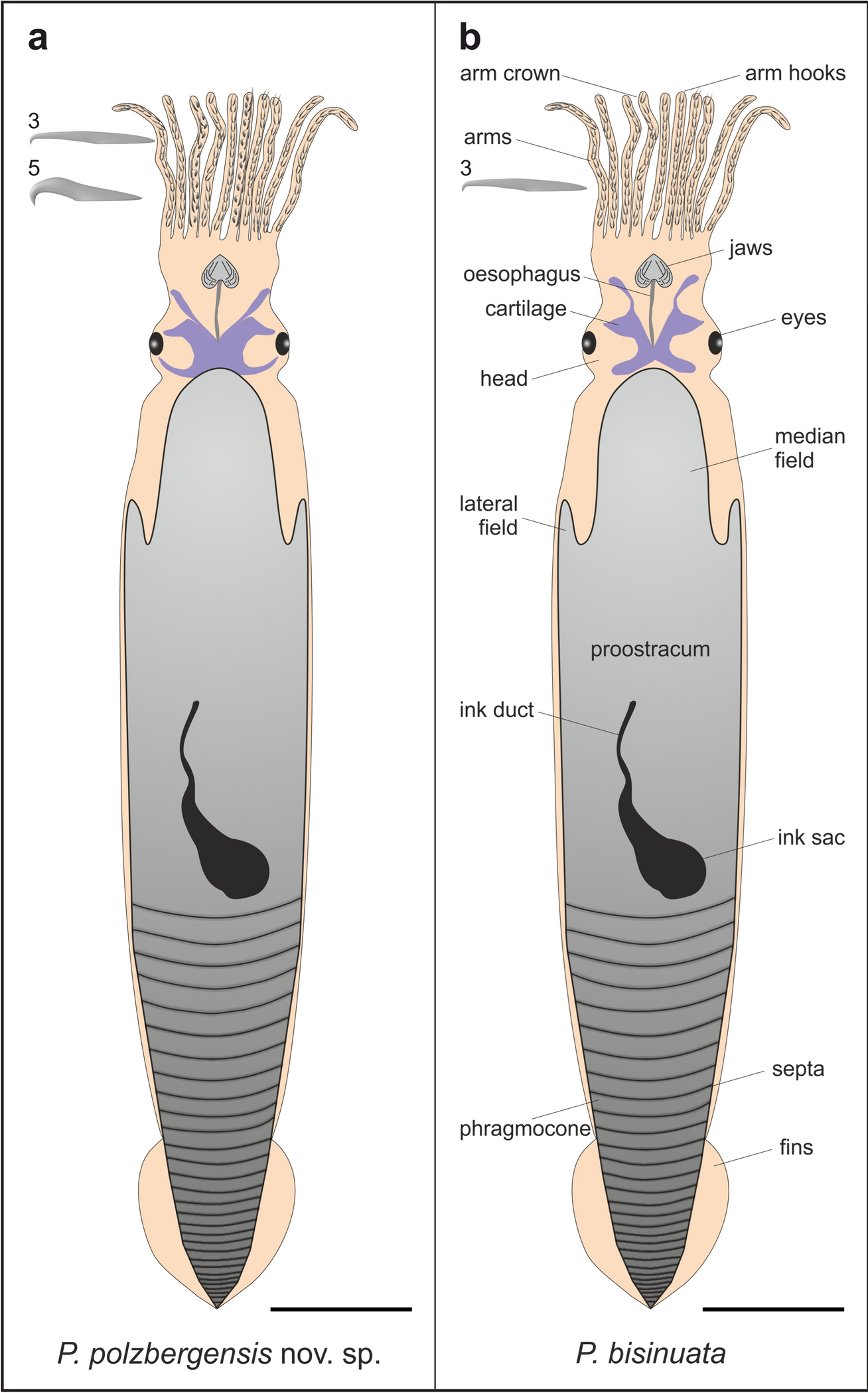
- Reconstruction of P. polzbergensis and P. bisinuata

Scientific classification
- Domain: Eukaryota
- Kingdom: Animalia
- Phylum: Mollusca
- Class: Cephalopoda
- Order: †Phragmoteuthida
- Family: †Phragmoteuthidae
- Genus: †Phragmoteuthis; Mojsisovics, 1882

Species
- P. bisinuata (Bronn, 1859); P. huxleyi Donovan, 2006; ?P. ticinensis Rieber, 1970; P. polzbergensis Lukeneder et al. 2024

Synonyms
- Acanthoteuthis bisinuata Bronn, 1859

= Phragmoteuthis =

Phragmoteuthis Temporal range: Late Triassic – Early Jurassic

Extinct genus of molluscs

Phragmoteuthis is a genus of extinct coleoid cephalopod known from the late Triassic to the lower Jurassic. Its soft tissue has been preserved; some specimens contain intact ink sacs. It had an internal phragmocone and ten arms.

Previously described species, P. conocauda and P. montefiorei got their own genus, Clarkeiteuthis.
