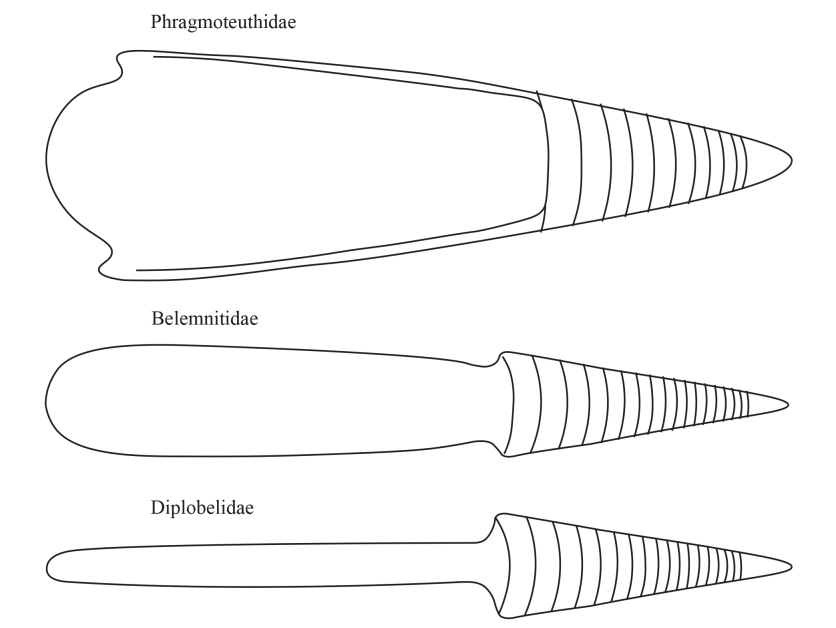
- Comparation of hard parts of Phragmoteuthida, Belemnitida and Diplobelida

Scientific classification
- Kingdom: Animalia
- Phylum: Mollusca
- Class: Cephalopoda
- Superorder: †Belemnoidea
- Order: †Phragmoteuthida; Jeletzky in Sweet, 1964

Families
- See text.

= Phragmoteuthida =

Phragmoteuthida Temporal range: Permian - Jurassic

Extinct order of molluscs

Phragmoteuthida is an order of extinct coleoid cephalopods characterized by a fan-like teuthoid pro-ostracum attached to a belemnoid-like phragmocone.

== Diagnosis ==
Jeletzky characterized phragmoteuthids as having a large tripartite, fanlike pro-ostracum forming the longest portion of the shell, attached to about three-quarters of the circumference of a comparatively small breviconic phragmocone with short camerae and superficially belemnitid-like siphuncle, an absent or much reduced rostrum at the apical part of the phragmocone, belemnite-like arm hooks, an ink sack, beaks resembling those of Recent teuthids, and a muscular mantle.

Donovan (2006), gives a similar description for Phragmoteuthis: Phragmocones as having an apical angle of between 20 and 30 degrees, and relatively few chambers compared with belemnoids; a multi-layered conotheca, thick-walled siphuncle, and a long, three-lobed pro-ostracum as in the Triassic species. Arms are short and bear pairs of slightly curved hooks.

== Classification ==
- Order †Phragmoteuthida
  - Family †Phragmoteuthididae
    - Genus †Permoteuthis
    - Genus †Phragmoteuthis
    - "unnamed form"
  - Family †Rhiphaeoteuthidae
    - Genus †Rhiphaeoteuthis
