= Permoteuthis =

Permoteuthis Temporal range: Changhsingian

Scientific classification
- Domain: Eukaryota
- Kingdom: Animalia
- Phylum: Mollusca
- Class: Cephalopoda
- Order: †Phragmoteuthida
- Family: †Phragmoteuthididae
- Genus: †Permoteuthis

Extinct genus of molluscs

Permoteuthis is a genus of belemnite, an extinct group of cephalopods.

== See also ==
- Belemnite
- List of belemnites
