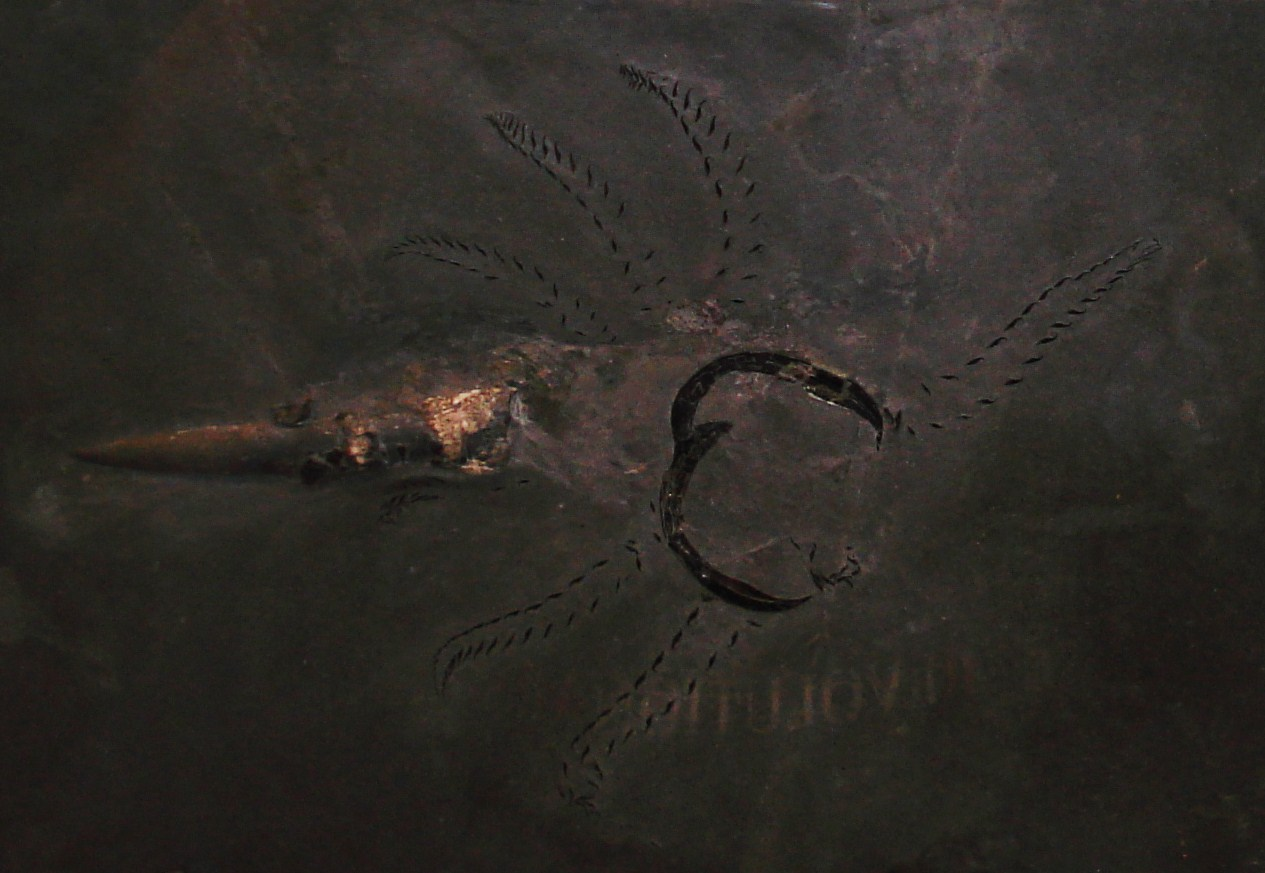
- Passaloteuthis paxillosa

Scientific classification
- Domain: Eukaryota
- Kingdom: Animalia
- Phylum: Mollusca
- Class: Cephalopoda
- Order: †Belemnitida
- Suborder: †Belemnitina

Families
- Cylindroteuthidae; Hastitidae; Oxyteuthidae; Passaloteuthidae; Salpingoteuthidae

= Belemnitina =

Belemnitina Temporal range: Early Jurassic to Early Cretaceous

Extinct suborder of molluscs

Belemnitina is a suborder of belemnites, an extinct group of cephalopods. They have been identified as the oldest of all the belemnites and are likely the stockgroup for them. They were extant from the early Jurassic to the early Cretaceous. Their geographic distribution was mostly limited to Europe, although specimens have been described in Japan suggesting they may have been more widespread than previously thought.

== Morphology ==
They have a broad, rounded pro-ostracum (the section of the guard (the hard internal skeleton commonly fossilised) closest to the head of the living animal). This characteristically lacks longitudinal alveolar canals and the associated splitting surfaces or open fissures. Commonly there are one or more longitudinal furrows in the apical region of the guard, similar furrows may be found in the alveolar region, these would not be accompanied by splitting surfaces or open fissures.

== Distribution ==
Based on current evidence it appears that the Belemnitina were mostly restricted to Europe prior to the Toarcian (late-early Jurassic), probably in small shelf seas until the Pliensbachian (middle-early Jurassic). After the middle Jurassic they appear to have spread but still remained primarily in Europe. They gradually retreated during the Jurassic, becoming extinct in the Mediterranean area in the Oxfordian (late Jurassic) times. The last remaining members of the Belemnitina disappear from North-western Europe at the Berremian-Aptian boundary (early Cretaceous).

== Stratigraphic range ==
Belemnitina first appear in the fossil record in the Hettangian (early Jurassic). Two genera, Schwegleria and aff. Subhastites are found in Hettangian sediments from Belgium, southwest Germany and northern Ireland. They are the oldest belemnites thus far found and have been suggested as a stockgroup for all belemnites. Belemnitina have also been found in Hettangian deposits in Japan, which implies an origin for this sub-group before the Jurassic. This fits with the evidence from other groups such as the Belemnitida which have been recorded approximately 33 million years before the Triassic-Jurassic boundary.

There appears to have been a replacement of Belemnitina with the sub-order Belemnopseina in North-western Europe before the Berremian-Aptian boundary. The long interval (47 million years) between the extinction in the Mediterranean region (Oxfordian) and that in North-western Europe (Aptian) implies that the Belemnitina survived in geographically isolated regions.
