= Adygeya =

Adygeya Temporal range: Early Cretaceous

Scientific classification
- Domain: Eukaryota
- Kingdom: Animalia
- Phylum: Mollusca
- Class: Cephalopoda
- Order: Spirulida
- Family: †Adygeyidae
- Genus: †Adygeya

Extinct genus of cephalopods

Adygeya is a genus of cephalopods assigned to the Spirulida.
