= Groenlandibelidae =

Groenlandibelidae Temporal range: Campanian – Maastrichtian

Scientific classification
- Domain: Eukaryota
- Kingdom: Animalia
- Phylum: Mollusca
- Class: Cephalopoda
- Stem group: Spirulida
- Family: †Groenlandibelidae; Jeletzky, 1966

Genera and species
- Groenlandibelus rosenkrantzi Jeletzky, 1966 (Birkelund, 1956); Cyrtobelys fuchs et al 2012; Naefia Wetzel, 1930

Extinct family of molluscs

Groenlandibelidae is an extinct family of coleoid cephalopods believed to belong to the spirulids.

Morphologically, its taxa seem to have some belemnoid characteristics, suggesting a possible intermediate relationship.

== Genera ==
=== Groenlandibelus Jeletzky, 1966 ===
Monospecific, Groenlandibelus rosenkrantzi Jeletzky, 1966 (Birkelund, 1956). The fossil range is from Campanian to Maastrichtian. Some material originally was ascribed to Belemnoteuthis before being allocated its own genus.

=== Cyrtobelus Fuchs et al 2012 ===
Some taxa now assigned to the Groenlandibelus are now assigned to Cyrtobelus. Species:

- Cyrtobelus birkelundae Fuchs et al. 2012
- C. hornbyense Fuchs et al. 2012

The fossil range is from Upper Campanian to upper Maastrichtian with localities in Vancouver Island (BC) and West Greenland.

=== Naefia Wetzel, 1930 ===
The fossil range of Naefia is from Cenomanian to Campanian.
