= List of mollusc orders =

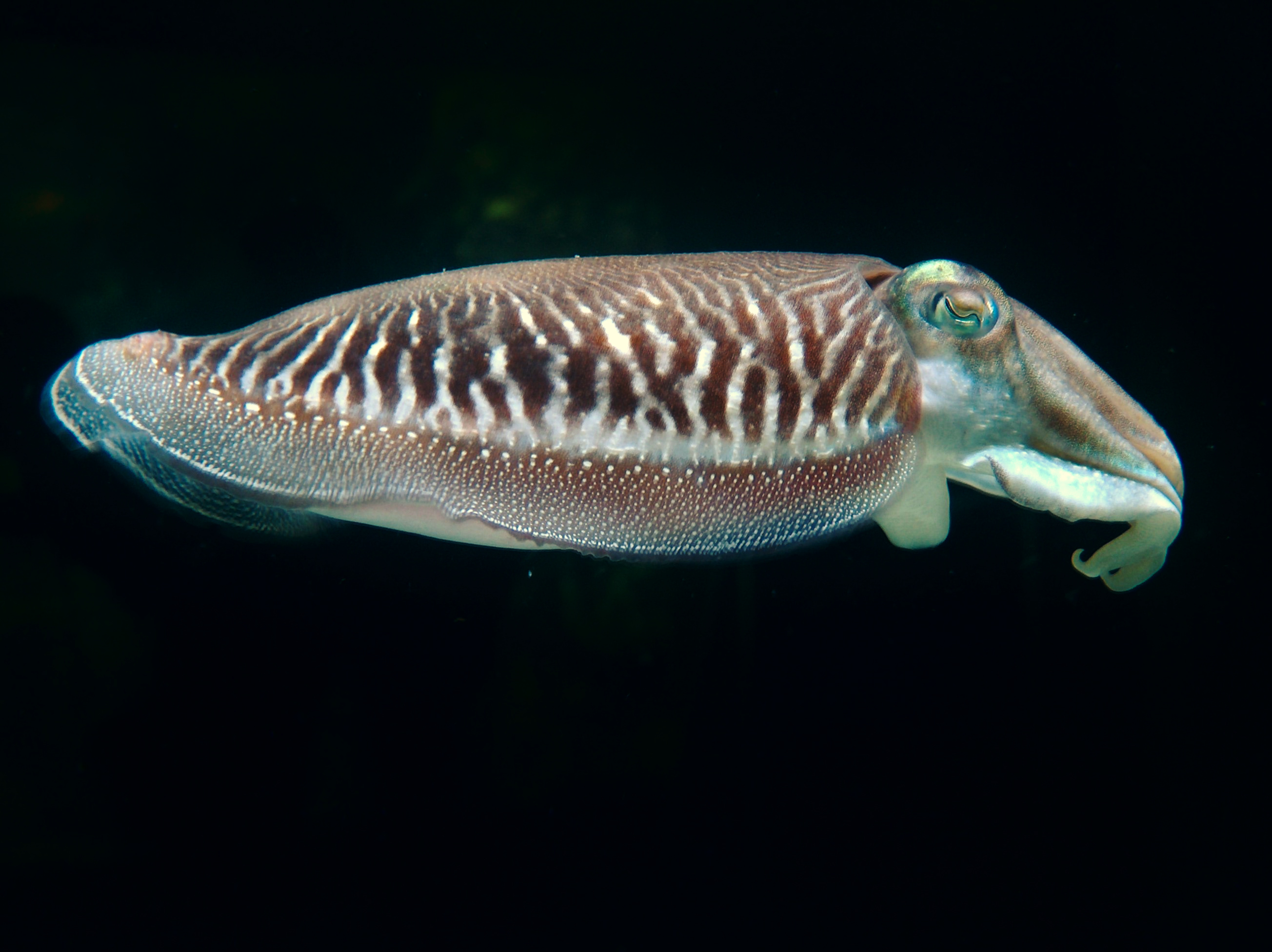
Cuttlefish of the order Sepiida

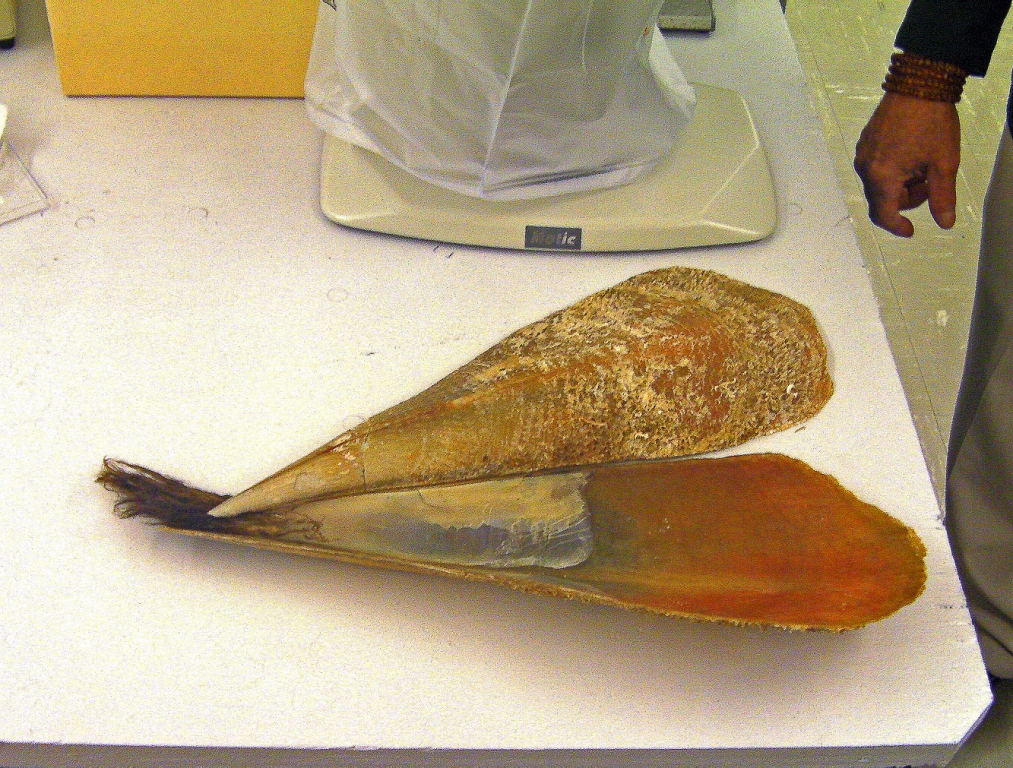
Pinna nobilis shell and byssus

List of mollusc orders illustrates the 97 orders in the phylum Mollusca, the largest marine animal phylum. 85,000 extant species are described, making up 23% of described marine organisms.

== Class Aplacophora ==
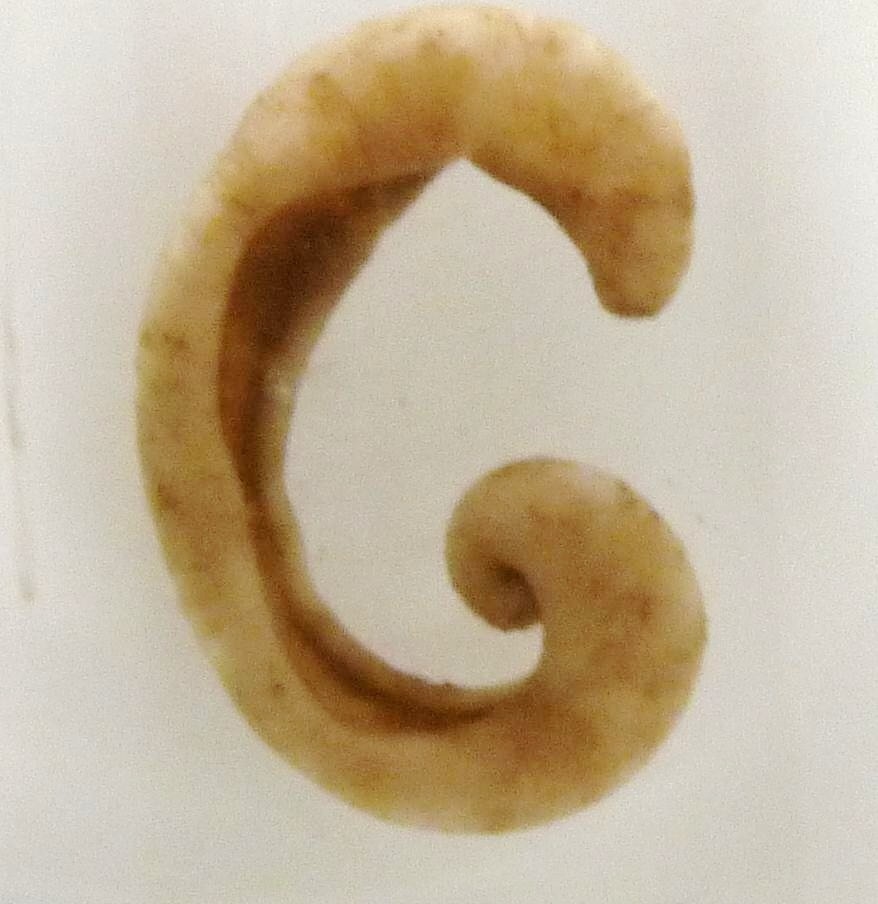
Epimenia verrucosa

=== Subclass Caudofoveata ===
No orders, 6 families, 15 genera, 150 species.

=== Subclass Solenogastres ===
- Order Neomeniamorpha
- Order Pholidoskepia

== Testaria (unranked) ==
=== Class Polyplacophora (Chitons) ===
- Order Multiplacophora †
- Order Neoloricata
- Order Paleoloricata †

=== Subphylum Conchifera ===
==== Class Bivalvia ====
===== Subclass Heterodonta =====
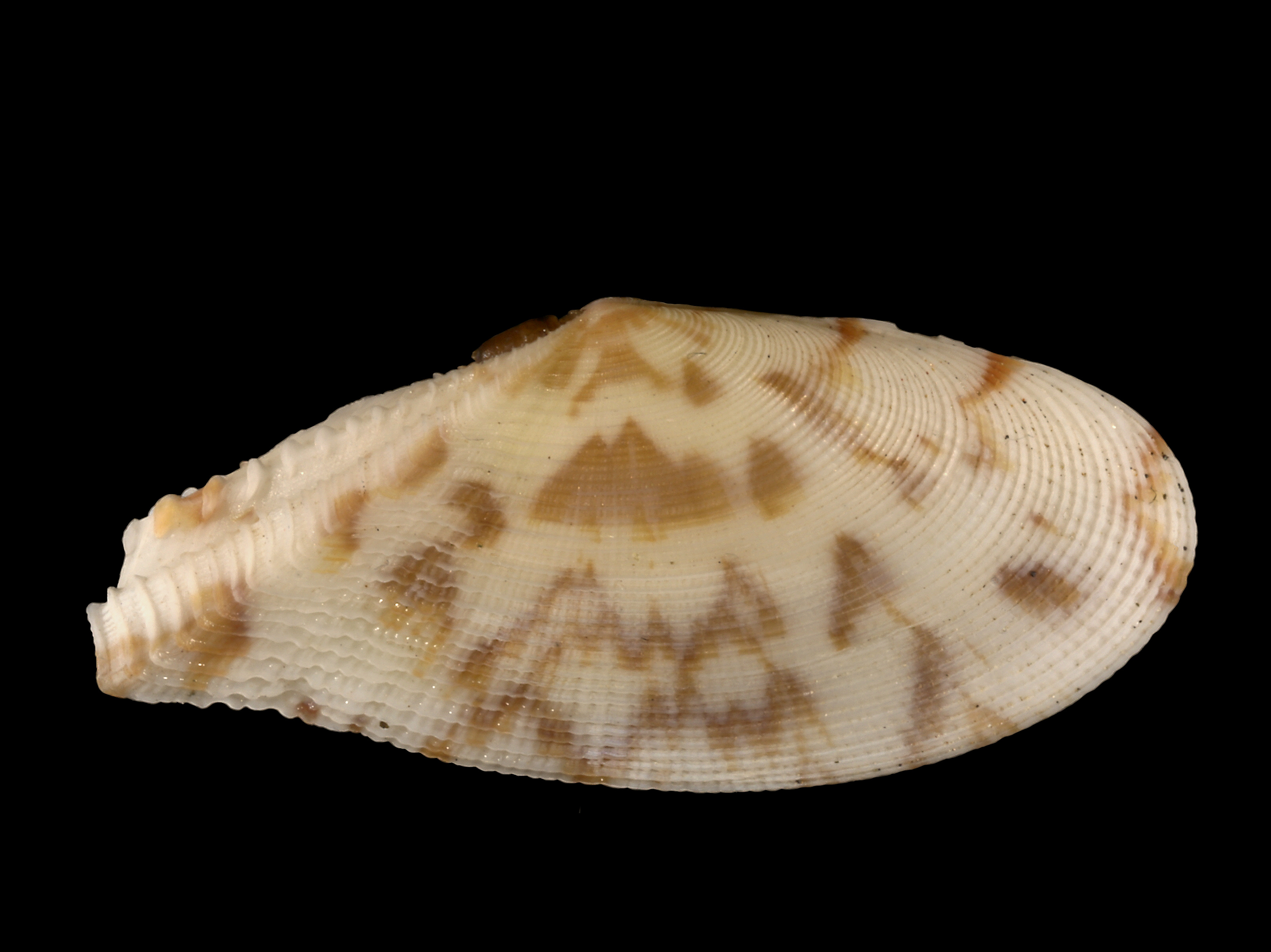
The right valve of a shell of Tellinella listeri, anterior end towards the right

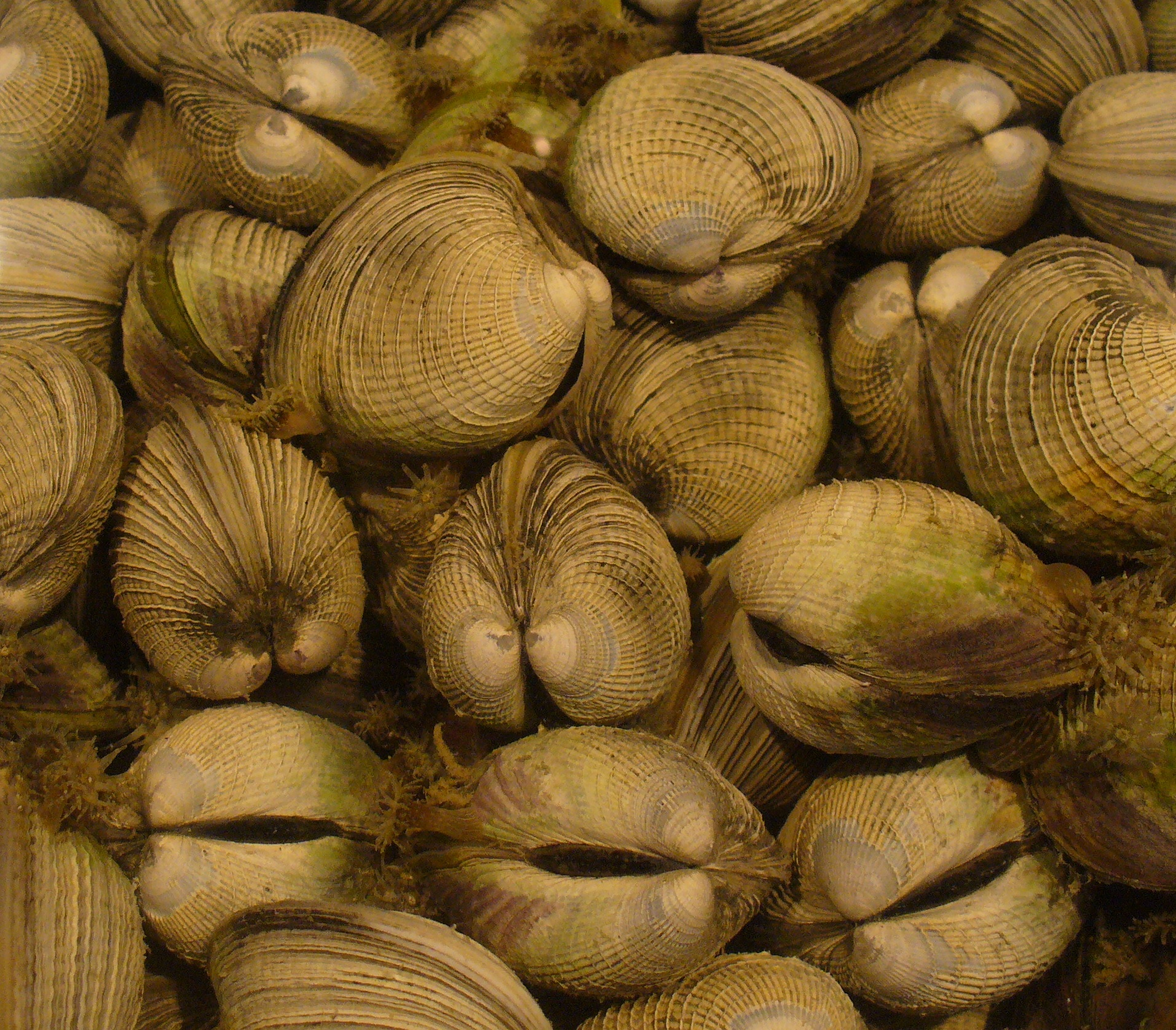
The venerid species, Austrovenus stutchburyi

- Superfamily Arcticoidea
- Superfamily Cardioidea
- Superfamily Chamoidea
- Superfamily Clavagelloidea
- Superfamily Crassatelloidea
- Superfamily Cuspidarioidea
- Superfamily Hippuritoida †
- Superfamily Cyamioidea
- Superfamily Cyrenoidea
- Superfamily Cyrenoidoidea
- Superfamily Dreissenoidea
- Superfamily Galeommatoidea
- Superfamily Gastrochaenoidea
- Superfamily Glossoidea
- Superfamily Hemidonacoidea
- Superfamily Hiatelloidea
- Superfamily Limoidea
- Superfamily Lucinoidea
- Superfamily Mactroidea
- Superfamily Myoidea
- Superfamily Pandoroidea
- Superfamily Pholadoidea
- Superfamily Pholadomyoidea
- Superfamily Solenoidea
- Superfamily Sphaerioidea
- Superfamily Tellinoidea
- Superfamily Thyasiroidea
- Superfamily Ungulinoidea
- Superfamily Veneroidea
- Superfamily Verticordioidea

===== Subclass Palaeoheterodonta =====
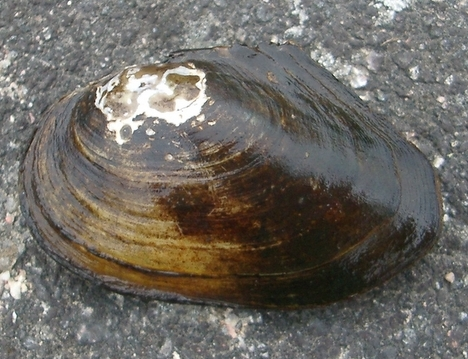
Anodonta anatina

- Superfamily Trigonioidea
- Superfamily Unionoidea

===== Subclass Protobranchia =====
- Superfamily Manzanelloidea
- Superfamily Nuculanoidea
- Superfamily Nuculoidea
- Superfamily Sapretoidea
- Superfamily Solemyoidea

===== Subclass Pteriomorphia =====
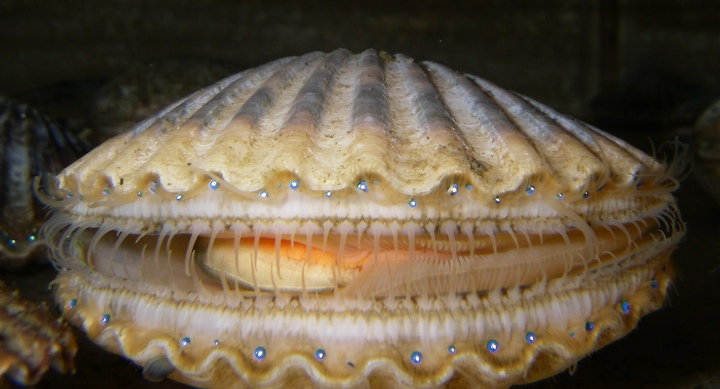
A live individual of Argopecten irradians, family Pectinidae

- Superfamily Anomioidea
- Superfamily Arcoidea
- Superfamily Dimyoidea
- Superfamily Limoidea
- Superfamily Mytiloidea
- Superfamily Ostreoidea
- Superfamily Pectinoidea
- Superfamily Pinnoidea
- Superfamily Plicatuloidea
- Superfamily Pterioidea

==== Class Cephalopoda ====
===== Subclass Nautiloidea =====
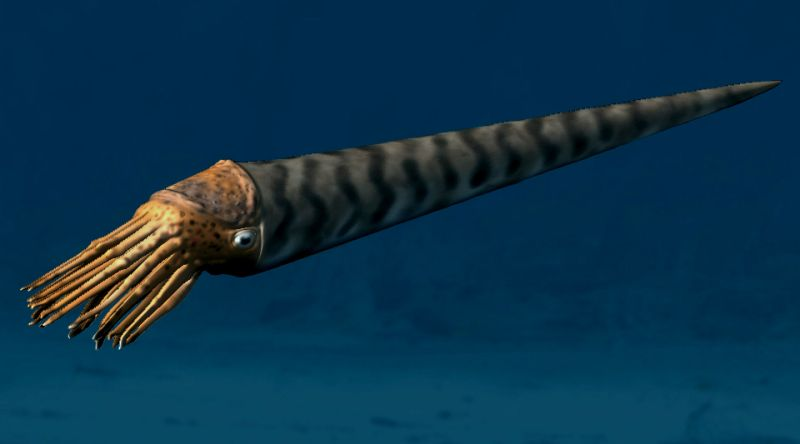
A nautiloid

- Order Plectronocerida †
- Order Ellesmerocerida †
- Order Actinocerida †
- Order Pseudorthocerida †
- Order Ascocerida †
- Order Endocerida †
- Order Tarphycerida †
- Order Oncocerida †
- Order Discosorida †
- Order Nautilida
- Order Orthocerida †
- Order Lituitida †
- Order Dissidocerida †
- Order Bactritida †

===== Subclass Ammonoidea † =====
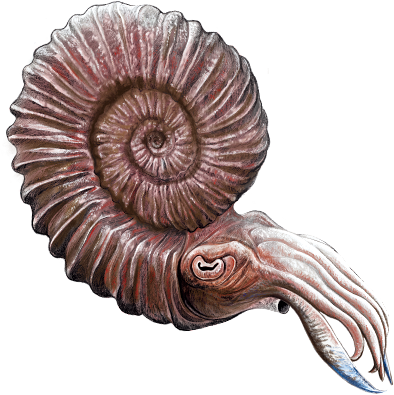
Artist's reconstruction of the ammonite Pleuroceras

- Order Goniatitida †
- Order Prolecanitida †
- Order Ceratitida †
- Order Ammonitida †

==== Subclass Coleoidea ====
===== Division Belemnitida =====
- Order Belemnoidea †
- Order Aulacocerida †
- Order Phragmoteuthida †
- Order Donovaniconida †
- Order Belemnitida †
- Order Hematitida †

===== Division Neocoleoidea (most living cephalopods) =====
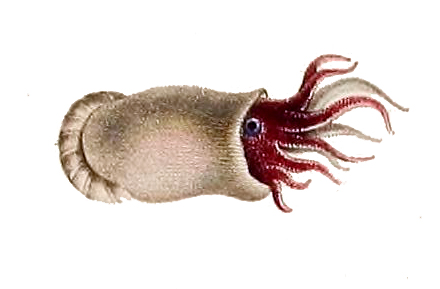
A spirula spirula squid

- Superorder Decapodiformes
  - Order Boletzkyida †
  - Order Spirulida ram's horn squid
  - Order Sepiida cuttlefish
  - Order Sepiolida bobtail squid
  - Order Teuthida squid
- Superorder Octopodiformes
  - Order Vampyromorphida vampire squid
  - Order Octopoda octopus

==== Class Gastropoda ====
This overview of orders follows the taxonomy of the Gastropoda (Ponder & Lindberg, 1997):

- Order Bellerophontinaka (fossil)
- Order Mimospirina (fossil)

Subclass Eogastropoda

- Order Euomphalida de Koninck 1881 (fossil)
- Order Patellogastropoda Lindberg, 1986 (true limpets)

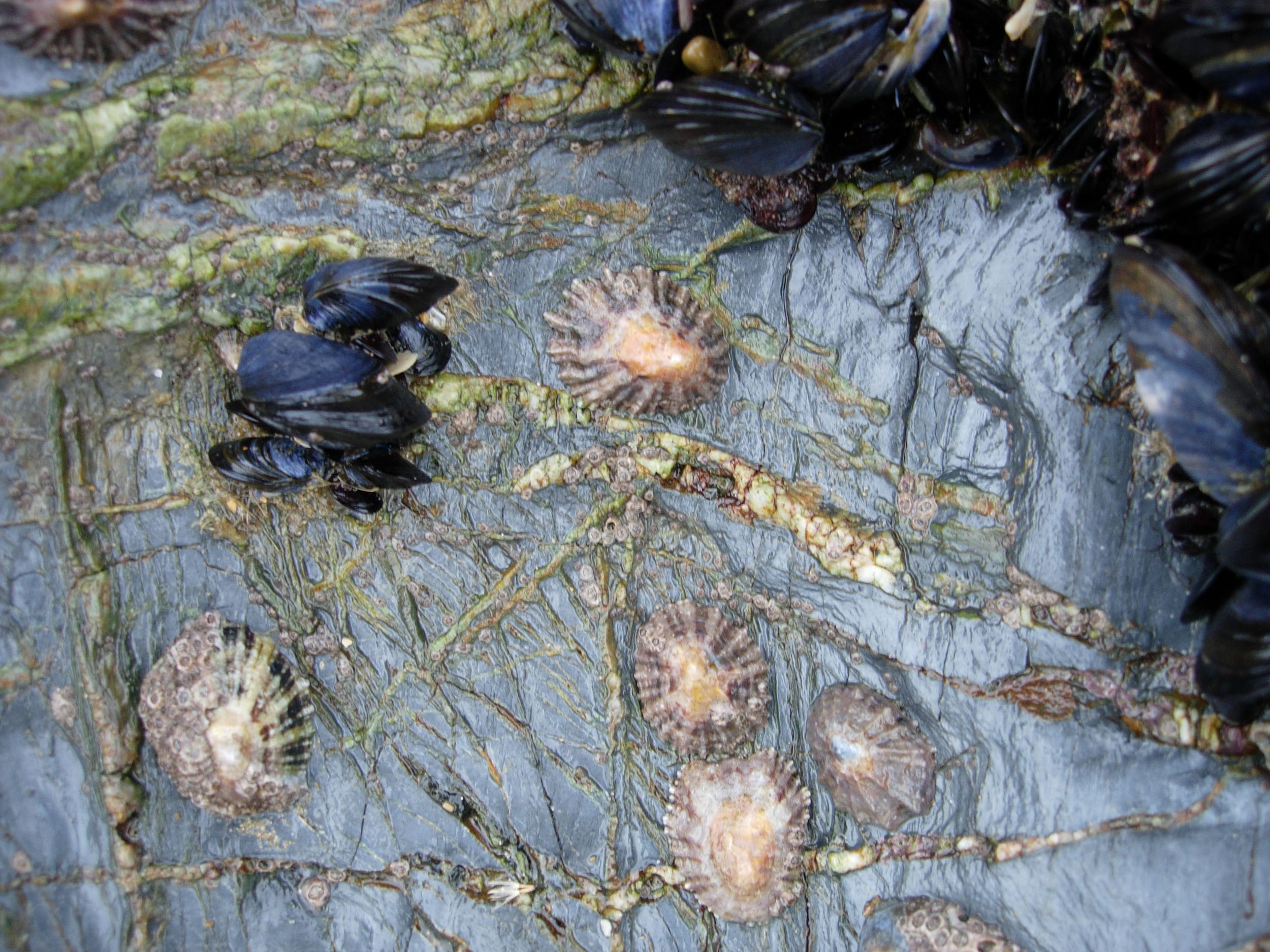
Live limpets in the intertidal zone in Cornwall, England.

Subclass Orthogastropoda Ponder & David R. Lindberg, 1996

- Order Murchisoniina Cox & Knight, 1960 (fossil)
- Order Neomphaloida Sitnikova & Starobogatov, 1983

Superorder Vetigastropoda Salvini-Plawen, 1989 (limpets)

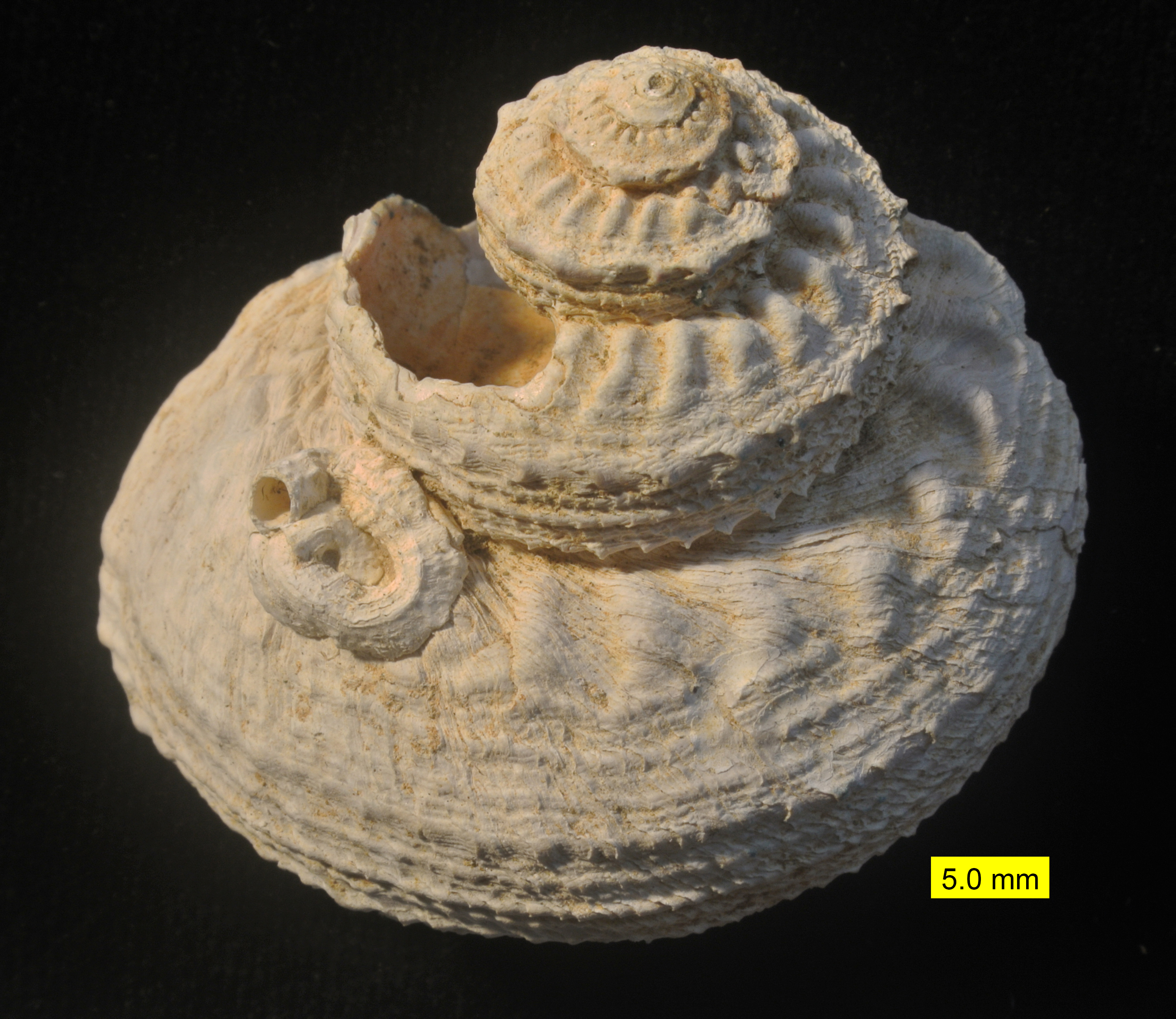
The shell of an archaeogastropod from the Pliocene of Cyprus. A serpulid worm is attached.

Superorder Neritaemorphi Koken, 1896

- Order Cyrtoneritomorpha (fossil)
- Order Neritopsina Cox & Knight, 1960

Superorder Caenogastropoda Cox, 1960

- Order Architaenioglossa Haller, 1890
- Order Sorbeoconcha Ponder & David R. Lindberg, 1997
  - Infraorder Littorinimorpha Golikov & Starobogatov, 1975
  - Infraorder Ptenoglossa J.E. Gray, 1853
  - Infraorder Neogastropoda Thiele, 1929

Superorder Heterobranchia J.E. Gray, 1840

- Order Heterostropha P. Fischer, 1885
- Order Opisthobranchia Milne-Edwards, 1848
  - Infraorder Euthecosomata
  - Infraorder Pseudothecosomata
  - Infraorder Anthobranchia Férussac, 1819
  - Infraorder Cladobranchia Willan & Morton, 1984
  - Suborder Eupulmonata Haszprunar & Huber, 1990
    - Infraorder Acteophila Dall, 1885 (= formerly Archaeopulmonata)

==== Class Monoplacophora ====
- Order Tryblidiida

==== Class Rostroconchia † ====
- Order Conocardiida † Newell, 1965
- Order Ribeirioida † Kobayashi, 1933
- Order Tuarangiida † MacKinnon, 1982

==== Class Scaphopoda (Tusk shells) ====
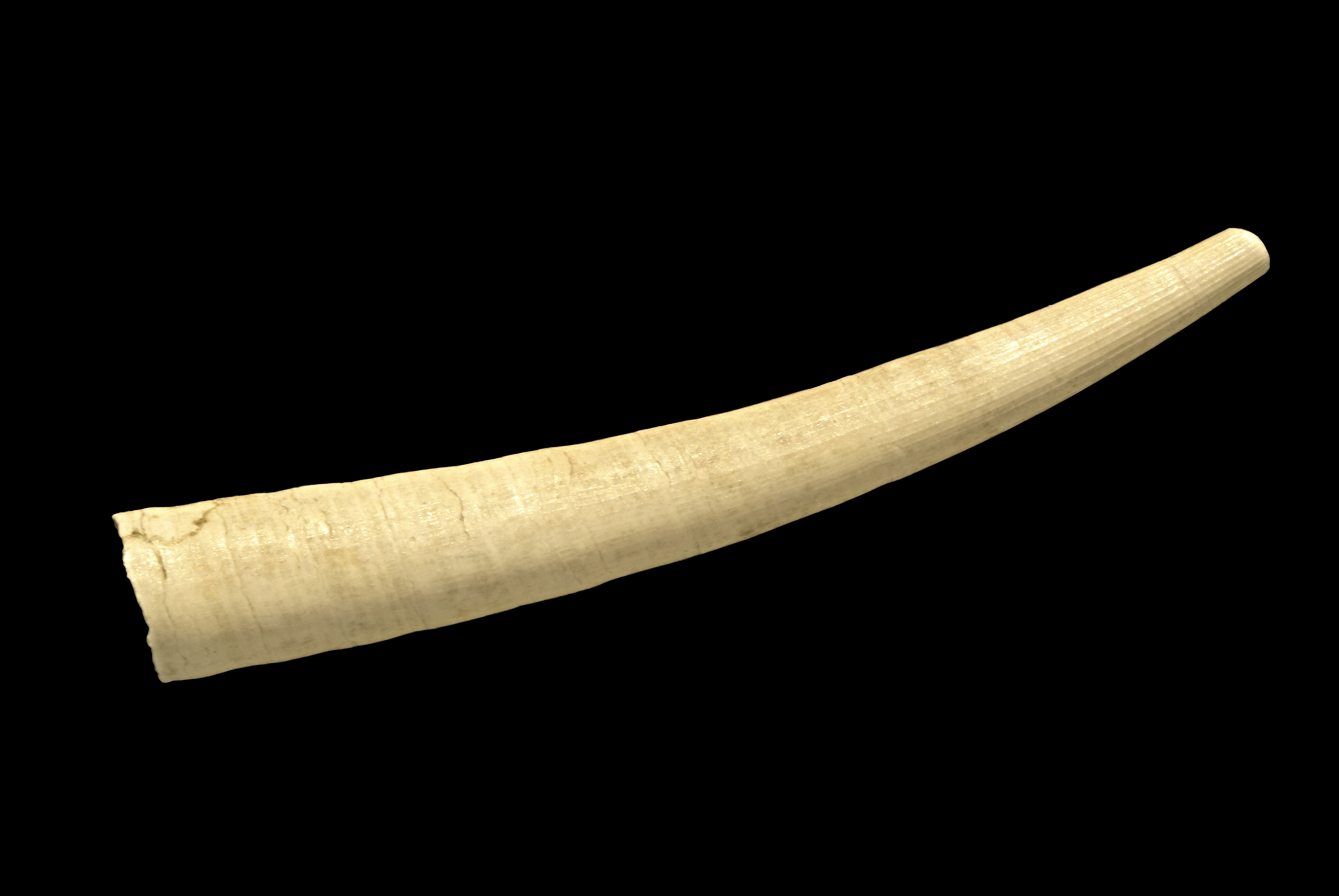
A tusk shell of the scaphopod Antalis vulgaris

- Order Dentaliida
- Order Gadilida

== See also ==
- 2010 Bivalvia taxonomy
- Taxonomy of the Gastropoda (Bouchet & Rocroi, 2005)
- Taxonomy of the Gastropoda (Bouchet et al., 2017)
- Taxonomy of the Gastropoda (Ponder & Lindberg, 1997)
- Taxonomy of the Conoidea (Tucker & Tenorio, 2009)
