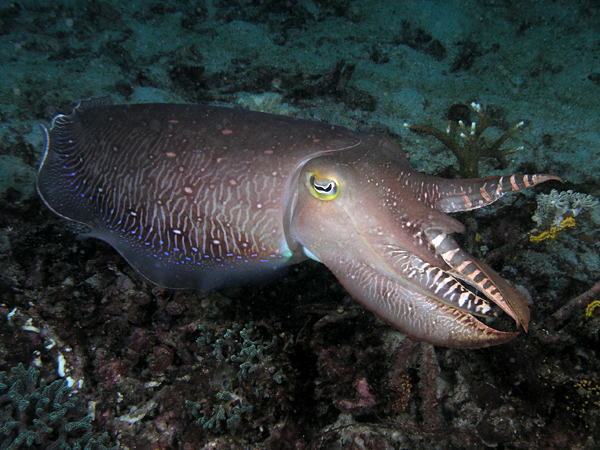
- A cuttlefish (Decapodiformes)
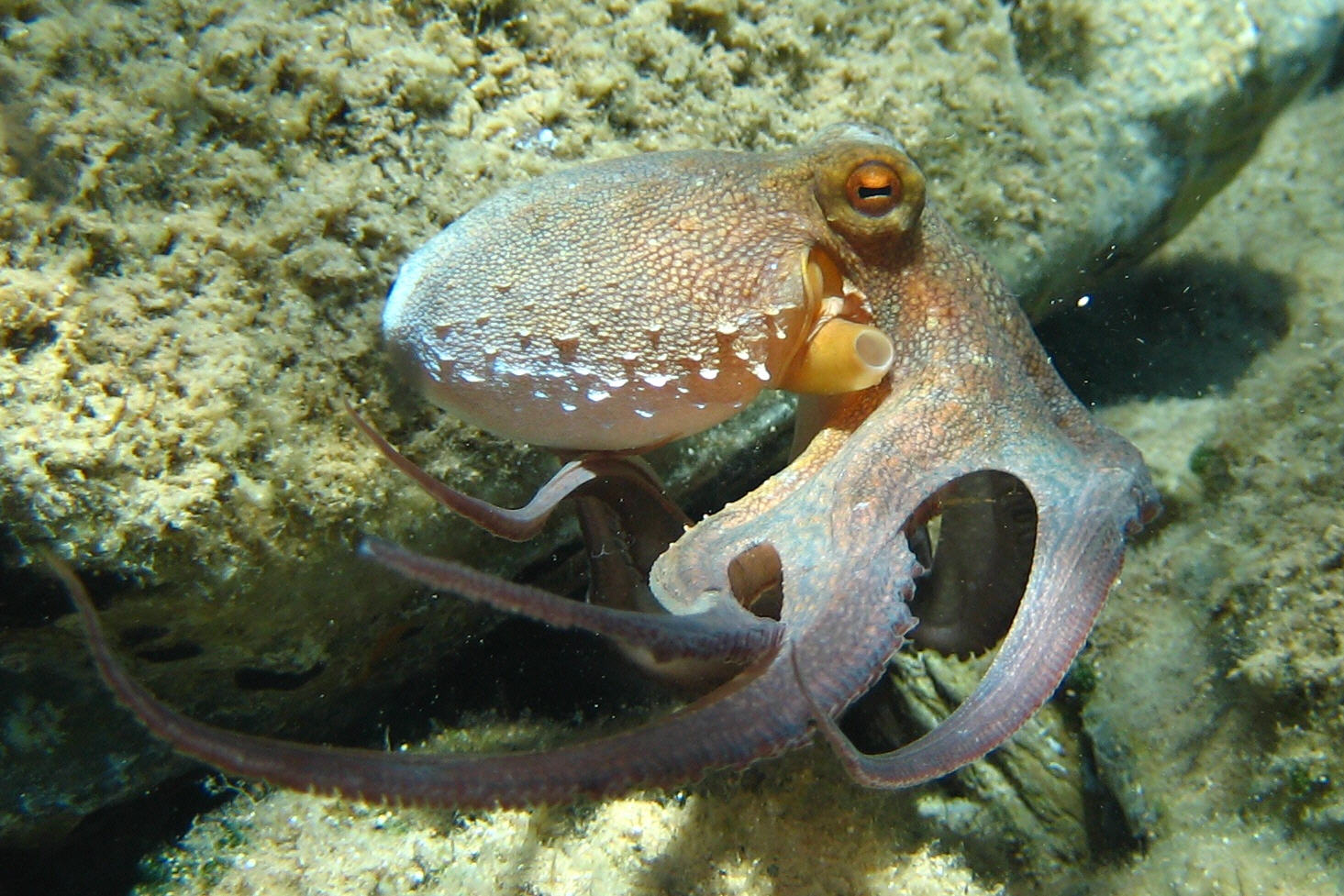
- A common octopus (Octopodiformes)

Scientific classification
- Kingdom: Animalia
- Phylum: Mollusca
- Class: Cephalopoda
- Subclass: Coleoidea; Bather, 1888
- Division: Neocoleoidea; Haas, 1997

Divisions
- See text

= Coleoidea =

Coleoidea Temporal range: Devonian or Carboniferous–recent

Subclass of cephalopods

Coleoidea or Dibranchiata is one of the two subclasses of cephalopod molluscs containing all the various taxa popularly thought of as "soft-bodied" or "shell-less" (i.e. octopus, squid and cuttlefish). Unlike its sister groups, the shelled †Ammonoidea and Nautiloidea, the coleoids have at most an internal shell called cuttlebone or gladius that is used for buoyancy or as muscle attachment. Some species, notably the incirrate octopuses (including commonly known varieties living in the shallows), have lost their internal shell altogether, while in some it has been replaced by a chitinous support structure.

== Evolution ==
The earliest certain coleoids are known from the Mississippian sub-period of the Carboniferous Period, about 330 million years ago. Some older fossils have been described from the Devonian, but paleontologists disagree about whether they are coleoids. Other cephalopods with internal shells, which could represent coleoids but may also denote the independent internalization of the shell, are known from the Silurian. It has been hypothesized that the Early–Middle Cambrian fossil Nectocaris represents a coleoid (or other cephalopod) that lost its shell, possibly secondarily, but it is later identified as relatives of modern chaetognaths (arrow worms).

By the Carboniferous, coleoids already had a diversity of forms, but the major radiation happened during the Tertiary. Although most of these groups are traditionally classified as belemnoids, the variation among them suggests that some are not closely related to belemnites.

=== Classification ===
The major divisions within Coleoidea are based upon the number of arms or tentacles and their structure. The extinct and most primitive form, the Belemnoidea, presumably had ten equally-sized arms in five pairs numbered as (counting from dorsal to ventral pairs) I, II, III, IV and V. More modern species either modified or lost a pair of arms; the superorder Decapodiformes (literally "ten arms" in greek) has arm pair IV modified into long tentacles with suckers generally only on the club-shaped distal end. Superorder Octopodiformes has modifications to arm pair II; it is significantly reduced and used only as a sensory filament in the Vampyromorphida, while species of Octopods (literally "eight arms") have totally lost that arm pair. The inner surface of the suckers (acetabulum) are reinforced with rigid sucker rings which are smooth in Sepiolida, have blunt teeth in Sepiida and sharply pointed teeth in Loliginidae and Oegopsida. The arms and/or tentacles of some oegopsid families have also evolved claw-like hooks, such as the hooked squid and the colossal squid.

Subordinate to Coleoidea is the division/cohort; Neocoleoidea, containing two extant groups: Decapodiformes (squid, cuttlefish, and relatives) and Octopodiformes (octopuses and the vampire squid). Species within this group exist in all major habitats in the ocean, in both the southern and northern polar regions, and from intertidal zones to the deep sea. Whilst conventionally held to be monophyletic and thus a "natural" clade, the only morphological character for the group is the presence of suckers, the discovery of these features in the belemnites suggests that Neocoleoidea may be paraphyletic: the definition of the group excludes species that are closer related to some Neocoleoids than these are to others within the group.

- Class Cephalopoda
  - Subclass Nautiloidea: nautilus
  - Subclass †Ammonoidea: ammonites
  - Subclass Coleoidea
    - Division †Belemnoidea: extinct belemnoids
      - Genus †Jeletzkya
      - Order †Hematitida
      - Order †Phragmoteuthida
      - Order †Donovaniconida
      - Order †Aulacocerida
      - Order †Belemnitida
      - Order †Diplobelida
    - Division Neocoleoidea
      - Superorder Decapodiformes
        - Order Bathyteuthida
        - Order Idiosepida – pygmy squid
        - Order Myopsida – coastal squid
        - Order Oegopsida – neritic squid
        - Order Sepiida – cuttlefish, bottletail, and bobtail squid
        - Order Spirulida – ram's horn squid
      - Superorder Octopodiformes
        - Family †Trachyteuthididae (incertae sedis)
        - Order Vampyromorphida: vampire squid
        - Order Octopoda: octopus
      - Superorder Palaeoteuthomorpha
        - Order †Boletzkyida
    - (uncertain order)
      - family †Ostenoteuthidae

== Reproduction ==
The majority of coleoid species are semelparous; dying after reproducing once, with males dying after insemination, and females dying after laying/brooding their clutch. A few species do not conform to this trend however; vampire squid, large Pacific striped octopus, and the West Atlantic scaled squid are thought to be iteroparous. This is somewhat comparable to extant nautilus, which are also iteroparous, being long-lived animals.

Some authors prefer to separate coleoid reproduction using other terms:

1. One-time reproduction (formerly semelparity); being the occurrence of "simultaneous terminal spawning" (terminal: occurring at the end of life). This group is characterized by synchronous ovulation (the ova all ripen prior to spawning), single-cycle spawning, and the absence of growth between egg batches.

2. Multiple reproductive events (formerly iteroparity). This category is divided further into:

- (i) polycyclic spawning; where single egg batches/clutches develop and are laid multiple times during the spawning season, with growth occurring between production of egg batches and breeding seasons and the gonads regenerate/ripen between clutches, e.g. Nautilus;
- (ii) multiple spawning; where multiple clutches of eggs develop simultaneously, which can be differentiated in the ovaries through their development stage (also known as group-synchronous ovulation). This method is defined by monocyclic spawning and the mother's growth between egg batches, e.g. Octopus chierchiae, Sthenoteuthis oualaniensis, Ommastrephes bartramii, and Dosidicus gigas;
- (iii) intermittent terminal spawning; with group-synchronous ovulation, monocyclic spawning, but the mother does not somatically grow between egg batches, e.g. Loligo vulgaris subspp., Loligo bleekeri, Loligo forbesii, Illex coindetii, Todaropsis eblanae, Todarodes angolensis, and most populations of Sepia officinalis;
- (iv) continuous spawning; where egg cells developed without any apparent "batches", with all stages of development potentially being present (or asynchronous ovulation), monocyclic spawning and growth between egg batches, e.g. Cirrothauma murrayi, Opisthoteuthis agassizii, Opisthoteuthis grimaldii and Grimpoteuthis glacialis, likely also includes Argonauta bottgeri, Argonauta hians, and Idiosepius pygmaeus.

=== Paralarva ===
Paralarvae (sing.: paralarva) are young cephalopods immediately after hatching, prior to the development of adult diagnostic features and before exhibiting a similar ecology to older members of the same species. The term was introduced by Richard E. Young and Robert F. Harman in 1988; the term "larva" had been used previously, but it fell out of use as the term implied a metamorphosis occurred where larval body parts are lost completely and adult body parts developed from some "rudiments" left in an embryonic state; in contrast, young cephalopods do not undergo metamorphosis, they mostly grow morphometrically, though as this process still transforms the animal significantly, being comparable to the development of fish young (referred to as larva), the term "paralarva" (para: near, almost; near-larva/almost larva) was thus coined.

Paralarvae have been observed only in members of the Octopoda and Teuthida (which constitutes the modern definition of Coleoidea). In the "iteroparous" species, the hatching of the paralarvae often heralds the death of the brooding mother. Paralarvae may be planktonic, or they may remain on the bottom (demersal zone). Planktonic paralarvae remain so for a time, feeding on small food items (such as detritus) until they start their transition into their adult habitat and niche; a young coleoid is termed a subadult when it displays the features diagnostic for species identification in the adult, without having to display size- or sex-specific features. An adult is thus an animal showing the diagnostic traits of its species, along with signs of sexual maturity.

Examples of paralarval cephalopods

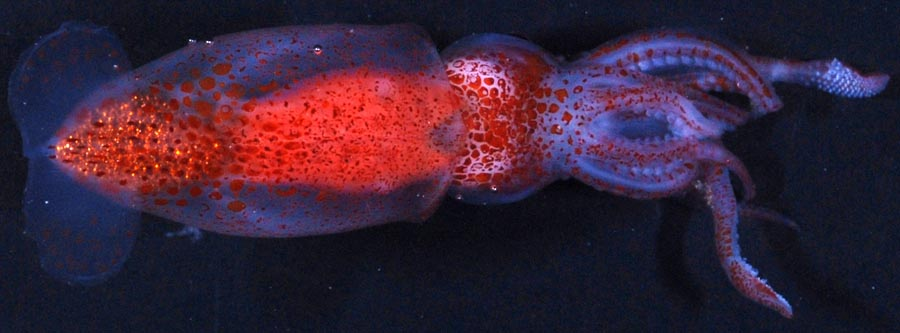
Psychroteuthis glacialis

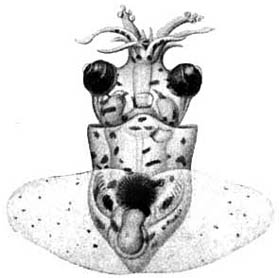
Taningia sp.

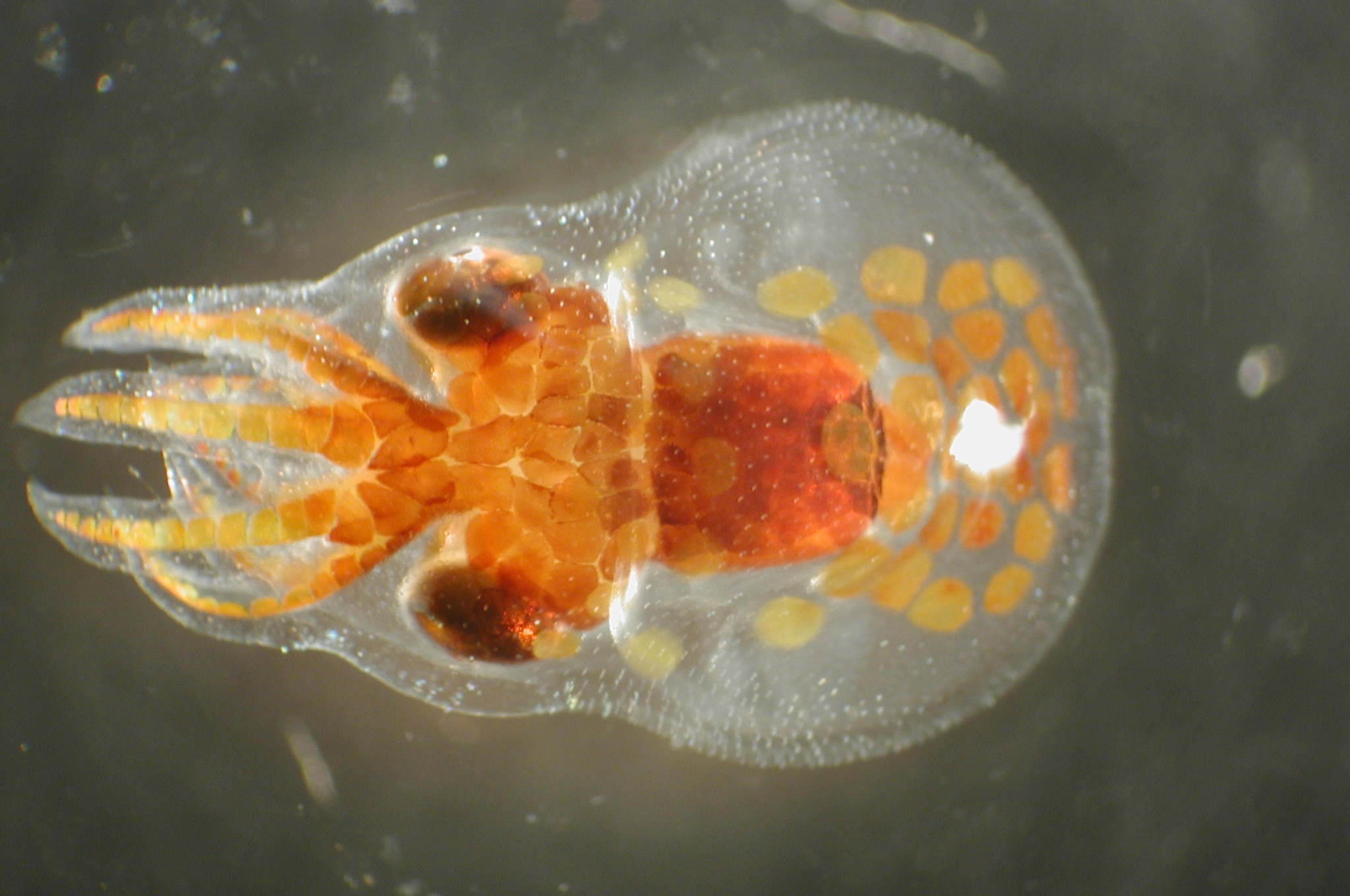
Octopus paralarva

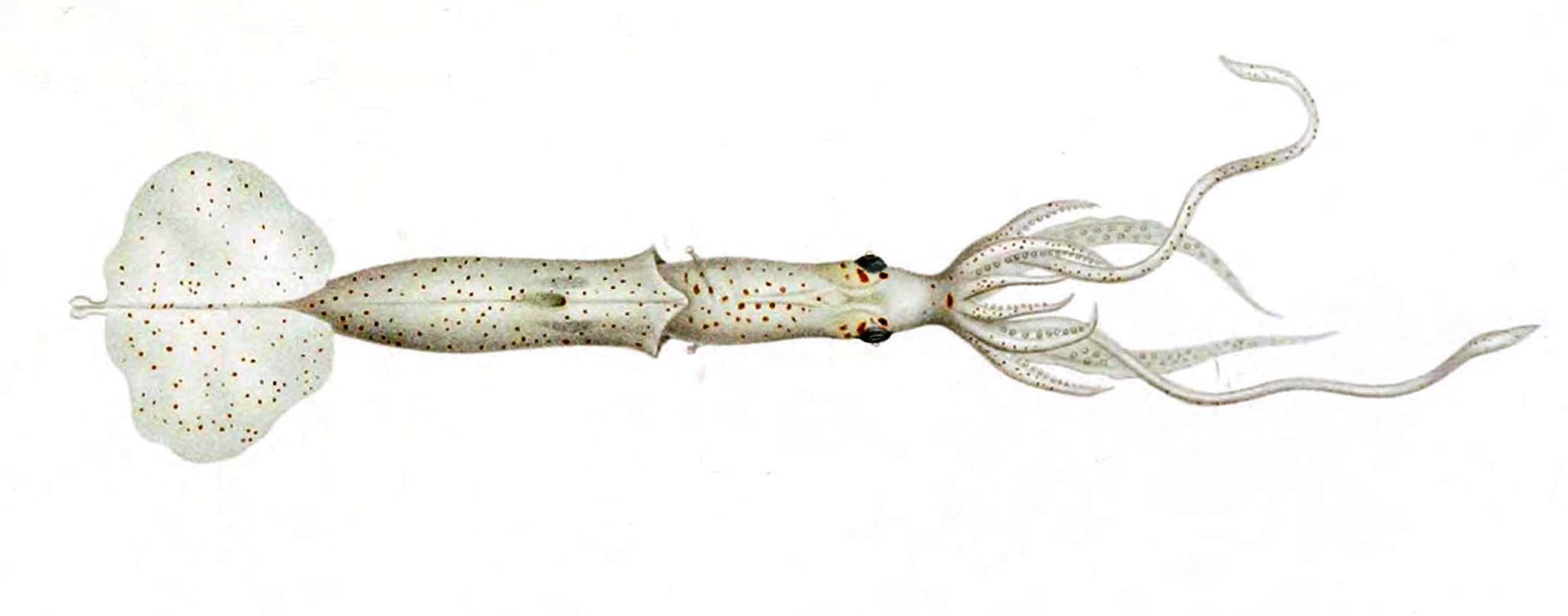
Grimalditeuthis bonplandi

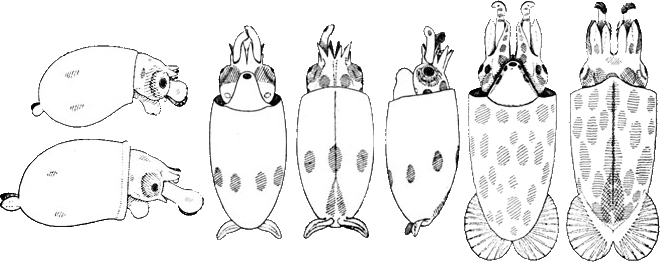
Chtenopteryx sicula paralarvae. Left: Two very young paralarvae. The circular tentacular clubs bear approximately 20 irregularly arranged suckers. Two chromatophores are present on each side of the mantle. Centre: Ventral, dorsal and side views of a more advanced paralarva. An equatorial circulet of seven large yellow-brown chromatophores is present on the mantle. Posteriorly the expanded vanes of the gladius are visible in the dorsal view. Right: Ventral and dorsal views of a very advanced paralarva.

== See also ==
- Aquaculture of squid
- Aquaculture of octopus
