= LPSO =

LPSO may refer to:

- Littlest Pet Shop Online, a virtual world based on the American toy franchise
- Leningrad Philharmonic Symphony Orchestra in Saint Petersburg, Russia
- Ponte de Sor Aerodrome in Portugal (ICAO code LPSO)
- Larger Pacific striped octopus
- Long-period stacking ordered, structures in metal alloys; see precipitation hardening
- Lafayette Parish Sheriff's Office, Lafayette Parish, Louisiana
