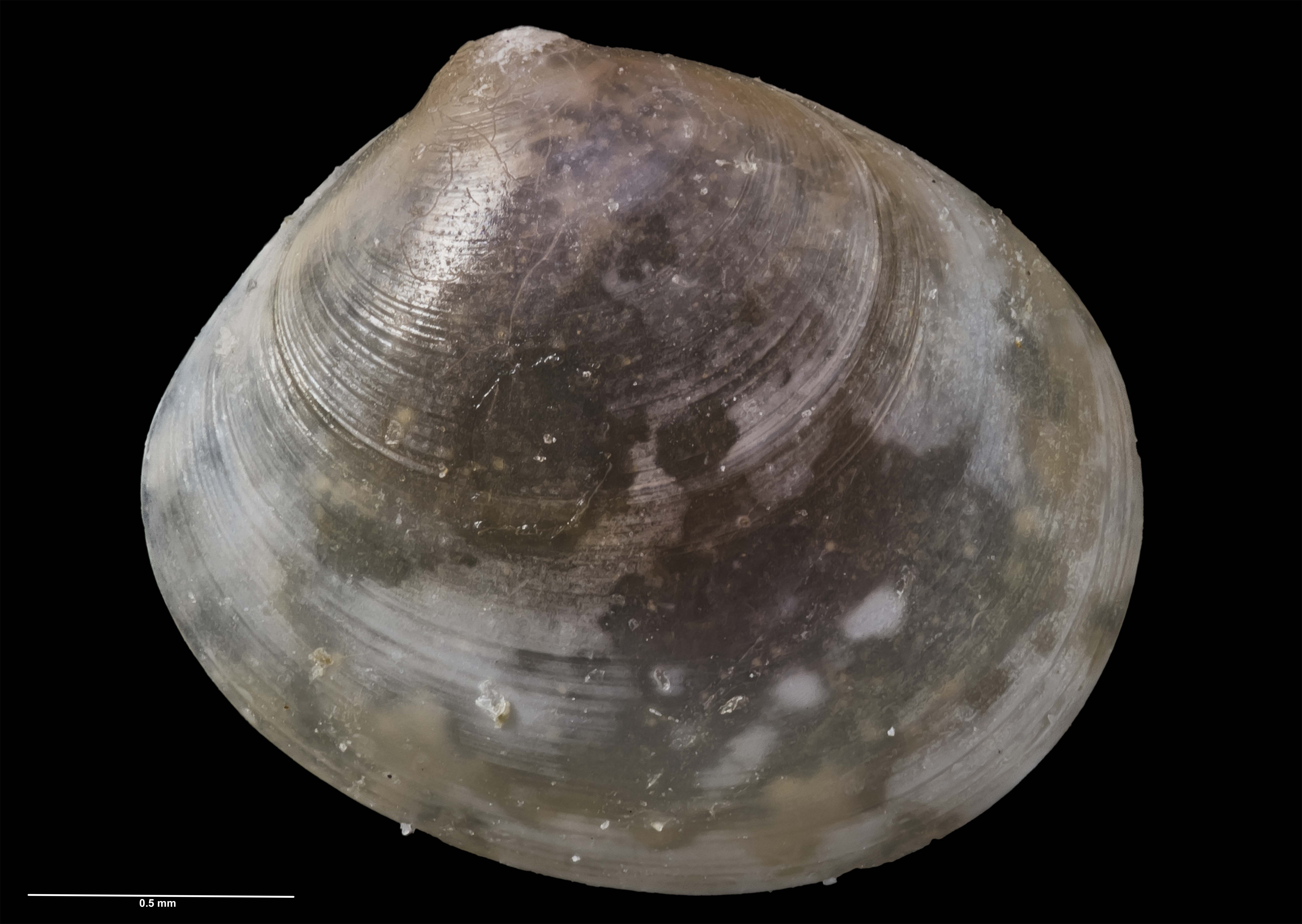
- Holotype from the Auckland War Memorial Museum

Scientific classification
- Kingdom: Animalia
- Phylum: Mollusca
- Class: Bivalvia
- Family: Cyamiidae
- Genus: Perrierina
- Species: P. insulana

Binomial name
- Perrierina insulana A. W. B. Powell, 1933

Synonyms
- Perrierina (Perrierina) insulana A. W. B. Powell, 1933

= Perrierina insulana =

Species of bivalve

Perrierina insulana is a species of bivalve, a marine mollusc in the family Cyamiidae. It is endemic to New Zealand, found in the waters surrounding the Chatham Islands and Stewart Island.

== Description ==
In the original description, Powell described the species as follows:

Shell minute, thin and fragile, ovate, equivalve and inequilateral. Beaks fairly prominent, with a moderately large rounded prodissoconch which is marked off from the post-embryonic part of the shell by a slightly raised thin rim. Sculpture of exceedingly fine and closely spaced concentric growth striae. Under a low power lens the surface appears to be smooth and glossy. Hinge plate narrow and long, typical. Right valve with two divergent cardinals, which are situated in front of the narrow oblique resilium. In addition there are four anterior and five posterior lamellae set obliquely on the distal parts of the hinge-plate. Left valve with three anterior cardinals, and the corresponding lamellae. Central cardinal rectangular, outer two narrow and slightly divergent. Valve margins smooth except for a few weak crenulations on the posterior section of the ventral edge. Colour creamy buff tinged with light brown towards the beaks. The hinge plate and provisions are stained reddish-brown, and there is a faint open pattern of a few zigzag lines, in light brown over the whole shell.

The shells of the species measure 1.6 mm (0.063 in) in height, 1.9 mm (0.075 in) in width, and a single valve has a thickness of 0.4 mm (0.016 in). It can be distinguished from P. ovata due to its more evenly ovate outline, and because the posterior of P. ovata is more broadly rounded and slightly subangled.

== Taxonomy ==
The species was first described by A. W. B. Powell in 1933. The holotype was collected by Powell himself in February 1933, from shell sand at a depth of 18 m (59 ft) off the coast of Owenga Beach in the Chatham Islands, and is held by the Auckland War Memorial Museum. The species is closely aligned with the fossil species P. ovata, and Powell in 1933 believed that P. insulana was a decedent species of P. ovata.

== Distribution and habitat ==
P. insulana is endemic to New Zealand, found in the waters of the Chatham Islands and Stewart Island at depths of between 0–55 m (0–180 ft). Previously, the species was thought to be endemic to the Chatham Islands.

== Gallery ==
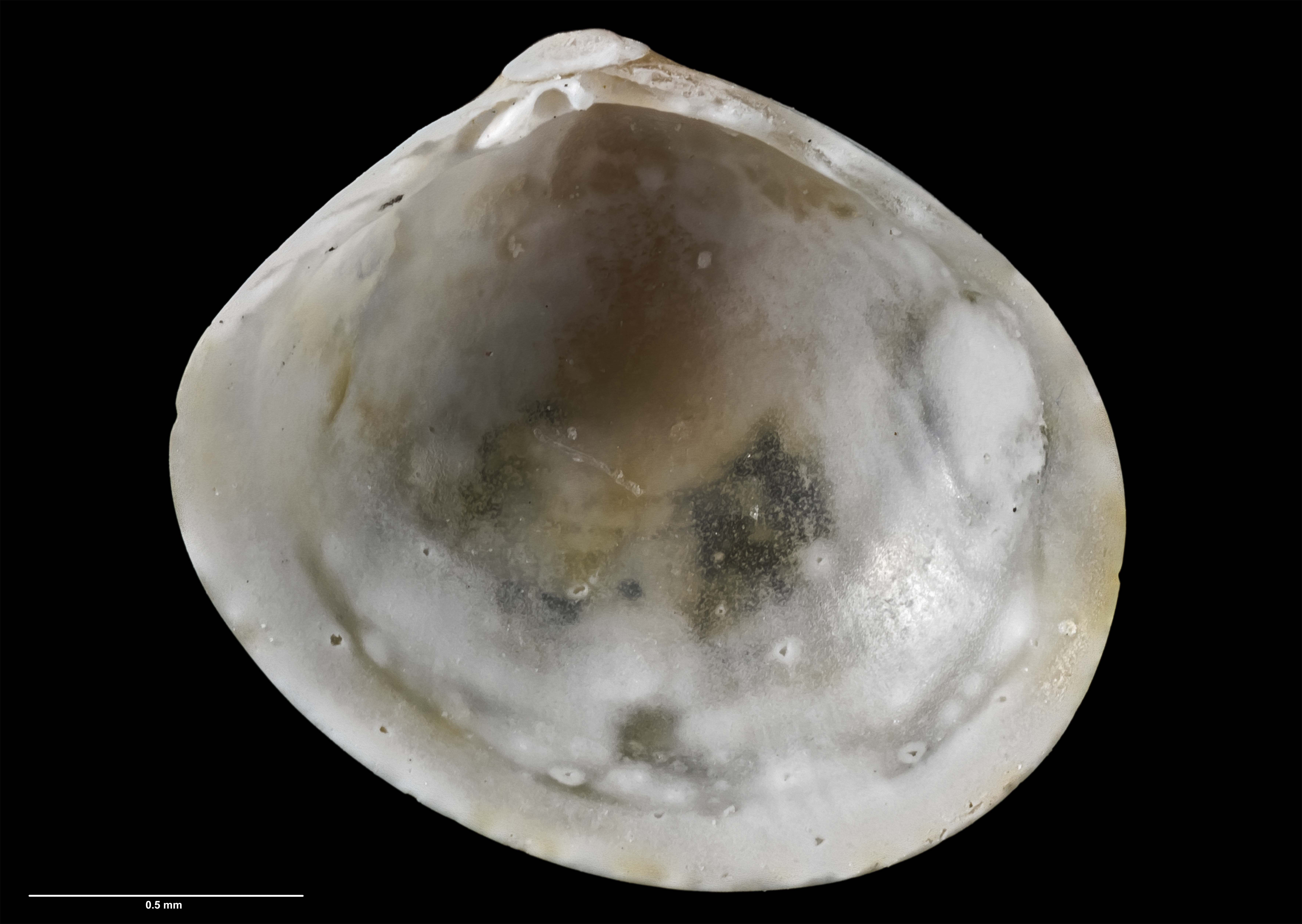
Holotype underside

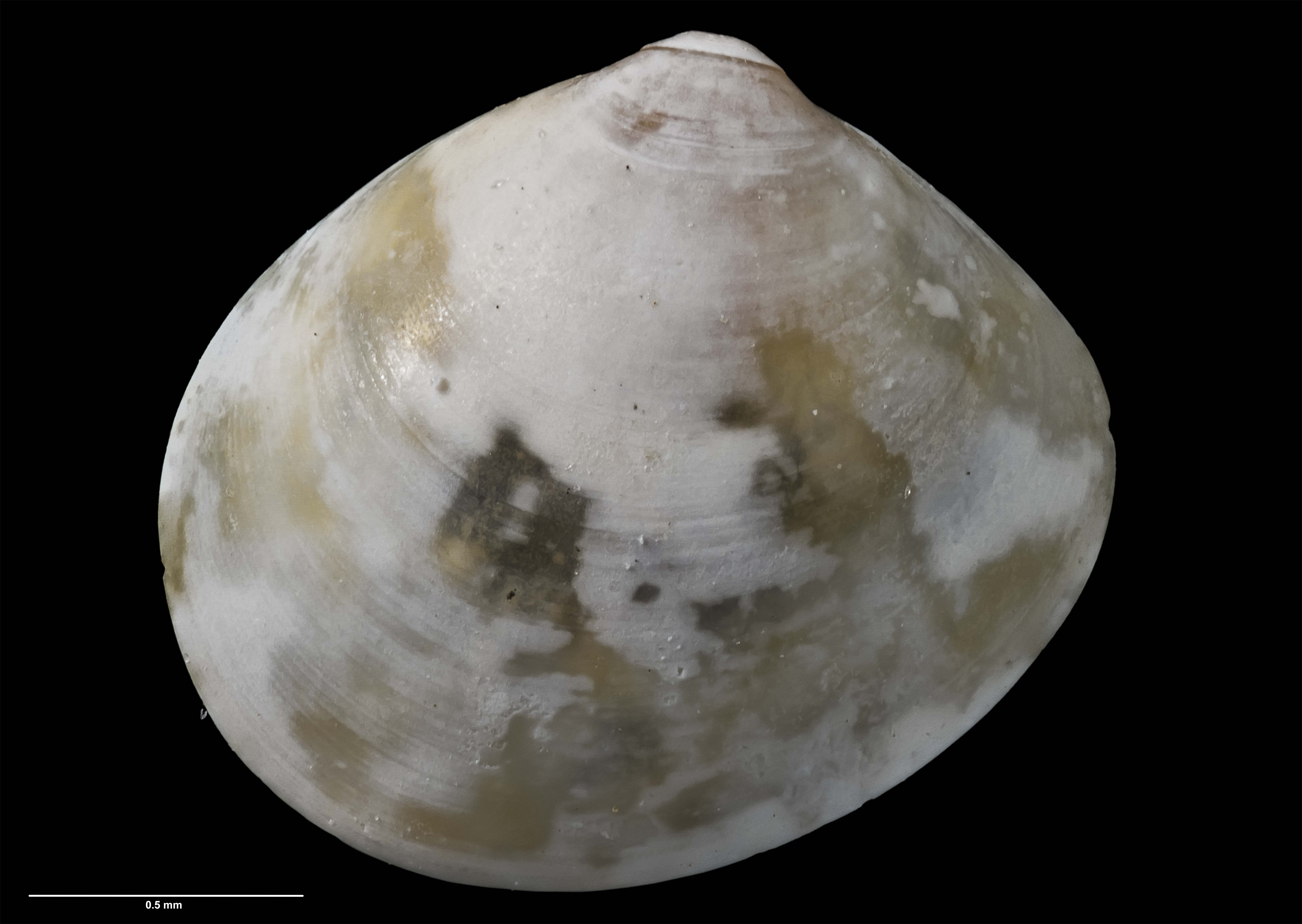
Holotype

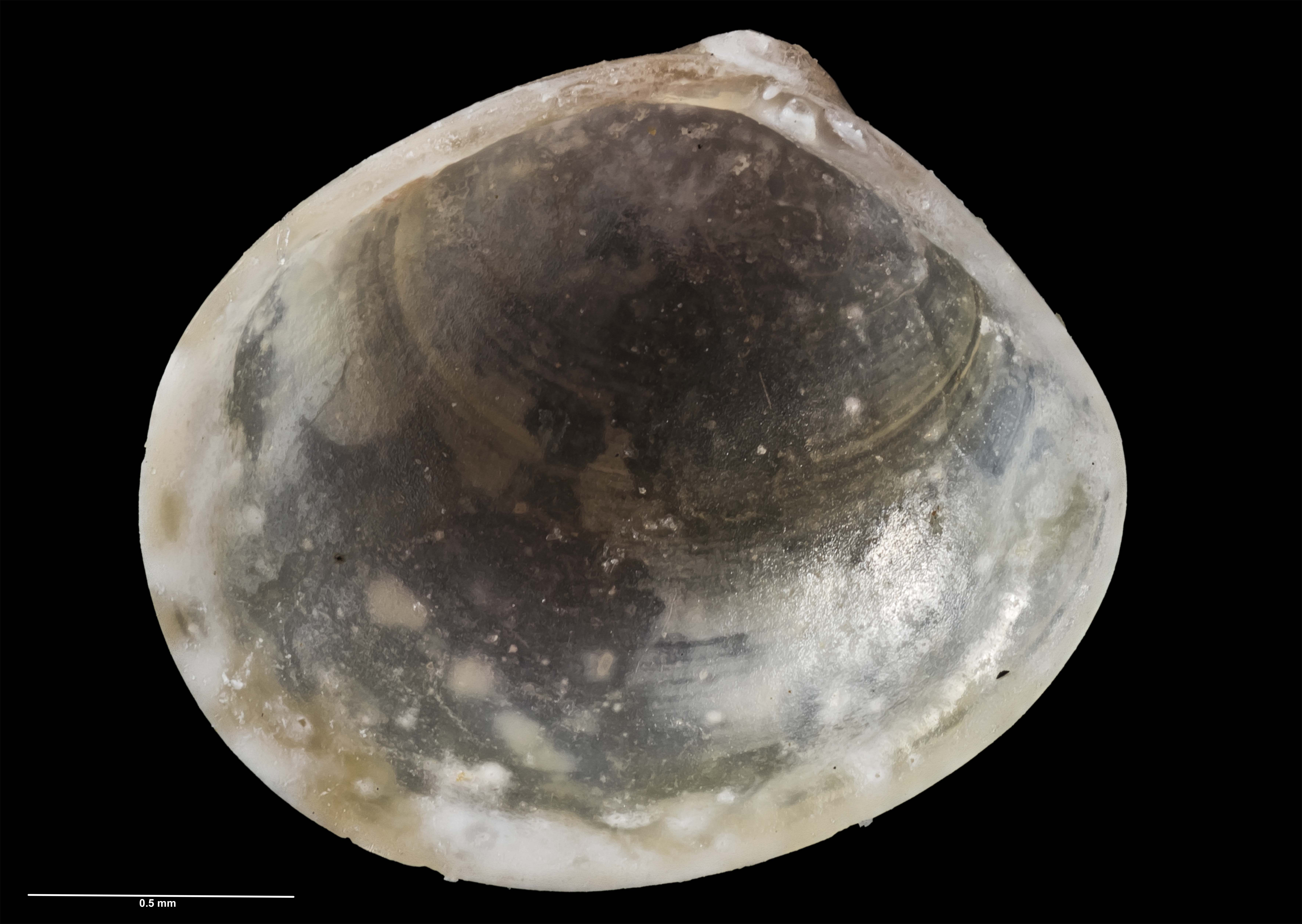
Holotype underside
