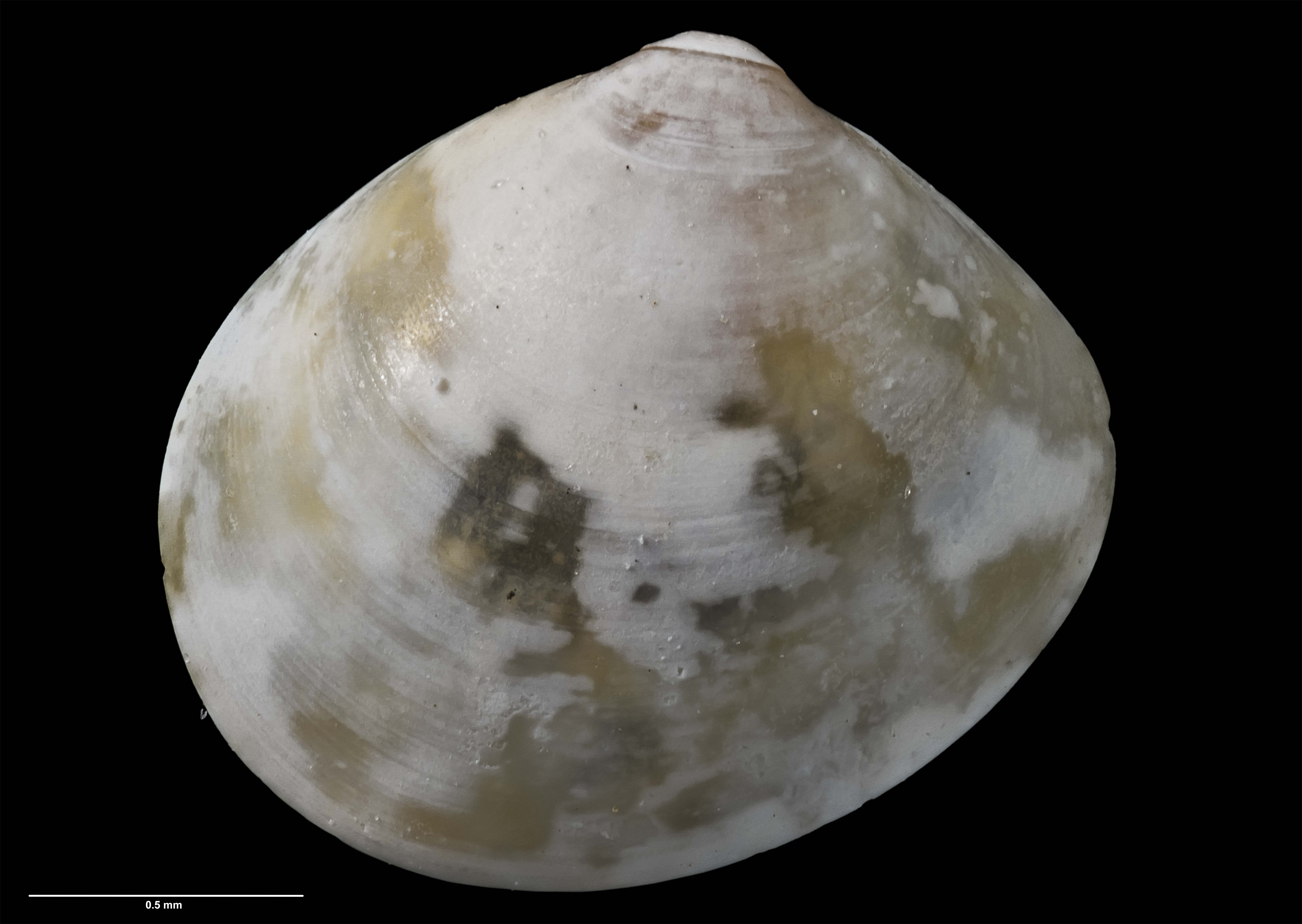
- Perrierina insulana

Scientific classification
- Kingdom: Animalia
- Phylum: Mollusca
- Class: Bivalvia
- Family: Cyamiidae
- Genus: Perrierina; F. Bernard, 1897

Type species
- Perrierina taxodonta F. Bernard, 1897

Synonyms
- Perrierina (Perrierina) F. Bernard, 1897

= Perrierina =

Perrierina Temporal range: 5.33–Recent Ma

Genus of bivalves

Perrierina is a genus of marine bivalve molluscs of the family Cyamiidae. Members of the genus are found in the waters of New Zealand, Australia and Antarctica.

== Description ==
Members of Perrierina have small, thin shells that are transversely-ovate and inequilateral (the anterior side being significantly shorter). The genus has a cap-shaped prodissoconch and shallow hinge plates, that have pairs of small cardinals in each valve.

== Taxonomy ==
The genus was first described in 1897 by Félix Bernard. The genus was originally monotypic, only including P. taxodonta, until 1928 when P. ovata was described.

== Distribution ==
Perrierina is primarily found in the waters of New Zealand, with additional species known to occur in south-eastern Australia and Antarctica. The earliest currently known fossils of the genus, Perrierina sola, date to the Opoitian stage of the Pliocene in New Zealand (approximately 5.33 million years ago), with similarly aged fossils found on King George Island of the South Shetland Islands.

== Species ==
Species within the genus Perrierina include:

- †Perrierina bensoni L. C. King, 1933
- Perrierina georgiana C. A. Fleming, 1948
- Perrierina insulana A. W. B. Powell, 1933
- Perrierina matai C. A. Fleming, 1948
- Perrierina mestayerae A. W. B. Powell, 1933
- †Perrierina ovata Marwick, 1928
- Perrierina perstriata C. A. Fleming, 1948
- †Perrierina sola Laws, 1936
- Perrierina subquadrangula Dell, 1952
- Perrierina substriata A. W. B. Powell, 1935
- Perrierina taxodonta F. Bernard, 1897
