= Palaeoteuthomorpha =

Palaeoteuthomorpha Temporal range: Devonian - ?

Scientific classification
- Domain: Eukaryota
- Kingdom: Animalia
- Phylum: Mollusca
- Class: Cephalopoda
- Subclass: Coleoidea
- Superorder: †Palaeoteuthomorpha; Bandel, Reitner,& Sturmer, 1983

Order of molluscs

Palaeoteuthomorpha is a superorder of primitive coleoid cephalopods, containing the Boletzkyida, characterized by an orthoceroid-like phragmocone early in ontogeny and a teuthid living chamber later in ontogeny. This contrasts with the later Teuthida which have a reduced living chamber (gladius) throughout.
