= Sportellidae =

Scientific classification
- Kingdom: Animalia
- Phylum: Mollusca
- Class: Bivalvia
- Superorder: Imparidentia
- Superfamily: Cyamioidea
- Family: Sportellidae; Dall, 1899

Genera
- See text.

Family of bivalves

Sportellidae is a family of marine bivalve molluscs of the superfamily Cyamioidea.

Sportellidae shells are of moderate size, equivalve and with an external ligament set on small nymphs. The hinge has one or two cardinal teeth and inconspicuous laterals.

== Genera and species ==
- † Angusticardo Cossmann, 1887
- Fabella Conrad, 1863
  - Fabella constricta (Conrad, 1841)
  - Fabella pilsbryi (Dall, 1899)
  - Fabella stearnsii (Dall, 1899)
- Sportella Deshayes, 1858
