= Boletzkyida =

Boletzkyida Temporal range: Early Devonian

Scientific classification
- Domain: Eukaryota
- Kingdom: Animalia
- Phylum: Mollusca
- Class: Cephalopoda
- Superorder: †Palaeoteuthomorpha
- Order: †Boletzkyida; Bandel et al., 1983

Families
- †Boletzkyidae; †Naefiteuthidae

Extinct order of molluscs

Boletzkyida is a primitive order of teuthid coleoid cephalopod: the boletzkyids are thought to be the earliest forms of coleoid cephalopods, and appear to form a link between nautiloid orthocerids and more advanced coleoids. Boletzkyida was named and described by Bandel, Reitner, and Sturmer in 1983 (B.R.&S) from specimens found in the Lower Devonian black slate ("Hunsrück Slate") in Germany.

== Taxonomy ==
Bandel, et al (1983) divided the Boletzkyida into two, not too dissimilar families, each based on a single genus. They are the Boletzkyidae based on the genus Boletzkya and the Naefiteuthidae based on the genus Naefiteuthis. The main difference between Boletzkya and Naefiteuthis is the length of the phragmocone at which time the living chamber becomes gladius-like and dominates the shell.

== Ontogeny ==
Boletzkyd shells grew to as long as 16 cm. The juvenile portion is a phragmocone that closely resembles that of Silurian orthocerid Michelinoceras with a spherical protoconch (first chamber) and tubular living (or body) chamber with a simple rounded aperture. In the early juvenile stage the living chamber is about as long as the chambered phragmocone. Later in the juvenile stage the living chamber grows proportionally longer and develops a median dorsal and two lateral keels and has an aperture with a receded ventral or lower lip (B.R.&S). At full maturity the narrowly expanding, keeled living chamber dominates all but the first few centimeters of shell and is reminiscent of the gladii or pens of later squid.

Boletzkya probably hatched with a shell only about 3–4 mm long and was at least in outward appearance a miniature adult. With two septa the living chamber is as long as 5 mm. Later in the juvenile stage the phragmocone increased in size relative to the living chamber until, at an overall length of about 8 mm, it reached equal length. Shortly after this the dorsal median keel first appeared and the inner (ventral) apertural lip became retarded while the outer (dorsal) lip grows into a gladius-like proostracum (B.R.&S). Once started, the "gladius" grew rapidly. At a phragmocone of slightly more than 4 mm it reached a length of more than 3 times (15 mm). A 12–13 mm phragmocone had a "gladius" of 70 mm, and with only two more mm of phragmocone (15 mm) a "gladius" of 100 mm (B.R.&S).

Naefiteuthis is similar to Boletzkya and hatched at about the same size, except that it has almost no phragmocone and the keeled gladius-like living chamber developed almost immediately. Also the living chamber in Naefiteuthis expanded more rapidly than in Boletzkya, with an apical angle of 20–25 degrees versus only 5–10 degrees for Boletzkya. Naefiteuthis seems to have been more stout and perhaps more robust than Boletzkya which was apparently quite streamlined. Like Boletzkya, the Naefiteuthis hatchling was most likely a miniature adult.

== Affinity ==
Nothing is known directly of the boletzkyid animal but judging from its most likely michelinocerid ancestors (B.R.&S) and their obvious squid descendants that it had 10 arms. A Michelinoceras from the Silurian of Bolivia was found (Mehl 1984) with imprints showing it had 10 arms and a distantly related Treptoceas (Orthonybyoceras) from the Upper Ordovician near Cincinnati, Ohio were found with indications it, too, had 10 arms (Flower 1955). The 10 arms of squid (8 arms and 2 tentacles) are well known.

Boletzkyida brings the origin of the [Neo?]Coleoidea near simultaneous with that of the Ammonoidea and may put their ancestry directly in the nautiloid Orthocerida.

On another view... the group's taxonomic position is uncertain, with a possible affinity with the Dibranchiata [=Coleoidea], conceivably at a stem-group level, which would place its divergence as before the ammonoids had diverged from other coleoids.
