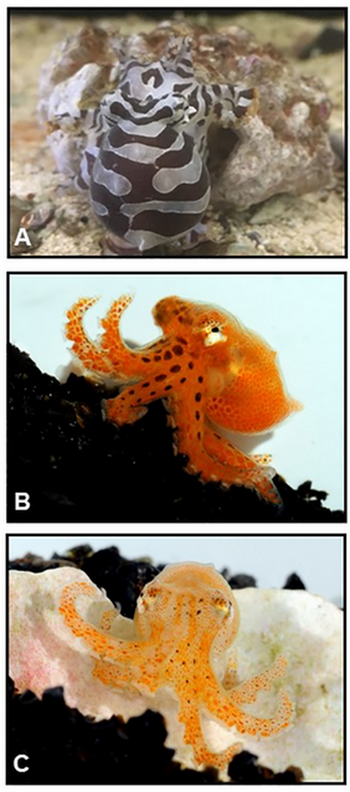
- Octopus chierchiae of different ages (A) One-year-old O. chierchiae adult. (B) One-day-old O. chierchiae hatchling. (C) Five-day-old O. chierchiae hatchling already displaying a developing stripe configuration.

Conservation status
- Data Deficient (IUCN 3.1)

Scientific classification
- Kingdom: Animalia
- Phylum: Mollusca
- Class: Cephalopoda
- Order: Octopoda
- Family: Octopodidae
- Genus: Octopus
- Species: O. chierchiae

Binomial name
- Octopus chierchiae Jatta, 1889

= Octopus chierchiae =

Lesser Pacific striped octopus

Species of mollusc

Octopus chierchiae, commonly known as the lesser Pacific striped octopus or pygmy zebra octopus, is a small marine cephalopod belonging to the Octopodidae family and the Octopus genus. O. chierchiae is native to the eastern tropical Pacific, specifically along the coasts of Panama and Costa Rica, where it inhabits shallow benthic environments including rubble, rocky crevices, and sandy substrates from the intertidal zone to depths of about 100 m. O. chierchiae is characterized by its distinctive dark-and-light banding patterns, which are individually unique and remain fixed throughout its lifespan. O. chierchiae, is iteroparous, meaning it has multiple reproductive events over the course of its life. This is different from most octopus species, which are semelparous and die after reproducing once. These characteristics have led to its emergence as a model organism in laboratory research. Although increasingly studied in captivity, the species' wild population is poorly understood and is currently listed by the International Union for Conservation of Nature (IUCN) as Data Deficient.

== Description ==
Juvenile O. chierchiae hatch at approximately 3.5 mm mantle length and typically lack the species' characteristic dark-and-light striped pattern, which becomes visible with magnification around five days post-hatching. Under favorable conditions, juveniles reach adult size in about 250–300 days. Adult O. chierchiae have a mantle length of about 20 mm—comparable to the size of a grape—and exhibit bold, individually unique stripe patterns across the mantle and arms that remain stable throughout life. The largest mantle length recorded for the species is approximately 25 mm.

Sexually mature males can be identified by a modified third right arm, the hectocotylus, which lacks suckers and is used to transfer spermatophores during mating; males may also display a tasseling behavior characterized by rapid shaking of the arm tips. O. chierchiae generally reach sexual maturity at around six months of age. Unlike most octopus species, which are semelparous, O. chierchiae are iteroparous and can lay multiple clutches of eggs, up to twelve clutches in their reproductive life stage, at intervals of approximately 30 to 90 days.

== Distribution and habitat ==
O. chierchiae is native to the eastern tropical Pacific– specifically, the central Pacific coast of the Americas, most notably Panama and Costa Rica. Its natural habitat consists of benthic, shallow coastal environments, including intertidal to shallow subtidal zones with rocks, shells, rubble, and crevices where it can hide.

Given the limited field observations on record, the full extent of its wild distribution and population density remains incomplete.

== Behavior and ecology ==
In both natural and captive environments, O. chierchiae behaves as a typical benthic predator and crevice-dweller, feeding on small crustaceans and other invertebrates typical of other octopus species. O. chierchiae uses the shells, rubble, and rock crevices found in its environment as shelter. Contrary to the typical solitary nature of most octopus species, O. chierchiae tolerates relatively high-density communities in captivity, which is highly advantageous for research and husbandry. In addition, O. chierchiae's small size and comparatively small resource requirements offer advantages for laboratory use over other octopus species.

== Life cycle and reproduction ==
Hatchlings emerge with a mantle length of ~3.5 mm and, in ~250-300 days, will grow to adulthood with a mantle size of 20-30 mm. Sexual maturity occurs at around 6 months of age. Females have been observed to lay successive clutches approximately every 30-90 days under captive conditions. Hatchlings will emerge immediately as juveniles (I.e., no larval stage). Mating involves the male using his hectocotylus to transfer spermatophores to the female's mantle cavity.

A defining feature of O. chierchiae is its iteroparity, the capacity to produce multiple clutches of eggs over its lifespan. The O. chierchiae is capable of laying up to twelve clutches in its lifetime, averaging 30-90 days between each clutch, making it well-suited for multi-generational laboratory studies and controlled breeding.

== See also ==
- Larger Pacific striped octopus, a social species of octopus. These organisms are usually found near low intertidal zones, approximately 40 meters from the Gulf of California to Colombia.
