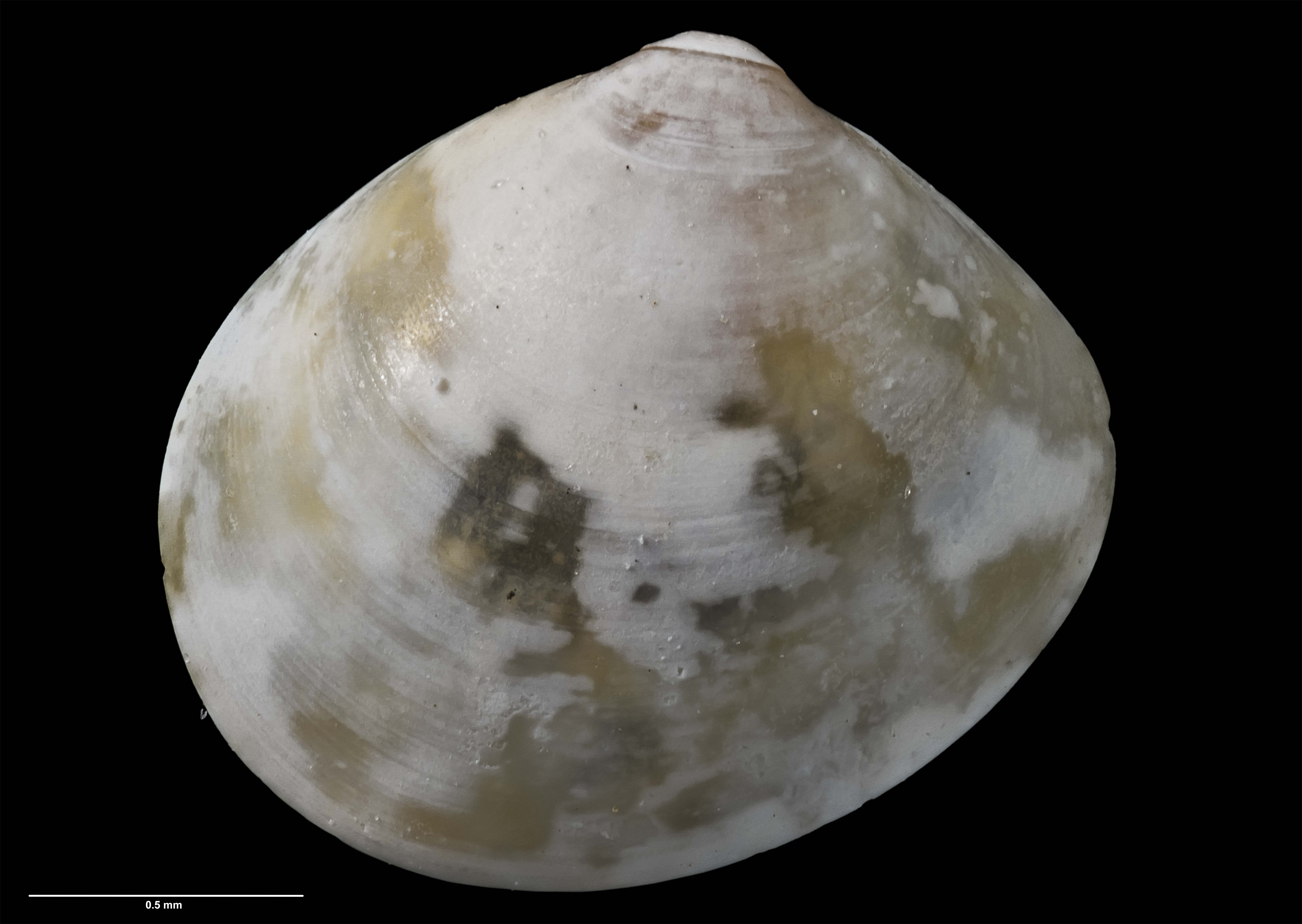
- Perrierina insulana

Scientific classification
- Kingdom: Animalia
- Phylum: Mollusca
- Class: Bivalvia
- Superorder: Imparidentia
- Superfamily: Cyamioidea
- Family: Cyamiidae; Philippi, 1845

Genera
- See text.

Synonyms
- Gaimardiidae

= Cyamiidae =

Family of bivalves

Cyamiidae is a family of marine bivalve clams of the superfamily Cyamioidea.

== Genera ==
Genera in the family Cyamiidae:

- Cyamium Philippi, 1845
- Gaimardia Gould, 1852
- Kidderia Dall, 1876
- Perrierina Bernard, 1897
