= Hematitida =

Hematitida Temporal range: Carboniferous

Scientific classification
- Kingdom: Animalia
- Phylum: Mollusca
- Class: Cephalopoda
- Superorder: †Belemnoidea
- Order: †Hematitida; Doguzhaeva et al., 2002

Family and genera
- Hematitidae: Hematites; Bactritimimus; Paleoconus

Extinct order of molluscs

Hematitida is a group of coleoid cephalopods known from the early Carboniferous Period. They are the oldest definite coleoids, although there are controversial claims for even older coleoids from the Devonian. Fossil hematitidans have so far been found only in Arkansas and Utah of the United States. The only family described so far is Hematitidae.

== Characteristics ==
Some features shared by hematitidans include

- a short rostrum, made of aragonite and organic material, and bearing ridges
- a short living chamber, only 1.5 to 2 times the length of the last chamber of the phragmocone
- a spherical protoconch
- a narrow, straight phragmocone
- a multi-layered conotheca - the outer wall of the phragmocone
- a narrow, ventral siphuncle

== Classification ==
The classification for this group comes from Doguzhaeva et al. 2003

Order Hematitida Doguzhaeva, Mapes, & Mutvei, 2002

- Family Hematitidae Gustomesov 1976
  - Hematites Flower & Gordon 1959 - type genus
  - Bactritimimus Flower & Gordon, 1959
  - Paleoconus Flower & Gordon, 1959
