= Cyamioidea =

Scientific classification
- Kingdom: Animalia
- Phylum: Mollusca
- Class: Bivalvia
- Superorder: Imparidentia
- Superfamily: Cyamioidea; Sars, 1878

Superfamily of bivalves

Cyamioidea is a superfamily of bivalve mollusks in the superorder of Imparidentia. It was described by Sars in 1878. There is currently no widespread consensus as to which taxa belong in Cyamioidea, but it currently contains the families of Cyamiidae, Gaimardiidae, and Sportellidae. The group is suspected to be polyphyletic.
