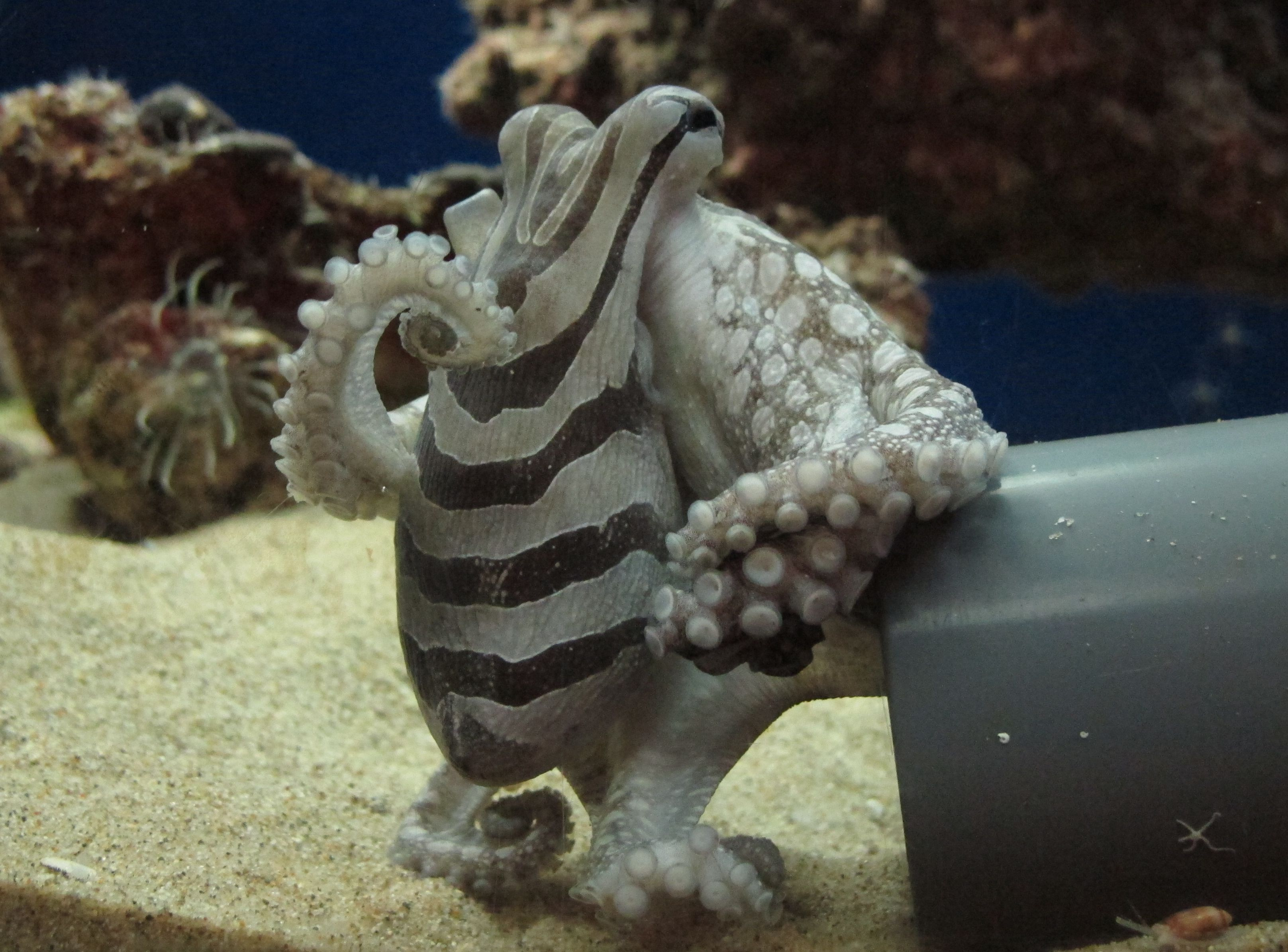

Scientific classification
- Kingdom: Animalia
- Phylum: Mollusca
- Class: Cephalopoda
- Order: Octopoda
- Family: Octopodidae
- Genus: Octopus
- Subgenus: Octopus
- Species: O. sp.

Binomial name
- Octopus sp.

= Larger Pacific striped octopus =

Species of octopus

The larger Pacific striped octopus (LPSO), or Harlequin octopus, is a species of octopus known for its intelligence and gregarious nature. The species was first documented in the 1970s and, being fairly new to scientific observation, has yet to be scientifically described. Because of this, LPSO has no official scientific name. Unlike other octopus species which are normally solitary, the LPSO has been reported as forming groups of up to 40 individuals. While most octopuses are cannibalistic and have to exercise extreme caution while mating, these octopuses mate with their ventral sides touching, pressing their beaks and suckers together in an intimate embrace. The LPSO has presented many behaviors that differ from most species of octopus, including intimate mating behaviors, formation of social communities, unusual hunting behavior, and the ability to reproduce multiple times throughout their life. The LPSO has been found to favor the tropical waters of the Eastern Pacific.

== Appearance ==
LPSO exhibits three main body color patterns that include completely pale, completely dark brown, and a dark brown and white pattern that is referred to as "stripe-bar-spot". When displaying the stripe-bar-spot body color pattern, LPSO is observed to have bar and stripe patterns that alternate between brown and white across its head and mantle, and dark brown with white spots over its arm, crown, and arms. The pattern can serve as a unique identifier as it varies among individuals. Though LPSO has similar body color patterns to other octopuses like Octopus chierchiae, Octopus zonatus, Abdopus spp., Thaumoctopus mimicus, and Wunderpus photogenicus, the body patterns it exhibits are unique to the species.

== Habitat and distribution ==
LPSO has been documented in many locations throughout the tropics of the Eastern Pacific. Specimens have been located in the Bay of Panama, Panama, Guatemala, Magdelena Bay, Baja Sur, Mexico, the northern Pacific coast of Colombia, and Nicaragua. LPSO seems to prefer denning in areas with soft muddy substrates or a mix of mud and sand, ranging in depth from 7m to 100m. The species has also been observed to form colonies of up to 40 close-living individuals. These colonies of LPSO construct dens within 1m of one another and live in the same general area for the span of their lives.

== Mating ==
LPSO is known in particular for its display of mating behaviors that are vastly different from most octopus species. While most octopuses use either "distance mating" (when the male places his hectocotylus into the female's mantle from a safe distance) or a mounting position, LPSO uses a more intimate approach. Typically, a brooding female that is ready to mate exhibits an entirely pale body color pattern while the male exhibits a high contrast stripe-bar-spot body color pattern. Once the male and female LPSO decide to mate, they join in a beak-to-beak position, embracing in an entanglement of arms. Unlike some species of octopus, female LPSO are not cannibalistic during mating and are rather gentle, leaving only surface level sucker marks as a result of the beak-to-beak embrace.

Pair bonding has been observed in LPSO through behaviors such as food and den sharing.

== Brooding ==
Unlike most octopus species, LPSO can spawn multiple times throughout the span of their life. Eggs are laid in pairs within the den and the female tends to them until they hatch, running the tips of her arms over them to maintain the health of the eggs.

Once hatched from the egg, the offspring are pelagic until adulthood.

== Hunting ==
LPSO has been observed to prey upon a variety of shellfish including shrimp, stomatopods, crabs, and bivalves. They use hunting methods of stalking, chasing, and ambush depending on the prey item in question. When eating bivalves, smaller prey is either crushed or pulled apart, while holes are drilled into larger prey. When hunting shrimp, LPSO carefully extends its arm, suckers positioned outward, to touch and capture the shrimp. When hunting crabs, LPSO uses an ambush method, pouncing directly onto the crab for capture.

== Lifespan ==
LPSO live about two years.

Like most octopus species, LPSO goes through a stage of senescence, which marks the approach of death. Senescence in LPSO has been observed to be longer for females and shorter for males. After the first signs of senescence, males will typically last 1 to 2 weeks before death, while females will typically last between 2 and 4 months.
