= List of the Mesozoic life of Colorado =

This list of the Mesozoic life of Colorado contains the various prehistoric life-forms whose fossilized remains have been reported from within the US state of Colorado and are between 252.17 and 66 million years of age.

== A ==
- †Acanthichnus – tentative report
- Acila
  - †Acila chicotana
- Acmaea
  - †Acmaea genettae – type locality for species
- †Adocus
- †Albanerpeton
  - †Albanerpeton nexuosus
- †Albertosaurus – tentative report
- †Allantodiopsis
  - †Allantodiopsis erosa
  - †Allantodiopsis JC018 – informal
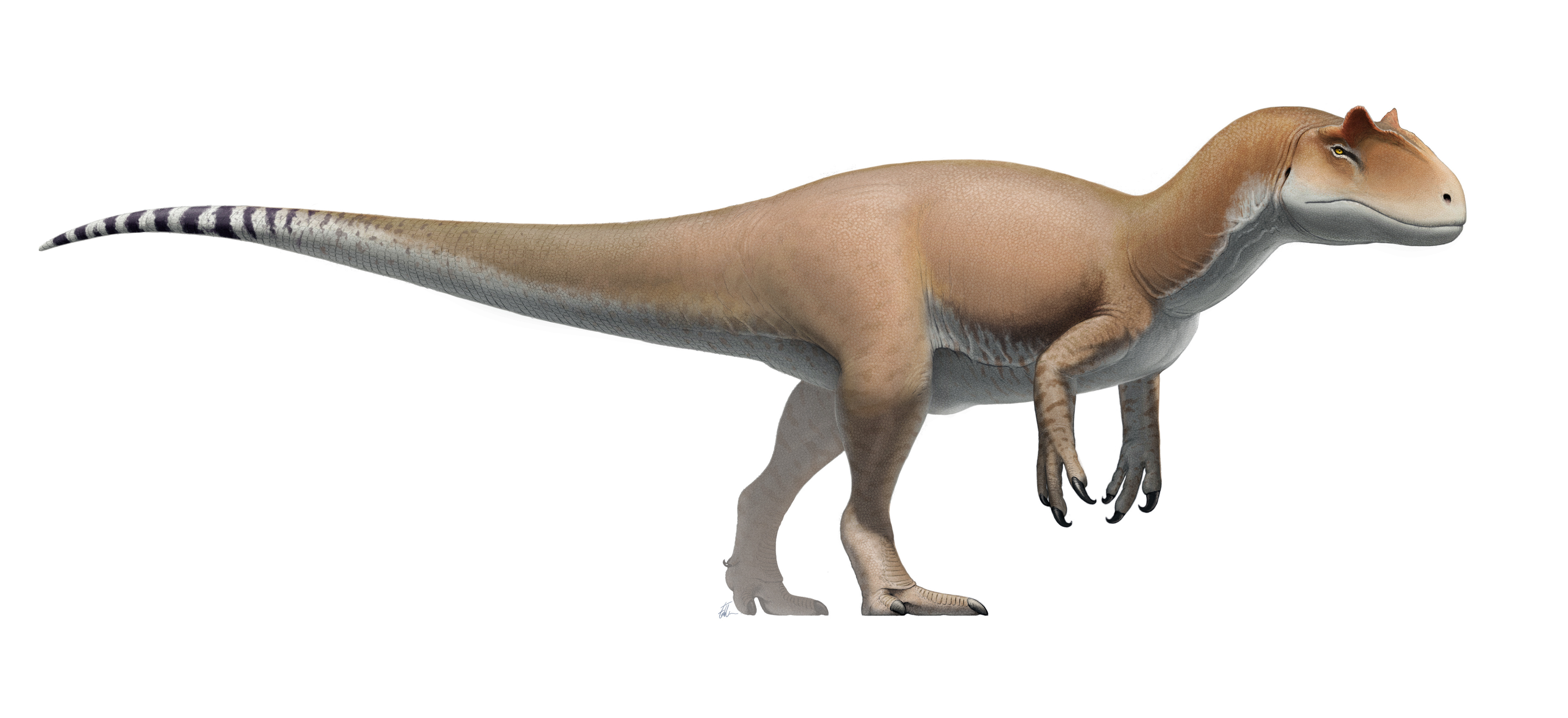
- Life restoration of the Late Jurassic theropod dinosaur Allosaurus
  †Allosaurus – type locality for genus
  - †Allosaurus fragilis – type locality for species
  - †Allosaurus lucasi – type locality for species
- †Amblotherium – type locality for genus
  - †Amblotherium gracilis
- Amia
- †Amphicoelias – type locality for genus
  - †Amphicoelias altus – type locality for species
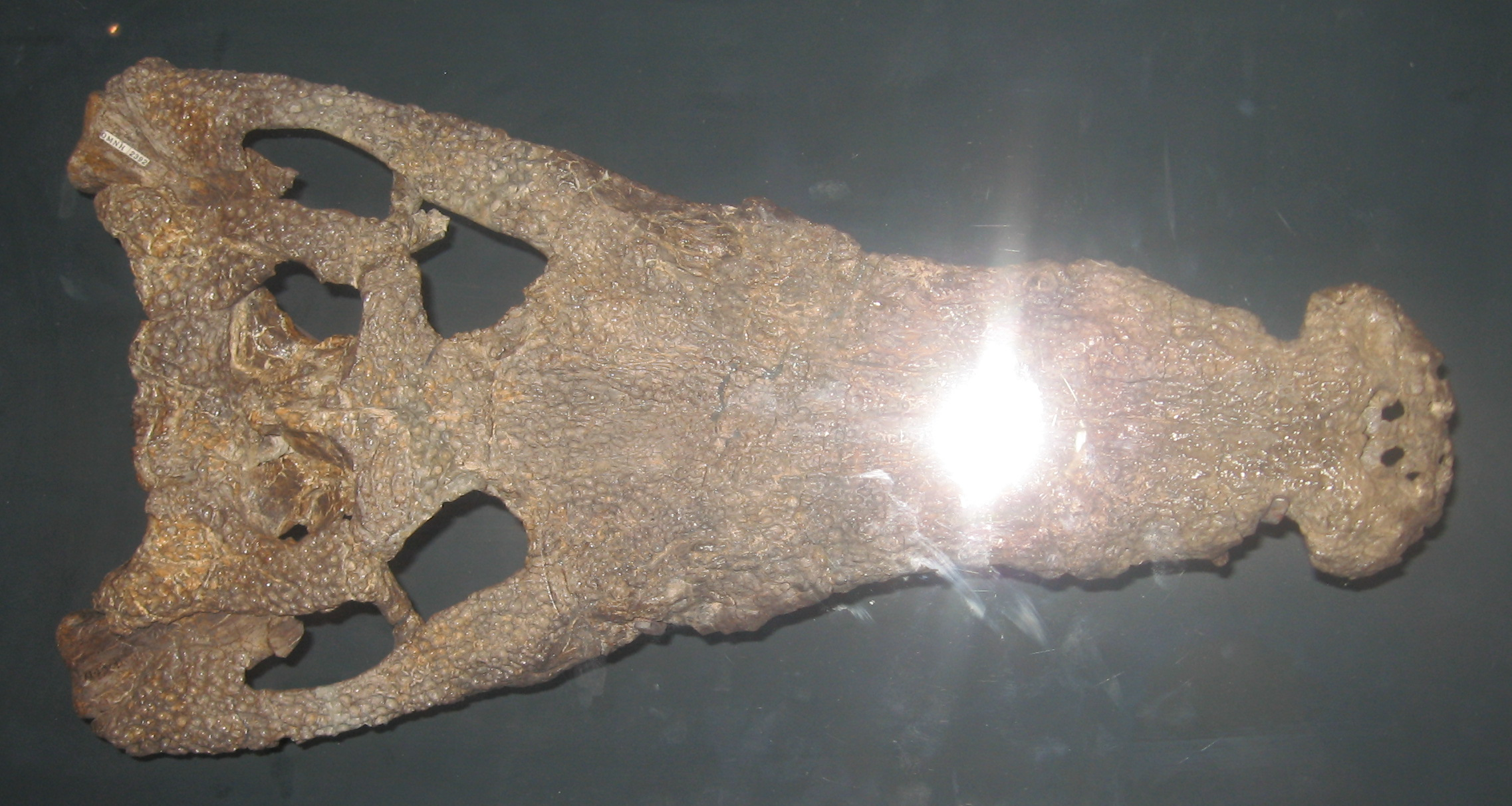
- Fossilized skull of the Late Jurassic crocodile relative Amphicotylus
  †Amphicotylus
  - †Amphicotylus lucasii – type locality for species
- †Amplovalvata
  - †Amplovalvata scabrida
- †Anaklinoceras
  - †Anaklinoceras minutum – type locality for species
  - †Anaklinoceras reflexum
- †Anisoceras
  - †Anisoceras plicatilis
- †Anisomyon
  - †Anisomyon centrale
- †Anomia
  - †Anomia subquadrata
  - †Anomia tellinoides
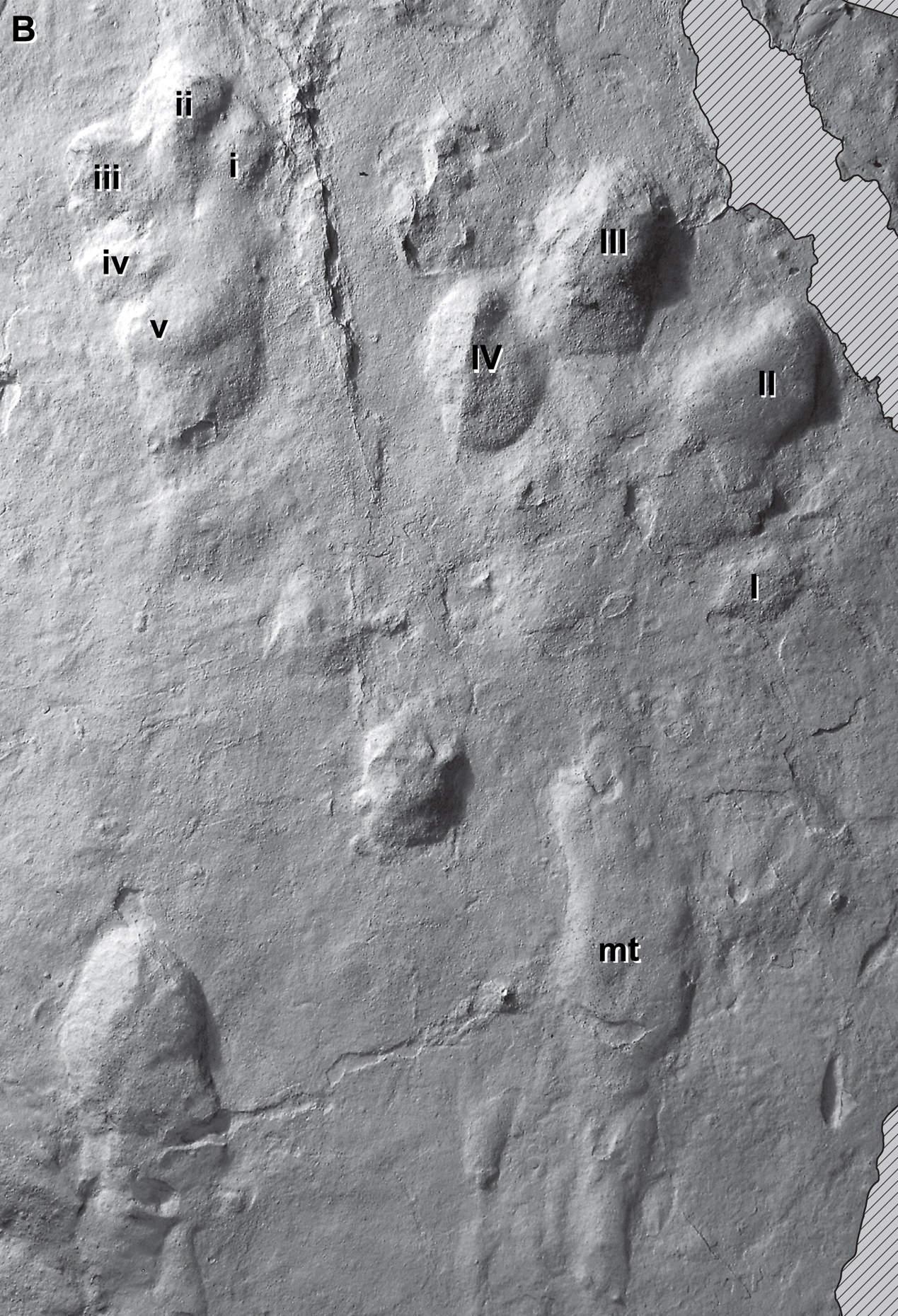
- Fossil (right) of the Early Jurassic dinosaur footprint ichnogenus Anomoepus
  †Anomoepus – tentative report
- †Apateodus
- †Apatopus
- †Apatosaurus – type locality for genus
  - †Apatosaurus ajax – type locality for species
  - †Apatosaurus laticollis – type locality for species. Junior synonym of A. louisae.
  - †Apatosaurus louisae
- †Arcellites
  - †Arcellites disciformis
- †Archaeolamna
  - †Archaeolamna kopingensis
- †Arenicolites
- Aspideretes
  - †Aspideretes vagans – type locality for species
- †Aspideretoides
- Astarte
- †Atlantosaurus
  - †Atlantosaurus immanis – type locality for species
- †Axonoceras
  - †Axonoceras compressum

== B ==
- †Baculites
  - †Baculites aquilaensis
  - †Baculites asper
  - †Baculites clinolobatus – type locality for species
  - †Baculites codyensis
  - †Baculites compressus
  - †Baculites cuneatus
  - †Baculites grandis
  - †Baculites haresi
  - †Baculites mclearni
  - †Baculites meeki – type locality for species
  - †Baculites reesidei
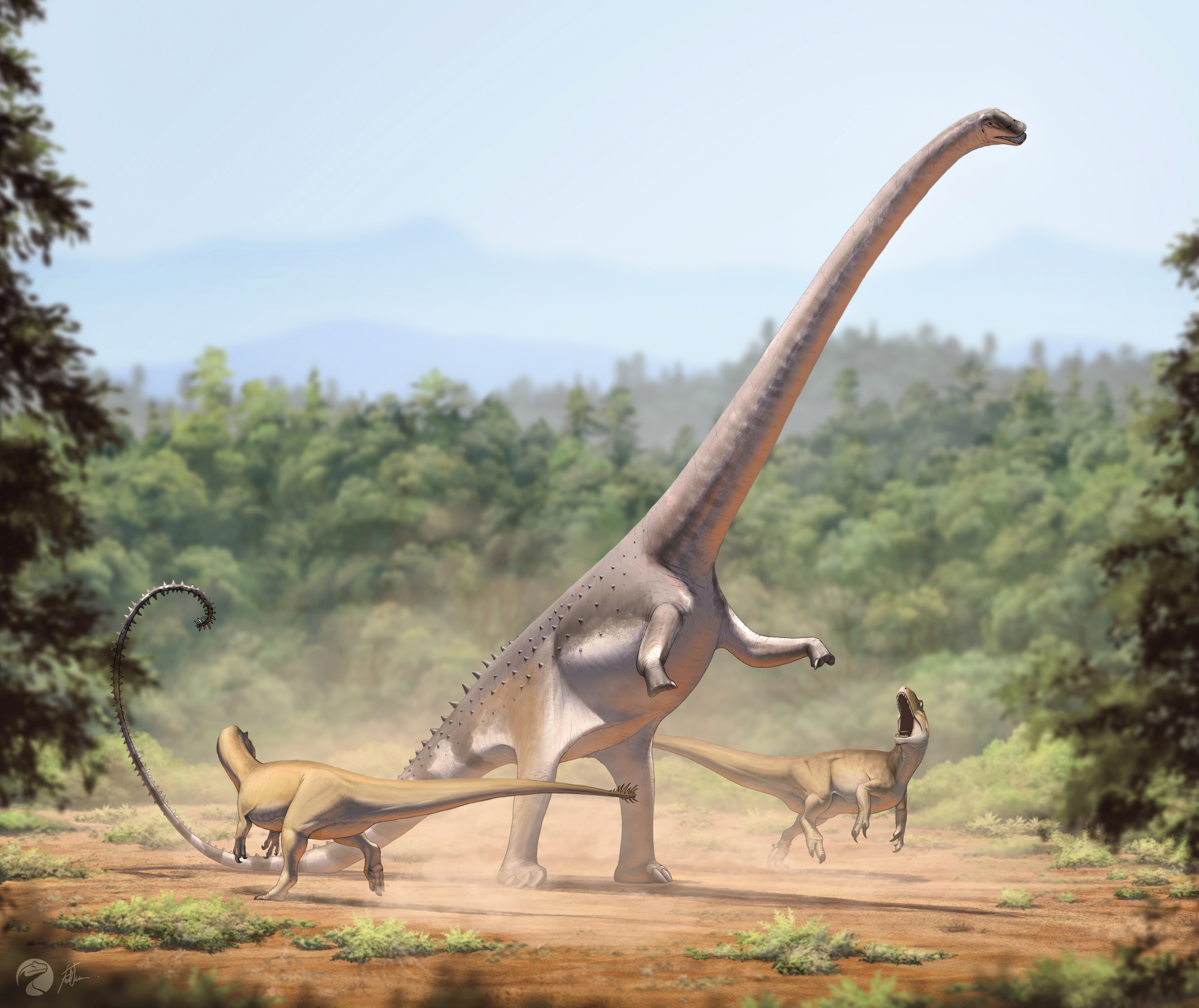
- Restoration of the Late Jurassic sauropod dinosaur Barosaurus rearing to defend itself against a pair of the theropod Allosaurus
  †Barosaurus
- †Basilemys
  - †Basilemys sinuosa – or unidentified comparable form
- †Behuninia
  - †Behuninia provoensis
- †Bellifusus
- †Bison
  - †Bison alticornis – type locality for species
- †Borealosuchus
  - †Borealosuchus sternbergii
- †Brachauchenius – or unidentified comparable form
- †Brachiosaurus – type locality for genus
  - †Brachiosaurus altithorax – type locality for species
- †Brachychampsa
  - †Brachychampsa montana
- †Brachychirotherium
- †Brachyphyllum
  - †Brachyphyllum rechtenii – type locality for species
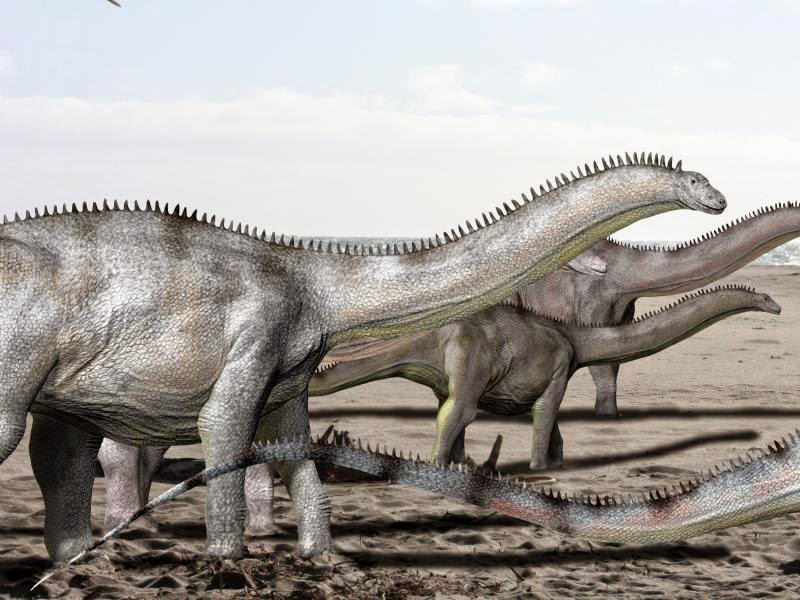
- Life restoration of a herd of the Late Jurassic sauropod dinosaur Brontosaurus
  †Brontosaurus
  - †Brontosaurus excelsus
  - †Brontosaurus yahnahpin

== C ==
- †Calycoceras
  - †Calycoceras canitaurinum
  - †Calycoceras naviculare
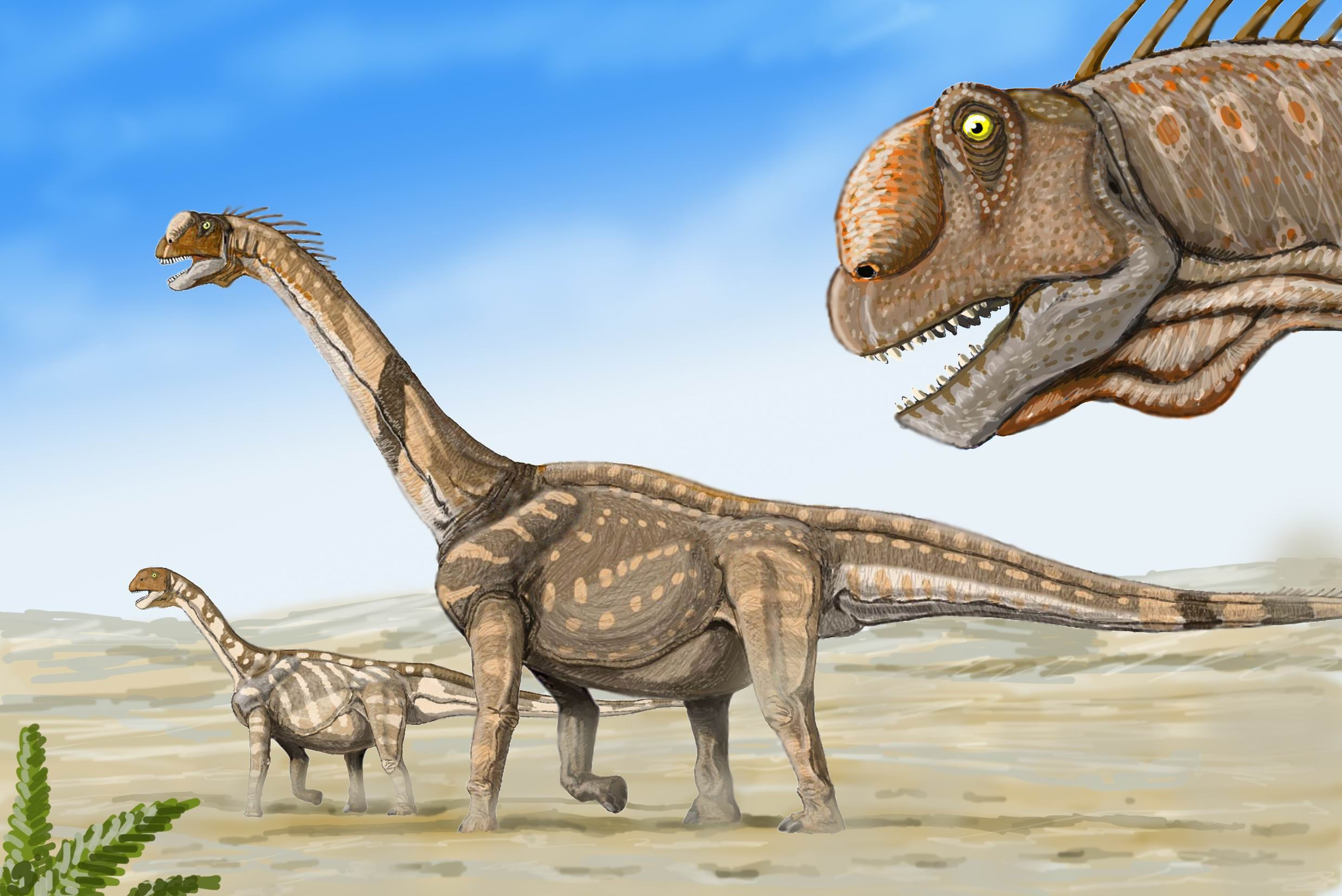
- Life restoration of a herd of the Late Jurassic sauropod dinosaur Camarasaurus
  †Camarasaurus – type locality for genus
  - †Camarasaurus agilis – type locality for species
  - †Camarasaurus grandis
  - †Camarasaurus lewisi
  - †Camarasaurus supremus – type locality for species
- †Camptosaurus – type locality for genus
  - †Camptosaurus dispar – type locality for species
- Carcharias
  - †Carcharias amonensis
  - †Carcharias saskatchewanensis
  - †Carcharias tenuiplicatus
- †Caririchnium
  - †Caririchnium leonardii – type locality for species
  - †Caririchnium leonaridii
- †Cataceramus
  - †Cataceramus gladbeckensis
- †Cedrobaena
  - †Cedrobaena brinkman
- †Ceratodus – type locality for genus
  - †Ceratodus felchi – type locality for species
  - †Ceratodus guentheri – type locality for species
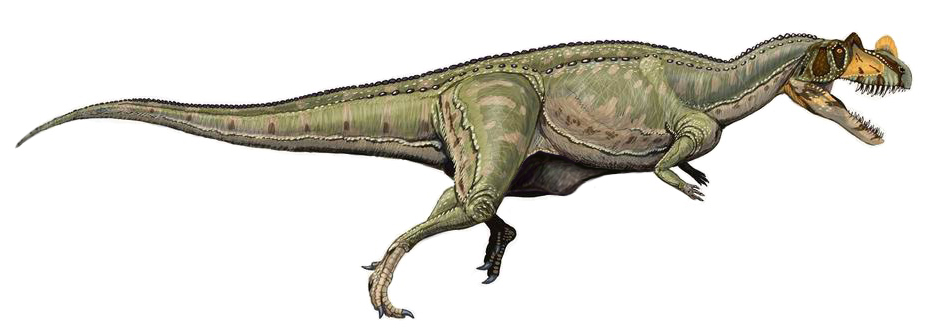
- Restoration of the Late Jurassic ceratosaur Ceratosaurus
  †Ceratosaurus – type locality for genus
  - †Ceratosaurus nasicornis – type locality for species
- Cerithiopsis
- †Champsosaurus
- Chara
- †Chelonipus
- †Chinlea
  - †Chinlea sorenseni
- †Chinlestegophis – type locality for genus
  - †Chinlestegophis jenkinsi – type locality for species
- †Chirotherium
  - †Chirotherium lulli
- †Cimolichthys
  - †Cimolichthys nepaholica
- †Cimolodon – or unidentified comparable form
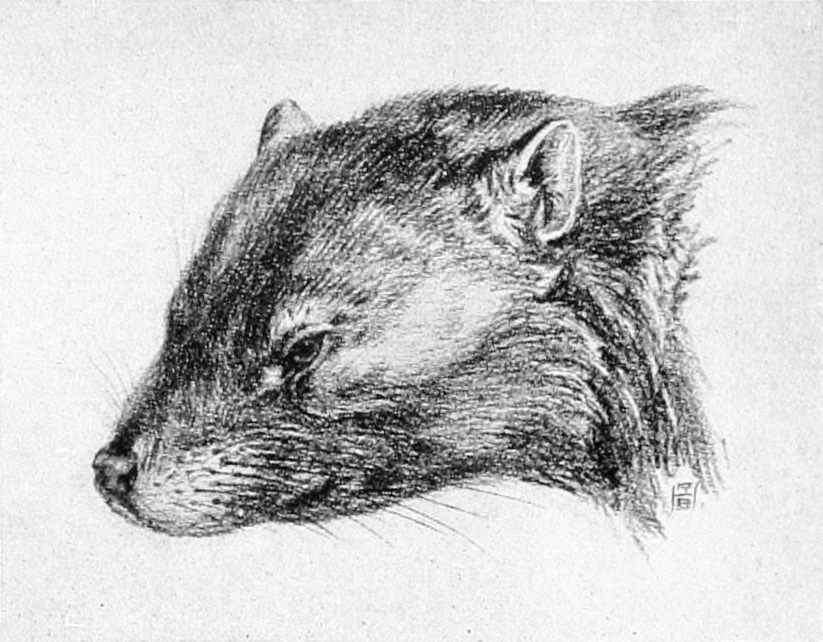
- Life restoration of the face of the Late Cretaceous multituberculate mammal Cimolomys
  †Cimolomys
- †Cionichthys
  - †Cionichthys dunklei
- †Cionodon – type locality for genus
  - †Cionodon arctatus – type locality for species
- †Cirroceras
  - †Cirroceras conradi
- †Cladoceramus
  - †Cladoceramus undulatoplicatus
- †Clidastes
- †Clioscaphites
  - †Clioscaphites choteauensis
  - †Clioscaphites saxitonianus
  - †Clioscaphites vermiformis
- †Coahuilites
  - †Coahuilites sheltoni
- †Cochlichnus
- †Codellaster – type locality for genus
  - †Codellaster keepersae – type locality for species
- †Coelophysis – tentative report
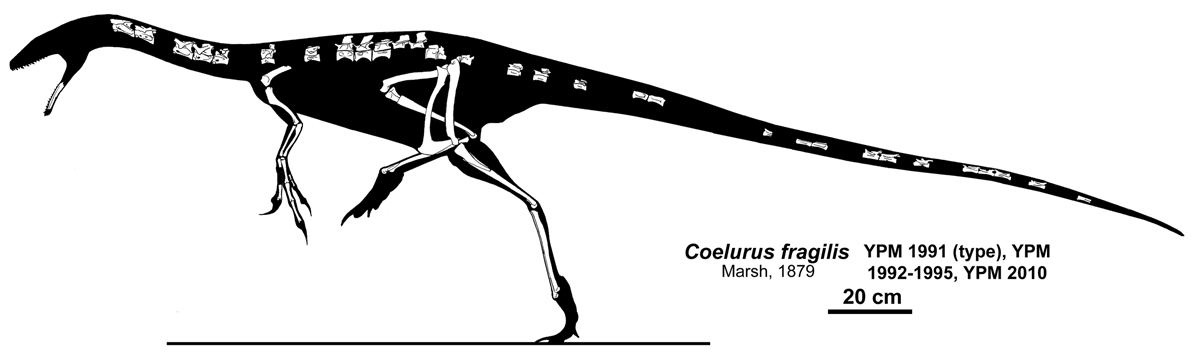
- Diagram illustrating the known fossil material of the Late Jurassic theropod dinosaur Coelurus
  †Coelurus
  - †Coelurus fragilis
- †Compsemys
  - †Compsemys victa
- †Coniasaurus
  - †Coniasaurus crassidens
- Corbula
- †Corydalites – type locality for genus
  - †Corydalites fecundum – type locality for species
- Crassatella
  - †Crassatella franzeseii
- †Cremnoceramus
  - †Cremnoceramus deformis
- †Crenella
- †Creonella
  - †Creonella triplicata
- †Cretodus
  - †Cretodus semiplicatus
- †Cretolamna
  - †Cretolamna appendiculata
- †Cretomanta
  - †Cretomanta canadensis
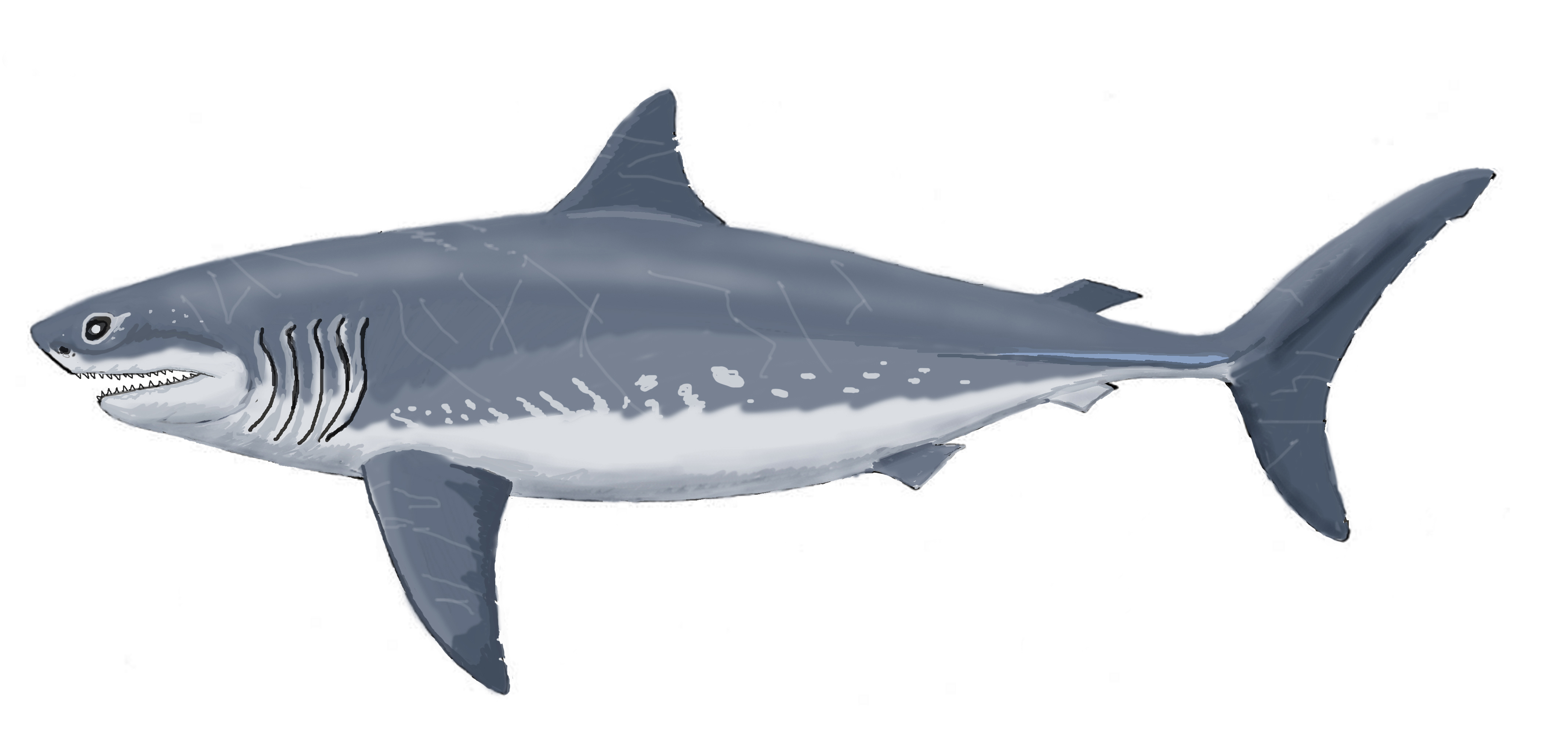
- Restoration of the Late Cretaceous shark Cretoxyrhina, or the Ginsu shark
  †Cretoxyrhina
  - †Cretoxyrhina mantelli
- Cucullaea
  - †Cucullaea nebrascensis
- Cuspidaria
  - †Cuspidaria ventricosa
- †Czekanowskia
  - †Czekanowskia turneri – tentative report

== D ==
- †Diablophis
  - †Diablophis gilmorei – type locality for species
- †Didymoceras
  - †Didymoceras aurarium – type locality for species
  - †Didymoceras cheyennense
  - †Didymoceras draconis
  - †Didymoceras stevensoni
- †Dinehichnus
  - †Dinehichnus socialis
- †Dinochelys
  - †Dinochelys whitei
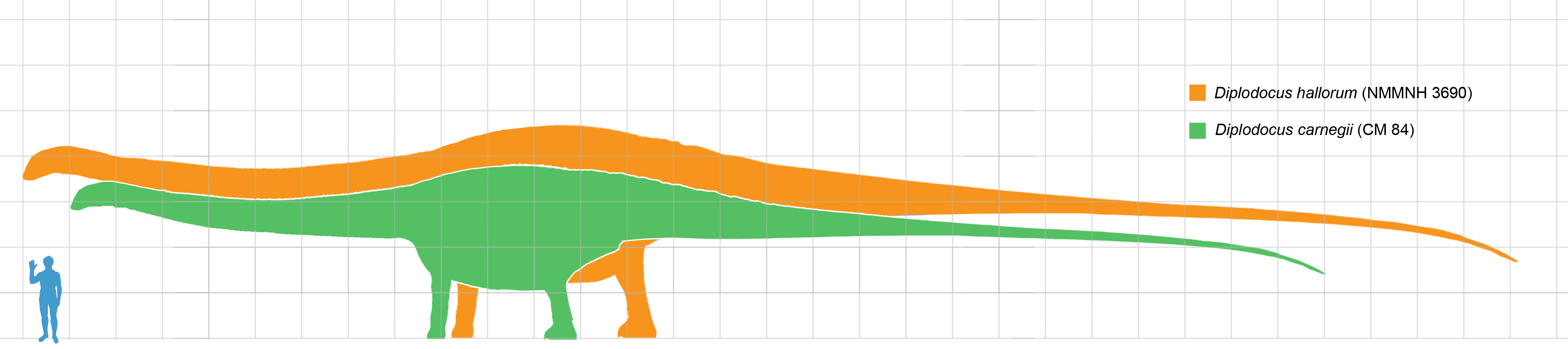
- Diagram illustrating the Late Jurassic sauropod dinosaurs Diplodocus carnegii (green) and D. hallorum (orange) with an anachronistic human to scale.
  †Diplodocus – type locality for genus
  - †Diplodocus lacustris – type locality for species
  - †Diplodocus longus – type locality for species
- Diplodonta
  - †Diplodonta davisi
- †Diplosaurus
  - †Diplosaurus felix – type locality for species
- Discinisca
- †Discoscaphites
  - †Discoscaphites conradi
- †Docodon
  - †Docodon apoxys – type locality for species
- †Dorsetisaurus
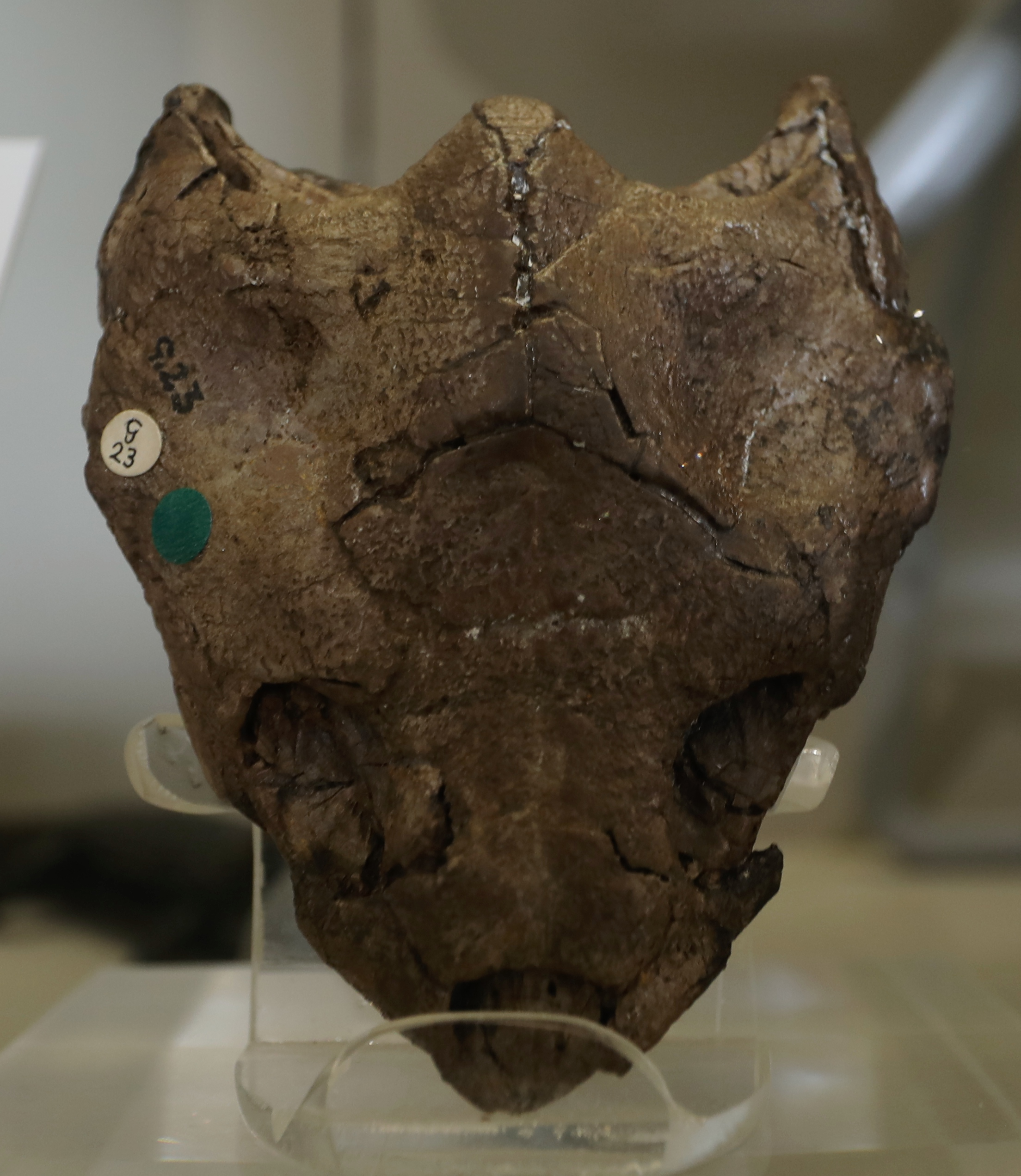
- Fossilized skull of the Late Jurassic-Early Cretaceous turtle Dorsetochelys
  †Dorsetochelys
  - †Dorsetochelys buzzops – type locality for species
- †Drepanocheilus
  - †Drepanocheilus evansi
  - †Drepanocheilus nebrascensis
  - †Drepanocheilus obesus
- †Dryophyllum
  - †Dryophyllum tennesseensis
- †Dryosaurus
  - †Dryosaurus altus

== E ==
- †Edmontonia
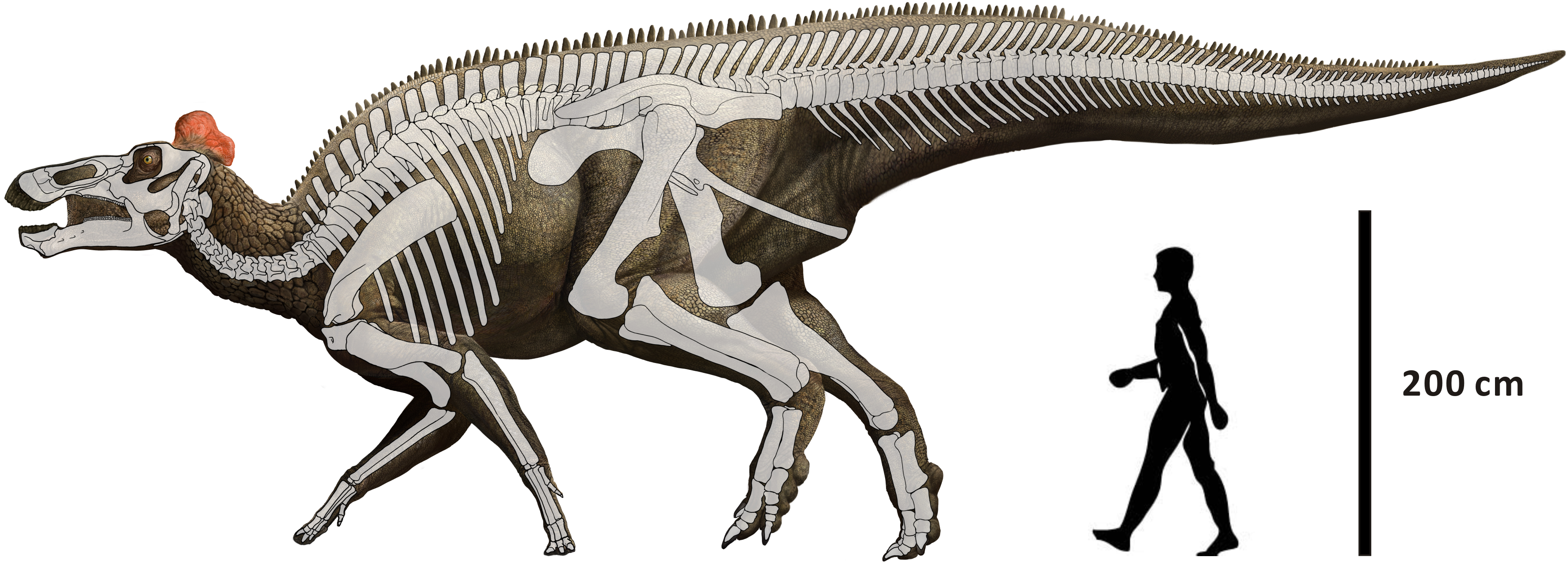
- Skeletal reconstruction and restored soft tissue of the Late Cretaceous duck-billed dinosaur Edmontosaurus regalis with an anachronistic human to scale
  †Edmontosaurus
  - †Edmontosaurus regalis – type locality for species
- Eilenodon – type locality for genus
  - †Eilenodon robustus – type locality for species
- †Elopopsis
- †Enchodus
  - †Enchodus gladiolus – or unidentified comparable form
  - †Enchodus shumardi – or unidentified comparable form
- †Entolium
- †Eoacteon
  - †Eoacteon sublinearis
- †Eomunidopsis
  - †Eomunidopsis cobbani – type locality for species
- †Eosauropus
  - †Eosauropus cimarronensis
  - †Eosauropus cimmaronensis
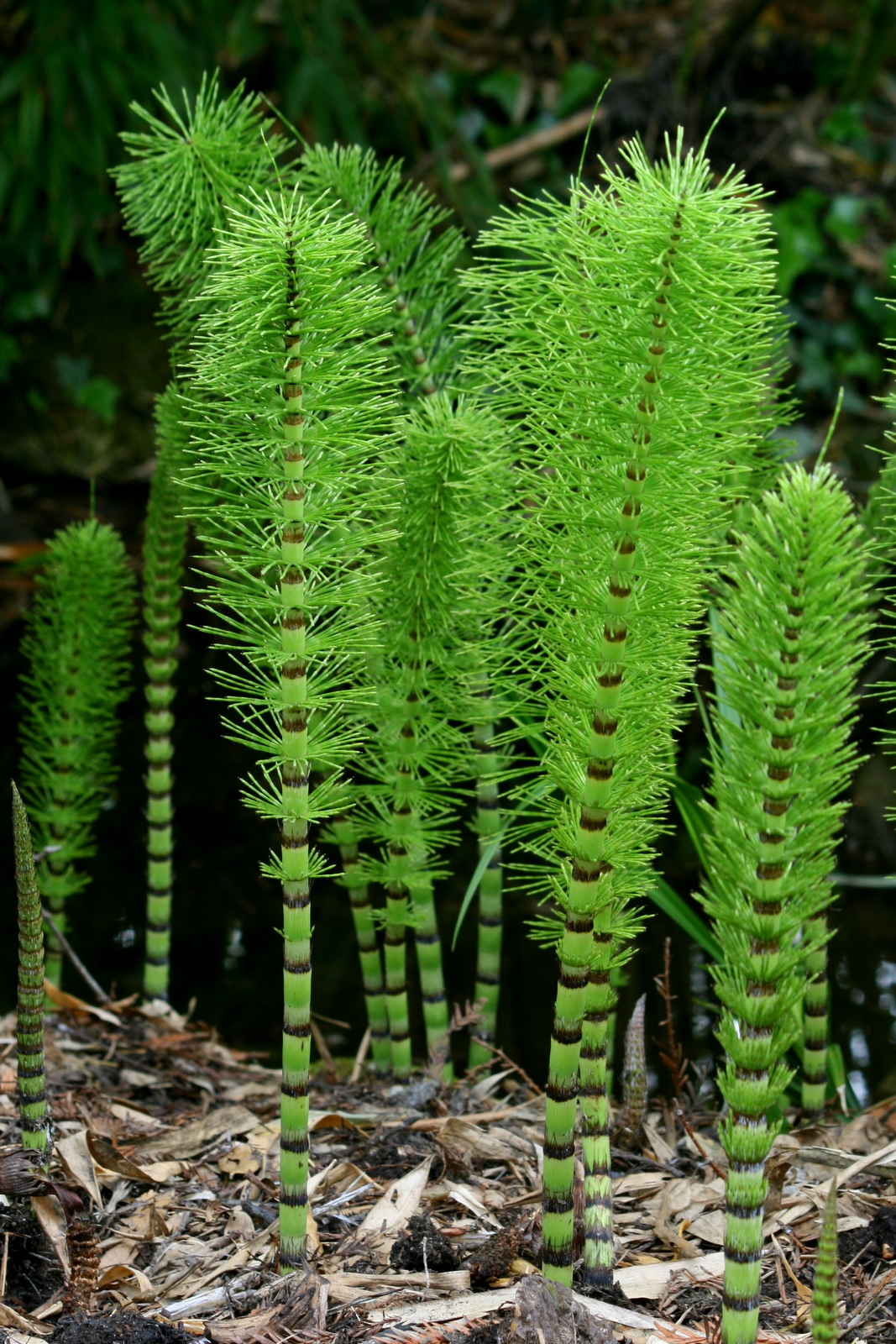
- A living Equisetum, or horsetail
  †Equisetum
  - †Equisetum burchardtii – or unidentified comparable form
- †Etea
  - †Etea peasei
- †Eubrontes
  - †Eubrontes giganteus
- †Eucalycoceras
  - †Eucalycoceras pentagonum
- †Euomphaloceras
  - †Euomphaloceras septemseriatum
- †Eutrephoceras
  - †Eutrephoceras dekayi
- †Eutretauranosuchus – type locality for genus
  - †Eutretauranosuchus delfsi – type locality for species
- †Exiteloceras
  - †Exiteloceras jenneyi
- †Exogyra
  - †Exogyra boveyensis – or unidentified related form

== F ==
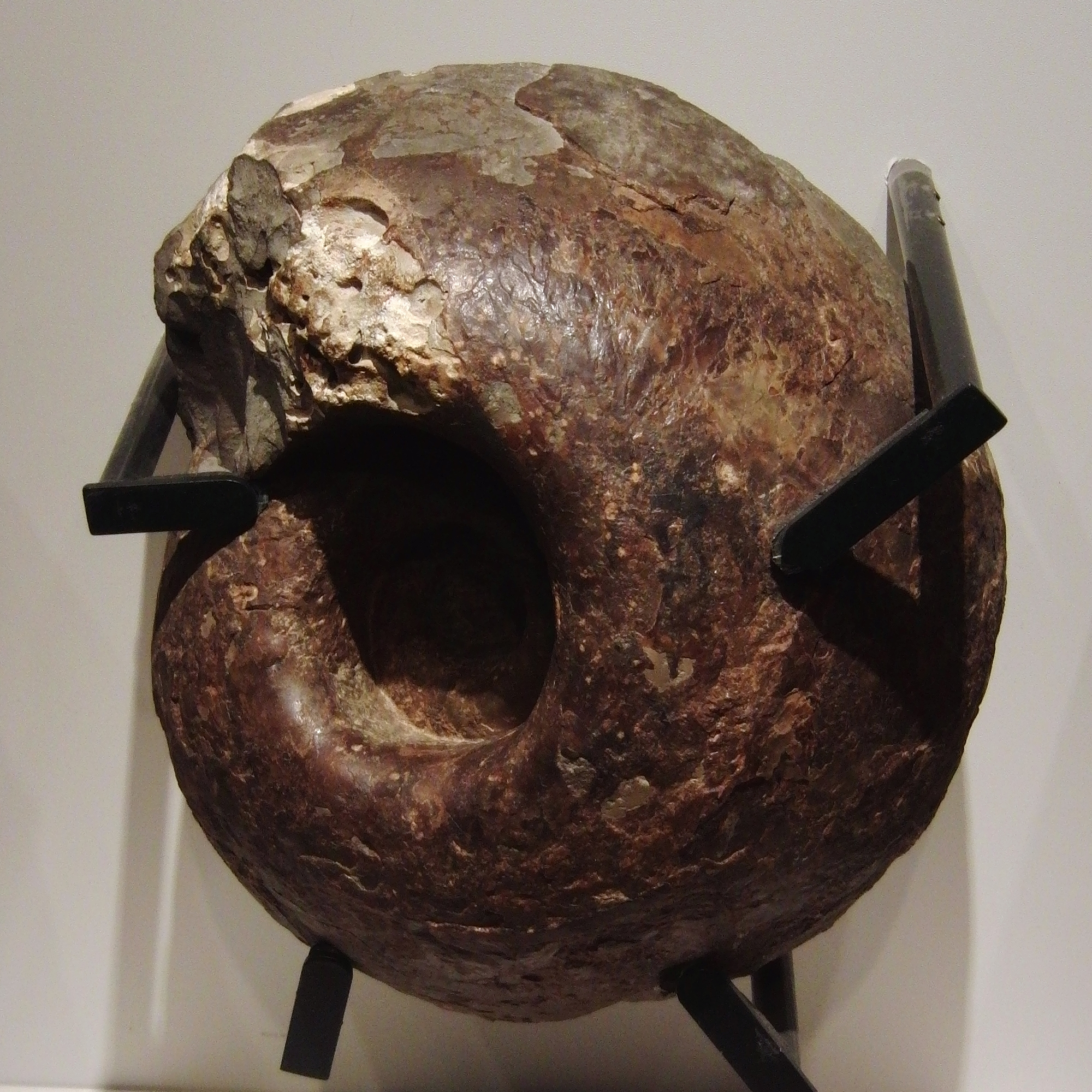
- Fossilized shell of the Late Cretaceous ammonoid cephalopod Fagesia
  †Fagesia
- Ficus
  - †Ficus planicostata
- †Forresteria
  - †Forresteria hobsoni – type locality for species
- †Fruitachampsa – type locality for genus
  - †Fruitachampsa callisoni – type locality for species
- †Fruitadens – type locality for genus
  - †Fruitadens haagarorum – type locality for species
- †Fruitafossor – type locality for genus
  - †Fruitafossor windscheffeli – type locality for species

== G ==
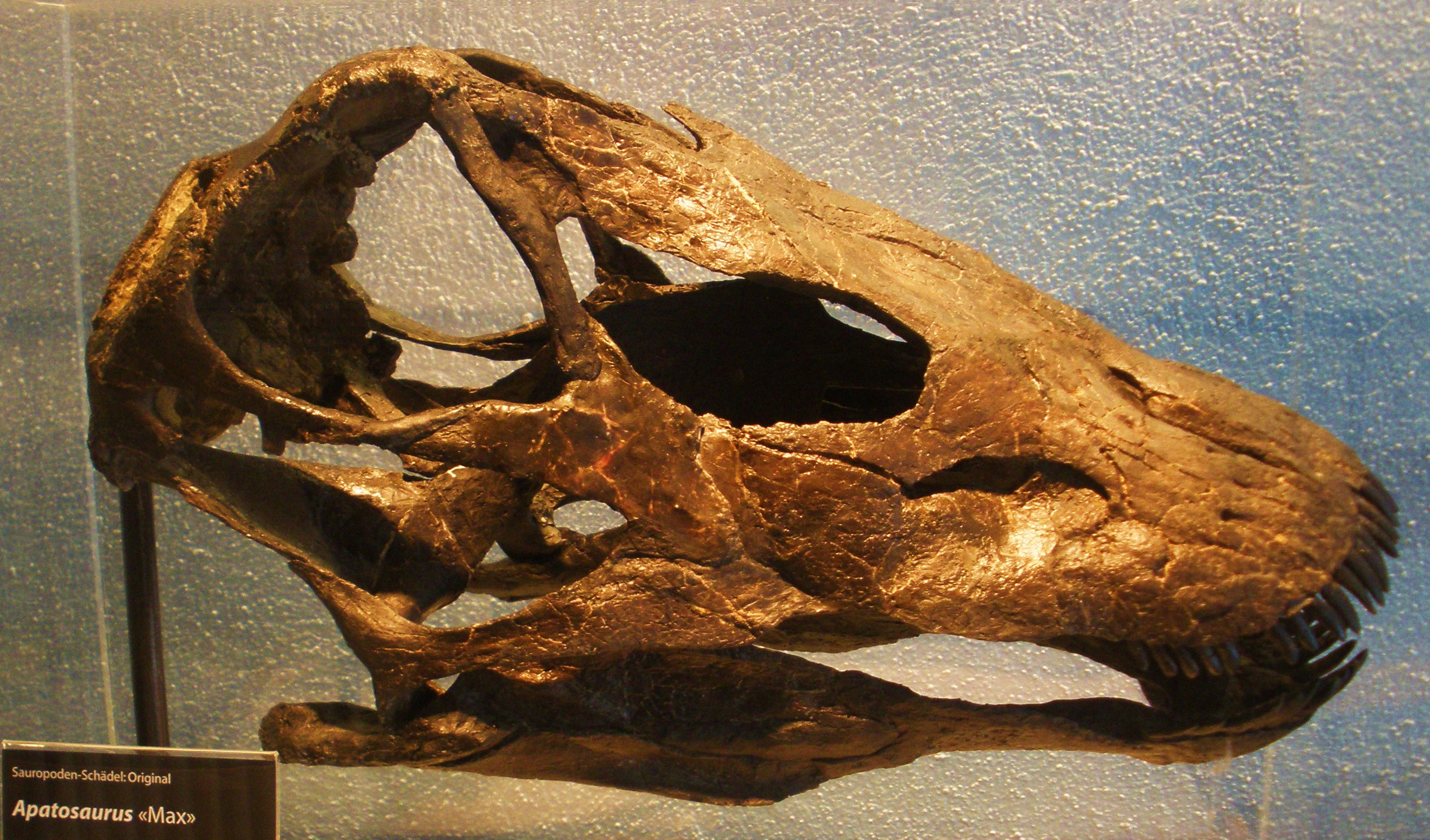
- Fossilized skull of the Late Jurassic sauropod dinosaur Galeamopus
  †Galeamopus
  - †Galeamopus pabsti
- †Glirodon
  - †Glirodon grandis
- †Glyptops
  - †Glyptops plicatulus – type locality for species
- †Goniopholis
  - †Goniopholis felchi – type locality for species
- †Grallator
  - †Grallator cursorius
  - †Grallator tenuis
- †Gryphaeostrea
- †Gwyneddichnium
- †Gypsonictops
- †Gyroides

== H ==
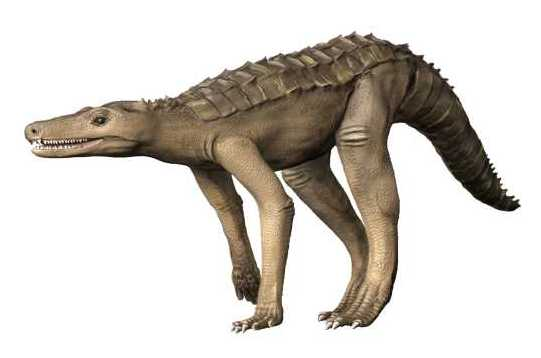
- Restoration of the Late Jurassic crocodile relative Hallopus
  †Hallopus
  - †Hallopus victor – type locality for species
- †Haplocanthosaurus – type locality for genus
  - †Haplocanthosaurus delfsi – type locality for species
  - †Haplocanthosaurus priscus – type locality for species
- †Harduinia
  - †Harduinia stantoni
  - †Harduinia taylori
- †Haresiceras
  - †Haresiceras placentiforme
- †Helopanoplia
  - †Helopanoplia distincta – or unidentified comparable form
- †Hemicalypterus
- †Hermanophyton
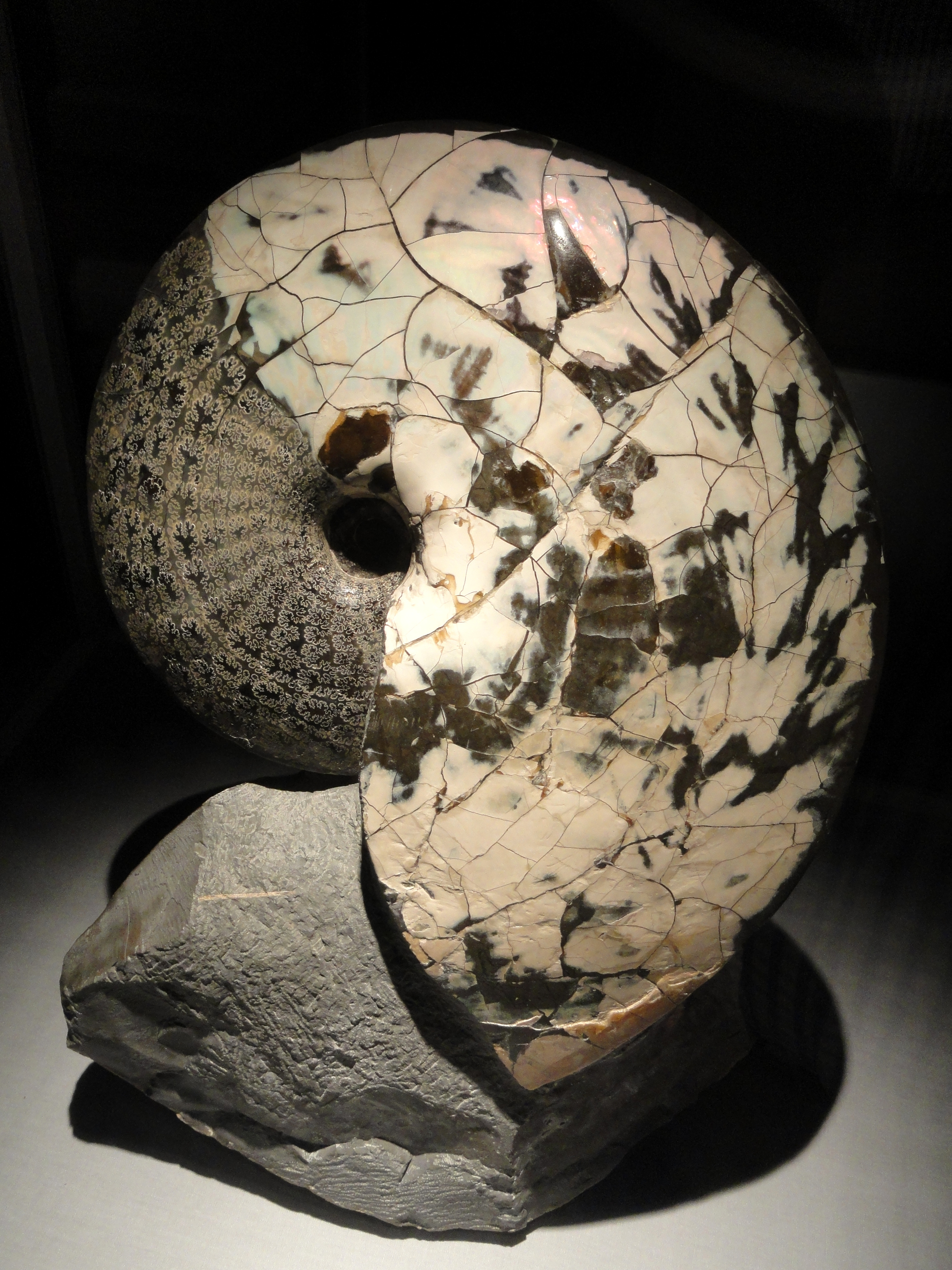
- Fossilized shell of the Late Cretaceous ammonoid cephalopod Herrickiceras
  †Herrickiceras
  - †Herrickiceras costatus
- †Holaster
  - †Holaster feralis – type locality for species
- †Homolopsis
- †Hoploscaphites
  - †Hoploscaphites birkelundae
  - †Hoploscaphites landesi
  - †Hoploscaphites macer
  - †Hoploscaphites nicolletii
- †Hulettia – report made of unidentified related form or using admittedly obsolete nomenclature
  - †Hulettia hawesi – type locality for species
- †Hypsirophus – type locality for genus
  - †Hypsirophus discurus – type locality for species

== I ==
- †Ichthyodectes
- †Ignotornis – type locality for genus
  - †Ignotornis mcconnelli – type locality for species
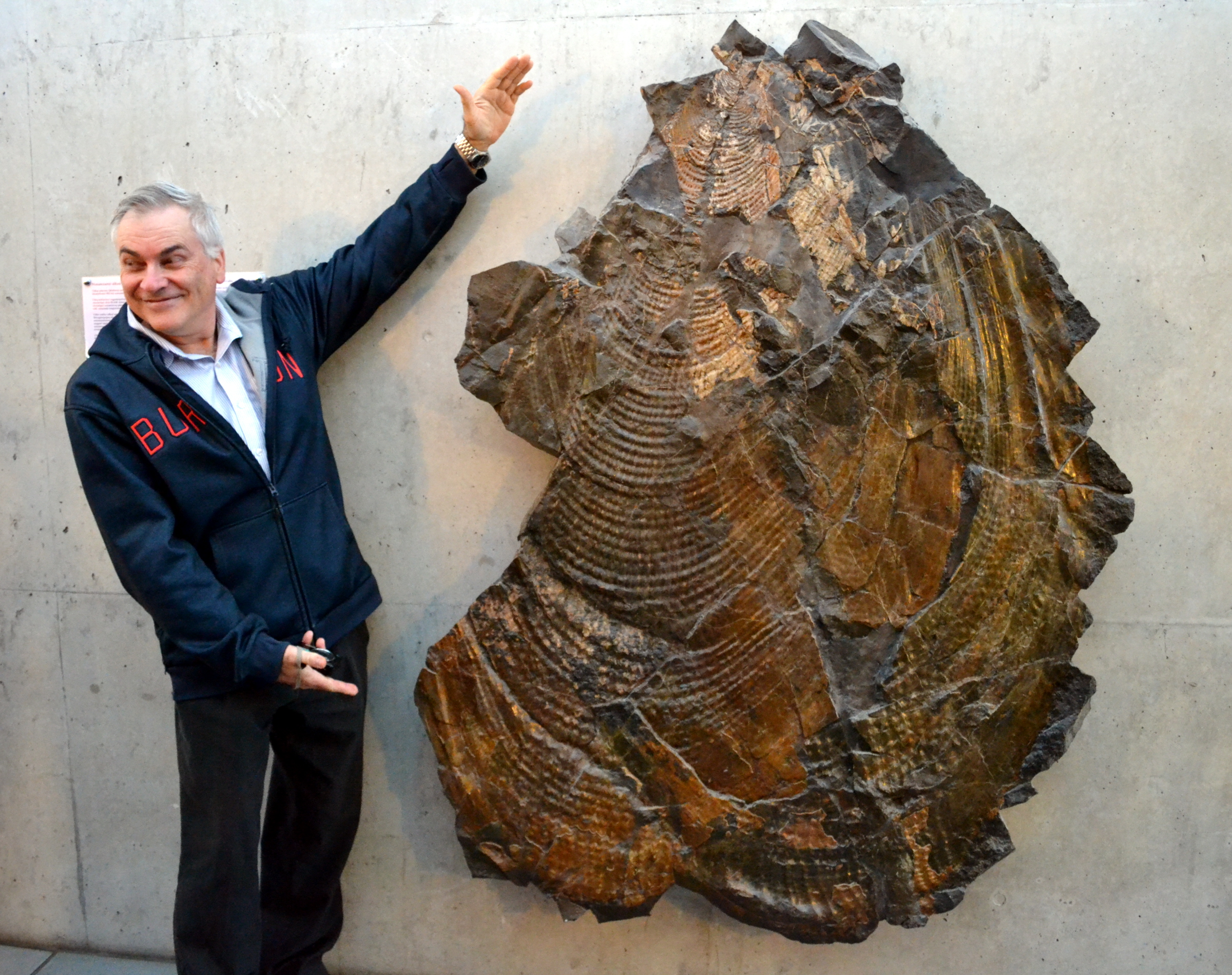
- Fossilized shell of the Early Jurassic-Late Cretaceous marine bivalve Inoceramus with a human indicating its size
  †Inoceramus
  - †Inoceramus altus
  - †Inoceramus altusiformis
  - †Inoceramus anomalus
  - †Inoceramus arnoldi
  - †Inoceramus balticus
  - †Inoceramus brancoiformis
  - †Inoceramus bueltenensis
  - †Inoceramus cordiformis
  - †Inoceramus crippsi – or unidentified related form
  - †Inoceramus deformis
  - †Inoceramus erectus
  - †Inoceramus flavus
  - †Inoceramus grandis
  - †Inoceramus longealatus
  - †Inoceramus muelleri - or unidentified loosely related form
  - †Inoceramus oblongus
  - †Inoceramus pictus
  - †Inoceramus prefragilis
  - †Inoceramus rutherfordi – or unidentified comparable form
  - †Inoceramus tenuistriatus – tentative report
- †Ischyrhiza
  - †Ischyrhiza avonicola – or unidentified comparable form

== J ==
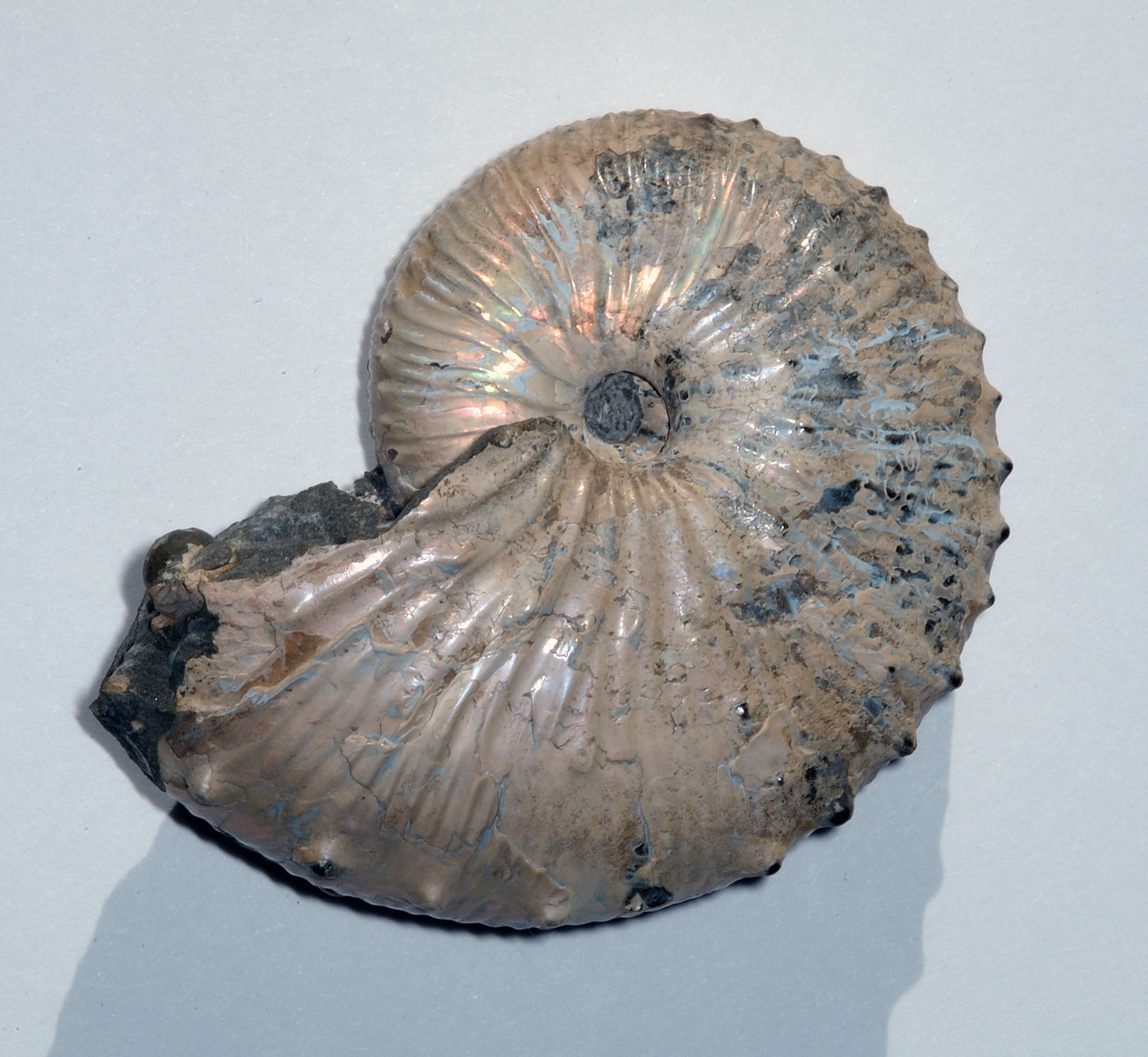
- Fossilized shell of the Late Cretaceous ammonoid cephalopod Jeletzkytes
  †Jeletzkytes
  - †Jeletzkytes brevis
  - †Jeletzkytes dorfi
  - †Jeletzkytes nodosus
- †Jensensispermum
  - †Jensensispermum redmondii
- Jupiteria
  - †Jupiteria scitula

== K ==
- †Kepodactylus – type locality for genus
  - †Kepodactylus insperatus – type locality for species

== L ==
- †Laosaurus – report made of unidentified related form or using admittedly obsolete nomenclature
- Laternula
- Lepisosteus – tentative report
  - †Lepisosteus occidentalis
- †Leptalestes – tentative report
  - †Leptalestes cooki
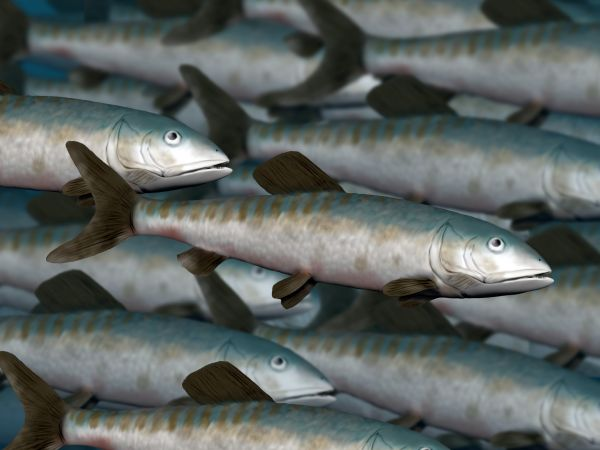
- Restoration of a school of the Middle Triassic-Early Cretaceous bony fish Leptolepis
  †Leptolepis – or unidentified comparable form
- †Lewyites
  - †Lewyites oronensis
- Lima
  - †Lima janetae – type locality for species
- †Lingula
- †Lioestheria
  - †Lioestheria tendagurensis – or unidentified comparable form
- †Lisserpeton
  - †Lisserpeton bairdi
- †Lonchidion
  - †Lonchidion selachos
- †Lucina
- †Lyropecten

== M ==
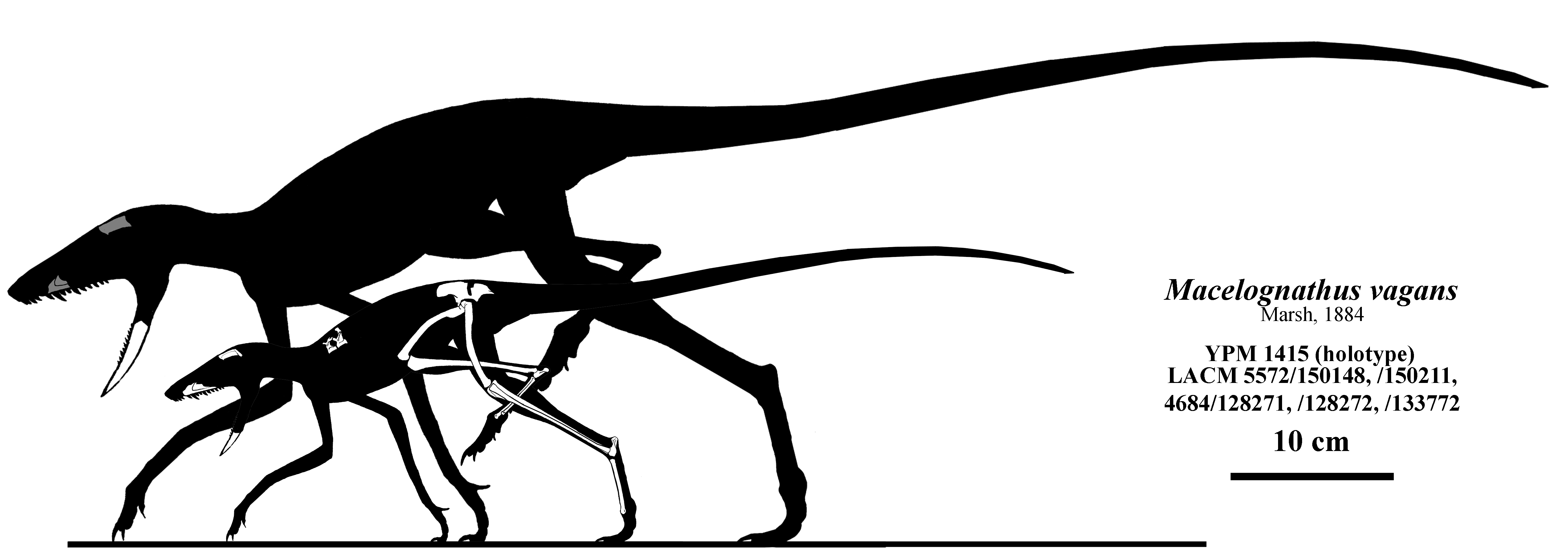
- Diagram illustrating the known fossil material of two specimens of the Late Jurassic crocodile relative Macelognathus
  †Macelognathus
  - †Macelognathus vagans
- †Magadiceramus
  - †Magadiceramus complicatus
  - †Magadiceramus crenelatus
  - †Magadiceramus soukupi - or unidentified loosely related form
  - †Magadiceramus subquadratus
- †Magnoavipes
  - †Magnoavipes caneeri – type locality for species
- †Marmarthia – or unidentified comparable form
  - †Marmarthia pearsonii
- †Marshosaurus – or unidentified comparable form
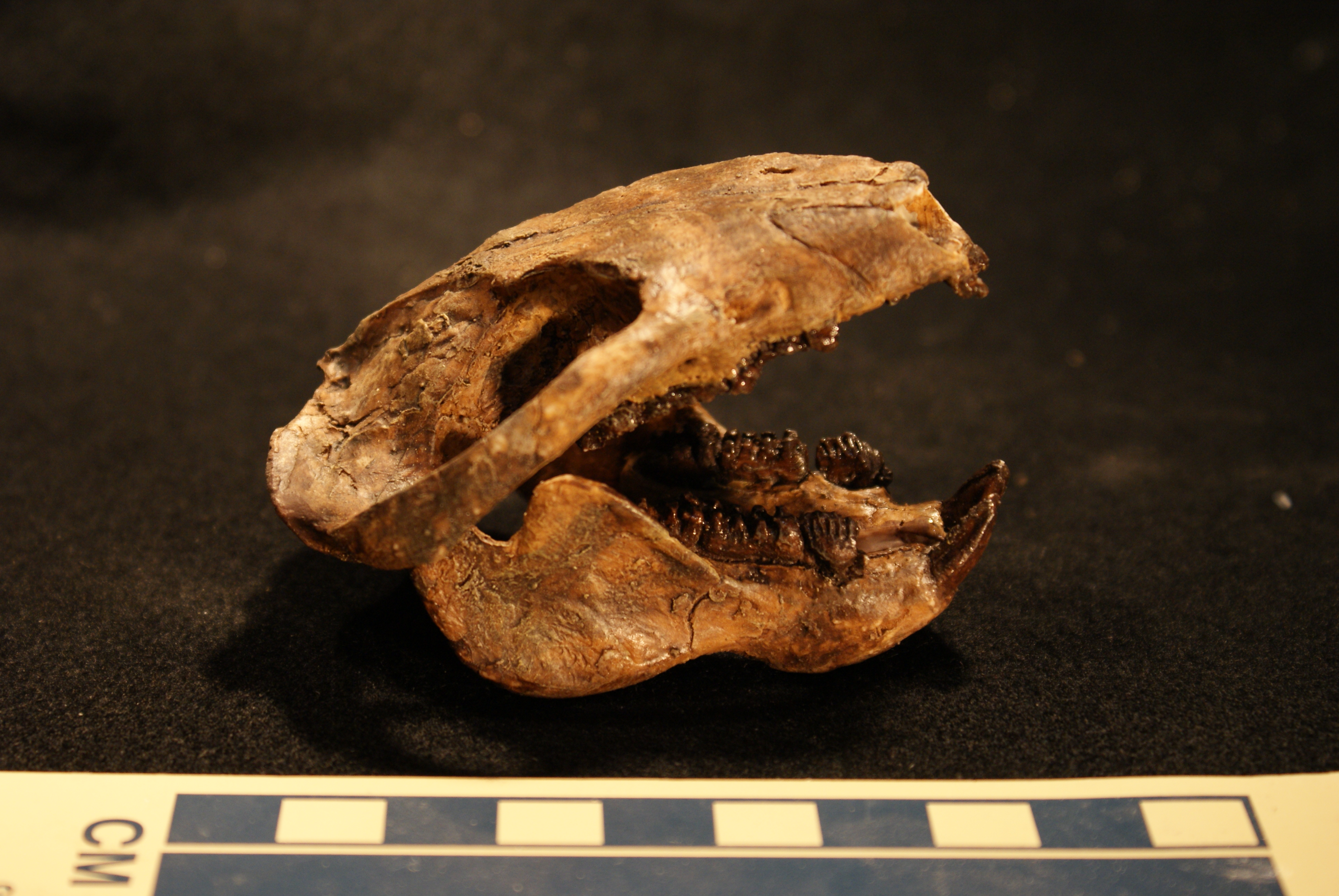
- Fossilized skull of the Late Cretaceous multituberculate mammal Meniscoessus
  †Meniscoessus
  - †Meniscoessus collomensis – type locality for species
  - †Meniscoessus conquistus
  - †Meniscoessus robustus – or unidentified comparable form
- †Mesadactylus – type locality for genus
  - †Mesadactylus ornithosphyos – type locality for species
- †Mesembrioxylon
  - †Mesembrioxylon carterii – type locality for species
- †Mesodma
  - †Mesodma formosa – or unidentified comparable form
- †Mesojassoides – type locality for genus
  - †Mesojassoides gigantea – type locality for species
- †Mesolanistes
  - †Mesolanistes reesidei
- †Metengonoceras
  - †Metengonoceras dumbli
- †Metoicoceras
  - †Metoicoceras geslinianum
- †Micrabacia
  - †Micrabacia radiata
- †Micropycnodon
  - †Micropycnodon kansasensis
- †Modiolus
  - †Modiolus kremmlingensis – type locality for species
  - †Modiolus meeki
- †Moremanoceras
  - †Moremanoceras scotti
- †Morosaurus
  - †Morosaurus laticollis – type locality for species
- †Morrolepis
  - †Morrolepis schaefferi – type locality for species
- †Myledaphus
  - †Myledaphus bipartitus
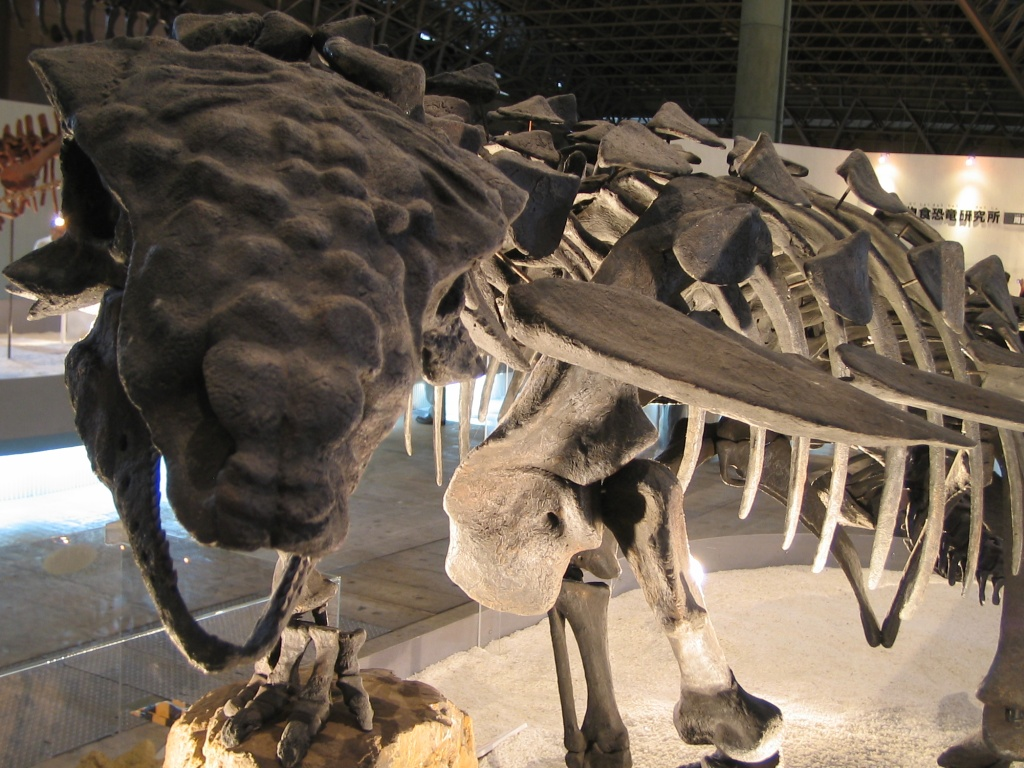
- Mounted fossilized skeleton of the Late Jurassic armored dinosaur Mymoorapelta
  †Mymoorapelta – type locality for genus
  - †Mymoorapelta maysi – type locality for species
- Myrica
  - †Myrica torreyi
- †Mytiloides
  - †Mytiloides duplicostatus – or unidentified related form
  - †Mytiloides latus – or unidentified comparable form
  - †Mytiloides mytiloides
  - †Mytiloides opalensis
  - †Mytiloides stantoni – or unidentified comparable form
  - †Mytiloides submytiloides – or unidentified related form

== N ==
- †Nanosaurus – type locality for genus
  - †Nanosaurus agilis – type locality for species
  - †Nanosaurus rex
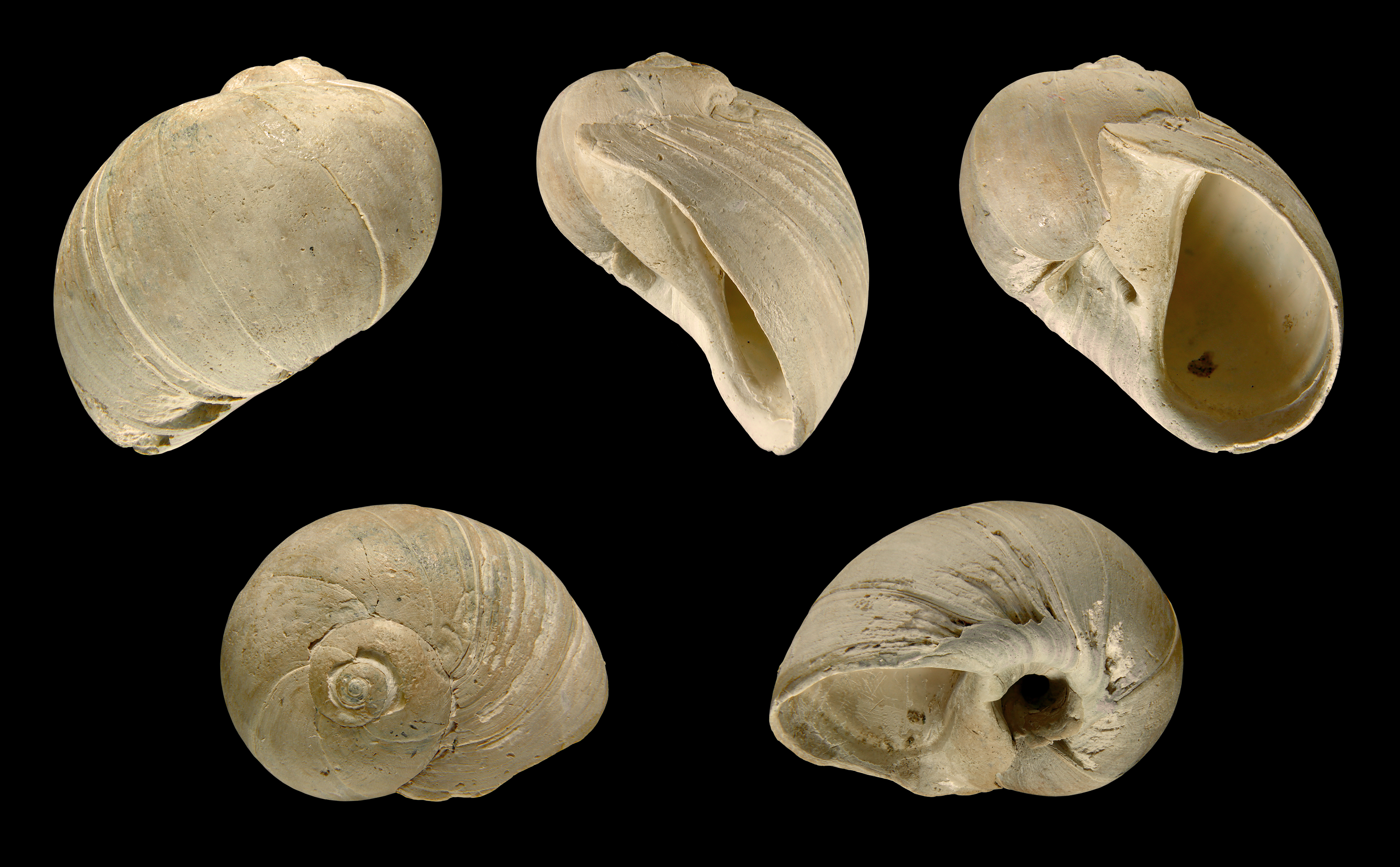
- Multiple views of a fossilized shell belonging to a Natica moon snail
  Natica
- †Nemodon
  - †Nemodon adkinsi
  - †Nemodon harriesi – type locality for species
- †Neocardioceras
  - †Neocardioceras densicostatum – type locality for species
  - †Neocardioceras juddii
  - †Neocardioceras laevigatum
  - †Neocardioceras minutum
  - †Neocardioceras uptonense
- †Neocrioceras
- †Neoptychites
  - †Neoptychites cephalotus
- †Neurankylus
- †Nigericeras
  - †Nigericeras scotti – type locality for species
- †Nonactaeonina
  - †Nonactaeonina deflexa
  - †Nonactaeonina triticea
- †Nortedelphys
  - †Nortedelphys jasoni
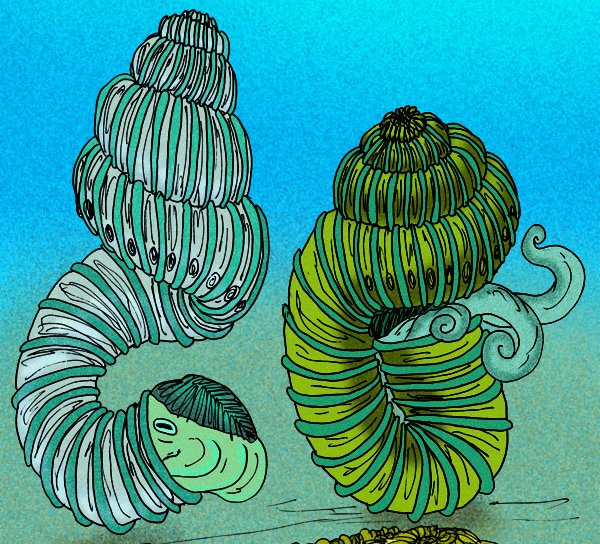
- Restoration of several species of the Late Cretaceous ammonoid cephalopod Nostoceras
  †Nostoceras
  - †Nostoceras approximans – or unidentified comparable form
  - †Nostoceras larimerense – type locality for species
  - †Nostoceras monotuberculatum
  - †Nostoceras obtusum – or unidentified comparable form
  - †Nostoceras splendidum – or unidentified comparable form
- Nucula
  - †Nucula percrassa
- Nuculana
- †Nymphalucina
  - †Nymphalucina bourni – type locality for species
  - †Nymphalucina cleburni

== O ==
- †Octopodichnus
- †Odaxosaurus
  - †Odaxosaurus piger
- †Oligoptycha
  - †Oligoptycha concinna
- †Opertochasma
  - †Opertochasma cuneatum
- †Opisthias
- †Opisthotriton
  - †Opisthotriton kayi
- †Ornitholestes – tentative report
- †Ornithomimipus
  - †Ornithomimipus angustus – or unidentified comparable form
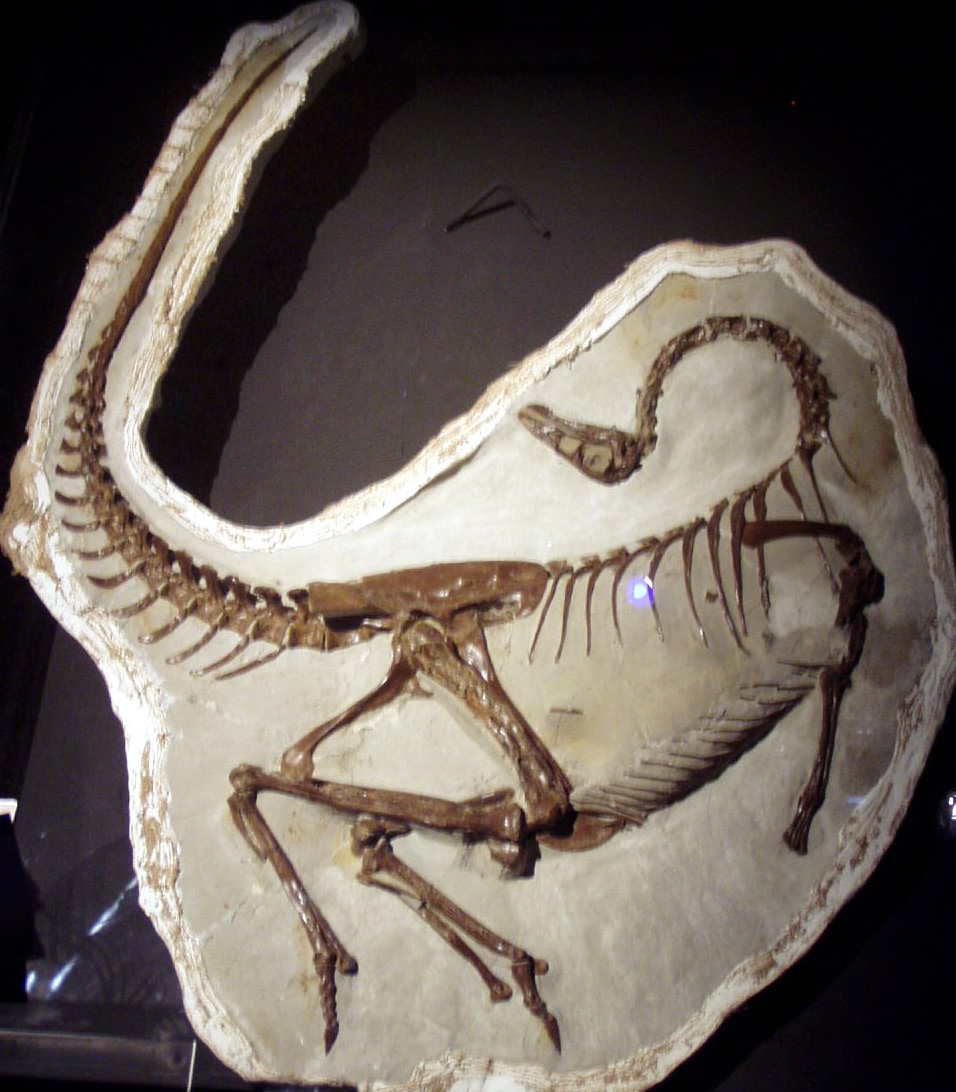
- Fossilized skeleton of the Late Cretaceous ostrich dinosaur Ornithomimus
  †Ornithomimus – type locality for genus
  - †Ornithomimus velox – type locality for species
- Ostrea
  - †Ostrea beloiti
  - †Ostrea subradiata
- †Othnielia – tentative report
- †Othnielosaurus
  - †Othnielosaurus consors
- †Oxybeloceras
  - †Oxybeloceras crassum
- †Oxytoma

== P ==
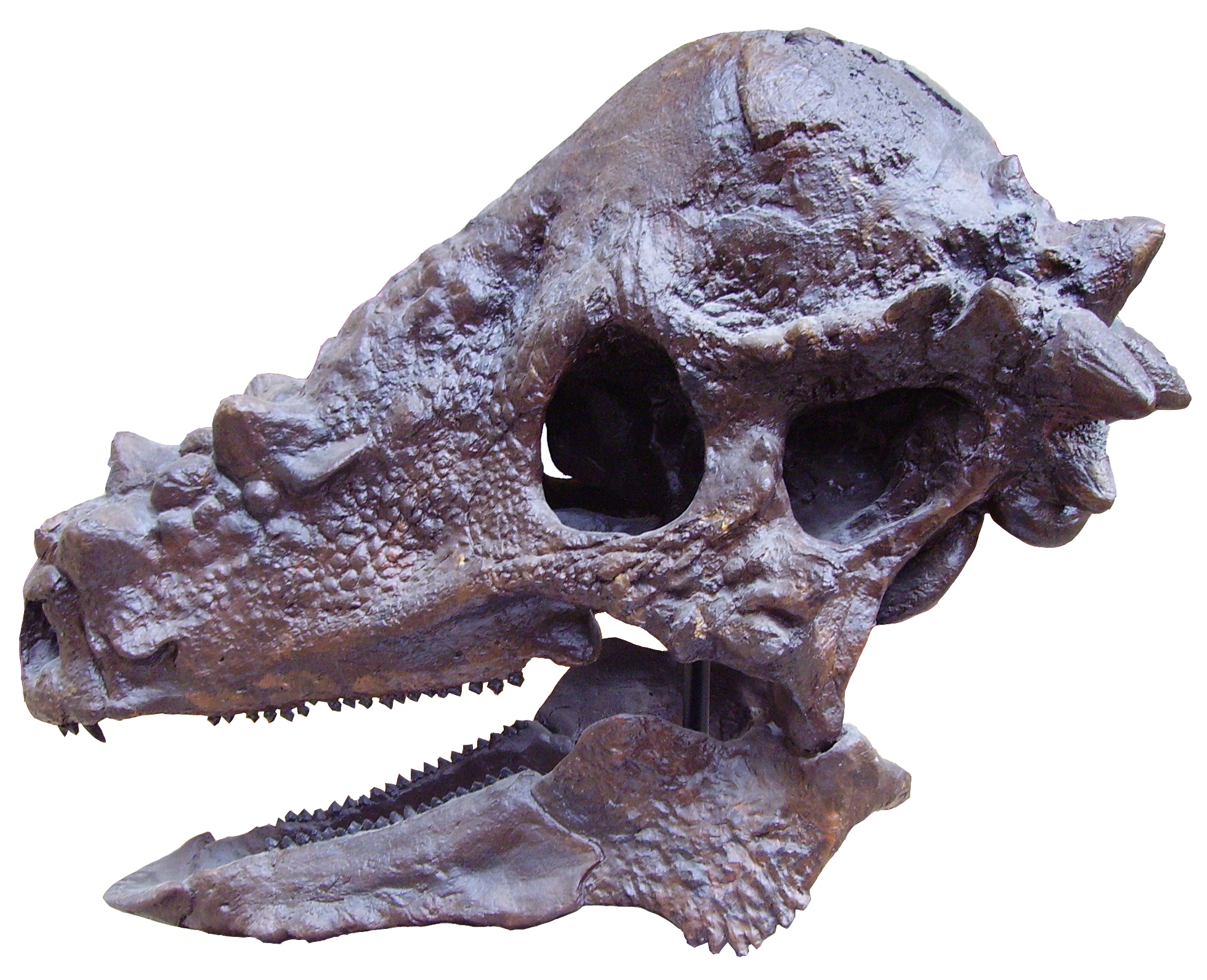
- Fossilized skull of the Late Cretaceous dome-headed dinosaur Pachycephalosaurus
  †Pachycephalosaurus
- †Pachyrhizodus
  - †Pachyrhizodus minimus
- †Palaeobalistum
- †Palaeopteryx – type locality for genus
- †Paleonelumbo
  - †Paleonelumbo macroloba
- †Parabrontopodus – type locality for genus
  - †Parabrontopodus mcintoshi – type locality for species
- †Parallelodon
- †Paramacellodus
- †Parapleurites
  - †Parapleurites morrisonensis – type locality for species
- †Paressonodon – type locality for genus
  - †Paressonodon nelsoni – type locality for species
- †Parikimys – type locality for genus
  - †Parikimys carpenteri – type locality for species
- †Parviraptor
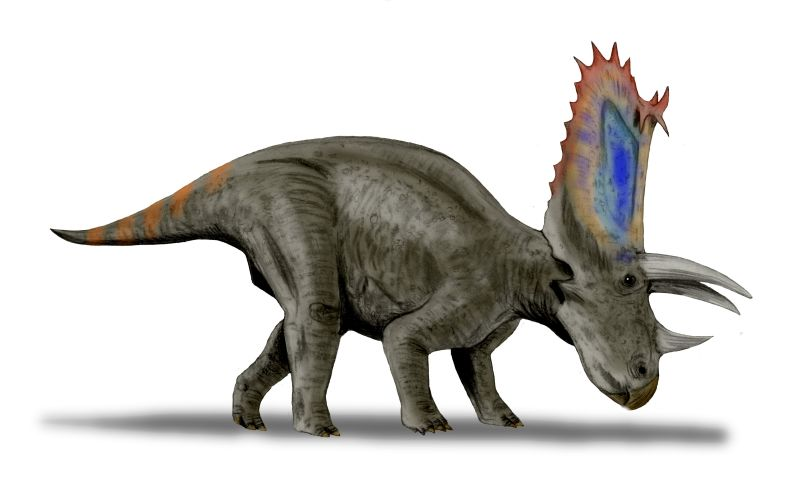
- Life restoration of the Late Cretaceous horned dinosaur Pentaceratops
  †Pentaceratops
  - †Pentaceratops sternbergii
- †Pentasauropus
- †Petropteron – type locality for genus
  - †Petropteron mirandum – type locality for species
- †Phelopteria
  - †Phelopteria linguaeformis
  - †Phelopteria ruppii – type locality for species
- †Phlycticrioceras
  - †Phlycticrioceras trinodosus
- †Pinna
- †Placenticeras
  - †Placenticeras meeki
  - †Placenticeras placentum
  - †Placenticeras syrtale
- †Plastomenus – tentative report
  - †Plastomenus insignis – type locality for species
  - †Plastomenus punctulatus – type locality for species
- †Platanites
  - †Platanites marginata
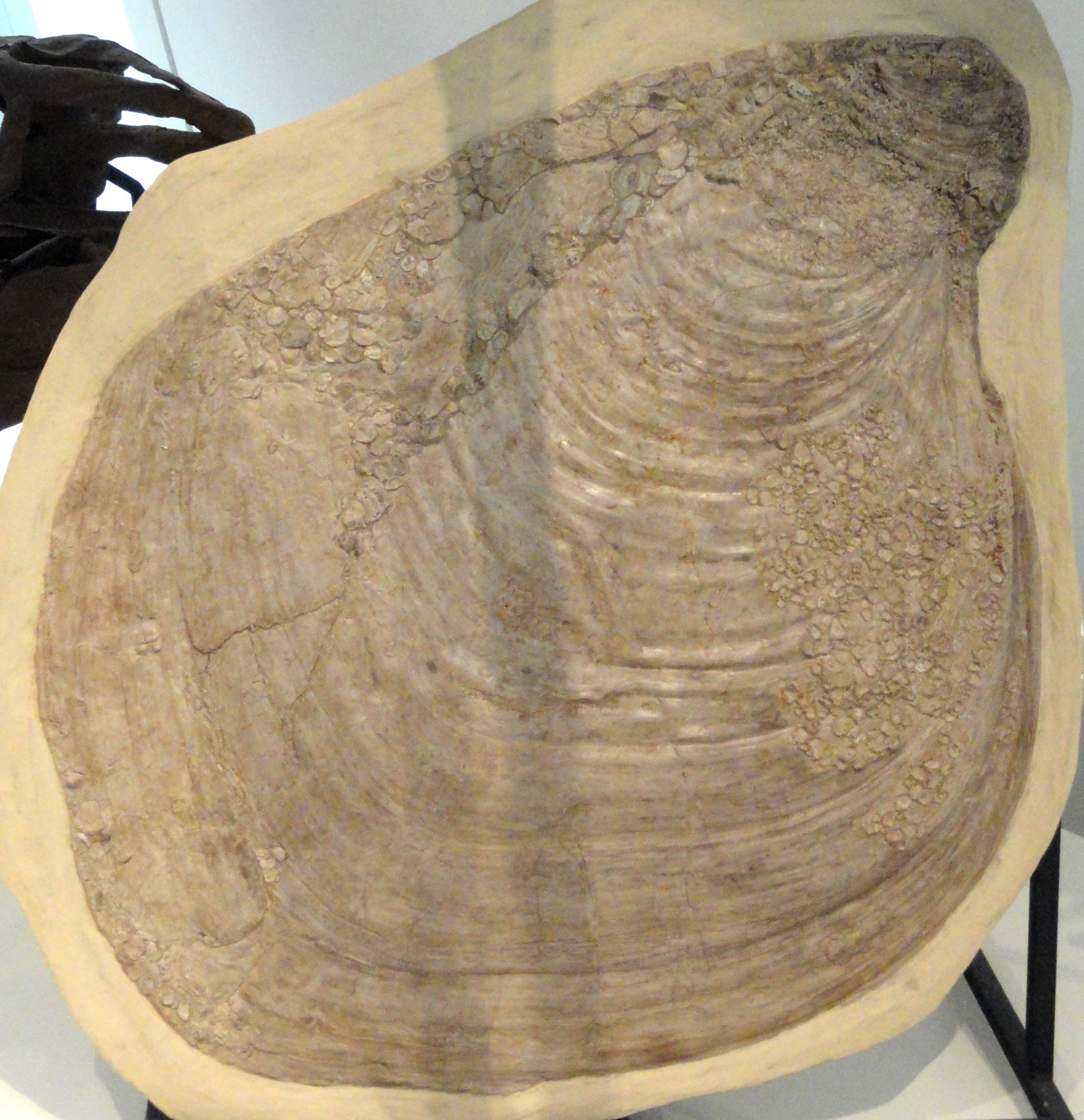
- Fossilized shell of the Cretaceous marine bivalve Platyceramus
  †Platyceramus
  - †Platyceramus ahsenensis
  - †Platyceramus cycloides
  - †Platyceramus mantelli - or unidentified loosely related form
  - †Platyceramus platinus
- †Platyognathus
- †Plesiobaena
  - †Plesiobaena antiqua – or unidentified comparable form
- †Polyonax – type locality for genus
  - †Polyonax mortuarius – type locality for species
- †Preprismatoolithus
  - †Preprismatoolithus coloradensis
- †Priacodon
  - †Priacodon fruitaensis – type locality for species
- †Prionocyclus
- †Probaena
  - †Probaena sculpta – type locality for species
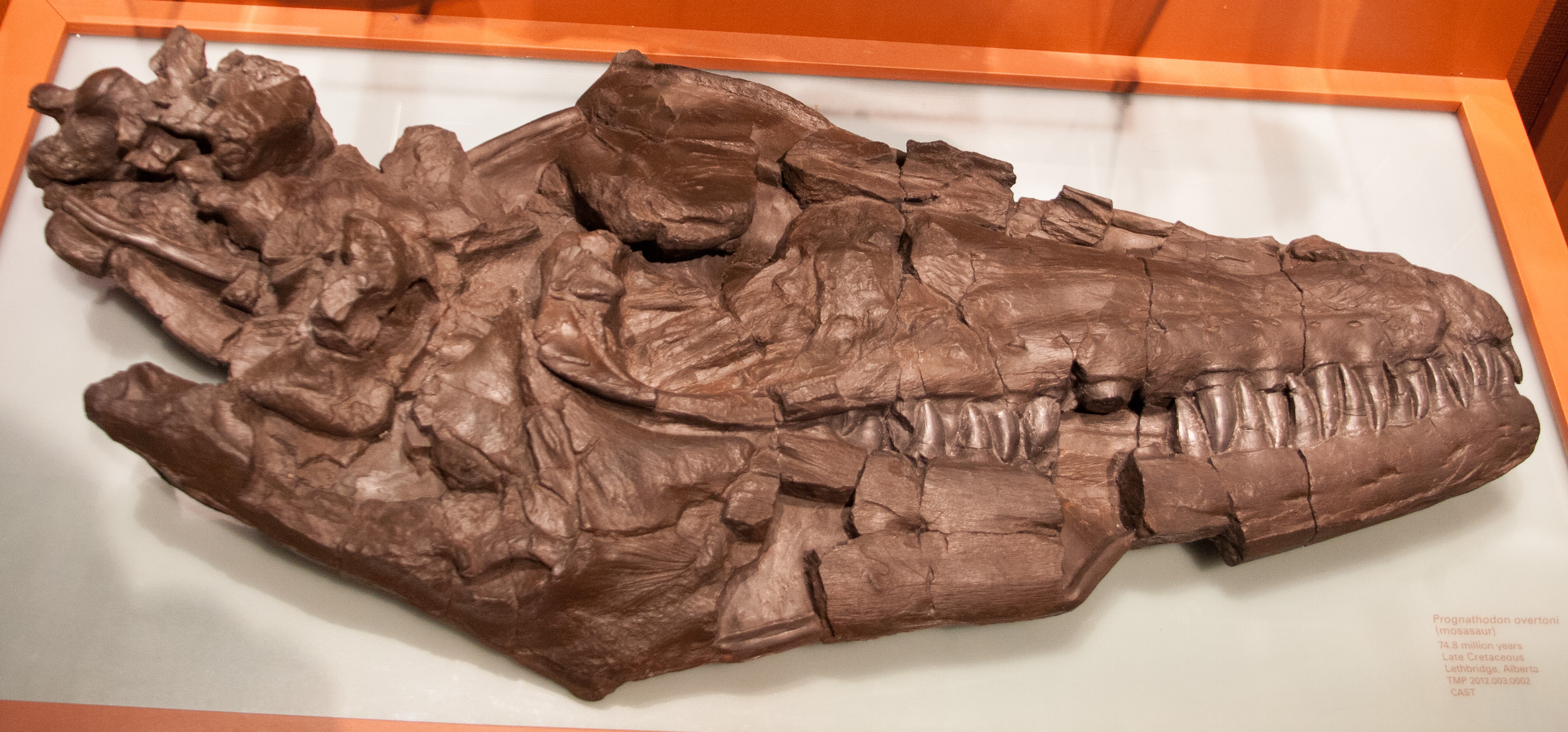
- Fossilized skull of the Late Cretaceous mosasaur Prognathodon
  †Prognathodon
  - †Prognathodon overtoni
  - †Prognathodon stadtmani – type locality for species
- Propeamussium
  - †Propeamussium simplicus
- †Protalphadon
- †Protexanites
  - †Protexanites shoshonensis
- †Protocardia
  - †Protocardia barneyi – type locality for species
- †Protocupressinoxylon
  - †Protocupressinoxylon medlynii – type locality for species
- †Protolambda
  - †Protolambda hatcheri
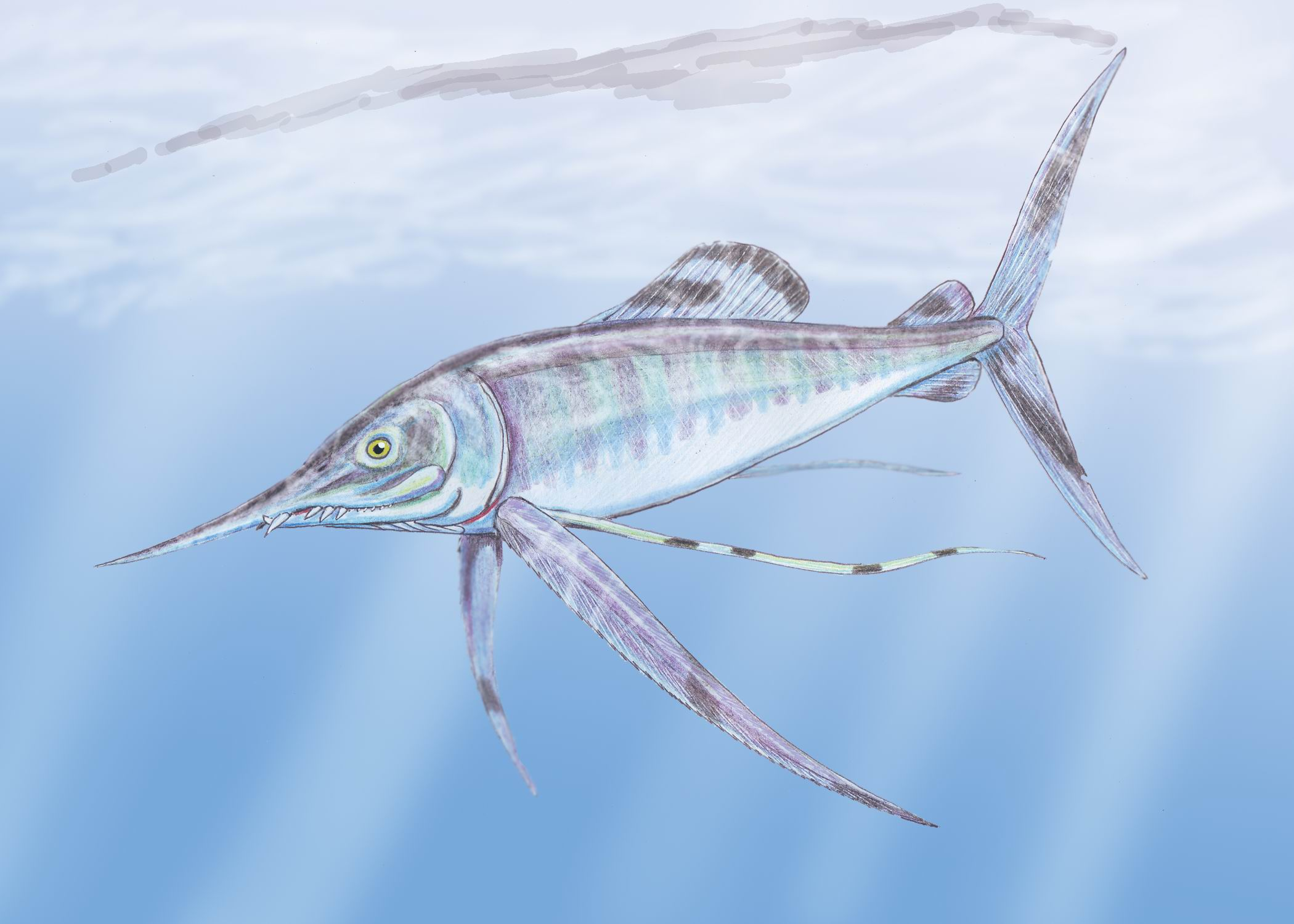
- Life restoration of the Late Cretaceous bony fish Protosphyraena
  †Protosphyraena
- Prunus
  - †Prunus corrugis
- †Pseudaspidoceras
  - †Pseudaspidoceras collignoni
- †Pseudobaculites
- †Pseudocalycoceras
  - †Pseudocalycoceras angolaense
  - †Pseudocalycoceras dentonense
- †Pseudoisurus
  - †Pseudoisurus tomosus – or unidentified comparable form
- †Pseudoperna
  - †Pseudoperna bentonensis
  - †Pseudoperna congesta
  - †Pseudoperna inflatum – type locality for species
- †Pseudotetrasauropus – tentative report
- †Pteraichnus
- †Ptychodus
  - †Ptychodus anonymus
  - †Ptychodus decurrens
  - †Ptychodus occidentalis
  - †Ptychodus whipplei
- †Puebloites
  - †Puebloites spiralis
- Pycnodonte
  - †Pycnodonte newberryi

== R ==
- †Rhaeboceras
  - †Rhaeboceras coloradoense – type locality for species
  - †Rhaeboceras halli
  - †Rhaeboceras subglobosum
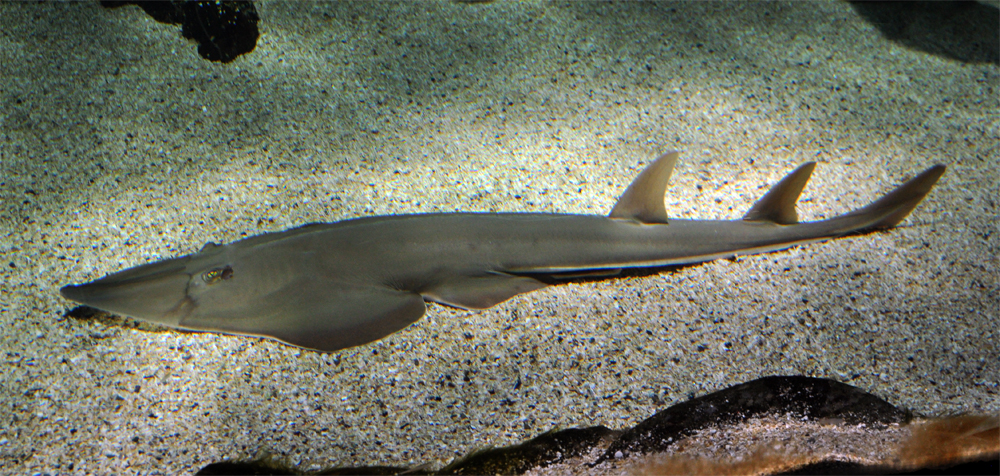
- A living Rhinobatos guitar fish
  Rhinobatos
  - †Rhinobatos incertus
- †Rhynchosauroides
- †Rosselia
- †Rotodactylus

== S ==
- †Sabalites
  - †Sabalites JC016 – informal
  - †Sabalites LA042 – informal
- †Saurillodon
- †Scapherpeton
  - †Scapherpeton tectum
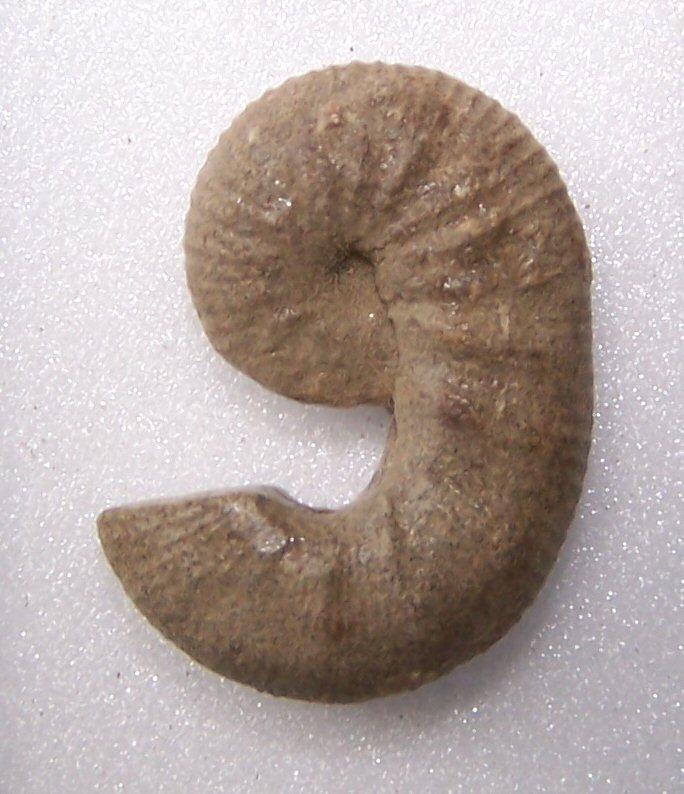
- Fossilized shell of the Late Cretaceous ammonoid cephalopod Scaphites
  †Scaphites
  - †Scaphites binneyi
  - †Scaphites depressus
  - †Scaphites hippocrepis – or unidentified comparable form
  - †Scaphites nodosus
- †Schadipes – type locality for genus
  - †Schadipes crypticus – type locality for species
- †Sciponoceras
  - †Sciponoceras gracile
- †Scoyenia
- †Selaginella
  - †Selaginella JC023 – informal
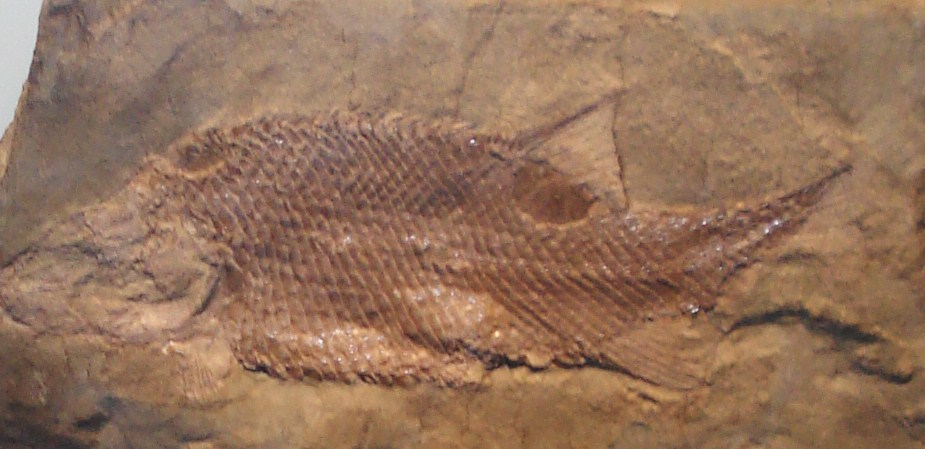
- Fossilized skeleton of the Late Triassic-Early Jurassic bony fish Semionotus
  †Semionotus
- †Solenoceras
  - †Solenoceras larimerense
  - †Solenoceras reesidei – or unidentified comparable form
  - †Solenoceras texanum
- †Sphenodiscus
  - †Sphenodiscus pleurisepta
- †Spiroxybeloceras
  - †Spiroxybeloceras meekanum
- Squalicorax
  - †Squalicorax curvatus
  - †Squalicorax falcatus
  - †Squalicorax pristodontus
- †Squatirhina
  - †Squatirhina americana
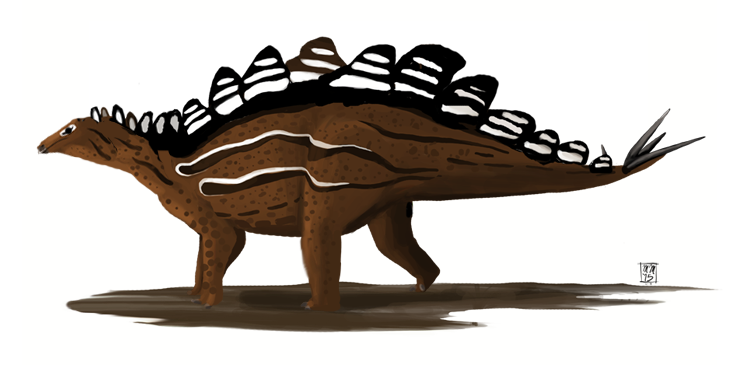
- Restoration of the Late Jurassic stegosaur Stegosaurus
  †Stegosaurus – type locality for genus
  - †Stegosaurus armatus – type locality for species
  - †Stegosaurus stenops – type locality for species
  - †Stegosaurus ungulatus
- †Steinerocaulis
  - †Steinerocaulis radiatus
- †Stenomyti – type locality for genus
  - †Stenomyti huangae – type locality for species
- †Stokesosaurus – or unidentified comparable form
- †Stramentum
  - †Stramentum haworthi
- Sulcoretusa
  - †Sulcoretusa dominici – type locality for species
- †Sumitomoceras
  - †Sumitomoceras bentonianum
  - †Sumitomoceras conlini
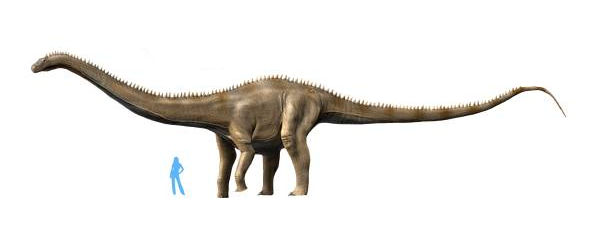
- Restoration in multiple views of the Late Jurassic sauropod dinosaur Supersaurus with an anachronistic human to scale
  †Supersaurus – type locality for genus
  - †Supersaurus vivianae – type locality for species
- †Syncyclonema
  - †Syncyclonema travisanus
- †Synorichthys – type locality for genus
  - †Synorichthys stewarti – type locality for species

== T ==
- †Tanaocrossus – type locality for genus
  - †Tanaocrossus kalliokoskii – type locality for species
- †Tanocrossus
- Tellina
- †Tenea
  - †Tenea parilis
- Teredo
  - †Teredo irregularis
- †Texanites
  - †Texanites americanus
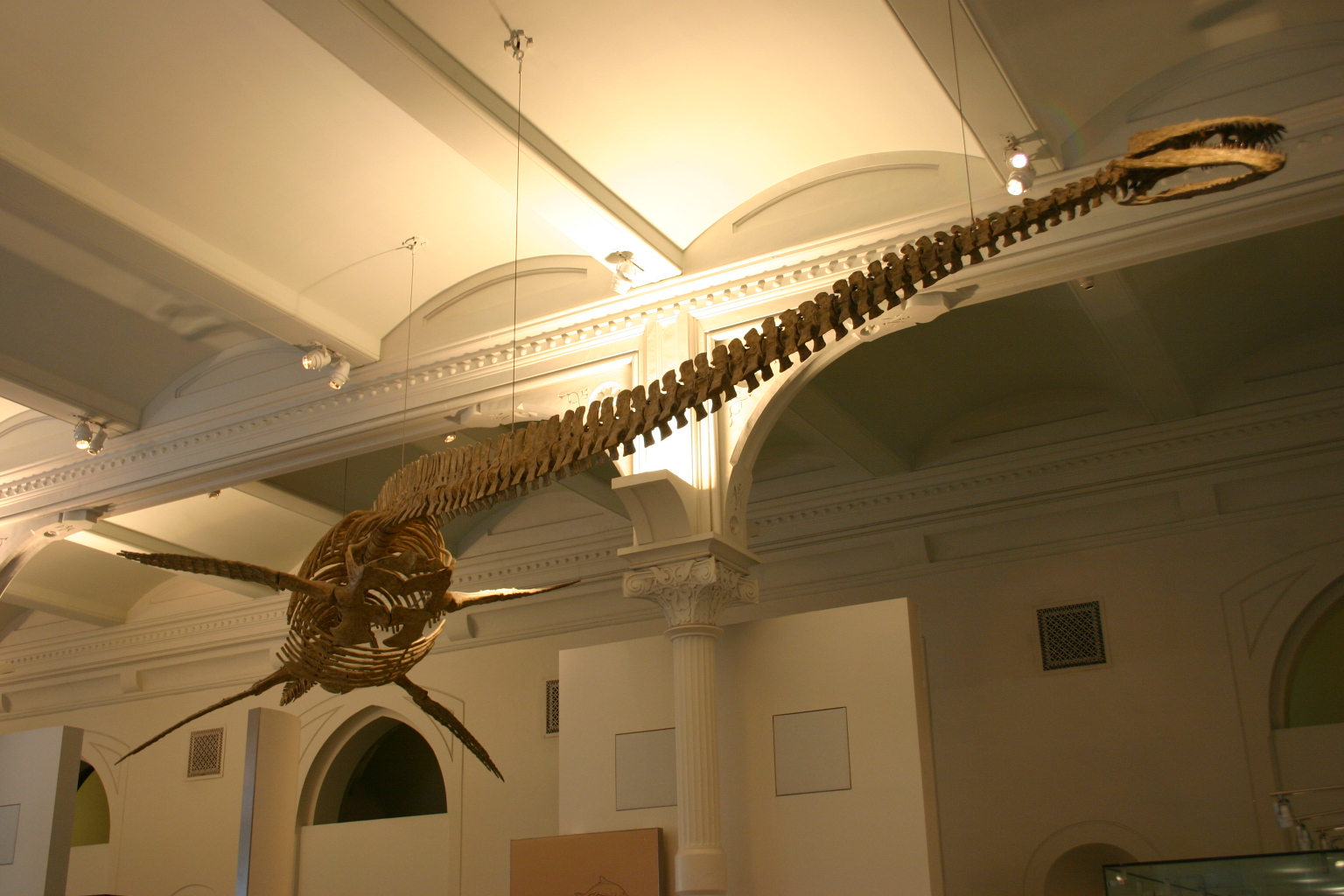
- Fossilized skeleton of the Late Cretaceous plesiosaur Thalassomedon
  †Thalassomedon – type locality for genus
  - †Thalassomedon hanningtoni – type locality for species
- †Theiophytalia – type locality for genus
  - †Theiophytalia kerri – type locality for species
- †Therangospodus – or unidentified comparable form
- †Thescelosaurus
- †Tibiaporrhais
  - †Tibiaporrhais cooperensis
- †Titanosaurus
  - †Titanosaurus montanus – type locality for species
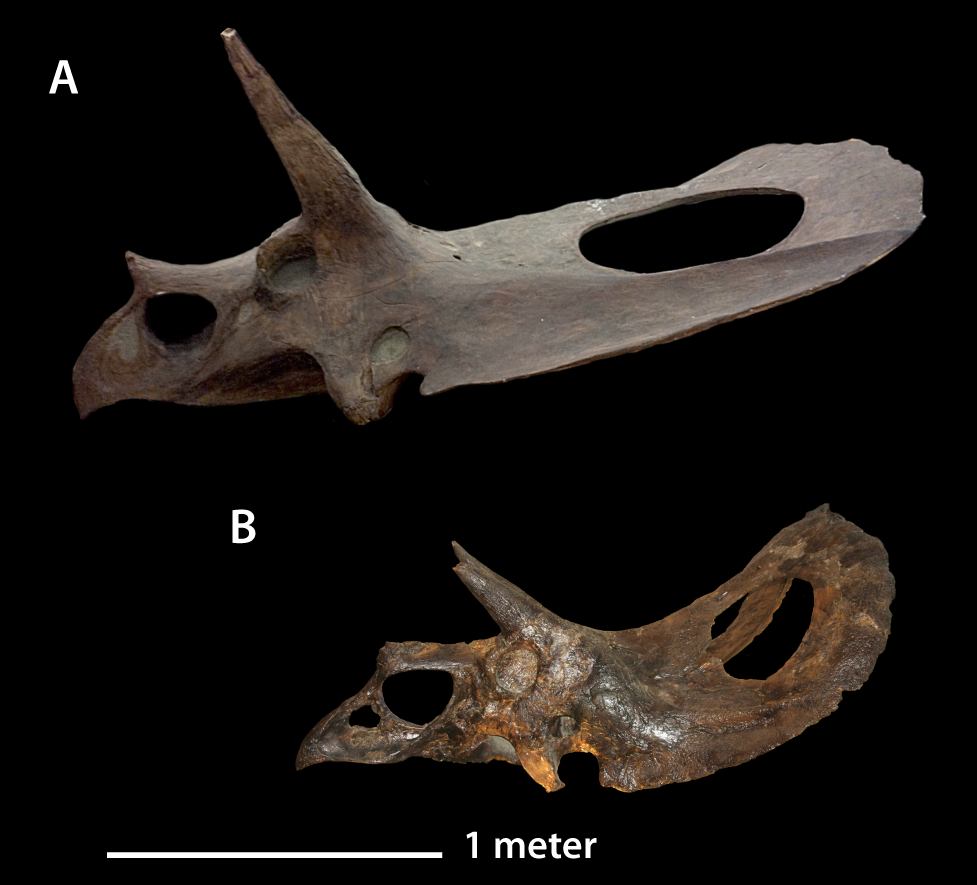
- Fossilized skulls of the Late Cretaceous horned dinosaurs Torosaurus (A) and Triceratops (B) to scale
  †Torosaurus
  - †Torosaurus latus
- †Torvosaurus – type locality for genus
  - †Torvosaurus tanneri – type locality for species
- †Trachybaculites
  - †Trachybaculites columna – or unidentified comparable form
- †Treptichnus
- †Triceratops
  - †Triceratops galeus – type locality for species
  - †Triceratops horridus
- †Trinacromerum – or unidentified comparable form
- Trochocyathus
  - †Trochocyathus egerius
- †Turbinopsis
- Turritella
- †Turseodus
  - †Turseodus dolorensis – type locality for species
- †Tylosaurus
  - †Tylosaurus proriger
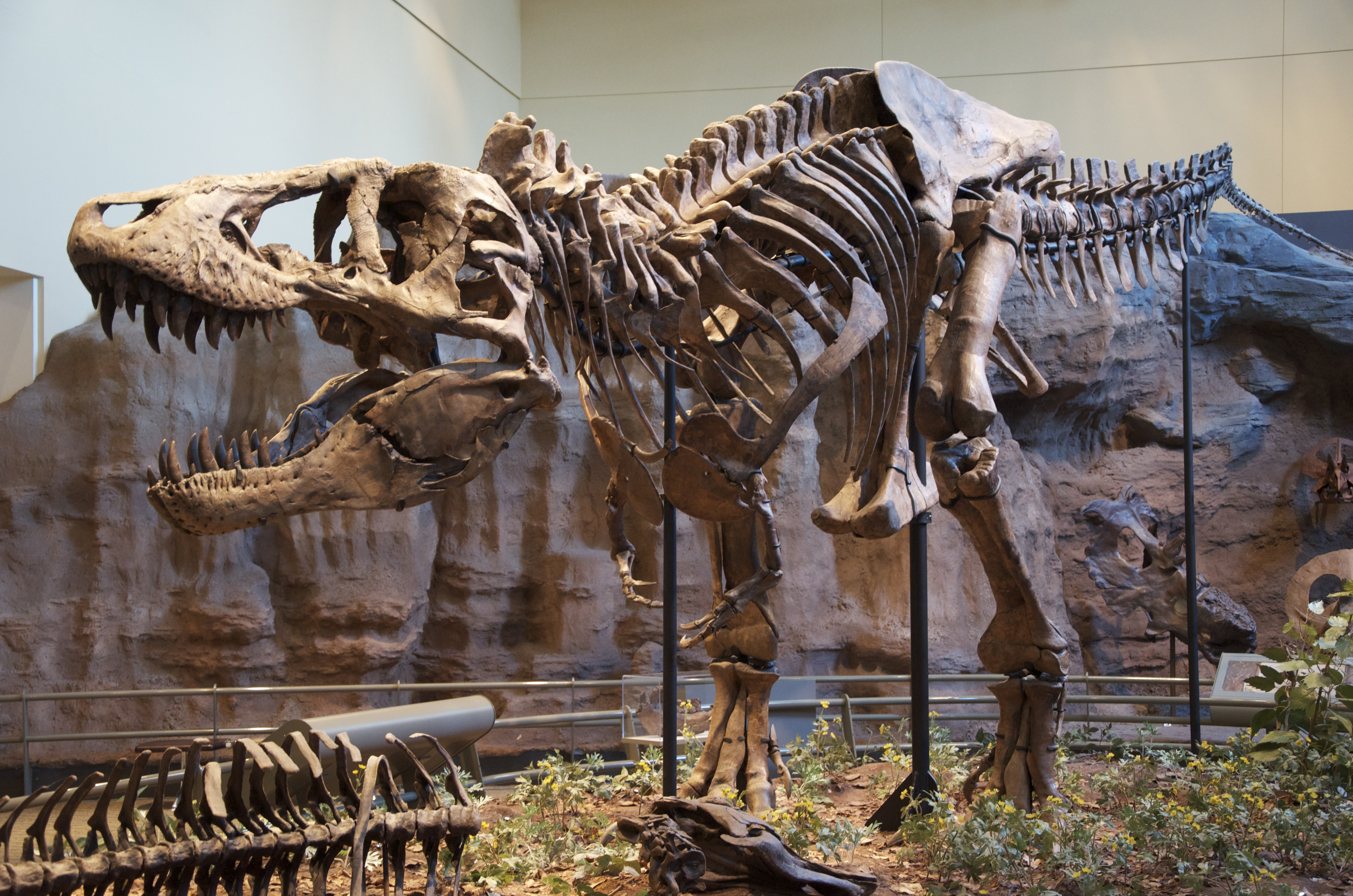
- Fossilized skeleton of the Late Cretaceous tyrannosaur Tyrannosaurus
  †Tyrannosaurus
  - †Tyrannosaurus rex

== V ==
- †Vanikoropsis
  - †Vanikoropsis nebrascensis
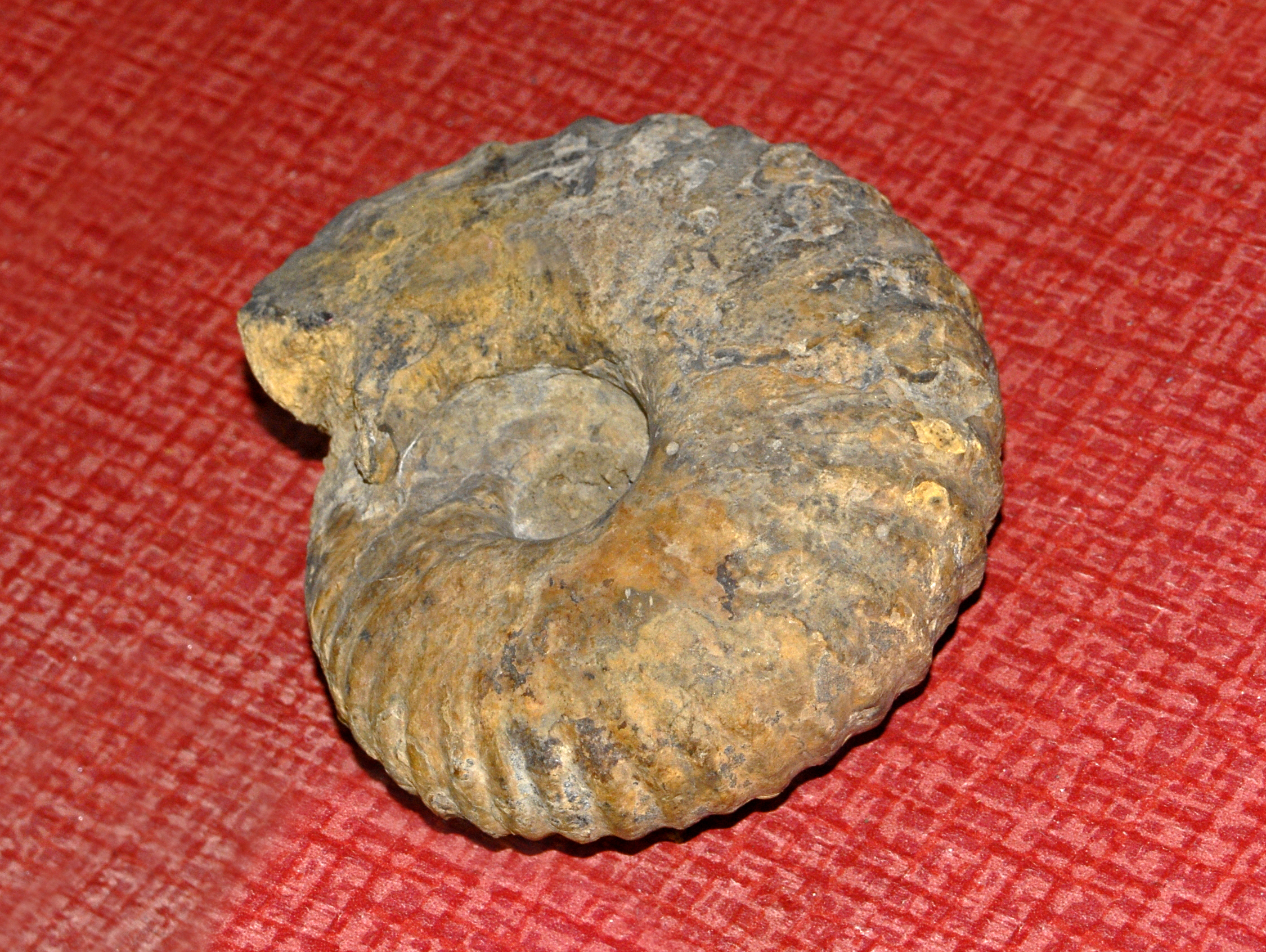
- Fossilized shell of the Late Cretaceous ammonoid cephalopod Vascoceras
  †Vascoceras
  - †Vascoceras birchbyi
- Viviparus
  - †Viviparus reesidei
- †Volviceramus
  - †Volviceramus grandis
  - †Volviceramus involutus
- †Voysa

== W ==
- †Walteria – type locality for genus
  - †Walteria jeffersonensis – type locality for species
  - †Walteria jeffersoni – type locality for species
- †Watinoceras
  - †Watinoceras coloradoense – type locality for species
- †Websteria
  - †Websteria cretacea
- †Worthoceras

== X ==
- †Xenoxylon
  - †Xenoxylon moorei – type locality for species
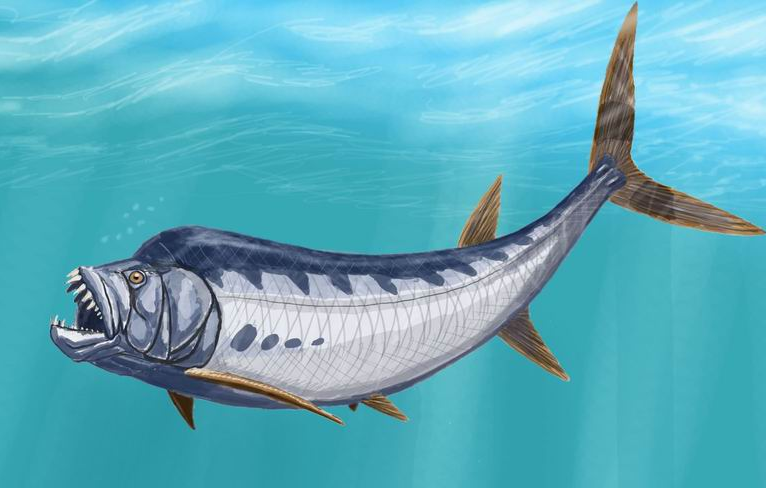
- Life restoration of the Cretaceous bony fish Xiphactinus
  †Xiphactinus
  - †Xiphactinus audax

== Z ==
- †Zyziphus
  - †Zyziphus fibrillosus
  - †Zyziphus LA007 – informal
  - †Zyziphus LA032 – informal
