= Coilopoceras =

Coilopoceras Temporal range: Albian-Turonian ~112–90 Ma

Scientific classification
- Kingdom: Animalia
- Phylum: Mollusca
- Class: Cephalopoda
- Subclass: †Ammonoidea
- Order: †Ammonitida
- Family: †Coilopoceratidae
- Genus: †Coilopoceras; Hyatt, 1903

Type species
- C. colleti

Species
- C. colleti; C. inflatum; C. jenksi; C. leseli; C. newelli; C. zihoricum

Genus of algae (fossil)

Coilopoceras is a compressed, involute, lenticular ammonitid from the Cretaceous (Albian to Turonian), with a narrow venter and raggedy ammonitic suture; type of the Coilopoceratidae, a family in the Acanthoceratoidea of the suborder Ammonitina.

== Distribution ==
Coilopoceras has an established range from the upper Albian to Turonian in the Late Cretaceous. Its distribution is widespread, from western North America (Mexico, New Mexico, Texas) through northern Africa (Egypt, Cameroon, Niger, Nigeria and Tunisia) and Europe (France) to the Middle East (Israel), Madagascar and South America (Brazil, Peru and Colombia; La Frontera and San Rafael Formations).
