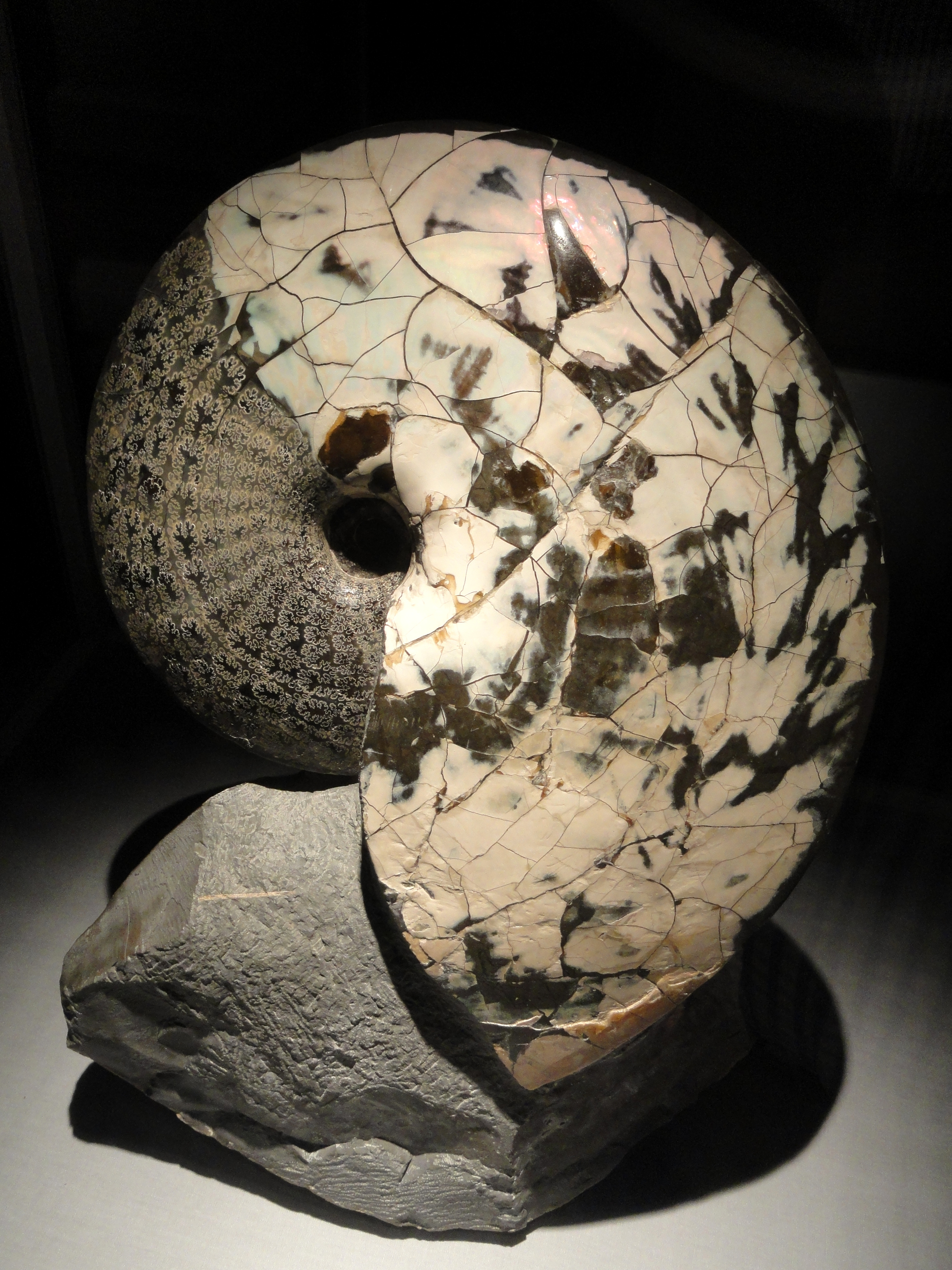
- Herrickiceras costatus (Placenticeras costatum)

Scientific classification
- Kingdom: Animalia
- Phylum: Mollusca
- Class: Cephalopoda
- Subclass: †Ammonoidea
- Order: †Ammonitida
- Superfamily: †Acanthoceratoidea
- Family: †Coilopoceratidae; Hyatt, 1903

Genera
- See text

= Coilopoceratidae =

Coilopoceratidae Temporal range: Albian–Turonian

Family of mollusc (fossil)

Coilopoceratidae is a family of generally large, proper ammonites with strongly involute shells from the Cretaceous, Albian to Turonian. Coilopoceratids have variably compressed shells with flattish to broadly rounded sides and narrowly rounded to sharp keel-like venters. Whorl sections are generally lanceolate. The suture is ammonitic with an overall clumpy appearance.

The Coilopoceratidae are derived from the Tissotiidae by a secondary re-development of an ammonitic suture and of more narrowly compressed shells.

== Genera ==
- Coilopoceras Hyatt, 1903 (synonym = Glebosoceras Reyment, 1954) - from north and west Africa, Syria, Baluchistan, and western North America (Colorado, New Mexico, Texas).
- Herrickiceras Cobban & Hook, 1980 - from Western North America, central Africa, and the Middle East.
- Hoplitoides von Koenen, 1898 – from north and west Africa, Syria, Columbia, Peru, western North America.
