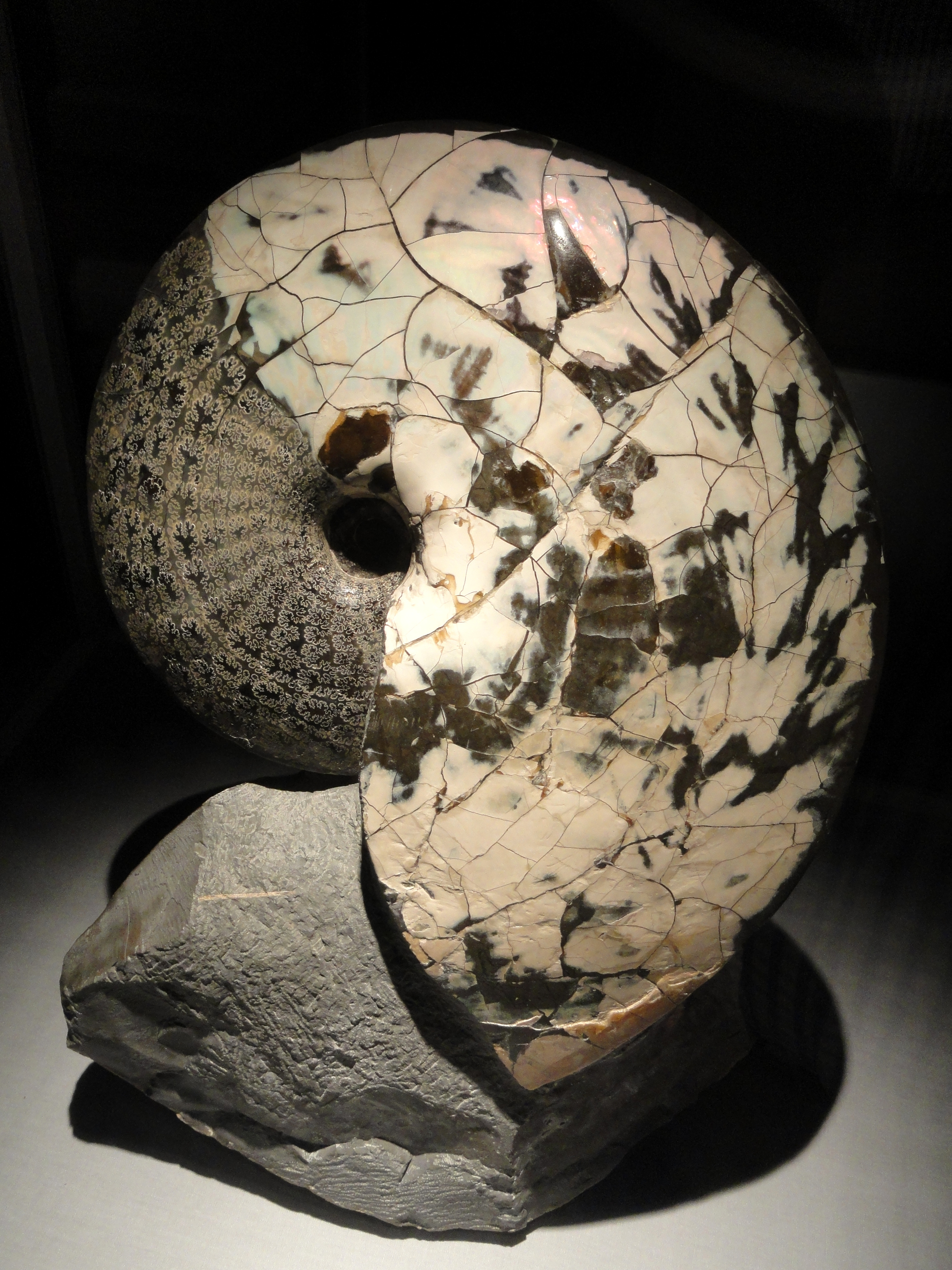
- Herrickiceras costatus (Placenticeras costatum)

Scientific classification
- Kingdom: Animalia
- Phylum: Mollusca
- Class: Cephalopoda
- Subclass: †Ammonoidea
- Order: †Ammonitida
- Family: †Coilopoceratidae
- Genus: †Herrickiceras; Cobban & Hook, 1980

Species
- See text

= Herrickiceras =

Herrickiceras Temporal range: Middle Turonian 93.5–89.3 Ma

Genus of algae (fossil)

Herrickiceras is an ammonite from the Upper Cretaceous which belongs to the Coilopoceratidae, a family within the superfamily Acanthoceratoidea. Herrickiceras has an established range in the Middle Turonian of the Upper Cretaceous. Its distribution is widespread, from western North America through Central Africa and the Middle East.

Species include:

- H. costatum (type species)
