= Squatirhina =

Scientific classification
- Kingdom: Animalia
- Phylum: Chordata
- Class: Chondrichthyes
- Order: Rajiformes
- Family: incertae sedis
- Genus: †Squatirhina Casier, 1947

Type species
- †Squatirhina lonzeensis Casier, 1947

Other species
- †S. westfalica Müller & Diedrich, 1991; †S. thiesi Biddle, 1993; †S. kannensis Herman, 1977; †S. draytoni Guinot, Cappetta, Underwood & Ward, 2012

Extinct genus of cartilaginous fishes

Squatirhina is a genus of rajiforms that lived in Late Cretaceous, whose fossils have been found in the Aguja and Pen Formations of Big Bend National Park, Texas, USA.

== See also ==
- List of prehistoric cartilaginous fish
