= 2013 in paleomalacology =

This list, 2013 in molluscan paleontology, is a list of new taxa of ammonites and other fossil cephalopods, as well as fossil gastropods, bivalves and other molluscs that have been described during the year 2013.

== Ammonites ==
Name	Novelty	Status	Authors	Age	Unit	Location	Notes	Images
Albarracinites submediterraneus	Sp nov	Valid	Fernandez-Lopez	Middle Jurassic (early Bajocian)		Spain	A species of Albarracinites.	
Alborzites binaludensis	Sp. nov	Valid	Seyed-Emami in Seyed-Emami et al.	Jurassic	Dalichai Formation	Iran	A species of Alborzites.	
Anasibirites simanenkoi	Sp. nov	Valid	Zakharov & Smyshlyaeva in Zakharov et al.	Early Triassic (Olenekian)	Zhitkov Cape Formation	Russia	A prionitid, a species of Anasibirites.	
Anasirenites crassicrenulatus	Sp. nov	Valid	Lukeneder & Lukeneder	Triassic (late Carnian)	Kasimlar Formation	Turkey	A sirenitine trachyceratid, a species of Anasirenites.	
Anawasatchites specious	Sp. nov	Valid	Zakharov & Smyshlyaeva in Zakharov et al.	Early Triassic (Olenekian)	Zhitkov Cape Formation	Russia	A prionitid, a species of Anawasatchites.	
Anetoceras mittmeyeri	Sp. nov	Valid	De Baets et al.	Devonian (Emsian)		Germany	A species of Anetoceras.	
Argentoscaphites corrugatus	Sp nov	Valid	Kennedy & Klinger	Late Cretaceous (Santonian to early Campanian)	Mzamba Formation	South Africa	A scaphitid ammonite, a species of Argentoscaphites.	
Artareites kerkhofae	Sp. nov	Valid	Vermeulen et al.	Early Cretaceous		France	A member of the family Acrioceratidae.	
Australiceras himalayense	Sp. nov	Valid	Lukeneder, Suttner & Bertle	Early Cretaceous (Aptian–Albian)	Giumal Formation	India	A member of the family Ancyloceratidae.	
Barrancyloceras coglievinai	Sp. nov	Valid	Vermeulen et al.	Early Cretaceous		France	A member of the family Hemihoplitidae.	
Brayardites involutus	Sp. nov	Valid	Zakharov & Smyshlyaeva in Zakharov et al.	Early Triassic (Olenekian)	Zhitkov Cape Formation	Russia	An arctoceratid, a species of Brayardites.	
Bulunites gracilis	Sp. nov	Valid	Kutygin & Ganelin	Early Permian	Munugudzhakian Formation	Russia	A species of Bulunites.	
"Caenisites" subtilis	Sp. nov	Valid	Meister & Schlögl	Early Jurassic (Sinemurian)		Slovakia		
Caseyhoplites	Gen. et comb. nov	Valid	Cooper & Owen	Early Cretaceous (early Albian)		United Kingdom	A sonneratiid hoplitoid, a new genus for the species "Otohoplites" waltoni Casey (1965).	
?Chigaroceras szomodi	Sp. nov	Valid	Szives & Főzy	Early Cretaceous (Berriasian)	Szentivánhegy Limestone Formation	Hungary		
Cleoniceras oberhauseri	Sp. nov	Valid	Lukeneder, Suttner & Bertle	Early Cretaceous (Aptian–Albian)	Giumal Formation	India		
Coroniceras (Eucoroniceras) enorme	Sp. nov	Valid	Meister & Schlögl	Early Jurassic (Sinemurian)		Slovakia		
Coroniceras (Eucoroniceras) hornaceki	Sp. nov	Valid	Meister & Schlögl	Early Jurassic (Sinemurian)		Slovakia		
Coroniceras (Eucoroniceras) ingridae	Sp. nov	Valid	Meister & Schlögl	Early Jurassic (Sinemurian)		Slovakia		
Coroniceras (Pararnioceras) arnioceroides	Sp. nov	Valid	Meister & Schlögl	Early Jurassic (Sinemurian)		Slovakia		
Coroniceras (Pararnioceras) nedzoviense	Sp. nov	Valid	Meister & Schlögl	Early Jurassic (Sinemurian)		Slovakia		
Crioceratites (Balearites) oicasensis	Sp. nov	Valid	Hoedemaeker	Early Cretaceous		Slovakia; Spain; France?		
Crioceratites (Balearites) theodomirensis	Sp. nov	Valid	Hoedemaeker	Early Cretaceous		France; Hungary; Slovakia; Spain		
Crioceratites (Binelliceras) angulicostatiformis	Nom. nov	Valid	Hoedemaeker	Early Cretaceous (Hauterivian)		France	A replacement name for "Crioceras" angulicostatum Kilian (1888).	
Cymahoplites hohendorfensis	Sp. nov	Valid	Lehmann, Owen & Beckert	Early Cretaceous (Albian)		Germany	A member of Cleoniceratidae belonging to the subfamily Vnigriceratinae.	
Darkaoceras velox	Sp. nov	Valid	Bockwinkel, Becker & Ebbighausen	Devonian (late Givetian)		Morocco	A taouzitid, a species of Darkaoceras.	
Defayella	Gen. et 2 sp. et comb. nov	Valid	Vermeulen et al.	Early Cretaceous		Czech Republic; France; Romania	A member of the family Anahamulinidae. The type species is D. dubalae; genus also includes new species D. thieuloyi, as well as "Hamites" poni Simionescu (1898) and Defayella dittleri (Vasicek, 1972).	
Deshayesites fuchsi	Sp. nov	Valid	Lukeneder, Suttner & Bertle	Early Cretaceous (Aptian–Albian)	Giumal Formation	India	A member of Ancyloceratina belonging to the family Deshayesitidae.	
Dombarites taishakuensis	Sp. nov	Valid	Ehiro, Nishikawa & Nishikawa	Early Carboniferous (probably early Serpukhovian)	Dangyokei Formation	Japan	A species of Dombarites.	
Dragunoviceras	Gen. et comb. nov	Valid	Cooper & Owen	Early Cretaceous (early Albian)		Kazakhstan	A sonneratiid hoplitoid, a new genus for the species "Tetrahoplites" dragunovi Savel'ev (1960).	
Euflemingites extremus	Sp. nov	Valid	Smyshlyaeva & Zakharov	Early Triassic (Olenekian)		Russia	A flemingitid, a species of Euflemingites.	
Flemingites alexanderi	Sp. nov	Valid	Smyshlyaeva & Zakharov	Early Triassic (Olenekian)		Russia	A flemingitid, a species of Flemingites.	
Flemingites trikamnyaensis	Sp. nov	Valid	Smyshlyaeva & Zakharov	Early Triassic (Olenekian)		Russia	A flemingitid, a species of Flemingites.	
Franchia subalpina	Sp. nov	Valid	Fernandez-Lopez & Pavia	Middle Jurassic (Bathonian)		France	A zigzagiceratine perisphinctid, a species of Franchia.	
Gassendiceras bosellii	Sp. nov	Valid	Bert et al.	Early Cretaceous (Barremian)		France; Morocco	A hemihoplitid ancyloceratoid, a species of Gassendiceras.	
Gassendiceras rebouleti	Sp. nov	Valid	Bert et al.	Early Cretaceous (Barremian)		France; Morocco?	A hemihoplitid ancyloceratoid, a species of Gassendiceras.	
Gaudryceras hobetsense	Sp. nov	Valid	Shigeta & Nishimura	Late Cretaceous (earliest Maastrichtian)		Japan	A gaudryceratid, a species of Gaudryceras.	
Giumaliceras	Gen. et 2 sp. nov	Valid	Lukeneder, Suttner & Bertle	Early Cretaceous (Berriasian–Valanginian)	Giumal Formation	India	A member of the family Neocomitidae. The type species is G. giumaliense; genus also includes G. bhargavai.	
Gyroceratites heinricherbeni	Sp. nov	Valid	De Baets et al.	Devonian (Emsian)		Germany	A species of Gyroceratites.	
Herbichiceras	Gen. et comb. nov	Valid	Főzy & Scherzinger	Late Jurassic (Kimmeridgian)		Hungary	Genus includes "Perisphinctes" tantalus Herbich (1878).	
Himalayites tardosi	Sp. nov	Valid	Szives & Főzy	Early Cretaceous (Berriasian)		Hungary		
Hoploscaphites gilberti	Sp. nov	Valid	Landman et al.	Late Cretaceous (Campanian)	Pierre Shale	United States	A scaphitid, a species of Hoploscaphites.	
Hypophylloceras (Neophylloceras) arturoi	Sp. nov	Valid	Ifrim, Stinnesbeck & Ventura	Late Cretaceous (early Campanian)		Mexico	A species of Hypophylloceras.	
Inyoites beaverensis	Sp. nov	Valid	Brayard et al.	Early Triassic		United States	A species of Inyoites.	
Inyoites sedini	Sp nov	Valid	Zakharov & Abnavi	Early Triassic (Olenekian)	Zhitkov Formation	Russia	An inyoitid, a species of Inyoites.	
Ivoites opitzi	Sp. nov	Valid	De Baets et al.	Devonian (Emsian)		Germany	A species of Ivoites.	
Ivoites schindewolfi	Sp. nov	Valid	De Baets et al.	Devonian (Emsian)		Germany	A species of Ivoites.	
Kashmirites confusionensis	Sp. nov	Valid	Brayard et al.	Early Triassic		United States	A species of Kashmirites.	
Kashmirites shevyrevi	Sp. nov	Valid	Zakharov & Smyshlyaeva in Zakharov et al.	Early Triassic (Olenekian)	Zhitkov Cape Formation	Russia	A xenoceltitid, a species of Kashmirites.	
Kashmirites stepheni	Sp. nov	Valid	Brayard et al.	Early Triassic		United States	A species of Kashmirites.	
Kashmirites utahensis	Sp. nov	Valid	Brayard et al.	Early Triassic		United States	A species of Kashmirites.	
Kasimlarceltites	Gen. et sp. nov	Valid	Lukeneder & Lukeneder	Triassic (early Carnian)	Kasimlar Formation	Turkey	A celtitid, a member of Ceratitaceae. The type species is Kasimlarceltites krystyni.	
Klipsteinia disciformis	Sp. nov	Valid	Lukeneder & Lukeneder	Triassic (early Carnian)	Kasimlar Formation	Turkey	An arpaditid ceratitid, a species of Klipsteinia.	
Lahonderella	Gen. et sp. et comb. nov	Valid	Vermeulen et al.	Early Cretaceous		France; Switzerland	A member of the family Hamulinidae. The type species is L. gouvenauxae; genus also includes "Schaffhauseria" veveysensis Vermeulen et al. (2012).	
Leptoceratoides barralensis	Sp. nov	Valid	Vermeulen et al.	Early Cretaceous		France	A member of the family Leptoceratoididae.	
Lobotornoceras bensaidi	Sp. nov	Valid	Bockwinkel, Becker & Ebbighausen	Devonian (late Givetian)		Morocco	A tornoceratine tornoceratid, a species of Lobotornoceras.	
Lunupharciceras incisum	Sp. nov	Valid	Bockwinkel, Becker & Ebbighausen	Devonian (late Givetian)		Morocco	A pharciceratine pharciceratid, a species of Lunupharciceras.	
Meekoceras millardense	Sp. nov	Valid	Brayard et al.	Early Triassic		United States	A species of Meekoceras.	
Meekoceras olivieri	Sp. nov	Valid	Brayard et al.	Early Triassic		United States	A species of Meekoceras.	
Megazigzagiceras	Gen. et sp. nov	Valid	Fernandez-Lopez & Pavia	Middle Jurassic (Bathonian)		Saudi Arabia	A zigzagiceratine perisphinctid. The type species is Megazigzagiceras subarabicum.	
Mesohedenstroemia olgae	Sp nov	Valid	Zakharov & Abnavi	Early Triassic (Olenekian)	Zhitkov Formation	Russia	A hedenstroemiid, a species of Mesohedenstroemia.	
Metabactrites fuchsi	Sp. nov	Valid	De Baets et al.	Devonian (Emsian)		Germany	A species of Metabactrites.	
Metarnioceras capricornoides	Sp. nov	Valid	Meister & Schlögl	Early Jurassic (Sinemurian)		Slovakia		
Mianwaliites zimini	Sp. nov	Valid	Zakharov & Smyshlyaeva in Zakharov et al.	Early Triassic (Olenekian)	Zhitkov Cape Formation	Russia	A palaeophyllitid, a species of Mianwaliites.	
Minersvillites	Gen. et sp. nov	Valid	Brayard et al.	Early Triassic		United States	The type species is Minersvillites farai.	
Monneticeras kalinkini	Sp. nov	Valid	Zakharov & Smyshlyaeva in Zakharov et al.	Early Triassic (Olenekian)	Zhitkov Cape Formation	Russia	A proptychitid, a species of Monneticeras.	
Montanesiceras breskovskii	Sp. nov	Valid	Vašíček et al.	Early Cretaceous (late Barremian)	Donji Milanovac Formation	Serbia	A barremitid desmoceratoid, a species of Montanesiceras.	
Nebechoceras	Gen. et sp. nov	Valid	Bockwinkel, Becker & Ebbighausen	Devonian (late Givetian)		Morocco	A falcitornoceratine tornoceratid. The type species is Nebechoceras eccentricum.	
Neocomites (Eristavites) platycostatiformis	Sp. nov	Valid	Lukeneder, Suttner & Bertle	Early Cretaceous (Berriasian–Valanginian)	Giumal Formation	India	A member of the family Neocomitidae.	
Neoshumardites munugudzhensis	Sp. nov	Valid	Kutygin & Ganelin	Early Permian	Munugudzhakian Formation	Russia	A species of Neoshumardites.	
Neoshumardites? nassichuki	Sp. nov	Valid	Kutygin & Ganelin	Early Permian	Munugudzhakian Formation	Russia	Possibly a species of Neoshumardites.	
Neotohoplites	Gen. et comb. nov	Valid	Cooper & Owen	Early Cretaceous (early Albian)		France	A sonneratiid hoplitoid, a new genus for the species "Otohoplites" bulliensis Destombes (1973).	
Paramacroscaphites densecostatum	Sp. nov	Valid	Vermeulen et al.	Early Cretaceous		France	A member of the family Macroscaphitidae.	
Pharciceras decoratum	Sp. nov	Valid	Bockwinkel, Becker & Ebbighausen	Devonian (late Givetian)		Morocco	A pharciceratine pharciceratid, a species of Pharciceras.	
Pharciceras fornix	Sp. nov	Valid	Bockwinkel, Becker & Ebbighausen	Devonian (late Givetian)		Morocco	A pharciceratine pharciceratid, a species of Pharciceras.	
Pharciceras involutum	Sp. nov	Valid	Bockwinkel, Becker & Ebbighausen	Devonian (late Givetian)		Morocco	A pharciceratine pharciceratid, a species of Pharciceras.	
Pharciceras oberscheldense	Sp. nov	Valid	Bockwinkel & Korn in Bockwinkel et al.	Devonian (late Givetian)		Germany		
Pharciceras subconstans	Sp. nov	Valid	Bockwinkel, Becker & Ebbighausen	Devonian (late Givetian)		Morocco	A pharciceratine pharciceratid, a species of Pharciceras.	
Phoenixites lenticulus	Sp. nov	Valid	Bockwinkel, Becker & Ebbighausen	Devonian (late Givetian)		Morocco	A falcitornoceratine tornoceratid, a species of Phoenixites.	
Plesiospitidiscus boljetinensis	Sp. nov	Valid	Vašíček et al.	Early Cretaceous (late Barremian)	Donji Milanovac Formation	Serbia	A barremitid desmoceratoid, a species of Plesiospitidiscus.	
Pluripharciceras	Gen. et comb. et sp. nov	Valid	Bockwinkel, Becker & Ebbighausen	Devonian (late Givetian)		Morocco	A synpharciceratine pharciceratid. A new genus for "Synpharciceras" plurilobatum Petter (1959); genus also contains a new species Pluripharciceras orbis.	
Prionites markevichi	Sp. nov	Valid	Zakharov & Smyshlyaeva in Zakharov et al.	Early Triassic (Olenekian)	Zhitkov Cape Formation	Russia	A prionitid, a species of Prionites.	
Prionites subtuberculatus	Sp. nov	Valid	Zakharov & Smyshlyaeva in Zakharov et al.	Early Triassic (Olenekian)	Zhitkov Cape Formation	Russia	A prionitid, a species of Prionites.	
Protozigzagiceras densum	Sp. nov	Valid	Fernandez-Lopez & Pavia	Middle Jurassic (Bathonian)		France	A zigzagiceratine perisphinctid, a species of Protozigzagiceras.	
Protozigzagiceras flexum	Sp. nov	Valid	Fernandez-Lopez & Pavia	Middle Jurassic (Bathonian)		France	A zigzagiceratine perisphinctid, a species of Protozigzagiceras.	
Protozigzagiceras tethycum	Sp. nov	Valid	Fernandez-Lopez & Pavia	Middle Jurassic (Bathonian)		France	A zigzagiceratine perisphinctid, a species of Protozigzagiceras.	
Pseudobarrancyloceras	Gen. et comb. nov	Valid	Vermeulen et al.	Early Cretaceous		France	A member of the family Ancyloceratidae. The type species is "Barrancyloceras" companyi Vermeulen & Lazarin (2007); genus also includes Pseudobarrancyloceras bailensis Vermeulen (1996).	
Pseudolillia paralleliformis	Sp. nov.	Valid	Kovács	Early Jurassic (Toarcian)		Hungary	A member of the family Hildoceratidae belonging to the subfamily Grammoceratinae.	
Pseudoprobeloceras praecox	Sp. nov	Valid	Bockwinkel, Becker & Ebbighausen	Devonian (late Givetian)		Morocco	A ponticeratine acanthoclymeniid, a species of Pseudoprobeloceras.	
Pseudothurmannia (Kakabadziella)	Subgen. et comb. et 2 sp. et subsp. nov	Valid	Hoedemaeker	Early Cretaceous		Austria; Bulgaria; Crimean Peninsula; France; Germany; Georgia; Hungary; Italy; Romania; Slovakia; Spain; Switzerland	The type species is "Ammonites" mortilleti Pictet & De Loriol (1858); the subgenus also includes new species Pseudothurmannia (Kakabadziella) caravacaensis and Pseudothurmannia (Kakabadziella) tornajensis, as well as "Hoplites" catulloi Parona (1897), Pseudothurmannia belimelensis Dimitrova (1967) and "Ammonites" ohmi Winkler (1868) (including new subspecies Pseudothurmannia (Kakabadziella) ohmi valbonnettensis).	
Pseudothurmannia (Parathurmannia) dissiticostata	Sp. nov	Valid	Hoedemaeker	Early Cretaceous		Spain; Switzerland		
Pseudothurmannia (Pseudothurmannia) arundicostata	Sp. nov	Valid	Hoedemaeker	Early Cretaceous		France; Spain		
Pseudothurmannia (Pseudothurmannia) perevoluta	Sp. nov	Valid	Hoedemaeker	Early Cretaceous		Bulgaria; France; Spain		
Ptychoceras baci	Sp. nov	Valid	Vermeulen et al.	Early Cretaceous		France	A member of the family Ptychoceratidae.	
Ptychoceras subinornatum	Sp. nov	Valid	Vermeulen et al.	Early Cretaceous		France	A member of the family Ptychoceratidae.	
Rohillites? ambiguus	Sp. nov	Valid	Smyshlyaeva & Zakharov	Early Triassic (Olenekian)		Russia	A flemingitid, possibly a species of Rohillites.	
Sabaudiella babinoti	Sp. nov	Valid	Vermeulen et al.	Early Cretaceous		France	A member of the family Leptoceratoididae.	
Sabaudiella paulae	Sp. nov	Valid	Vermeulen et al.	Early Cretaceous		France	A member of the family Leptoceratoididae.	
Scaturites	Gen. et sp. nov	Valid	Bockwinkel, Becker & Ebbighausen	Devonian (late Givetian)		Morocco	An acanthoclymeniine acanthoclymeniid. The type species is Scaturites minutus.	
Simoceras agostyani	Sp. nov	Valid	Főzy & Scherzinger	Late Jurassic (Tithonian)	Szentivánhegy Limestone Formation	Hungary		
Sinzovia franki	Sp. nov	Valid	Lukeneder, Suttner & Bertle	Early Cretaceous (Aptian–Albian)	Giumal Formation	India	A member of Haploceratoidea belonging to the family Aconeceratidae.	
Stenopharciceras progressum	Sp. nov	Valid	Bockwinkel, Becker & Ebbighausen	Devonian (late Givetian)		Morocco	A synpharciceratine pharciceratid, a species of Stenopharciceras.	
Stoliczkaia (Shumarinaia) australe	Sp. nov	Valid	Kennedy & Klinger	Late Cretaceous (early Cenomanian)	Mzinene Formation	South Africa	A member of Lyelliceratidae, a species of Stoliczkaia. This species, or a closely related species, also occurs in South India.	
Subbalhaeceras	Gen. et sp. nov	Valid	Zakharov & Abnavi	Early Triassic (Olenekian)	Zhitkov Formation	Russia	A flemingitid. The type species is Subbalhaeceras shigetai.	
Synpharciceras frequens	Sp. nov	Valid	Bockwinkel, Becker & Ebbighausen	Devonian (late Givetian)		Morocco	A synpharciceratine pharciceratid, a species of Synpharciceras.	
Tetragonites silencioensis	Sp. nov	Valid	Ifrim, Stinnesbeck & Ventura	Late Cretaceous (early Campanian)		Mexico	A species of Tetragonites.	
Torcapella serbiensis	Sp. nov	Valid	Vašíček et al.	Early Cretaceous (late Barremian)	Donji Milanovac Formation	Serbia	A barremitid desmoceratoid, a species of Torcapella.	
Transpharciceras	Gen. et sp. nov	Valid	Bockwinkel, Becker & Ebbighausen	Devonian (late Givetian)		Morocco	A pharciceratine pharciceratid. The type species is Transpharciceras procedens.	
Ussuriaspenites	Gen. et sp. nov	Valid	Zakharov & Smyshlyaeva in Zakharov et al.	Early Triassic (Olenekian)	Zhitkov Cape Formation	Russia	An aspenitid. The type species is Ussuriaspenites evlanovi.	
Vercherites undulatus	Sp. nov	Valid	Brayard et al.	Early Triassic		United States	A species of Vercherites.	
Veveysiceras arbeitae	Sp. nov	Valid	Vermeulen et al.	Early Cretaceous		France	A member of the family Leptoceratoididae.	
Xenoceltites? subvariocostatus	Sp. nov	Valid	Zakharov & Smyshlyaeva in Zakharov et al.	Early Triassic (Olenekian)	Zhitkov Cape Formation	Russia	A xenoceltitid, possibly a species of Xenoceltites.	
Xerticeras	Gen. et sp. nov	Valid	Delanoy et al.	Early Cretaceous (lower Aptian)		Spain	An ancyloceratid. The type species is Xerticeras salasi.	
?Xiaoqiaoceras americanum	Sp. nov	Valid	Brayard et al.	Early Triassic		United States	Possibly a species of Xiaoqiaoceras.	
Yezoites australis	Sp nov	Valid	Kennedy & Klinger	Late Cretaceous (late Santonian)	Mzamba Formation; St Lucia Formation	South Africa	A scaphitid ammonite, a species of Yezoites.	
Yezoites concinna	Sp nov	Valid	Kennedy & Klinger	Late Cretaceous (middle Coniacian)	St Lucia Formation	South Africa	A scaphitid ammonite, a species of Yezoites.	

== Other cephalopods ==
Name	Novelty	Status	Authors	Age	Unit	Location	Notes	Images
Acroteuthis pseudoconoides	Sp. nov	Valid	Dzyuba	Jurassic-Cretaceous boundary (Volgian to Ryazanian)		Russia	A cylindroteuthidid belemnite, a species of Acroteuthis.	
Aegyptosaepia	Gen. et sp. nov	Valid	Košťák et al.	Paleocene (late Selandian to early Thanetian)	Garra Formation	Egypt	A belosaepiid cuttlefish. The type species is Aegyptosaepia lugeri.	
Angulithes? palaeocenica	Sp. nov	Valid	Garvie	Late Paleocene	Seguin Formation	United States	A member of Hercoglossidae, possibly a species of Angulithes.	
Belemnitella badlandsensis	Sp. nov	Valid	Landman et al.	Late Cretaceous (Maastrichtian)	Fox Hills Formation	United States	A belemnite, a species of Belemnitella.	
Cameroceras turrisoides	Sp. nov	Valid	Kröger	Late Ordovician (late Katian)	Boda Limestone	Sweden	A member of Endocerida, a species of Cameroceras.	
Cimomia contraria	Sp. nov	Valid	Garvie	Late Paleocene	Seguin Formation	United States	A member of Hercoglossidae, a species of Cimomia.	
Clarkeiteuthis	Gen. et comb. nov	Valid	Fuchs, Donovan & Keupp	Early Jurassic (late Sinemurian to early Toarcian)		Germany; United Kingdom	A belemnoid; a new genus for "Phragmoteuthis" conocauda (Quenstedt, 1849) and "Phragmoteuthis" montefiorei (Buckman, 1880).	
Cylindroteuthis ornata	Sp. nov	Valid	Dzyuba	Jurassic-Cretaceous boundary (Volgian)		Russia	A cylindroteuthidid belemnite, a species of Cylindroteuthis.	
Cyrtorizoceras thorslundi	Sp. nov	Valid	Kröger	Late Ordovician (late Katian)	Boda Limestone	Sweden	A member of Oncocerida, a species of Cyrtorizoceras.	
Dawsonoceras stumburi	Sp. nov	Valid	Kröger	Late Ordovician (late Katian)	Boda Limestone	Sweden	A member of Orthocerida, a species of Dawsonoceras.	
Duvalia papretravinensis	Sp. nov	Valid	Janssen & Riegraf	Early Cretaceous (Berriasian)		Hungary	A belemnite.	
Eutrephoceras irritilasi	Sp. nov	Valid	Ifrim, Stinnesbeck & Ventura	Late Cretaceous (early Campanian)		Mexico	A species of Eutrephoceras.	
Isorthoceras angelini	Sp. nov	Valid	Kröger	Late Ordovician (late Katian)	Boda Limestone	Sweden	A member of Orthocerida, a species of Isorthoceras.	
Isorthoceras curvilineatum	Sp. nov	Valid	Kröger	Late Ordovician (late Katian)	Boda Limestone	Sweden	A member of Orthocerida, a species of Isorthoceras.	
Longibelus	Gen. et comb. nov	Valid	Fuchs et al.	Cretaceous (Aptian to Maastrichtian)		Chile; India; Japan; Mexico; Russia; South Africa; United States	A coleoid of uncertain phylogenetic placement. A new genus for "Naefia" matsumotoi Hirano et al. (1991); genus also contains "Naefia" kabanovi Doguzhaeva (1996).	
Nathorstoceras	Gen. et 2 sp. et comb. nov	Valid	Kröger	Late Ordovician (late Katian)		Sweden; Ukraine	A member of Orthocerida. Genus contains two new species: Nathorstoceras adnatum and N. kallholnense, as well as "Monomuchites" bacotense Balashov (1975).	
Normanoteuthis	Gen. et sp. nov	Valid	Breton, Strugnell & Donovan	Early Cretaceous (Albian)		France	A plesioteuthidid coleoid. The type species is Normanoteuthis inopinata.	
Novacaroceras	Nom. nov	Valid	Özdikmen	Late Cambrian		China	A member of Ellesmerocerida; a replacement name for Acaroceras Chen, Qi & Chen (1979).	
Pachyteuthis eximia	Sp. nov	Valid	Dzyuba	Jurassic-Cretaceous boundary (Volgian)		Russia	A cylindroteuthidid belemnite, a species of Pachyteuthis.	
Palaeodawsonocerina? nicolletoides	Sp. nov	Valid	Kröger	Late Ordovician (late Katian)	Boda Limestone	Sweden	A member of Orthocerida, possibly a species of Palaeodawsonocerina.	
Pleurorthoceras osmundsbergense	Sp. nov	Valid	Kröger	Late Ordovician (late Katian)	Boda Limestone	Sweden	A member of Orthocerida, a species of Pleurorthoceras.	
Probillingsites scandinavicum	Sp. nov	Valid	Kröger	Late Ordovician (late Katian)	Boda Limestone	Sweden	A member of Ascocerida, a species of Probillingsites.	
Redpathoceras bullatum	Sp. nov	Valid	Kröger	Late Ordovician (late Katian)	Boda Limestone	Sweden	A member of Ascocerida, a species of Redpathoceras.	
Redpathoceras depressum	Sp. nov	Valid	Kröger	Late Ordovician (late Katian)	Boda Limestone	Sweden	A member of Ascocerida, a species of Redpathoceras.	
Redpathoceras magnum	Sp. nov	Valid	Kröger	Late Ordovician (late Katian)	Boda Limestone	Sweden	A member of Ascocerida, a species of Redpathoceras.	
Rhaphibelus aciculiformis	Sp. nov	Valid	Zell, Beckmann & Stinnesbeck	Early Cretaceous (earliest Berriasian)		Mexico	A belemnite, a species of Rhaphibelus.	
Schuchertoceras fryi	Sp. nov	Valid	Kröger	Late Ordovician (late Katian)	Boda Limestone	Sweden	A member of Ascocerida, a species of Schuchertoceras.	
Siljanoceras	Gen. et sp. nov	Valid	Kröger	Late Ordovician (late Katian)	Boda Limestone	Sweden	A member of Uranoceratidae. The type species is Siljanoceras varians.	
Simobelus compactus	Sp. nov	Valid	Dzyuba	Jurassic-Cretaceous boundary (Volgian)		Russia	A cylindroteuthidid belemnite, a species of Simobelus.	
Striatocycloceras isbergi	Sp. nov	Valid	Kröger	Late Ordovician (late Katian)	Boda Limestone	Sweden	A member of Orthocerida, a species of Striatocycloceras.	
Warburgoceras	Gen. et comb. nov	Valid	Kröger	Late Ordovician (late Katian)	Boda Limestone	Sweden	A member of Uranoceratidae. A new genus for "Cyrtoceras" longitudinale Angelin in Angelin & Lindström (1880).	
Winkleriteuthis	Gen. et comb. nov	Valid	Fuchs, Heyng & Keupp	Late Jurassic (Tithonian)		Germany	A belemnoid, a new genus for "Acanthoteuthis" problematica Naef (1922).	

== Gastropods ==
Name	Novelty	Status	Authors	Age	Unit	Location	Notes	Images
‘Acteon’ problematicus	Sp. nov	Valid	Landau et al.	Miocene (Serravallian)	Tırtar Formation	Turkey	A member of Acteonoidea of uncertain phylogenetic placement, possibly a species of Acteon.	
Alaskodiscus	Nom. nov	Valid	Rohr, Frýda & Blodgett	Ordovician		United States	A bellerophontoidean; a replacement name for Alaskadiscus Rohr, Frýda & Blodgett (2003).	
Amalda bellovaciana	Sp. nov	Valid	Pacaud, Merle & Pons	Eocene (Ypresian)		France	An olive snail, a species of Amalda.	
Amalda beneharniana	Sp. nov	Valid	Pacaud, Merle & Pons	Eocene (Ypresian)		France	An olive snail, a species of Amalda.	
Amalda custodiensis	Sp. nov	Valid	Pacaud, Merle & Pons	Eocene (Ypresian)		France	An olive snail, a species of Amalda.	
Amalda pusagnensis	Sp. nov	Valid	Pacaud, Merle & Pons	Eocene (Priabonian)		France; Italy	An olive snail, a species of Amalda.	
Angulathilda	Gen. et comb. nov	Valid	Gründel & Nützel	Bathonian to Albian		Germany	A mathildid, a new genus for "Carinathilda" calloviensis (Gründel, 1997) and a few other species of Mesozoic mathildids.	
Anulifera chubutensis	Sp nov	Valid	Ferrari	Late Pliensbachian to early Toarcian	Mulanguiñeu Formation	Argentina	A protorculid, a species of Anulifera.	
Apiotoma (Lavarotoma) alva	Subgen. et sp. nov	Valid	Garvie	Late Paleocene	Seguin Formation	United States	A member of Cochlespirinae, a subgenus and species of Apiotoma.	
Architectonica bajaensis	Sp. nov	Valid	Perrilliat	Late Paleocene		Mexico	An architectonicid, a species of Architectonica.	
Architectonica bieleri	Sp. nov	Valid	Perrilliat	Late Paleocene		Mexico	An architectonicid, a species of Architectonica.	
Asmunda rebjongensis	Sp. nov	Valid	Robba	Miocene (late Langhian)	Tawun Formation	Indonesia	A turbonillid, a species of Asmunda.	
Aspella pacaudi	Sp nov	Valid	Goret, Ledon & Pons	Early Pliocene (Zanclean)			A muricid, a species of Aspella.	
Athleta (Volutospina) ledoni	Sp. nov	Valid	Pacaud & Pons	Eocene		France	A species of Athleta.	
Athleta (Volutospina) yvonnae	Sp. nov	Valid	Pacaud & Pons	Eocene		France	A species of Athleta.	
Atlanta funicularis	Sp. nov	Valid	Garvie	Eocene	Reklaw Formation	United States	A member of Atlantidae, a species of Atlanta.	
Austrocypraea goudeyana	Sp nov	Valid	Fehse	Miocene (Balcombian)	Fyansford Formation	Australia	A cypraeid, a species of Austrocypraea.	
Bacteridiella saurini	Sp. nov	Valid	Robba	Miocene (late Langhian)	Tawun Formation	Indonesia	A eulimelline turbonillid, a species of Bacteridiella.	
Bania obliquaecostata	Sp. nov	Valid	Neubauer et al.	Middle Miocene		Bosnia and Herzegovina	A hydrobiid, a species of Bania.	
Bartschella karasensis	Sp. nov	Valid	Robba	Miocene (late Langhian)	Tawun Formation	Indonesia	A turbonillid, a species of Bartschella.	
Bathrotomaria densireticulata	Sp. nov	Valid	Alberti et al.	Late Jurassic (Oxfordian)	Chari Formation	India	A member of the family Pleurotomariidae.	
Bathrotomaria depressa	Sp. nov	Valid	Alberti et al.	Late Jurassic (Oxfordian)	Gadhada Formation	India	A member of the family Pleurotomariidae.	
Bathrotomaria gangtaensis	Sp. nov	Valid	Alberti et al.	Late Jurassic (Oxfordian)	Gadhada Formation	India	A member of the family Pleurotomariidae.	
Bearizia	Gen. et comb. nov	Valid	Pacaud, Merle & Pons	Eocene (Priabonian)		France; Italy	An olive snail; a new genus for "Ancilla" priabonensis Boussac (1908).	
Bela pseudoappeliusi	Sp nov	Valid	Naldi, della Bella & Scarponi	Pliocene to Pleistocene		Italy	A mangeliid, a species of Bela.	
Bela seyithasanensis	Sp. nov	Valid	Landau et al.	Miocene (Serravallian)	Tırtar Formation	Turkey	A species of Bela.	
Besla tawunensis	Sp. nov	Valid	Robba	Miocene (late Langhian)	Tawun Formation	Indonesia	An odostomiid, a species of Besla.	
Besla unicincta	Sp. nov	Valid	Robba	Miocene (late Langhian)	Tawun Formation	Indonesia	An odostomiid, a species of Besla.	
Bleytonella	Gen. et sp. et comb. nov	Valid	Gründel & Kollmann	Early Cretaceous (Barremian to Aptian)		France; Switzerland	A member of Pickworthiidae. The type species is Bleytonella circumlata; genus also contains "Scalaria" brevis Pictet & Campiche (1862) and "Turbo" michaillensis Pictet & Campiche (1862).	
Bourguetia rarestriata	Sp. nov	Valid	Gründel & Mitta	Middle Jurassic (Callovian)	Unzha Basin	Russia	A member of Pseudomelaniidae, a species of Bourguetia.	
Brouzetdiscus	Gen. et comb. et sp. nov	Valid	Gründel & Kollmann	Early Cretaceous (Barremian)		France	A member of Discohelicidae. A new genus for "Discohelix" brouzetensis Cossmann (1916); genus might also contain new species Brouzetdiscus ? carinatus.	
Bulicingulina	Gen. et sp. nov	Valid	Robba	Miocene (late Langhian)	Tawun Formation	Indonesia	A cingulinine turbonillid. The type species is Bulicingulina rembangensis.	
Bulimoscilla	Gen. et 2 sp. nov	Valid	Robba	Miocene (late Langhian)	Tawun Formation	Indonesia	An odostomiid. The type species is Bulimoscilla stefanoi; genus also contains Bulimoscilla florianae.	
Calyptraphorus terrysmithae	Sp. nov	Valid	Perrilliat	Late Paleocene	Sepultura Formation	Mexico	A species of Calyptraphorus.	
Campanile zakhoense	Sp. nov	Valid	Harzhauser, Hoşgör & Pacaud	Thanetian	Kolosh Formation	Iraq	A campanilid, a species of Campanile.	
Cantharus seguinensis	Sp. nov	Valid	Garvie	Late Paleocene	Seguin Formation	United States	A member of Buccinidae, a species of Cantharus.	
Caricella? turboides	Sp. nov	Valid	Garvie	Eocene	Weches Formation	United States	A member of Volutidae, possibly a species of Caricella.	
Carinathilda? dieneri	Sp. nov	Valid	Schulbert & Nützel	Middle Jurassic (early Aalenian)	Opalinuston Formation	Germany	A member of Mathildidae, possibly a species of Carinathilda.	
Caveola ostium	Sp. nov	Valid	Garvie	Late Paleocene	Seguin Formation	United States	A member of Cancellariidae, a species of Caveola.	
Chrysallida majae	Sp. nov	Valid	Landau et al.	Miocene (Serravallian)	Tırtar Formation	Turkey	A species of Chrysallida.	
Chrysallida reticulata	Sp. nov	Valid	Robba	Miocene (late Langhian)	Tawun Formation	Indonesia	An odostomiid, a species of Chrysallida.	
Cimrmaniela	Gen. et 2 sp. nov	Valid	Frýda, Ferrová & Frýdová	Devonian		Czech Republic	A member of Palaeozygopleuridae. Genus contains two species: Cimrmaniela sveraki and Cimrmaniela smoljaki.	
Clathurella pouweri	Sp. nov	Valid	Landau et al.	Miocene (Serravallian)	Tırtar Formation	Turkey	A species of Clathurella.	
Clavatula labiolirata	Sp. nov	Valid	Landau et al.	Miocene (Serravallian)	Tırtar Formation	Turkey	A species of Clavatula.	
Clavatula seyithasanensis	Sp. nov	Valid	Landau et al.	Miocene (Serravallian)	Tırtar Formation	Turkey	A species of Clavatula.	
Clinuropsis tuberculata	Sp. nov	Valid	Garvie	Late Paleocene	Seguin Formation	United States	A member of Speightiidae, a species of Clinuropsis.	
Clinuropsis yanceyi	Sp. nov	Valid	Garvie	Late Paleocene	Seguin Formation	United States	A member of Speightiidae, a species of Clinuropsis.	
Cochlespira protomediterranea	Sp. nov	Valid	Landau et al.	Miocene (Serravallian)	Tırtar Formation	Turkey	A species of Cochlespira.	
Cochliolepis (Tylaxis) palaeocenica	Sp. nov	Valid	Garvie	Late Paleocene	Seguin Formation	United States	A member of Tornidae, a species of Cochliolepis.	
Colpomphalus spiralocostatus	Sp. nov	Valid	Gründel & Kollmann	Early Cretaceous (Barremian)		France	A member of Discohelicidae, a species of Colpomphalus	
Colwellia humerosa	Sp. nov	Valid	Garvie	Late Paleocene	Seguin Formation	United States	A member of Nassariidae, a species of Colwellia.	
Colwellia nodulina	Sp. nov	Valid	Garvie	Late Paleocene	Seguin Formation	United States	A member of Nassariidae, a species of Colwellia. The species includes new subspecies Colwellia nodulina meta.	
Conomitra karamanensis	Sp. nov	Valid	Landau et al.	Miocene (Serravallian)	Tırtar Formation	Turkey	A species of Conomitra.	
Conusella convexa	Sp. nov	Valid	Schulbert & Nützel	Middle Jurassic (early Aalenian)	Opalinuston Formation	Germany	A member of Tofanellidae, a species of Conusella.	
Coronia vallare	Sp. nov	Valid	Garvie	Late Paleocene	Seguin Formation	United States	A member of Turrinae, a species of Coronia.	
Cortana	Gen. et comb. nov	Valid	Salvador & de Simone	Middle Paleocene	Itaboraí Basin	Brazil	A bulimuline orthalicid; a new genus for "Bulimulus" carvalhoi Brito (1967).	Cortana carvalhoi
Cossmannina eggmaieri	Sp. nov	Valid	Schulbert & Nützel	Jurassic (late Toarcian/early Aalenian)	Opalinuston Formation	Germany	A member of Architectibranchia belonging to the family Tubiferidae, a species of Cossmannina.	
Costatomphalus	Gen. et sp. et comb. nov	Valid	Gründel & Kollmann	Early Cretaceous		France; Germany; Poland	A member of Liotiidae. The type species is Costatomphalus moosleitneri; genus also contains "Solarium" dentatocarinatum Wollemann (1900), "Straparolus" michaillensis Pictet & Campiche (1863) and "Discohelix" bandeli Schroeder (1995).	
Costosyrnola rebjongensis	Sp. nov	Valid	Robba	Miocene (late Langhian)	Tawun Formation	Indonesia	A syrnolid, a species of Costosyrnola.	
Crassauris	Gen. et sp. nov	Valid	Garvie	Late Paleocene	Seguin Formation	United States	A member of Mangeliinae. The type species is Crassauris seguinensis.	
Cyclostremiscus petiti	Sp. nov	Valid	Perrilliat	Late Paleocene	Sepultura Formation	Mexico	A species of Cyclostremiscus.	
Cyclothyrella	Gen. et comb. nov	Valid	Neubauer et al.	Middle Miocene		Bosnia and Herzegovina; Croatia	A belgrandiine hydrobiid, a new genus for "Litorinella" candidula Neumayr (1869); genus also contains "Prososthenia" tryoniopsis Brusina (1874) and "Belgrandia" klietmanni Neubauer in Neubauer et al. (2011).	
Cylichna (Cylichnopsis) bicarinata	Sp. nov	Valid	Garvie	Late Paleocene	Seguin Formation	United States	A member of Cylichnidae, a species of Cylichna.	
Cymenorytis dellabellai	Sp. nov	Valid	Sosso, Dell Angelo & Bonfitto	Pliocene (Zanclean–Piacenzian)		Italy; Spain	A member of Vanikoridae, a species of Cymenorytis.	
Cymenorytis landaui	Sp. nov	Valid	Sosso, Dell Angelo & Bonfitto	Pliocene (Zanclean)		Spain	A member of Vanikoridae, a species of Cymenorytis.	
Cyrtochetus (Cyrtochetus) augustulus	Sp. nov	Valid	Garvie	Eocene	Weches Formation	United States	A member of Columbellidae, a species of Cyrtochetus.	
Darwinices	Gen. et sp. nov	Valid	Griffin & Pastorino	Cenozoic		Argentina	A naticid. The type species is Darwinices claudiae.	
Dermomurex (Trialatella) kilikiensis	Sp. nov	Valid	Landau et al.	Miocene (Serravallian)	Tırtar Formation	Turkey	A species of Dermomurex.	
Ectinochilus (Cowlitzia) texanum stephensoni	Subsp. nov	Valid	Garvie	Eocene	Cook Mountain Formation	United States	A member of Strombidae, a subspecies of Ectinochilus texanum.	
Egila garudai	Sp. nov	Valid	Robba	Miocene (late Langhian)	Tawun Formation	Indonesia	An odostomiid, a species of Egila.	
Egilina karasensis	Sp. nov	Valid	Robba	Miocene (late Langhian)	Tawun Formation	Indonesia	An odostomiid, a species of Egilina.	
Elachisina gofasi	Sp. nov	Valid	Landau et al.	Miocene (Serravallian)	Tırtar Formation	Turkey	A member of Elachisinidae, a species of Elachisina.	
Elachisina rolani	Sp. nov	Valid	Landau et al.	Miocene (Serravallian)	Tırtar Formation	Turkey	A member of Elachisinidae, a species of Elachisina.	
Eoancilla hordea	Sp. nov	Valid	Garvie	Late Paleocene	Seguin Formation	United States	An olive snail, a species of Eoancilla.	
Eoatlanta ravni	Sp. nov	Valid	Schnetler	Paleocene (middle Danian)	Faxe Formation	Denmark	A possible member of Hipponicidae, a species of Eoatlanta.	
Eoborus fusiforme	Sp. nov	Valid	Salvador & de Simone	Middle Paleocene	Itaboraí Basin	Brazil	A megalobulimine strophocheilid, a species of Eoborus.	Eoborus fusiforme
Eopleurotoma molineuxae	Sp. nov	Valid	Garvie	Late Paleocene	Seguin Formation	United States	A member of Turrinae, a species of Eopleurotoma.	
Erentoezia	Gen. et comb. et sp. nov	Valid	Landau et al.	Oligocene and Miocene		France; Turkey	A member of Iravadiidae. The type species is "Pseudonoba" tarbelliana Lozouet (1998); genus also includes new species E. akpinarensis.	
Eucycloscala duocostata	Sp. nov	Valid	Gründel & Mitta	Middle Jurassic (Callovian)	Unzha Basin	Russia	A eucycloscalid eucycloid vetigastropod, a species of Eucycloscala.	
Eucyclus tramauensis	Sp. nov	Valid	Alberti et al.	Late Jurassic (Oxfordian)	Washtawa Formation	India	A member of the family Eucyclidae.	
Eulimella latemarginata	Sp. nov	Valid	Robba	Miocene (late Langhian)	Tawun Formation	Indonesia	A eulimelline turbonillid, a species of Eulimella.	
Eulimella lawsi	Sp. nov	Valid	Robba	Miocene (late Langhian)	Tawun Formation	Indonesia	A eulimelline turbonillid, a species of Eulimella.	
Eulimella rembangensis	Sp. nov	Valid	Robba	Miocene (late Langhian)	Tawun Formation	Indonesia	A eulimelline turbonillid, a species of Eulimella.	
Eunerinea mendozana	Sp. nov	Valid	Cataldo	Early Cretaceous	Agrio Formation	Argentina	A nerineoid gastropod, a species of Eunerinea.	
Europhos	Gen. et comb. nov	Valid	Landau et al.	Miocene and Pliocene		Austria; France; Italy; Portugal; Romania; Spain; Turkey	A member of Buccinidae. The type species is "Buccinum" polygonum Brocchi (1814); genus also includes "Voluta" cytharella Brongniart (1823), "Phos" hoernesi Semper (1861), "Phos" decussatus von Koenen (1872), "Phos" orditus Bellardi (1882) and "Phos" connectens Bellardi (1882).	
Exesilla langhiana	Sp. nov	Valid	Robba	Miocene (late Langhian)	Tawun Formation	Indonesia	A turbonillid, a species of Exesilla.	
Exesilla striata	Sp. nov	Valid	Robba	Miocene (late Langhian)	Tawun Formation	Indonesia	A turbonillid, a species of Exesilla.	
Extractrix dockeryi	Sp. nov	Valid	Harasewych & Petit	Eocene (Bartonian)	Gosport Sand Formation; McBean Formation	United States	A member of Cancellariidae, a species of Extractrix.	
"Faunus" dominicii	Sp. nov	Valid	Harzhauser, Hoşgör & Pacaud	Thanetian	Kolosh Formation	Iraq	A pachychilid; provisionally assigned to the genus Faunus, but probably actually belongs to a separate genus (to be described by Pacaud and Harzhauser).	
Favartia laletania	Sp nov	Valid	Goret, Ledon & Pons	Early Pliocene (Zanclean)			A muricid, a species of Favartia.	
Ferrissia urdunica	Sp. nov	Valid	Alhejoj & Bandel	Pleistocene	Al-Qarn Formation	Jordan	A species of Ferrissia.	
Franconicilda	Gen. et sp. nov	Valid	Schulbert & Nützel	Jurassic (late Toarcian/early Aalenian)	Opalinuston Formation	Germany	A member of Mathildidae. The type species is Franconicilda juliae.	
Fulgurofusus grande	Sp. nov	Valid	Garvie	Late Paleocene	Seguin Formation	United States	A member of Columbariinae, a species of Fulgurofusus.	
Gastrocopta itaboraiensis	Sp. nov	Valid	Salvador & de Simone	Middle Paleocene	Itaboraí Basin	Brazil	A gastrocoptid, a species of Gastrocopta.	
Gemmula taylori quadrata	Subsp. nov	Valid	Garvie	Eocene	Reklaw Formation	United States	A member of Turridae, a subspecies of Gemmula taylori.	
Genota pseudoelisae	Sp. nov	Valid	Landau et al.	Miocene (Serravallian)	Tırtar Formation	Turkey	A species of Genota.	
Gibborissoia angulosa	Sp. nov	Valid	Landau et al.	Miocene (Serravallian)	Tırtar Formation	Turkey	A member of Dialidae, a species of Gibborissoia.	
Hemisurcula terus	Sp. nov	Valid	Garvie	Eocene	Reklaw Formation	United States	A member of Clavatulidae, a species of Hemisurcula.	
Henrya wareni	Sp. nov	Valid	Landau et al.	Miocene (Serravallian)	Tırtar Formation	Turkey	A member of Murchisonellidae, a species of Henrya.	
Homalopoma laleensis	Sp. nov	Valid	Landau et al.	Miocene (Serravallian)	Tırtar Formation	Turkey	A species of Homalopoma.	
Hummelgauia	Gen. et sp. nov	Valid	Schulbert & Nützel	Middle Jurassic (early Aalenian)	Opalinuston Formation	Germany	A member of Murchisonellidae. The type species is Hummelgauia microstriata.	
Islamia jordanica	Sp. nov	Valid	Alhejoj & Bandel	Pleistocene	Al-Qarn Formation	Jordan	A species of Islamia.	
Janssenia	Gen. et comb. nov	Valid	Landau et al.	Miocene		Bulgaria; France; Greece; Hungary; Poland; Romania; Slovenia; Turkey	A member of Ergalataxinae. The type species is "Ricinula" calcarata Grateloup (1834); genus also includes "Cymia" pluriplicata Cossmann & Peyrot (1924) "Ricinula" echinulata Pusch (1837), "Cathymorula" bellardii Landau et al. (2007) and "Cymia" helenica Harzhauser & Kowalke (2001).	
Jurilda zapfi	Sp. nov	Valid	Schulbert, Nützel & Gründel in Schulbert & Nützel	Jurassic (late Toarcian/early Aalenian)	Opalinuston Formation	Germany	A member of Mathildidae, a species of Jurilda.	
Koloonella rebjongensis	Sp. nov	Valid	Robba	Miocene (late Langhian)	Tawun Formation	Indonesia	A eulimelline turbonillid, a species of Koloonella.	
Lacinia alveata serpens	Subsp. nov	Valid	Garvie	Eocene	Yegua Formation	United States	A member of Columbellidae, a subspecies of Lacinia alveata.	
Lacunaria carrenoae	Sp. nov	Valid	Perrilliat	Late Paleocene	Sepultura Formation	Mexico	A species of Lacunaria.	
Latirus (Levarlatirus)	Subgen. et comb. et 2 sp. nov	Valid	Garvie	Late Paleocene	Seguin Formation	United States	A member of Fasciolariidae, a subgenus of Latirus. The type species is "Fusus" ostraupis Harris (1895); the subgenus also includes new species Latirus (Levarlatirus) textilis and Latirus (Levarlatirus) undus.	
Lepsiella ukika	sp nov	Valid	Gordillo & Nielsen	Pleistocene		Chile	A haustrine muricid, a species of Lepsiella.	
Leptoconus hirmetzli	Sp. nov	Valid	Kovács & Vicián	Middle Miocene (early Badenian)		Hungary	A member of Conidae, a species of Leptoconus.	
Leucotina rebjongensis	Sp. nov	Valid	Robba	Miocene (late Langhian)	Tawun Formation	Indonesia	An amathinid, a species of Leucotina.	
Levifusus acutocarinata	Sp. nov	Valid	Garvie	Late Paleocene	Seguin Formation	United States	A member of Melongenidae, a species of Levifusus.	
Levifusus pagoda seguinensis	Subsp. nov	Valid	Garvie	Late Paleocene	Seguin Formation	United States	A member of Melongenidae, a subspecies of Levifusus pagoda.	
Levipyrgulina levisculpta	Sp. nov	Valid	Robba	Miocene (late Langhian)	Tawun Formation	Indonesia	An odostomiid, a species of Levipyrgulina.	
Liamorpha minuta	Sp. nov	Valid	Robba	Miocene (late Langhian)	Tawun Formation	Indonesia	An odostomiid, a species of Liamorpha.	
Liamorpha rembangensis	Sp. nov	Valid	Robba	Miocene (late Langhian)	Tawun Formation	Indonesia	An odostomiid, a species of Liamorpha.	
Lindapterys cervantesorum	Sp nov	Valid	Goret, Ledon & Pons	Early Pliocene (Zanclean)			A muricid, a species of Lindapterys.	
Linopyrga gradata	Sp. nov	Valid	Robba	Miocene (late Langhian)	Tawun Formation	Indonesia	An odostomiid, a species of Linopyrga.	
Linopyrga marcoi	Sp. nov	Valid	Robba	Miocene (late Langhian)	Tawun Formation	Indonesia	An odostomiid, a species of Linopyrga.	
Longchaeus schepmani	Sp. nov	Valid	Robba	Miocene (late Langhian)	Tawun Formation	Indonesia	A pyramidellid, a species of Longchaeus.	
Loxotrema texana	Sp. nov	Valid	Garvie	Late Paleocene	Seguin Formation	United States	A member of Pachychilidae, a species of Loxotrema.	
Macromargarya	Gen. et sp. nov	Valid	Ying, Fürsich & Schneider	Early Oligocene	Gongkang Formation	China	A viviparid. The type species is Macromargarya aliena.	
Margarya nanningensis	Sp. nov	Valid	Ying, Fürsich & Schneider	Early Oligocene	Gongkang Formation	China	A viviparid, a species of Margarya.	
Megastomia gradata	Sp. nov	Valid	Robba	Miocene (late Langhian)	Tawun Formation	Indonesia	An odostomiid, a species of Megastomia.	
Megastomia tawunensis	Sp. nov	Valid	Robba	Miocene (late Langhian)	Tawun Formation	Indonesia	An odostomiid, a species of Megastomia.	
Melanoides abuhabili	Sp. nov	Valid	Alhejoj & Bandel	Pleistocene	Al-Qarn Formation	Jordan	A species of Melanoides.	
Melanopsis corici	Sp. nov	Valid	Neubauer et al.	Middle Miocene		Bosnia and Herzegovina	A melanopsid, a species of Melanopsis.	
Melanopsis medinae	Nom. nov	Valid	Neubauer et al.	Middle Miocene		Bosnia and Herzegovina	A melanopsid, a species of Melanopsis; a replacement name for Melanopsis bittneri (Neumayr, 1880).	
Melanopsis salamei	Sp. nov	Valid	Alhejoj & Bandel	Pleistocene	Al-Qarn Formation	Jordan	A species of Melanopsis.	
Melongena jaapi	Sp. nov	Valid	Landau et al.	Miocene (Serravallian)	Tırtar Formation	Turkey	A species of Melongena.	
Menesthella bicarinata	Sp. nov	Valid	Robba	Miocene (late Langhian)	Tawun Formation	Indonesia	An odostomiid, a species of Menesthella.	
Menesthella javanensis	Sp. nov	Valid	Robba	Miocene (late Langhian)	Tawun Formation	Indonesia	An odostomiid, a species of Menesthella.	
Menesthella matteoi	Sp. nov	Valid	Robba	Miocene (late Langhian)	Tawun Formation	Indonesia	An odostomiid, a species of Menesthella.	
Metula reticulata	Sp. nov	Valid	Garvie	Late Paleocene	Seguin Formation	United States	A species of Metula.	
Micrancilla alibamasiana	Sp. nov	Valid	Pacaud, Merle & Pons	Eocene (Bartonian)		United States	An olive snail, a species of Micrancilla.	
Micrancilla guanensis	Sp. nov	Valid	Pacaud, Merle & Pons	Eocene (Ypresian)		France	An olive snail, a species of Micrancilla.	
Micrancilla oesiensis	Sp. nov	Valid	Pacaud, Merle & Pons	Paleogene (Thanetian to Ypresian)		France	An olive snail, a species of Micrancilla.	
Micratys fragilissimus	Sp. nov	Valid	Landau et al.	Miocene (Serravallian)	Tırtar Formation	Turkey	A member of Haminoeidae, a species of Micratys.	
Microdrillia infans reklawensis	Subsp. nov	Valid	Garvie	Eocene	Reklaw Formation	United States	A member of Clavatulidae, a subspecies of Microdrillia infans.	
Mistelgauia	Gen. et sp. nov	Valid	Schulbert & Nützel	Jurassic (Pliensbachian to late Toarcian/early Aalenian)		Germany	A member of Eucyclidae. The type species is Mistelgauia monarii; genus also includes "Tylotrochus" raresculptatus Gründel (1999).	
Mnestia ovata	Sp. nov	Valid	Garvie	Late Paleocene	Seguin Formation	United States	A member of Cylichnidae, a species of Mnestia.	
Morula (Habromorula) combauti	Sp nov	Valid	Goret & Pons	Miocene		France	A muricid, a species of Morula.	
Nassarius barbarossai	Sp. nov	Valid	Landau et al.	Miocene (Serravallian)	Tırtar Formation	Turkey	A species of Nassarius.	
Nassarius erentoezae	Sp. nov	Valid	Landau et al.	Miocene (Serravallian)	Tırtar Formation	Turkey	A species of Nassarius.	
Nassarius erunalae	Sp. nov	Valid	Landau et al.	Miocene (Serravallian)	Tırtar Formation	Turkey	A species of Nassarius.	
Nassarius gilii	Sp. nov	Valid	Landau et al.	Miocene (Serravallian)	Tırtar Formation	Turkey	A species of Nassarius.	
Nassarius larandicus	Sp. nov	Valid	Landau et al.	Miocene (Serravallian)	Tırtar Formation	Turkey	A species of Nassarius.	
Nassarius pascaleae	Sp. nov	Valid	Landau et al.	Miocene (Serravallian)	Tırtar Formation	Turkey	A species of Nassarius.	
Nassarius pseudoserrulus	Sp. nov	Valid	Landau et al.	Miocene (Serravallian)	Tırtar Formation	Turkey	A species of Nassarius.	
Natica (Carinacca) seguinensis	Sp. nov	Valid	Garvie	Late Paleocene	Seguin Formation	United States	A species of Natica.	
Nematurella vrabaci	Sp. nov	Valid	Neubauer et al.	Middle Miocene		Bosnia and Herzegovina	A hydrobiine hydrobiid, a species of Nematurella.	
Neritopsis indica	Sp. nov	Valid	Alberti et al.	Late Jurassic (Oxfordian)	Chari Formation	India	A species of Neritopsis.	
Nisipyrgiscus	Gen. et 2 sp. nov	Valid	Robba	Miocene (late Langhian)	Tawun Formation	Indonesia	A turbonillid. The type species is Nisipyrgiscus javanensis; genus also contains Nisipyrgiscus filicinctus.	
Nisiturris columellaris	Sp. nov	Valid	Robba	Miocene (late Langhian)	Tawun Formation	Indonesia	A turbonillid, a species of Nisiturris.	
Nisiturris karasensis	Sp. nov	Valid	Robba	Miocene (late Langhian)	Tawun Formation	Indonesia	A turbonillid, a species of Nisiturris.	
Nisiturris obliquecostata	Sp. nov	Valid	Robba	Miocene (late Langhian)	Tawun Formation	Indonesia	A turbonillid, a species of Nisiturris.	
Nisiturris piccolii	Sp. nov	Valid	Robba	Miocene (late Langhian)	Tawun Formation	Indonesia	A turbonillid, a species of Nisiturris.	
Nisiturris rembangensis	Sp. nov	Valid	Robba	Miocene (late Langhian)	Tawun Formation	Indonesia	A turbonillid, a species of Nisiturris.	
Nisiturris supramarginata	Sp. nov	Valid	Robba	Miocene (late Langhian)	Tawun Formation	Indonesia	A turbonillid, a species of Nisiturris.	
Nisosyrnola	Gen. et comb. nov	Valid	Landau et al.	Miocene		Romania; Turkey	A member of Syrnolinae. The type species is "Niso" concava Boettger (1907).	
Nummogaultina tricarinata	Sp. nov	Valid	Gründel & Kollmann	Early Cretaceous (Barremian)		France	An astraeine turbinid, a species of Nummogaultina	
Ocinebrina perparva	Sp. nov	Valid	Landau et al.	Miocene (Serravallian)	Tırtar Formation	Turkey	A species of Ocinebrina.	
Odostomia (Doliella) deprimere	Sp. nov	Valid	Garvie	Late Paleocene	Seguin Formation	United States	A member of Pyramidellidae, a species of Odostomia.	
Olianatrivia	Gen. et sp. nov	Valid	Dolin, Biosca-Munts & Parcerisa	Eocene (Bartonian)		Spain	A member of Pediculariinae. The type species is O. riberai.	
Oniscidia claibornensis	Sp. nov	Valid	Garvie	Eocene	Cook Mountain Formation	United States	A member of Harpidae, a species of Oniscidia.	
Pachychilus fulvus	Sp. nov	Valid	Garvie	Eocene	Weches Formation	United States	A member of Pachychilidae, a species of Pachychilus.	
Pachymelania islamogluae	Sp. nov	Valid	Harzhauser, Hoşgör & Pacaud	Thanetian	Kolosh Formation	Iraq	A thiarid, a species of Pachymelania.	
Palaeorhaphis palaeocenica	Sp. nov	Valid	Garvie	Late Paleocene	Seguin Formation	United States	A member of Fasciolariidae, a species of Palaeorhaphis.	
Palaeozygopleura lukesi	Sp. nov	Valid	Frýda, Ferrová & Frýdová	Devonian		Czech Republic	A member of Palaeozygopleuridae, a species of Palaeozygopleura.	
Paraseraphs texanopsis	Sp. nov	Valid	Garvie	Eocene	Weches Formation	United States	A member of Seraphsidae, a species of Paraseraphs.	
Parodostomia bifuniculata	Sp. nov	Valid	Robba	Miocene (late Langhian)	Tawun Formation	Indonesia	An odostomiid, a species of Parodostomia.	
Parodostomia sartonoi	Sp. nov	Valid	Robba	Miocene (late Langhian)	Tawun Formation	Indonesia	An odostomiid, a species of Parodostomia.	
Parodostomia teresae	Sp. nov	Valid	Robba	Miocene (late Langhian)	Tawun Formation	Indonesia	An odostomiid, a species of Parodostomia.	
Parvulactaeon imprimum	Sp. nov	Valid	Schulbert, Nützel & Gründel in Schulbert & Nützel	Jurassic (late Toarcian and early Aalenian)	Opalinuston Formation	Germany	A member of Bullinidae, a species of Parvulactaeon.	
Parvulactaeon inclinatum	Sp. nov	Valid	Schulbert, Nützel & Gründel in Schulbert & Nützel	Middle Jurassic (early Aalenian)	Opalinuston Formation	Germany	A member of Bullinidae, a species of Parvulactaeon.	
Perispatula	Gen. et sp. nov	Disputed	Checchi, Zamberlan & Alberti	Eocene		Italy	A member of Pediculariinae. The type species is P. costagranosa. Dolin & Aguerre (2018) considered Perispatula to be a synonym of Olianatrivia, while Celzard et al. (2026) considered the two genera to be synonymous but determined P. costagranosa to be a distinct species within the genus Olianatrivia, O. costagranosa.	
Perrona robustocarinifera	Sp. nov	Valid	Landau et al.	Miocene (Serravallian)	Tırtar Formation	Turkey	A species of Perrona.	
Persististrombus pannonicus	Sp nov	Valid	Harzhauser & Kronenberg	Middle Miocene	Tauchen Formation	Austria	A strombid, a species of Persististrombus.	
Phalium (Echinophoria) cingulae	Sp. nov	Valid	Garvie	Eocene	Reklaw Formation	United States	A species of Phalium.	
Phalium (Semicassis) marcusi	Sp. nov	Valid	Garvie	Eocene	Weches Formation	United States	A species of Phalium.	
Philine seyithasanensis	Sp. nov	Valid	Landau et al.	Miocene (Serravallian)	Tırtar Formation	Turkey	A species of Philine.	
Platyoptera cherokeensis	Sp. nov	Valid	Garvie	Eocene	Weches/Reklaw? Formation	United States	A member of Strombidae, a species of Platyoptera.	
Pleurotomoides isabelae	Sp. nov	Valid	Landau et al.	Miocene (Serravallian)	Tırtar Formation	Turkey	A member of Clathurellidae, a species of Pleurotomoides.	
Polinices mina	Sp. nov	Valid	Griffin & Pastorino	Cenozoic		Argentina	A naticid, a species of Polinices.	
Polinices (Euspira) perspecta texana	Subsp. nov	Valid	Garvie	Late Paleocene	Seguin Formation	United States	A subspecies of Polinices perspecta.	
Polinices (Polinices) saulae	Sp. nov	Valid	Perrilliat	Late Paleocene	Sepultura Formation	Mexico	A species of Polinices.	
Polygona vermeiji	Sp. nov	Junior homonym	Landau et al.	Miocene (Serravallian)	Tırtar Formation	Turkey	A species of Polygona. The specific name is preoccupied by Polygona vermeiji (Petuch, 1986); Landau et al. (2014) subsequently coined a replacement name Polygona geeratvermeiji.	
Praesurcula	Gen. et sp. nov	Valid	Garvie	Late Paleocene	Seguin Formation	United States	A member of Cochlespirinae. The type species is Praesurcula palaeocenica.	
Priscoficus vermeiji	Sp. nov	Valid	Perrilliat	Late Paleocene	Sepultura Formation	Mexico	A species of Priscoficus.	
Prososthenia diaphoros	Sp. nov	Valid	Neubauer et al.	Middle Miocene		Bosnia and Herzegovina	A pyrguline hydrobiid, a species of Prososthenia.	
Prososthenia undocostata	Sp. nov	Valid	Neubauer et al.	Middle Miocene		Bosnia and Herzegovina	A pyrguline hydrobiid, a species of Prososthenia.	
Pseudoaluco mesopotamicus	Sp. nov	Valid	Harzhauser, Hoşgör & Pacaud	Thanetian	Kolosh Formation	Iraq	A cerithiid, a species of Pseudoaluco.	
Pseudodianella	Gen. et comb. nov	Valid	Neubauer et al.	Middle Miocene to Pliocene		Bosnia and Herzegovina; Croatia; Greece; Republic of Macedonia	A pyrguline hydrobiid, a new genus for "Pyrgula" haueri Neumayr (1869); genus also contains "Diana" amplior Pavlović (1903), "Diana" petkovici Pavlović (1903), "Pyrgula" tricarinata Fuchs (1877) and "Pyrgula" brusinai Tournouër (1875).	
Pseudoliotina? parva	Sp. nov	Valid	Gründel & Kollmann	Early Cretaceous (Barremian)		France	A member of Liotiidae, possibly a species of Pseudoliotina	
Pseudoliva globosa	Sp. nov	Valid	Garvie	Late Paleocene	Seguin Formation	United States	A member of Pseudolividae, a species of Pseudoliva.	
Pseudomelania feruglioi	Sp nov	Valid	Ferrari	Late Pliensbachian to early Toarcian	Mulanguiñeu Formation	Argentina	A pseudomelaniid, a species of Pseudomelania.	
Pugilina paraguanensis	Sp. nov	Valid	Landau & Vermeij	Miocene (Burdigalian)	Cantaure Formation	Venezuela	A species of Pugilina.	
Puposyrnola karasensis	Sp. nov	Valid	Robba	Miocene (late Langhian)	Tawun Formation	Indonesia	A syrnolid, a species of Puposyrnola.	
Pusia baluki	Sp. nov	Valid	Landau et al.	Miocene (Serravallian)	Tırtar Formation	Turkey	A species of Pusia.	
Pyramidella (Syrnola) bilineata	Sp. nov	Valid	Garvie	Late Paleocene	Seguin Formation	United States	A member of Pyramidellidae, a species of Pyramidella.	
Pyrazopsis hexagonpyramidalis	Sp. nov	Valid	Harzhauser, Hoşgör & Pacaud	Thanetian	Kolosh Formation	Iraq	A batillariid, a species of Pyrazopsis.	
Pyrgiscus apiciglobosus	Sp. nov	Valid	Robba	Miocene (late Langhian)	Tawun Formation	Indonesia	A turbonillid, a species of Pyrgiscus.	
Pyrgiscus dentatus	Sp. nov	Valid	Robba	Miocene (late Langhian)	Tawun Formation	Indonesia	A turbonillid, a species of Pyrgiscus.	
Pyrgiscus martini	Nom. nov	Valid	Robba	Early Miocene		Indonesia	A turbonillid; a replacement name for "Turbonilla" scalaris Martin (1884).	
Pyrgulina micalii	Sp. nov	Valid	Robba	Miocene (late Langhian)	Tawun Formation	Indonesia	An odostomiid, a species of Pyrgulina.	
Pyrgulina wesselinghi	Sp. nov	Valid	Robba	Miocene (late Langhian)	Tawun Formation	Indonesia	An odostomiid, a species of Pyrgulina.	
Raphitoma spinosissima	Sp. nov	Valid	Landau et al.	Miocene (Serravallian)	Tırtar Formation	Turkey	A species of Raphitoma.	
Raphitoma vandervoorti	Sp. nov	Valid	Landau et al.	Miocene (Serravallian)	Tırtar Formation	Turkey	A species of Raphitoma.	
Retusa (Cylichnina) bastropensis	Sp. nov	Valid	Garvie	Late Paleocene	Seguin Formation	United States	A member of Retusidae, a species of Retusa.	
Rhombostoma? daani	Sp. nov	Valid	Landau et al.	Miocene (Serravallian)	Tırtar Formation	Turkey	A member of Iravadiidae, possibly a species of Rhombostoma.	
Rhombostoma? meesi	Sp. nov	Valid	Landau et al.	Miocene (Serravallian)	Tırtar Formation	Turkey	A member of Iravadiidae, possibly a species of Rhombostoma.	
Roamerella	Nom. nov	Valid	Donovan & van den Hoek Ostende	Late Cretaceous (Turonian to Campanian)		Germany	A turritellid gastropod; a replacement name for Roemerella Akopyan in Akopyan et al. (1990). The type species is "Turritella" nerinea Roemer (1841).	
Scalptia? problematica	Sp. nov	Valid	Landau et al.	Miocene (Serravallian)	Tırtar Formation	Turkey	Possibly a species of Scalptia.	
Scaphander (Mirascapha) smithvillensis	Sp. nov	Valid	Garvie	Eocene	Weches Formation	United States	A species of Scaphander.	
Sinuarbullina mistelgauensis	Sp. nov	Valid	Schulbert, Nützel & Gründel in Schulbert & Nützel	Jurassic (late Toarcian/early Aalenian)	Opalinuston Formation	Germany	A member of Architectibranchia belonging to the family Tubiferidae, a species of Sinuarbullina.	
Sohliina	Nom. nov	Valid	Özdikmen	Cretaceous		United States	A member of the family Muricidae; a replacement name for Lowenstamia Sohl (1964).	
Solariella? bajaensis	Sp. nov	Valid	Perrilliat	Late Paleocene	Sepultura Formation	Mexico	Possibly a species of Solariella.	
Solariorbis punctatocarinatus	Sp. nov	Valid	Landau et al.	Miocene (Serravallian)	Tırtar Formation	Turkey	A species of Solariorbis.	
Solariorbis velarum	Sp. nov	Valid	Garvie	Late Paleocene	Seguin Formation	United States	A member of Turbinidae, a species of Solariorbis.	
Spirancilla bearizensis	Sp. nov	Valid	Pacaud, Merle & Pons	Eocene (Priabonian)		France	An olive snail, a species of Spirancilla.	
Spirancilla bechevillersensis	Sp. nov	Valid	Pacaud, Merle & Pons	Paleocene (Thanetian)		France	An olive snail, a species of Spirancilla.	
Spirancilla vasconiana	Sp. nov	Valid	Pacaud, Merle & Pons	Eocene (Priabonian)		France	An olive snail, a species of Spirancilla.	
Strepsidura cancellata	Sp. nov	Valid	Garvie	Late Paleocene	Seguin Formation	United States	A member of Melongenidae, a species of Strepsidura.	
Striactaeonina richterorum	Sp. nov	Valid	Schulbert, Nützel & Gründel in Schulbert & Nützel	Middle Jurassic (early Aalenian)	Opalinuston Formation	Germany	A member of Architectibranchia belonging to the family Tubiferidae, a species of Striactaeonina.	
Striactaeonina waltschewi	Sp. nov	Valid	Schulbert, Nützel & Gründel in Schulbert & Nützel	Early Jurassic (late Toarcian)	Opalinuston Formation	Germany	A member of Architectibranchia belonging to the family Tubiferidae, a species of Striactaeonina.	
Striatoconulus stupachenkoi	Sp. nov	Valid	Gründel & Mitta	Middle Jurassic (Callovian)	Unzha Basin	Russia	A homalopomatine false top snail, a species of Striatoconulus.	
Strioturbonilla rebjongensis	Sp. nov	Valid	Robba	Miocene (late Langhian)	Tawun Formation	Indonesia	An odostomiid, a species of Strioturbonilla.	
Strobeus batteni	Sp nov	Valid	Kaim et al.	Early Triassic (early Smithian)	Ceratite Sandstone	Pakistan	A soleniscid gastropod, a species of Strobeus.	
Strobeus pakistanensis	Sp nov	Valid	Kaim et al.	Early Triassic (possibly early Smithian)	Upper Ceratite Beds, Bellerophon Bed	Pakistan	A soleniscid gastropod, a species of Strobeus.	
Sulcospira nagiensis	Sp. nov	Valid	Matsuoka & Taguchi	Miocene	Yoshino Formation	Japan	A pachychilid, a species of Sulcospira.	
Surculites venustus	Sp. nov	Valid	Garvie	Eocene	Cook Mountain Formation	United States	A member of Fasciolariidae, a species of Surculites.	
Syrnola imminens	Sp. nov	Valid	Robba	Miocene (late Langhian)	Tawun Formation	Indonesia	A syrnolid, a species of Syrnola.	
Syrnola turbinolonga	Sp. nov	Valid	Robba	Miocene (late Langhian)	Tawun Formation	Indonesia	A syrnolid, a species of Syrnola.	
Teinostoma (Idioraphie) seguinensis	Sp. nov	Valid	Garvie	Late Paleocene	Seguin Formation	United States	A member of Tornidae, a species of Teinostoma.	
Teinostoma squiresi	Sp. nov	Valid	Perrilliat	Late Paleocene	Sepultura Formation	Mexico	A species of Teinostoma.	
Tejonia arroyoensis	Sp. nov	Valid	Griffin & Pastorino	Cenozoic		Argentina	An ampullinid, a species of Tejonia.	
Texaficus	Gen. et sp. nov	Valid	Garvie	Late Paleocene	Seguin Formation	United States	A member of Melongenidae. The type species is Texaficus obesus.	
Texmelanatria brevis	Sp. nov	Valid	Garvie	Late Paleocene	Seguin Formation	United States	A member of Melanopsidae, a species of Texmelanatria.	
Texmelanatria contracta	Sp. nov	Valid	Garvie	Late Paleocene	Seguin Formation	United States	A member of Melanopsidae, a species of Texmelanatria.	
Thericium ataturki	Sp. nov	Valid	Landau et al.	Miocene (Serravallian)	Tırtar Formation	Turkey	A member of Cerithiidae, a species of Thericium.	
Tiaracerithium eceae	Sp. nov	Valid	Landau et al.	Miocene (Serravallian)	Tırtar Formation	Turkey	A member of Batillariidae, a species of Tiaracerithium.	
Tibiella watupuruensis	Sp. nov	Valid	Janssen in Janssen, Renema & Wesselingh	Eocene (Bartonian)	Nanggulan Formation	Indonesia	A member of Cavolinioidea belonging to the family Creseidae, a species of Tibiella.	
Tornus karamanensis	Sp. nov	Valid	Landau et al.	Miocene (Serravallian)	Tırtar Formation	Turkey	A species of Tornus.	
Triloba magurkai	Sp. nov	Valid	Stworzewicz in Stworzewicz & Prisyazhnyuk & Górka	Middle Miocene		Poland	A member of Clausiliidae. Originally described as a species of Triloba, but subsequently transferred to the genus Protriloba.	
Tritiaria? seguinensis	Sp. nov	Valid	Garvie	Late Paleocene	Seguin Formation	United States	A member of Nassariidae, possibly a species of Tritiaria.	
Tritonoharpa alanbeui	Sp. nov	Valid	Landau et al.	Miocene (Serravallian)	Tırtar Formation	Turkey	A species of Tritonoharpa.	
Tropisurcula? (Eodrillia) cingula	Sp. nov	Valid	Garvie	Late Paleocene	Seguin Formation	United States	A member of Cochlespirinae, possibly a species of Tropisurcula.	
Turbolidium	Gen. et comb. nov	Valid	Robba	Pleistocene to recent		Indonesia	A turbonillid. A new genus for the Pleistocene species "Turbonilla" schroederi Wissema (1947) from Indonesia; genus also contains living species "Turbonilla" unilirata Bush (1899) from the Caribbean, "Tragula" unilirata Saurin (1959) from Vietnam, "Turbonilla" franciscoi Peñas & Rolán (1997) from West Africa and "Turbonilla" qenenoji Peñas & Rolán (2010) from the Solomon Islands.	
Turbonilla karasensis	Sp. nov	Valid	Robba	Miocene (late Langhian)	Tawun Formation	Indonesia	A turbonillid, a species of Turbonilla.	
Turbonilla (Chemnitzia) obliqueata	Sp. nov	Valid	Garvie	Late Paleocene	Seguin Formation	United States	A species of Turbonilla.	
Turbonilla (Chemnitzia) reklawensis	Sp. nov	Valid	Garvie	Eocene	Reklaw Formation	United States	A species of Turbonilla.	
Turbonilla tawunensis	Sp. nov	Valid	Robba	Miocene (late Langhian)	Tawun Formation	Indonesia	A turbonillid, a species of Turbonilla.	
Turritella mortoni crassa	Subsp. nov	Valid	Garvie	Late Paleocene	Seguin Formation	United States	A member of Turritellidae, a subspecies of Turritella mortoni.	
Tylotrochus extremus	Sp. nov	Valid	Garvie	Late Paleocene	Seguin Formation	United States	A member of Calliostomatidae, a species of Tylotrochus.	
Urticicola perchtae	Sp. nov	Valid	Salvador	Miocene		Germany	A member of Hygromiidae, a species of Urticicola.	
Valvata beysehirensis	Sp. nov	Valid	Glöer & Girod	Pleistocene		Turkey	A new freshwater snail.	
Varicipotamides	Nom. nov	Valid	Pacaud & Harzhauser in Harzhauser, Hoşgör & Pacaud	Bartonian	Paris Basin	France	A replacement name for Exechestoma Cossmann (1889; preoccupied).	
Varioconus erunalerentoezae	Sp. nov	Valid	Landau et al.	Miocene (Serravallian)	Tırtar Formation	Turkey	A species of Varioconus.	
Volutocorbis olssoni gracilis	Subsp. nov	Valid	Garvie	Late Paleocene	Seguin Formation	United States	A member of Volutidae, a subspecies of Volutocorbis olssoni gracilis.	
Volutostrombus	Gen. et sp. nov	Valid	Garvie	Eocene	Cook Mountain Formation	United States	A member of Strombidae. The type species is Volutostrombus eocenica.	
Waikura lawsi	Sp. nov	Valid	Robba	Miocene (late Langhian)	Tawun Formation	Indonesia	An odostomiid, a species of Waikura.	
Xenophora spiralis	Sp. nov	Valid	Garvie	Eocene	Reklaw Formation	United States	A species of Xenophora.	

== Other molluscs ==
Name	Novelty	Status	Authors	Age	Unit	Location	Notes	Images
Adrana seguinensis	Sp. nov	Valid	Garvie	Late Paleocene	Seguin Formation	United States	A bivalve belonging to the family Yoldiidae, a species of Adrana.	
Amanocina	Gen. et comb. et 2 sp. nov	Valid	Kiel	Early Cretaceous (Berriasian) to Oligocene		Colombia; Greenland; Japan; New Zealand	A bivalve belonging to the family Lucinidae. The type species is "Thracia" yezoensis Kanie & Kuramochi (1996); genus also includes "Cryptolucina" kuhnpassetensis Kelly (2000), as well as new species A. raukumara and A. colombiana.	
Arcopagia (Arcopagia) solomonis	Sp. nov	Valid	Garvie	Late Paleocene	Seguin Formation	United States	A bivalve belonging to the family Tellinidae, a species of Arcopagia.	
Arcopagia (Johnsonella) seguinensis	Sp. nov	Valid	Garvie	Late Paleocene	Seguin Formation	United States	A bivalve belonging to the family Tellinidae, a species of Arcopagia.	
Barbatia (Cucullaearca) kickapooensis	Sp. nov	Valid	Garvie	Eocene	Weches Formation	United States	An ark clam, a species of Barbatia.	
Bathymodiolus (sensu lato) satsopensis	Sp. nov	Valid	Kiel & Amano	Late Oligocene	Lincoln Creek Formation	United States	A bathymodiolin mussel, a species of Bathymodiolus (sensu lato).	
Bornia solomonis	Sp. nov	Valid	Garvie	Late Paleocene	Seguin Formation	United States	A bivalve belonging to the family Lasaeidae, a species of Bornia.	
Calorhadia diminutia	Sp. nov	Valid	Garvie	Late Paleocene	Seguin Formation	United States	A bivalve belonging to the family Nuculanidae, a species of Calorhadia.	
Caprinuloidea romeri	Sp. nov	Valid	Mitchell	Early Cretaceous	Edwards Limestone	United States	A caprinuloideid caprinoid rudist.	
Carinopelta	Nom. nov	Valid	Parkhaev	Cambrian		Australia; Russia	A member of Helcionelliformes; a replacement name for Trilobella Vassiljeva (1990) and Igarkiella Vassiljeva (1998) (both preoccupied).	
Cochlodesma unda	Sp. nov	Valid	Garvie	Eocene	Cook Mountain Formation	United States	A bivalve belonging to the family Periplomatidae, a species of Cochlodesma.	
Connexochiton roccai	Sp. nov	Valid	Dell'Angelo et al.	Pliocene (Zanclean)		Italy	A chiton, a species of Connexochiton.	
Cubatea awanuiensis	Sp. nov	Valid	Kiel	Cretaceous (Albian to Cenomanian)		New Zealand	A bivalve belonging to the family Lucinidae.	
Crittendenia langsonensis	Sp. nov	Valid	Komatsu et al.	Early Triassic (Olenekian)	Bac Thuy Formation	Vietnam	A bivalve, a species of Crittendenia.	
Curtocaprina	Gen. et sp. nov	Valid	Mitchell	Early Cretaceous (Albian)	Edwards Formation	United States	An ichthyosarcolitid caprinoid rudist. The type species is Curtocaprina clabaughikinsorum.	
Cuspidaria textorama	Sp. nov	Valid	Garvie	Eocene	Reklaw Formation	United States	A bivalve belonging to the family Cuspidariidae, a species of Cuspidaria.	
Cyclocardia kieli	Sp. nov	Valid	Nielsen	Pliocene		Chile	A bivalve, a species of Cyclocardia.	
Elliptiolucina washingtonia	Sp. nov	Valid	Kiel	Late Oligocene	Lincoln Creek Formation	United States	A bivalve belonging to the family Lucinidae.	
Elongatolucina	Gen. et comb. et sp. nov	Valid	Gill & Little	Eocene to Miocene	Humptulips Formation; Pozon Formation	Colombia; United States; Venezuela	A bivalve belonging to the family Lucinidae. The type species is "Cryptolucina" elassodyseides Saul, Squires & Goedert (1996); genus also includes new species E. peckmanni Kiel (2013).	
Fimbria lohani	Nom. nov	Valid	Pacaud	Eocene (Lutetian)		France	A fimbriid bivalve, a species of Fimbria; a replacement name for Fimbria subpectunculus (d’Orbigny, 1850).	
Goshoraia maedai	Sp. nov	Valid	Komatsu	Late Cretaceous (Cenomanian)		Japan	A venerid bivalve, a species of Goshoraia.	
Hoarechiton	Gen. et sp. nov	Valid	Sirenko	Late Jurassic (middle Volgian)		Russia	A leptochitonid chiton. The type species is Hoarechiton guzhovi.	
Huasteca	Gen. et comb. nov	Valid	Pons et al.	Late Cretaceous (Maastrichtian)	Cárdenas Formation	Mexico	A rudist bivalve; a new genus for "Durania" ojanchalensis Myers (1968).	
Ischnochiton ligusticus	Sp. nov	Valid	Dell'Angelo et al.	Pliocene (Zanclean)		Italy	A chiton, a species of Ischnochiton.	
Katherinella plummeri	Sp. nov	Valid	Garvie	Eocene	Reklaw Formation	United States	A bivalve belonging to the family Veneridae, a species of Katherinella.	
Kellia microstriatula	Sp. nov	Valid	Garvie	Eocene	Reklaw Formation	United States	A bivalve belonging to the family Lasaeidae, a species of Kellia.	
Lepidochitona pliocinerea	Sp. nov	Valid	Dell'Angelo et al.	Pliocene (Zanclean)		Italy	A chiton, a species of Lepidochitona.	
Leptochiton dellangelloi	Sp. nov	Valid	Sirenko	Middle Jurassic (late Callovian)		Russia	A leptochitonid chiton, a species of Leptochiton.	
Leptochiton josei	Sp. nov	Valid	Dell'Angelo et al.	Pliocene (Zanclean)		Italy	A chiton, a species of Leptochiton.	
Leptochiton liapini	Sp. nov	Valid	Sirenko	Middle Jurassic (late Callovian)		Russia	A leptochitonid chiton, a species of Leptochiton.	
Leptochiton shapovalovi	Sp. nov	Valid	Sirenko	Late Jurassic (late Oxfordian)		Russia	Originally described as a leptochitonid chiton and a species of Leptochiton; subsequently tentatively assigned to the genus Rissochiton within the family Nierstraszellidae.	
Mactra (Eomactra) piscinasina	Sp. nov	Valid	Garvie	Late Paleocene	Seguin Formation	United States	A bivalve belonging to the family Mactridae, a species of Mactra.	
Makoiamya	Gen. et sp. nov	Valid	Grant-Mackie	Late Triassic (Norian to Rhaetian)		New Caledonia; New Zealand	A ceratomyid bivalve. The type species is Makoiamya cotterallae.	
Megaporomya	Gen. et sp. nov	Valid	Ayoub-Hannaa et al.	Cretaceous (Albian to Turonian)	Cotinguiba Formation; Madiela Formation	Brazil; Gabon; Morocco	A bivalve belonging to the family Poromyidae. The type species is M. reymenti; genus might also include "Isocardia" supermensa White (1887) and "Liopistha (Psilomya)" walkeri Whitney (1952).	
Modiolus marquezensis	Sp. nov	Valid	Garvie	Eocene	Reklaw Formation	United States	A bivalve belonging to the family Mytilidae, a species of Modiolus.	
Nemocardium angelinae	Sp. nov	Valid	Garvie	Eocene	Reklaw Formation	United States	A cockle, a species of Nemocardium.	
Neokimbleia	Gen. et sp. et comb. nov	Valid	Mitchell	Early Cretaceous (Albian)	El Abra Formation; Fort Lancaster Formation	Mexico; United States	A caprinuloideid caprinoid rudist. The type species is Neokimbleia acutus; genus also contains "Caprina" planata Conrad (1855).	
Noetlingiconcha	Gen. et sp. nov	Valid	Hautmann & Hagdorn	Middle Triassic	Trochitenkalk Formation	Germany	A prospondylid bivalve. The type species is Noetlingiconcha speculostreum.	
Nucula (Gibbonucula?) seguinensis	Sp. nov	Valid	Garvie	Late Paleocene	Seguin Formation	United States	A bivalve belonging to the family Nuculidae, a species of Nucula.	
Nymphalucina panochensis	Sp. nov	Valid	Kiel	Early Paleocene		United States	A bivalve belonging to the family Lucinidae.	
Obscurania	Nom. et comb. et sp. nov	Valid	Devaere, Clausen & Steiner in Devaere et al.	Early Cambrian		China; France; Russia	A mollusc of uncertain phylogenetic placement, possibly related to the polyplacophoran stem-group. A replacement name for Obscurella Vassiljeva (1990). The type species is O. auriculata (Vassiljeva, 1990); genus also includes new species O. tormoi.	
Pholadomya (Bucardiomya) gigantica	Sp. nov	Valid	Jaitly	Middle Jurassic (middle Bathonian)	Goradongar Formation	India	A pholadomyid bivalve, a species of Pholadomya.	
Pisidium vukovici	Sp. nov	Valid	Neubauer, Mandic & Harzhauser	Middle Miocene		Bosnia and Herzegovina	A sphaeriid, a species of Pisidium.	
Polytorreites	Gen. et sp. nov	Valid	Mitchell & Skelton	Late Cretaceous (Campanian)		United States (Puerto Rico)	A hippuritid rudist. The type species is Polytorreites sohli.	
Praechlamys foezyi	Sp. nov	Valid	Szente	Late Jurassic (Tithonian)		Hungary	A scallop.	
Tehamatea	Gen. et comb. et 2 sp. nov	Valid	Kiel	Late Jurassic to Early Cretaceous		France; Spain; Ukraine; United States	A bivalve belonging to the family Lucinidae. The type species is "Lucina" ovalis Stanton (1895); genus also includes "Lucina" colusaensis Stanton (1895), as well as new species T. agirrezabalai and T. vocontiana.	
Totoralia reticulata	Sp. nov	Valid	Conway Morris & Peel	Cambrian	Burgess Shale	Canada	A helcionelloid, a species of Totoralia.	
Trechmannites	Gen. et comb. nov	Valid	Pons et al.	Late Cretaceous (Maastrichtian)		Jamaica; Mexico	A rudist bivalve; a new genus for "Biradiolites" rudissimus Trechmann (1924).	
Venericor densata newbyensis	Subsp. nov	Valid	Garvie	Eocene	Reklaw Formation	United States	A bivalve belonging to the family Carditidae, a subspecies of Venericor densata.	
Vulcanidas? goederti	Sp. nov	Valid	Kiel & Amano	Middle Eocene	Humptulips Formation	United States	A bathymodiolin mussel, a possibly a species of Vulcanidas.	
Youngicaprina	Gen. et 2 sp. nov	Valid	Mitchell	Early Cretaceous (Albian)		Mexico; United States	A caprinuloideid caprinoid rudist. The type species is Youngicaprina gloria; genus also contains Youngicaprina sangabrieli.	
