= Reklaw =

Reklaw may refer to:

== Places ==
- Reklaw, Texas, a city in Cherokee and Rusk Counties in the U.S. state of Texas
- Reklaw Formation, a geologic formation in Texas preserving fossils dating back to the Paleogene period.

== People ==
- Jesse Reklaw (born 1971), American cartoonist and painter, author of the syndicated dream-based comic strip Slow Wave
- The Reklaws, a Canadian country music duo
