= Ambercyclus espinosus =

Scientific classification
- Domain: Eukaryota
- Kingdom: Animalia
- Phylum: Mollusca
- Class: Gastropoda
- Subclass: Vetigastropoda
- Family: †Eucycloscalidae
- Genus: †Ambercyclus
- Species: †A. espinosus

Binomial name
- †Ambercyclus espinosus Ferrari, 2009

Extinct species of sea snail

Ambercyclus espinosus is a species of mollusk in the genus Ambercyclus.
