= Dolicrossea vesca =

Scientific classification
- Kingdom: Animalia
- Phylum: Mollusca
- Class: Gastropoda
- Subclass: Caenogastropoda
- Order: Littorinimorpha
- Family: Elachisinidae
- Genus: Dolicrossea
- Species: D. vesca

Binomial name
- Dolicrossea vesca Finlay, 1926

Species of gastropod

Dolicrossea vesca is a species of small sea snail in the family Elachisinidae.

== Distribution ==
This marine species occurs off New Zealand.
