= Ambercyclus =

Scientific classification
- Domain: Eukaryota
- Kingdom: Animalia
- Phylum: Mollusca
- Class: Gastropoda
- Subclass: Vetigastropoda
- Family: †Eucycloscalidae
- Genus: †Ambercyclus; Ferrari, Kaim, & S.E. Damborenea, 2014

Extinct genus of sea snails

Ambercyclus is an extinct genus of mollusk in the family Eucycloscalidae.

== Species ==
This genus contains 4 species:

- †Ambercyclus orbignyanus (Hudleston, 1892)
- †Ambercyclus ornatus (J. Sowerby, 1819)
- †Ambercyclus praetor (Goldfuss, 1844)
- †Ambercyclus espinosus (Ferrari, 2009)
