= Bartschella subangulata =

Scientific classification
- Kingdom: Animalia
- Phylum: Mollusca
- Class: Gastropoda
- Family: Pyramidellidae
- Genus: Bartschella
- Species: B. subangulata

Binomial name
- Bartschella subangulata (Carpenter, 1857)

Synonyms
- Dunkeria subangulata Carpenter, 1857 (original combination); Turbonilla subangulata (Carpenter, 1857)

Species of gastropod

Bartschella subangulata is a species of sea snail, a marine gastropod mollusk in the family Pyramidellidae, the pyrams and their allies.
