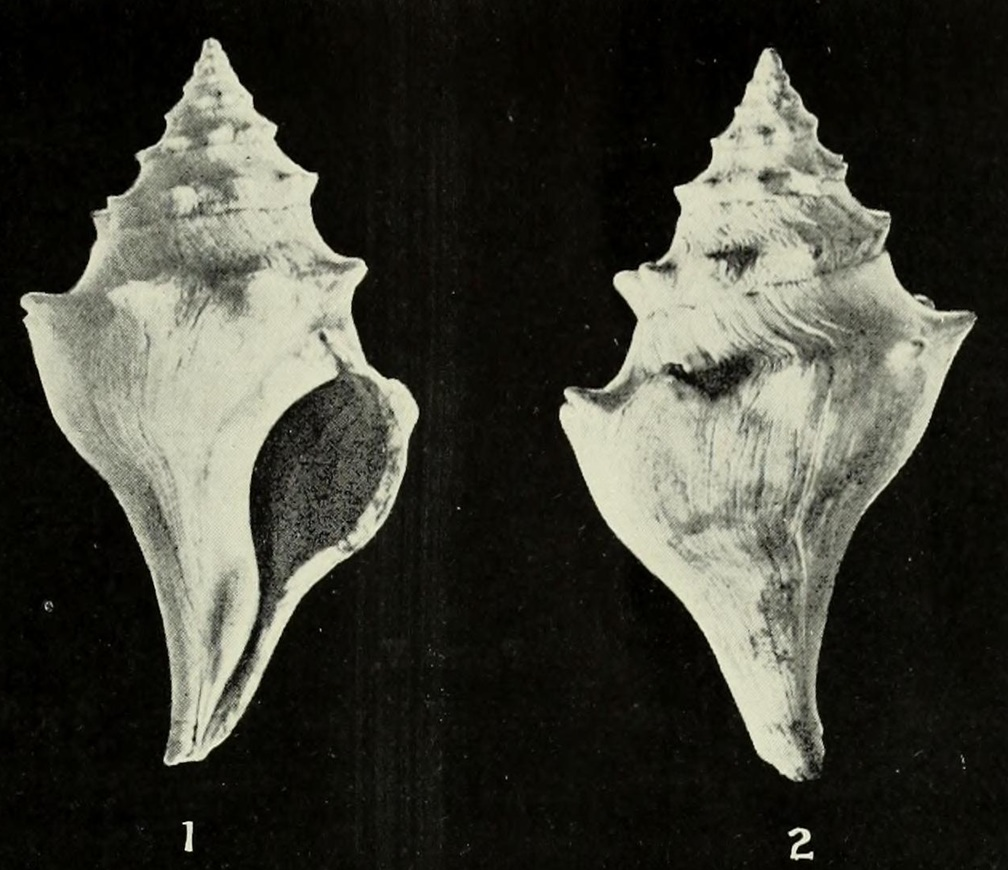
- Speightia spinosa

Scientific classification
- Kingdom: Animalia
- Phylum: Mollusca
- Class: Gastropoda
- Subclass: Caenogastropoda
- Order: Neogastropoda
- Family: †Speightiidae; A. W. B. Powell, 1942

Type genus
- Speightia (Suter, 1917)

Genera
- See text

= Speightiidae =

Speightiidae Temporal range: Paleocene–Eocene

Extinct family of gastropods

Speightiidae is an extinct taxonomic family of fossil sea snails, marine gastropod molluscs in the order Neogastropoda, currently not assigned to a superfamily.

== General characteristics ==
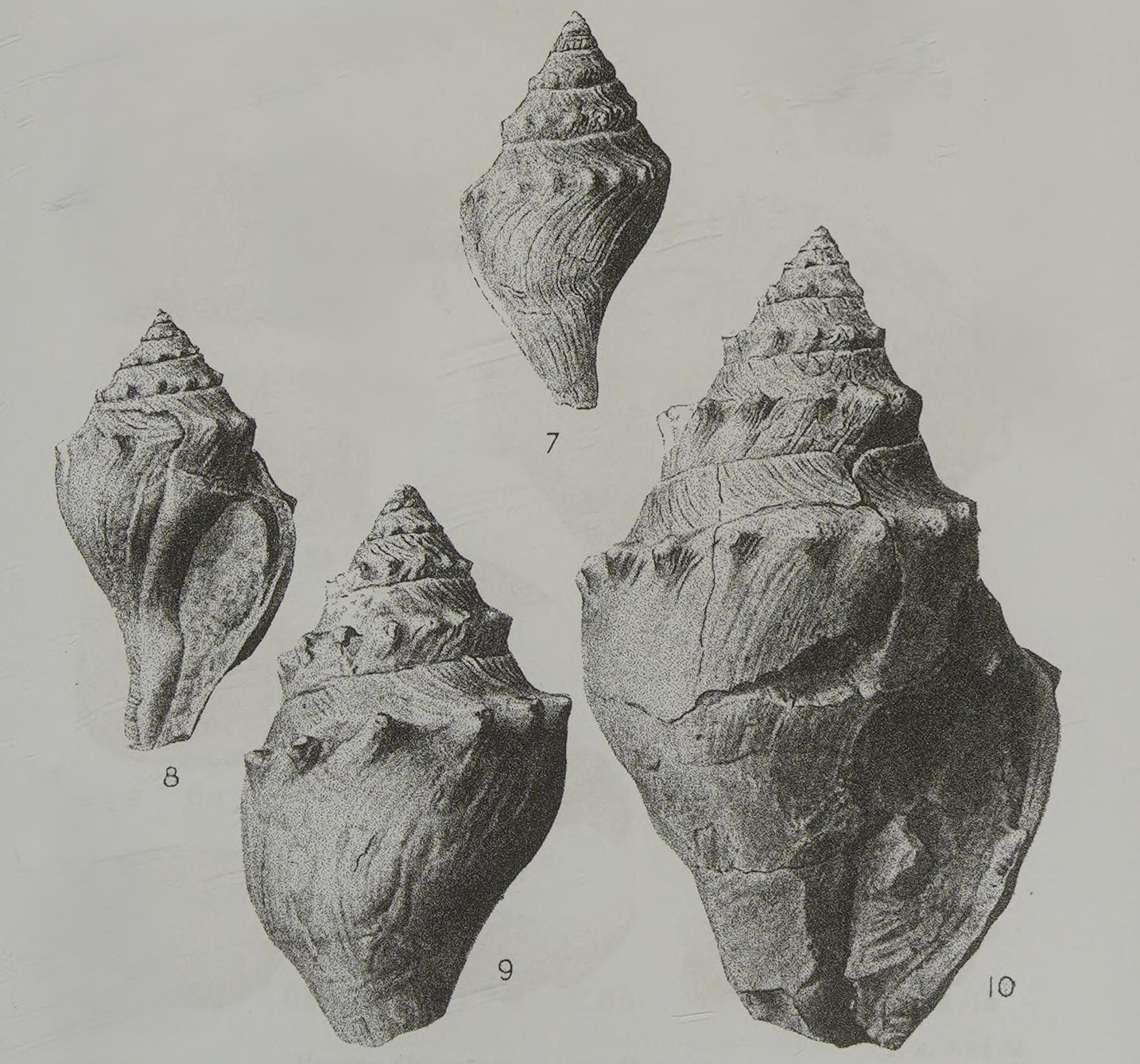
1922 illustration of Andicula occidentalis

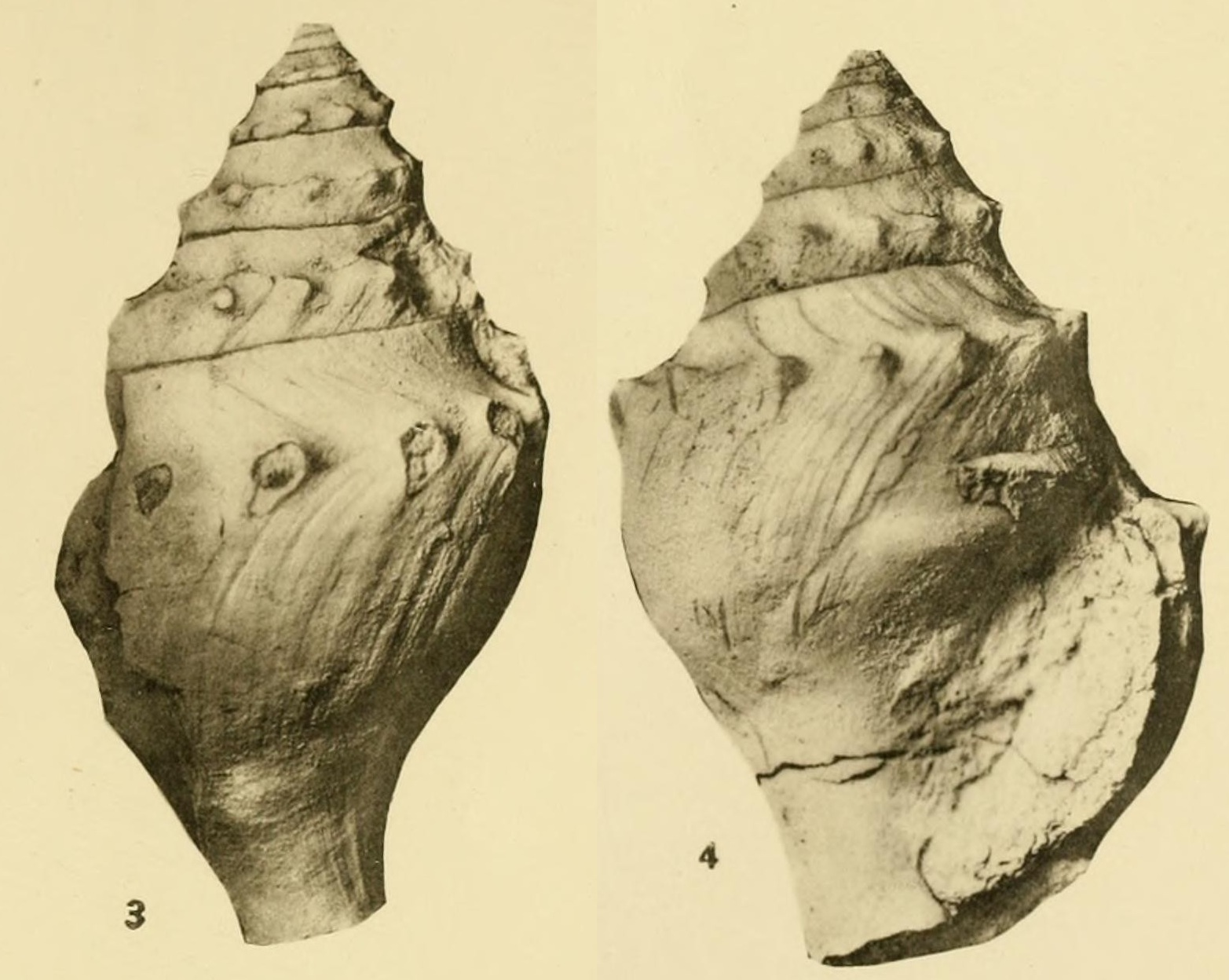
1929 illustration of Andicula occidentalis

Members of Speightiidae have biconic-fusiform shells, with a thickened pillar ridge. The family have a broadly and shallowly arcuate V-shaped sinus located on the shoulder slope, and a ridged and bent pillar.

== Taxonomy ==
The family was first described by A.W.B. Powell in 1942, after a suggestion by John Marwick that Speightia spinosa and Andicula occidentalis were representatives of an ancient lineage separate from Turridae. There are currently only two accepted genera within the family, Andicula and Speightia. Both of these are monotypic, including a single species each: Andicula occidentalis (H. Woods, 1922) and Speightia spinosa (Suter, 1917). The genus Clinuropsis was considered a part of the family by Powell, which is currently unassigned within the superfamily Conoidea.

The family was placed in Conoidea by Powell in 1996, and in 2005 Philippe Bouchet and Jean-Pierre Rocroi removed the family out of Conoidea, making it unassigned within the order Neogastropoda. It has been traditionally classified near the family Turridae. But in 1993 it was shown that many, if not all, species that were placed in this family should instead be placed in the family Fasciolariidae.

== Paleontology ==
Fossils of Speightiidae date to the Paleocene and Eocene, and have been found in Nigeria, Togo, Texas and New Zealand.

== Genera ==
Genera within the family Speightiidae include:

- † Andicula (H. Woods, 1922)
- † Speightia (Suter, 1917)
