= Dolicrossea =

Scientific classification
- Kingdom: Animalia
- Phylum: Mollusca
- Class: Gastropoda
- Subclass: Caenogastropoda
- Order: Littorinimorpha
- Family: Elachisinidae
- Genus: Dolicrossea; Iredale, 1924

Type species
- Crossea labiata Tenison Woods, 1876

Genus of gastropods

Dolicrossea is a genus of small sea snails in the family Elachisinidae.

== Species ==
- † Dolicrossea awamoana Finlay, 1930
- † Dolicrossea clifdenensis Finlay, 1930
- Dolicrossea labiata (Tenison Woods, 1876)
- † Dolicrossea lauta (Tate, 1890)
- † Dolicrossea sublabiata (Tate, 1890)
- Dolicrossea vesca Finlay, 1926

Species brought into synonymy

- † Dolicrossea atypica Laws, 1939: synonym of † Trochaclis atypica (Laws, 1939) (original combination)
- Dolicrossea bellula (A. Adams, 1865): synonym of Crosseola bellula (A. Adams, 1865)
