= Menesthella =

Scientific classification
- Kingdom: Animalia
- Phylum: Mollusca
- Class: Gastropoda
- Family: Pyramidellidae
- Tribe: Chrysallidini
- Genus: Menesthella; Nomura, 1939

Species
- See text.

Genus of gastropods

Menesthella is a genus of very small sea snails, pyramidellid gastropod mollusks, or micromollusks. This genus is currently placed in the subfamily Chrysallidinae of the family Odostomiidae. It was originally described as a subgenus of Menestho Möller, 1842 but was erected to genus status by Schander et al. 1999.

== Shell description ==
The shell is small, broadly conical and imperforate. The surface is marked by strong, equally spaced spiral chords and by fine axial growth-lines seen between the sutures. The periphery of the last whorl is sulcate and the base is smooth. The columella fold (tooth) is strong.

== Life habits ==
Little is known about the biology of the members of this genus. As is true of most members of the Pyramidellidae sensu lato, they are most likely to be ectoparasites.

== Species ==
Species within the genus Menesthella include:

- Menesthella tarukiensis (Nomura, 1939) (Type species) (as Menestho tarukiensis)
- ...
