= Subbalhaeceras =

Subbalhaeceras Temporal range: Olenekian

Scientific classification
- Kingdom: Animalia
- Phylum: Mollusca
- Class: Cephalopoda
- Subclass: †Ammonoidea
- Order: †Ceratitida
- Family: †Flemingitidae
- Genus: †Subbalhaeceras; Zakharov & Abnavi, 2012

Genus of molluscs (fossil)

Subbalhaeceras is a genus of ammonites which existed in what is now Russia during the Olenekian. It was described by Yuri D. Zakharov and Nasrin Mousavi Abnavi in 2012, and the type species is S. shigetai. The generic name means "nearly Balhaeceras", referring to the external resemblance the ammonite bears to the other genus, while the species epithet honours Yasunari Shigeta, of the National Museum of Nature and Science in Tsukuba, Japan.
