= Xenoceltites =

Xenoceltites Temporal range: Olenekian

Scientific classification
- Kingdom: Animalia
- Phylum: Mollusca
- Class: Cephalopoda
- Subclass: †Ammonoidea
- Order: †Ceratitida
- Family: †Xenoceltitidae
- Genus: †Xenoceltites; Spath, 1930

Extinct genus of molluscs

Xenoceltites is an extinct genus of ceratite ammonoid found worldwide in the Lower Triassic.

== Diagnosis ==
One of the earliest ceratites, Xenoceltites has a narrow planospiral shell with a compressed whorl section, that has a suture with two weakly toothed lateral lobes and irregular ribbing.

== Classification ==
Xenoceltites belongs to the Xenoceltitidae, a family within the order Ceratitida that with two others form the superfamily Xenodiscaceae.
