= Bartschella =

Scientific classification
- Kingdom: Animalia
- Phylum: Mollusca
- Class: Gastropoda
- Subcohort: Panpulmonata
- Superfamily: Pyramidelloidea
- Family: Pyramidellidae
- Genus: Bartschella; Iredale, 1916

Type species
- Dunkeria subangulata Carpenter, 1857

Genus of gastropods

Bartschella is a genus of small sea snails, marine gastropod mollusks in the family Pyramidellidae, the pyrams and their allies.

== Species ==
- Bartschella subangulata (Carpenter, 1857)
