= Exesilla =

Scientific classification
- Kingdom: Animalia
- Phylum: Mollusca
- Class: Gastropoda
- Superfamily: Pyramidelloidea
- Family: Pyramidellidae
- Subfamily: Turbonillinae
- Genus: Exesilla; Laseron, 1959

Type species
- Exesilla sulcata Laseron, 1959

Genus of gastropods

Exesilla is a genus of sea snails, marine gastropod mollusks in the family Pyramidellidae, the pyrams and their allies.

== Species ==
Species within the genus Exesilla include:

- Exesilla conicera (Laseron, 1959)
- Exesilla dextra (Saurin, 1959)
- Exesilla gisela (Thiele, 1925)
- Exesilla laseroni Robba, Di Geronimo, Chaimanee, Negri & Sanfilippo, 2004
- Exesilla sulcata Laseron, 1959
