= Carinopelta =

Scientific classification
- Kingdom: Animalia
- Phylum: Mollusca
- Class: incertae sedis
- Family: †Carinopeltidae; Parkhaev, 2013
- Genus: †Carinopelta; Parkhaev, 2013

Type species
- Trilobella levis

Species
- C. carinata (Parkhaev in Gravestock et al., 2001); C. levis (Vassiljeva, 1990)

Synonyms
- Family: Igarkiellidae Vassiljeva, 1998; Genus: Trilobella Vassiljeva, 1990; Igarkiella Vassiljeva, 1998; Species: Trilobella levis Vassiljeva, 1990; Igarkiella levis (Vassiljeva, 1990); Igarkiella carinata Parkhaev in Gravestock et al., 2001

Extinct genus of molluscs

Carinopelta is a genus within Carinopeltidae, an extinct family of Cambrian molluscs of uncertain position. It is in the superfamily Scenelloidea.

== Taxonomy ==
The taxonomy of the Gastropoda by Bouchet & Rocroi, 2005 categorizes Igarkiellidae in the superfamilia Scenelloidea within the Paleozoic molluscs of uncertain systematic position. This family has no subfamilies. According to P. Yu. Parkhaev in 2007, the family is within the superfamily Helcionelloidea Wenz, 1938 in the order Helcionelliformes Golikov & Starobogatov, 1975 within the subclass Archaeobranchia Parkhaev, 2001 in the class Helcionelloida Peel, 1991.

Carinopelta is one of six genera which was placed into the family, along with Protoconus, Rozanoviella, Gonamella, Mastakhella, and Squamiconus by P. Yu. Parkhaev in 2002.

== Homonymy ==
The type species was first described by N.I. Vassiljeva as "Trilobella" levis in 1990. The genus name was already preoccupied by "Trilobella" Woodward, 1924, itself a synonym of Triloba Vest, 1867 making Trilobella Vassiljeva a homonym. In 1998 a new genus, Igarkiella was erected for the species to correct the homonym status and in 2001 a new family Igarkiellidae was named for the genus. However the chosen genus name was again a homonym, already having been used by A.V. Rozova for the trilobite Igarkiella. In 2013 a new genus and family name were erected by Parkhaev to fully remove the homonym status of the species. Due to the family name Igarkiellidae being based on the invalid genus name, it too was invalid for use and the replacement family name Carinopeltidae was given.

== Etymology ==
Parkhaev coined the genus name Carinopelta as a combination of the Latin word carina meaning "keel" and pelta a type of oval shield used in Thrace.
