= Kashmirites =

- Model of Kashmirites subarmatus

Scientific classification
- Kingdom: Animalia
- Phylum: Mollusca
- Class: Cephalopoda
- Subclass: †Ammonoidea
- Order: †Ceratitida
- Family: †Xenoceltitidae
- Genus: †Kashmirites; Diener, 1913

Extinct genus of ammonites

Kashmirites is an extinct genus of ammonites from Permian to early Triasic included in the order Ceratitida. Kashmirites is highly abundant across the Oriental, western American, and Arctic regions.
