= Protorculidae =

Scientific classification
- Kingdom: Animalia
- Phylum: Mollusca
- Class: Gastropoda
- Subclass: Caenogastropoda
- Superfamily: †Pseudozygopleuroidea
- Family: †Protorculidae; Bandel, 1991

Extinct family of gastropods

†Protorculidae is an extinct family of fossil sea snails, marine gastropod molluscs in the clade Caenogastropoda.

== Genera ==
Genera within the family Protoculidae include:

- Anulifera
- Battenizyga
- Chulitnacula
- Moerkeia
- Protorcula
