= Ricinula =

Scientific classification
- Kingdom: Animalia
- Phylum: Mollusca
- Class: Gastropoda
- Subclass: Caenogastropoda
- Order: Neogastropoda
- Family: Muricidae
- Subfamily: Rapaninae
- Genus: Ricinula; Lamarck, 1816

Genus of gastropods

Ricinula is a genus of predatory sea snails, marine gastropod mollusks in the family Muricidae, the murex snails or rock snails.

Ricinula has become a synonym of Drupa Röding, 1798

== Species ==
Species within the genus Ricinula include:

- Ricinula hystrix (Lamarck, 1822): synonym of Drupa ricinus (Linnaeus, 1758)
- Ricinula nodus Lamarck, 1816: synonym of Drupa ricinus (Linnaeus, 1758)
