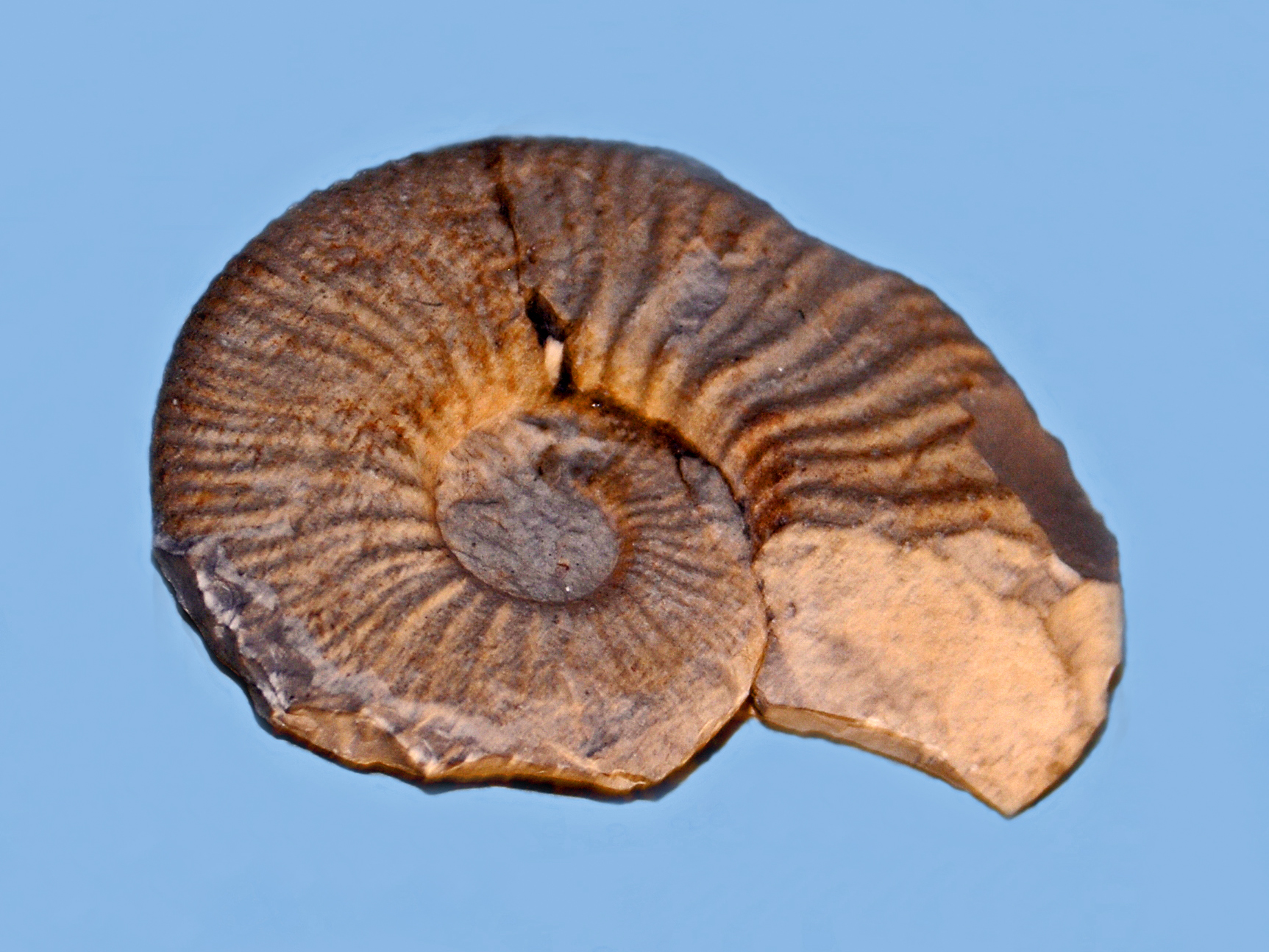
- Fossil shells of Pseudothurmannia species from Alpes-de-Haute-Provence, on display at Galerie de paléontologie et d'anatomie comparée in Paris

Scientific classification
- Kingdom: Animalia
- Phylum: Mollusca
- Class: Cephalopoda
- Subclass: †Ammonoidea
- Order: †Ammonitida
- Suborder: †Ancyloceratina
- Family: †Crioceratitidae
- Genus: †Pseudothurmannia; Spath, 1923

Synonyms
- Kakabadziella Hoedemaeker and Herngreen, 2003; Parathurmannia Busnardo, 2003; Prieuriceras Vermeulen, 2004

= Pseudothurmannia =

Pseudothurmannia Temporal range: Cretaceous, 136.4–99.7 Ma

Genus of molluscs (fossil)

Pseudothurmannia is a genus of extinct cephalopods belonging to the subclass Ammonoidea and included in the family Crioceratitidae of the ammonitid superfamily Ancylocerataceae. These fast-moving nektonic carnivores lived in the Cretaceous period, from Hauterivian age to Barremian age.

== Species ==
- Pseudothurmannia angulicostata d'Orbigny, 1863
- Pseudothurmannia belimelensis Dimtrova, 1967
- ?Pseudothurmannia biassalensis Dimtrova, 1967
- Pseudothurmannia catulloi Parona, 1898
- ?Pseudothurmannia crimensis Wiedmann, 1962
- Pseudothurmannia grandis Busnardo, 1970
- Pseudothurmannia isocostata Kakabadze, 1981
- Pseudothurmannia karakaschi Manolov, 1962
- Pseudothurmannia lurensis Busnardo, 1970
- Pseudothurmannia macilenta d'Orbigny, 1841
- Pseudothurmannia mortilleti Pictet and de Loriol, 1858
- Pseudothurmannia ohmi Winkler, 1868
- Pseudothurmannia picteti Sarkar, 1955
- Pseudothurmannia provencalis Wiedmann, 1962
- Pseudothurmannia pseudomalbosi Sarasin and Schandelmayer, 1901
- Pseudothurmannia renevieri Sarasin and Schöndelmayer, 1901
- Pseudothurmannia rugosa Busnardo, 2003
- Pseudothurmannia sarasini Sarkar, 1955

== Description ==
Shell of Pseudothurmannia species can reach a diameter of about 4–12 centimetres (1.6–4.7 in). They show flat or slightly convex sides, a surface with dense ribs and a subquadrate whorl section.

== Distribution ==
Fossils of species within this genus have been found in the Cretaceous rocks of Antarctica, Bulgaria, Czechoslovakia, France, Hungary, Italy, Japan, Morocco, Spain, Russia and United States.
