= Xenoceltitidae =

Scientific classification
- Domain: Eukaryota
- Kingdom: Animalia
- Phylum: Mollusca
- Class: Cephalopoda
- Subclass: †Ammonoidea
- Order: †Ceratitida
- Superfamily: †Xenodiscoidea
- Family: †Xenoceltitidae; Spath, 1930

Genera
- Anakashmirites; Kashmirites; Sulioticeras; Xenoceltites; Xenodiscoides

Xenoceltitidae are evolute, generally ribbed, upper Lower Triassic Ceratitida with ceratitic or goniatitic sutures; formerly included in the Noritaceae but now placed in the Xenodiscaceae.

The Xenoceltitidae are derived from the Ophiceratidae.
