= Anulifera =

Scientific classification
- Kingdom: Animalia
- Phylum: Mollusca
- Class: Gastropoda
- Subclass: Caenogastropoda
- Family: †Protorculidae
- Genus: †Anulifera; Zapfe, 1962

Extinct genus of gastropods

Anulifera is an extinct genus of fossil sea snails, marine gastropod molluscs in the family Protorculidae. In 2012, a new species, A. chubutensis, was described from the Early Jurassic period, (late Pliensbachian-early Toarcian) of Argentina by S. Mariel Ferrari.

== Species ==
Species within the genus Anulifera include:

- Anulifera chubatensis Ferrari, 2012
