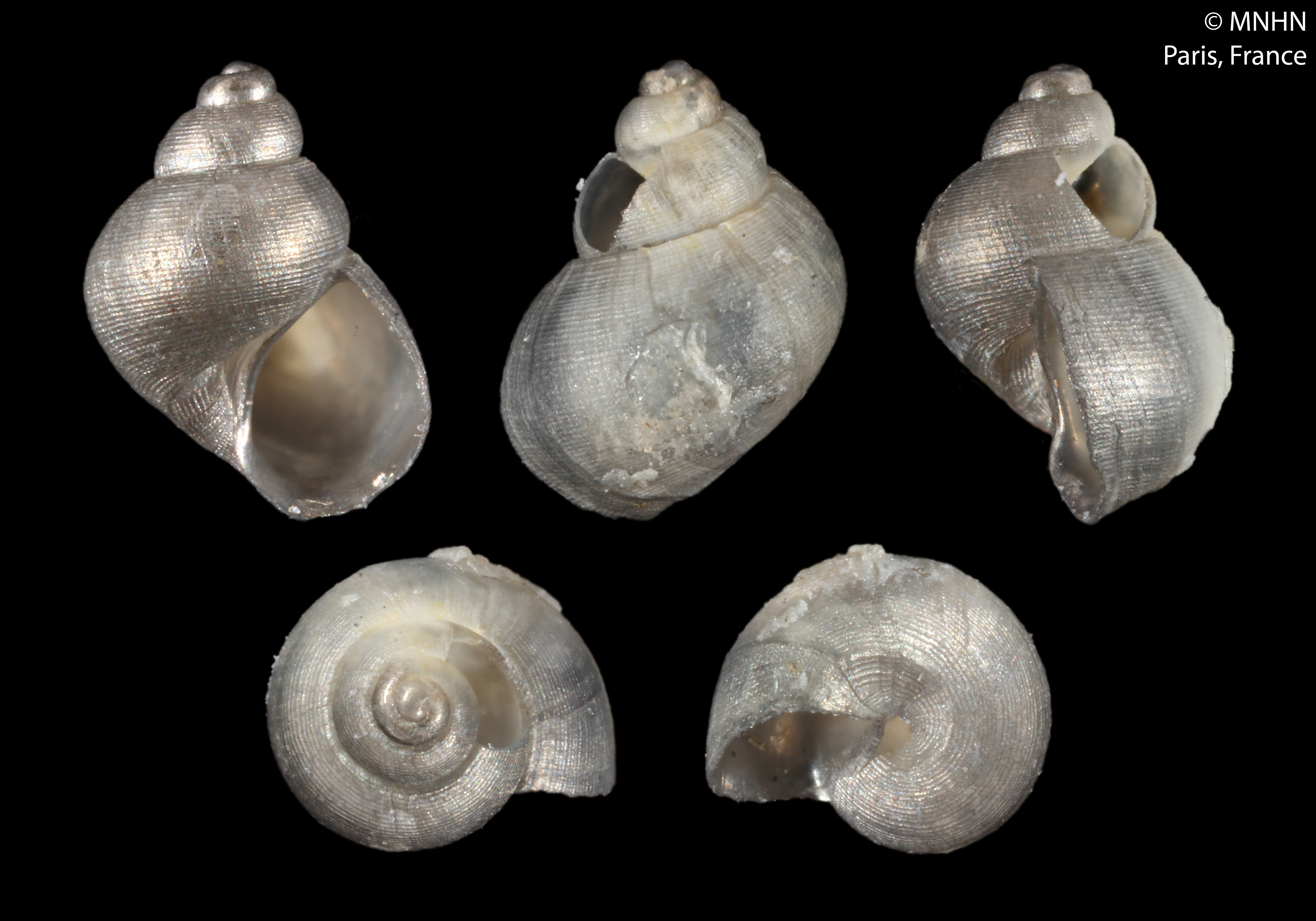
- Shell of Elachisina canarica (holotype at MNHN, Paris)

Scientific classification
- Kingdom: Animalia
- Phylum: Mollusca
- Class: Gastropoda
- Subclass: Caenogastropoda
- Order: Littorinimorpha
- Superfamily: Truncatelloidea
- Family: Elachisinidae
- Genus: Elachisina; Dall, 1918

Type species
- Elachisina grippi Dall, 1918

Synonyms
- Microdochus Rehder, 1943

= Elachisina =

Genus of gastropods

Elachisina is a genus of small sea snails in the family Elachisinidae.

== Species ==
- Elachisina azoreana Rolán & Gofas, 2003
- Elachisina bakeri (A. M. Strong, 1938)
- Elachisina canaliculata Rolán & Rubio, 2001
- Elachisina canarica (F. Nordsieck & Talavera, 1979)
- Elachisina catenata Rolán & Gofas, 2003
- Elachisina colellai Cunha, Santos & S. Lima, 2016
- Elachisina eritima (E. A. Smith, 1890)
- Elachisina floridana (Rehder, 1943)
- Elachisina globuloides (Warén, 1972)
- Elachisina grippi Dall, 1918
- Elachisina gubbiolii Rolán & Gofas, 2003
- Elachisina iredalei (Brookes, 1926)
- Elachisina johnstoni (F. Baker, Hanna & A. M. Strong, 1930)
- Elachisina pelorcei Rolán & Gofas, 2003
- Elachisina pergrandis Rolán & Gofas, 2003
- Elachisina robertsoni Kay, 1979
- Elachisina saxicola (C. B. Adams, 1852)
- Elachisina senegalensis Rolán & Gofas, 2003
- Elachisina tenuisculpta Rolán & Gofas, 2003

Species brought into synonymy

- Elachsina versiliensis Warén, Carrozza & Rocchini, 1990: synonym of Laeviphitus verduini van Aartsen, Bogi & Giusti, 1989
- Elachisina ziczac H. Fukuda & Ekawa, 1997: synonym of Nozeba ziczac (H. Fukuda & Ekawa, 1997) (original combination)
