= Weches Formation =

Geological formation in Louisiana and Texas, United States

- Stratigraphic range: Paleogene
- Type: Formation

Lithology
- Primary: sandstone, shale, clay
- Other: marl, limestone

Location
- Region: Louisiana, Texas
- Country: United States

The Weches Formation is a greensand, clay, and shale geologic formation in Louisiana and Eastern Texas. It preserves fossils dating back to the Paleogene period, specifically the Eocene.

== Description ==
The Weches Formation is a fossiliferous glauconite rich sand that graduates into a clay. It is considered one of the principal iron bearing beds in Eastern Texas, and is mined for sand in gravel in parts of Texas where exposed. The Weches Formation was originally called the Weches Greensand, and was considered a member of the Mount Selman Formation before being raised to formation status.

== See also ==
- List of fossiliferous stratigraphic units in Louisiana
- List of fossiliferous stratigraphic units in Texas
- Paleontology in Louisiana
- Paleontology in Texas
