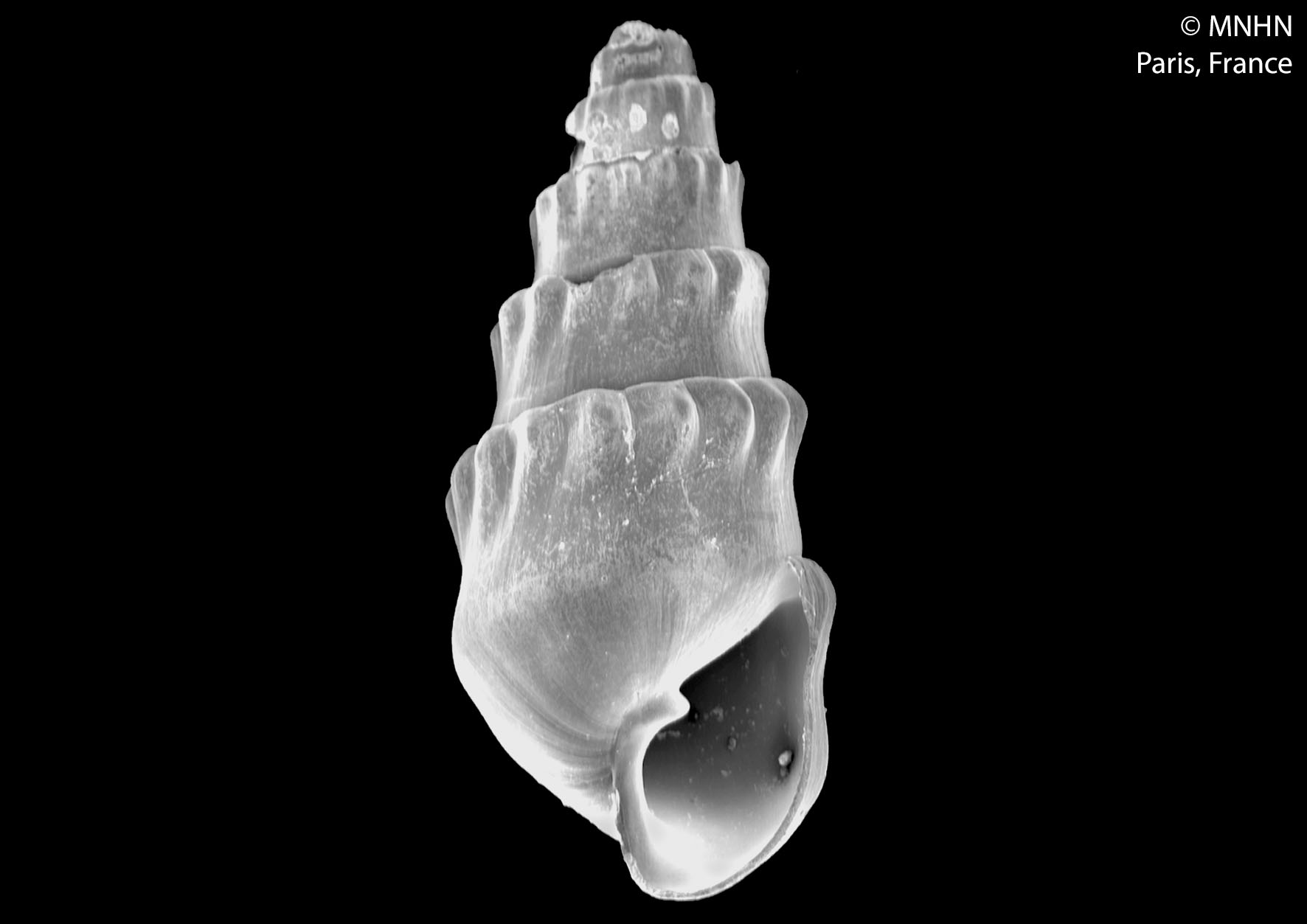
- Waikura coronata (holotype at MNHN, Paris)

Scientific classification
- Kingdom: Animalia
- Phylum: Mollusca
- Class: Gastropoda
- Subcohort: Panpulmonata
- Superfamily: Pyramidelloidea
- Family: Pyramidellidae
- Genus: Waikura; Marwick, 1931

Type species
- † Waikura torques Marwick, 1931

= Waikura =

Genus of gastropods

Waikura is a genus of very small sea snails, pyramidellid gastropod mollusks, or micromollusks. This genus is currently placed in the family Pyramidellidae.

== Shell description ==
The original description by Marwick (1931) says that the genus consists of small shells that are subconical with a telescopic spire. The protoconch is heterostrophic and immersed. The sculpture consists of tubercles on the shoulders that extends axially for a short distance. There are no spiral sculpture except on the subsutural border. The surface is smooth and polished. The aperture is subrhombic with a highly sinuous outer lip that is convex below. Columella has a week tooth at the top.

== Life habits ==
Little is known about the biology of the members of this genus. As is true of most members of the Pyramidellidae sensu lato, they are probably ectoparasites.

== Species ==
Species within the genus Waikura include:

- † Waikura circumdata Laws, 1941
- † Waikura clivosa Marwick, 1931
- Waikura coronata Peñas & Rolán, 2017
- † Waikura davidi Marwick, 1943
- † Waikura elevata P. A. Maxwell, 1988
- † Waikura finlayi Laws, 1941
- † Waikura hawera Laws, 1941
- † Waikura lawsi Robba, 2013
- † Waikura singularis Lozouet, 1998
- † Waikura teres Marwick, 1965
- † Waikura torques Marwick, 1931 (Type species)

Taxon inquirendum

- Waikura chabanesi (de Folin, 1870)
