= Sabaudiella =

Scientific classification
- Kingdom: Animalia
- Phylum: Mollusca
- Class: Cephalopoda
- Subclass: Ammonoidea
- Family: Leptoceratoididae
- Genus: Sabaudiella Vasicek & Hoedemaeker, 2003

Genus of molluscs (fossil)

Sabaudiella is a genus of ammonites. It was described by Vasicek and Hoedemaeker in 2003, and the type species is S. sabaudianus, which was originally assigned to the genus Ancyloceras by Pictet and de Loriol in 1858. A new species, S. riverorum, which existed during the early Barremian of what is now Argentina, was described by Beatriz Aguirre-Urreta and Peter F. Rawson in 2012.

Sabaudiella is also a genus of plants in family convolvulaceae.

== Species ==
- Sabaudiella sabaudianus (Pictet & de Loriol, 1858)
- Sabaudiella riverorum Aguirre-Urreta & Rawson, 2012
