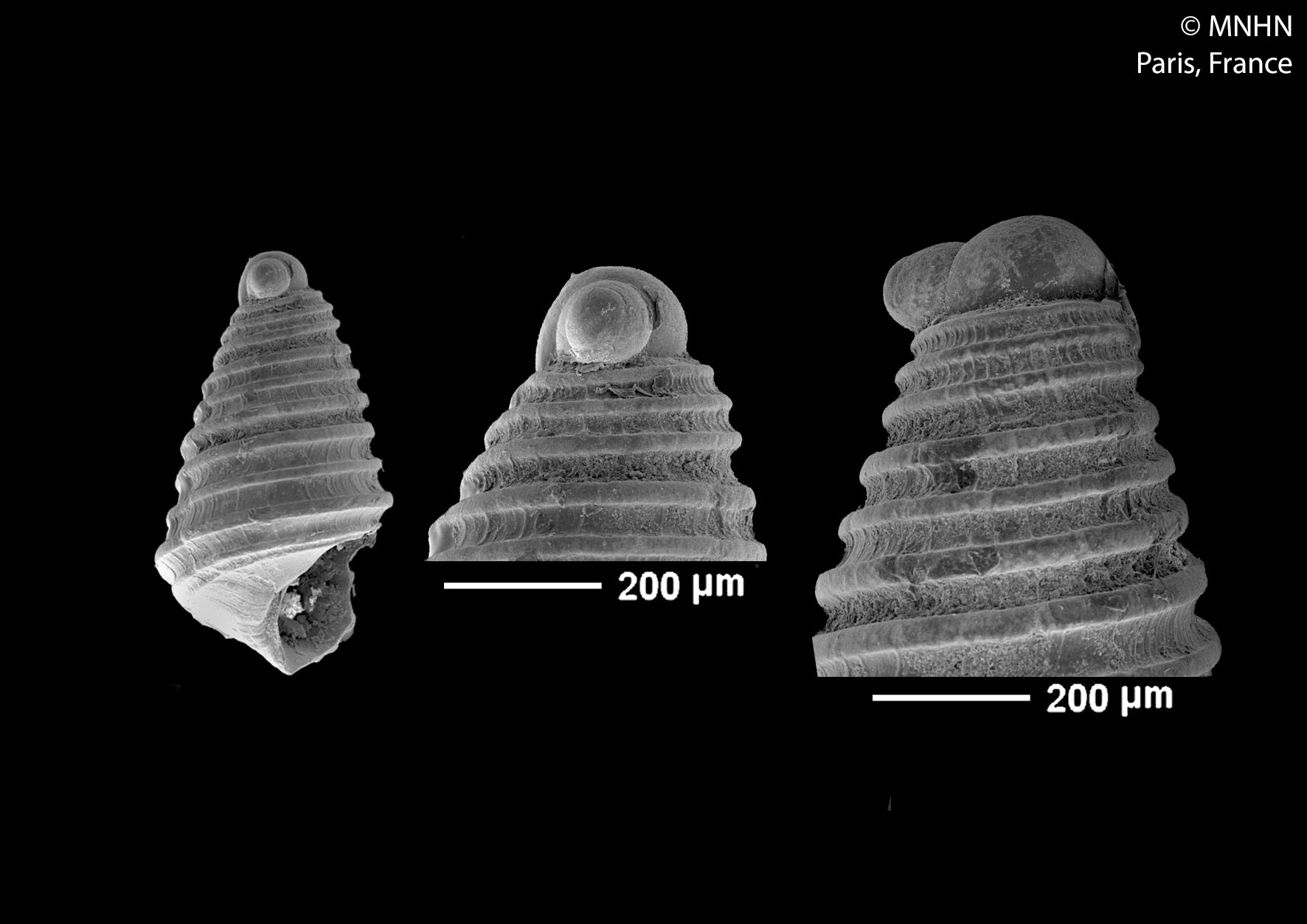
- Shell of Bulimoscilla fallax (specimen at MNHN, Paris)

Scientific classification
- Domain: Eukaryota
- Kingdom: Animalia
- Phylum: Mollusca
- Class: Gastropoda
- Subcohort: Panpulmonata
- Superfamily: Pyramidelloidea
- Family: Pyramidellidae
- Genus: Bulimoscilla; Robba, 2013

= Bulimoscilla =

Genus of gastropods

Bulimoscilla is a genus of sea snails, marine gastropod mollusk in the family Pyramidellidae, the pyrams and their allies.

== Species ==
Species within the genus Otopleura include:

- Bulimoscilla fallax (Thiele, 1925)

== Distribution ==
Species of this genus can be found in the Pacific Ocean off the Solomon Islands.
