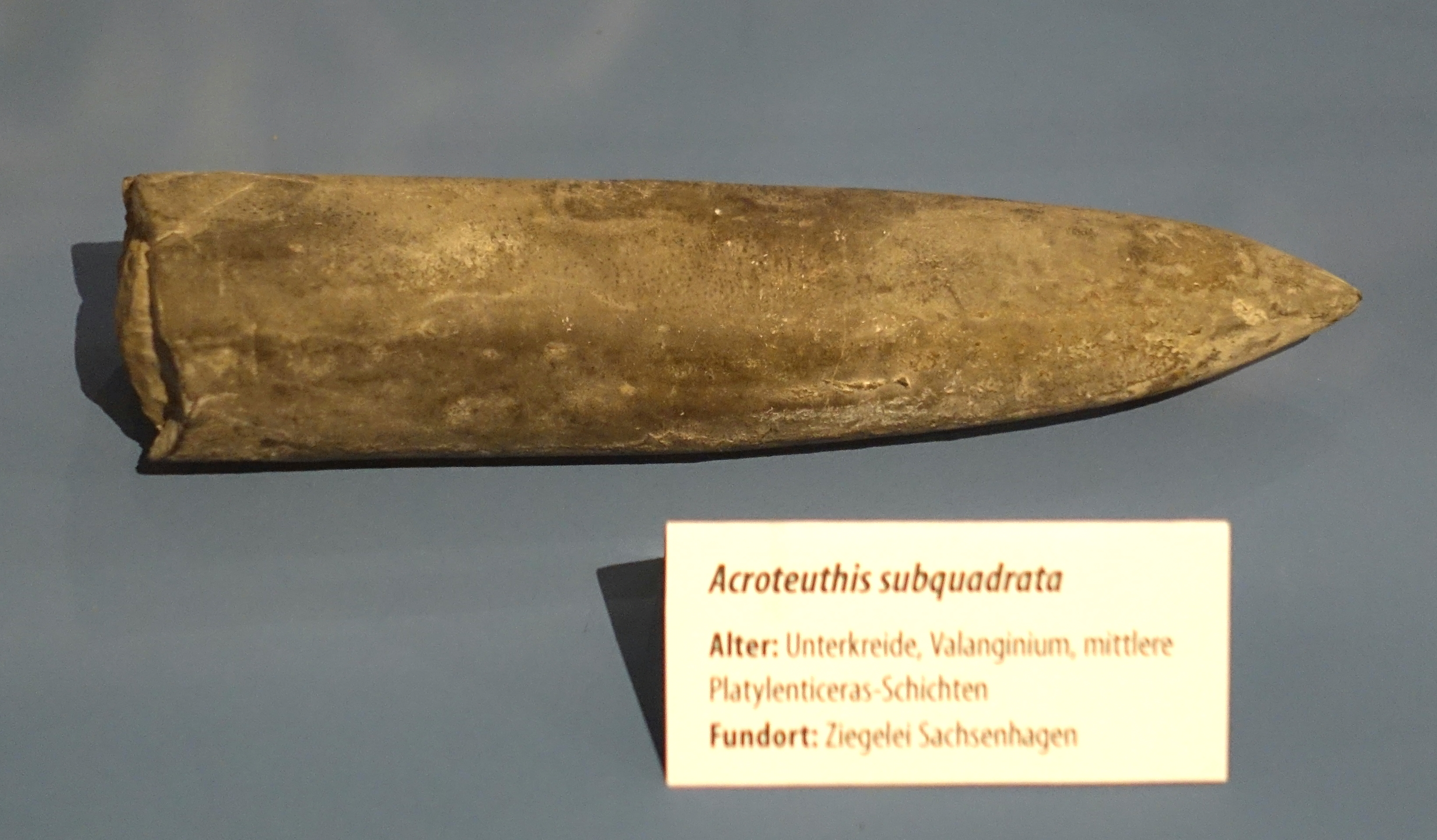
- Acroteuthis subquadrata

Scientific classification
- Kingdom: Animalia
- Phylum: Mollusca
- Class: Cephalopoda
- Superorder: †Belemnoidea
- Genus: †Acroteuthis; Stolley 1911

= Acroteuthis =

Acroteuthis Temporal range: 140.2–125.45 Ma

Extinct genus of molluscs

Acroteuthis is a genus of belemnite from the early Cretaceous of Asia, Europe, and North America.

== Sources ==
- Fossils (Smithsonian Handbooks) by David Ward (Page 161)
