= Totoralia =

Totoralia Temporal range: Stage 5 – Guzhangian

Scientific classification
- Domain: Eukaryota
- Kingdom: Animalia
- Phylum: Mollusca
- Class: †Helcionelloida
- Order: †Helcionelliformes
- Family: †Helcionellidae
- Genus: †Totoralia; Tortello and Sabattini, 2011

Species
- T. hornillensis (Rusconi, 1956) (type); T. reticulata Conway Morris & Peel 2013

Extinct genus of molluscs

Totoralia is a genus of limpet-like helcionellid known from Cambrian deposits including the Burgess Shale. It comprises two species. T. reticulata bears a net-like pattern spread over a series of concentric ridges.
