= Clinuropsis =

Scientific classification
- Kingdom: Animalia
- Phylum: Mollusca
- Class: Gastropoda
- Subclass: Caenogastropoda
- Order: Neogastropoda
- Superfamily: Conoidea
- Family: incertae sedis
- Genus: †Clinuropsis; Vincent, 1913

Genus of gastropods

Clinuropsis is a genus of extinct sea snails, marine gastropod molluscs unassigned in the superfamily Conoidea.

== Species ==
Species within the genus Clinuropsis include:

- †Clinuropsis ampla (Briart & Cornet, 1870)
- †Clinuropsis diderrichi É. Vincent, 1913
- †Clinuropsis powelli Gliozzi & Malatesta, 1985
- †Clinuropsis tuberculata Garvie, 2013
- †Clinuropsis yanceyi Garvie, 2013
