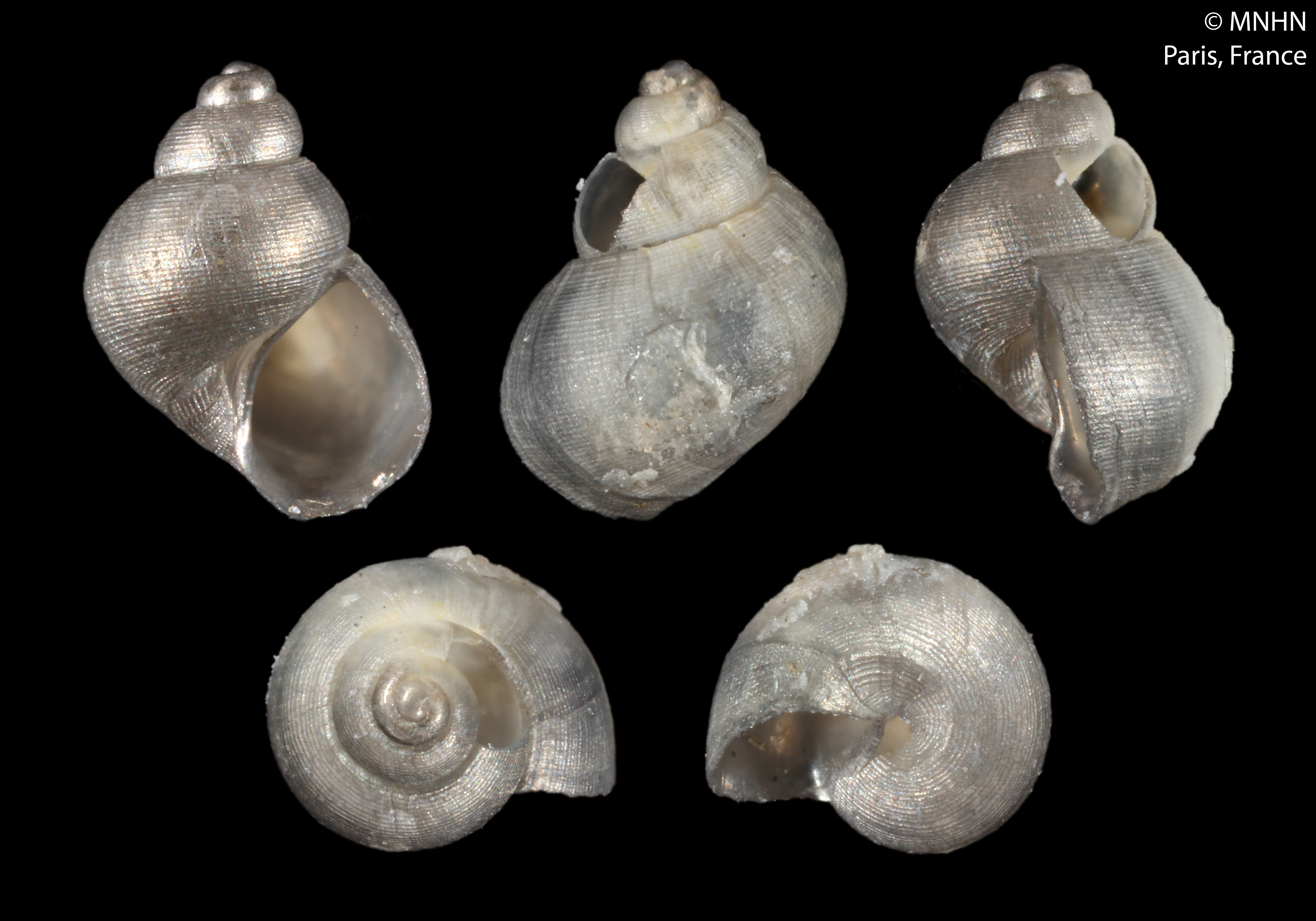
- Shell of Elachisina canarica

Scientific classification
- Kingdom: Animalia
- Phylum: Mollusca
- Class: Gastropoda
- Subclass: Caenogastropoda
- Order: Littorinimorpha
- Superfamily: Truncatelloidea
- Family: Elachisinidae; W.F. Ponder, 1985

= Elachisinidae =

Family of gastropods

Elachisinidae is a family of sea snails, marine gastropod molluscs in the superfamily Truncatelloidea and the order Littorinimorpha.

== Taxonomy ==
Genera within the family Elachisinidae include:

- † Cirsope Cossmann, 1888
- Dolicrossea Iredale, 1924
- Elachisina Dall, 1918
- † Entomope Cossmann, 1888
- † Lacunella Deshayes, 1861
- Laeviphitus van Aartsen, Bogi & Giusti, 1989
  - Laeviphitus verduini van Aartsen, Bogi & Giusti, 1989
- Ponderinella B. A. Marshall, 1988
- † Pseudocirsope O. Boettger, 1907

Genera brought into synonymy

- Microdochus Rehder, 1943: synonym of Elachisina Dall, 1918
