= Eucycloscalidae =

Scientific classification
- Domain: Eukaryota
- Kingdom: Animalia
- Phylum: Mollusca
- Class: Gastropoda
- Subclass: Vetigastropoda
- Superfamily: Seguenzioidea
- Family: †Eucycloscalidae; Gründel, 2007

Extinct family of sea snails

Eucycloscalidae is a family of mollusks in the superfamily Seguenzioidea.

== Genera ==
This family contains the following genera:

- †Ambercyclus Ferrari, Kaim, & S.E. Damborenea, 2014
- †Coelocentrus Zittel, 1882
- †Eucycloscala Cossmann, 1895
- †Marloffsteinia Nützel & Gründel, 2015
- †Nodosostrochus Gründel & Nützel, 2015
