= Karamaites =

Karamaites Temporal range: Albian–Cenomanian

Scientific classification
- Kingdom: Animalia
- Phylum: Mollusca
- Class: Cephalopoda
- Subclass: †Ammonoidea
- Order: †Ammonitida
- Family: †Placenticeratidae
- Genus: †Karamaites; Sokolov

Genus of molluscs (fossil)

Karamites is an extinct cephalopoda genus belonging to the Ammonoidea and included in the hoplitacean family Placenticeratidae.

Karamites lived during the latest Albian (late early Cretaceous), derived from Semenoviceras. It is the typical form for Central Asia where it occurs with members of the Hoplitidae, e.g. Anahoplites. It is also the direct ancestor of Late Cretaceous placenticeratids such as Placenticeras and Hypengonoceras.
