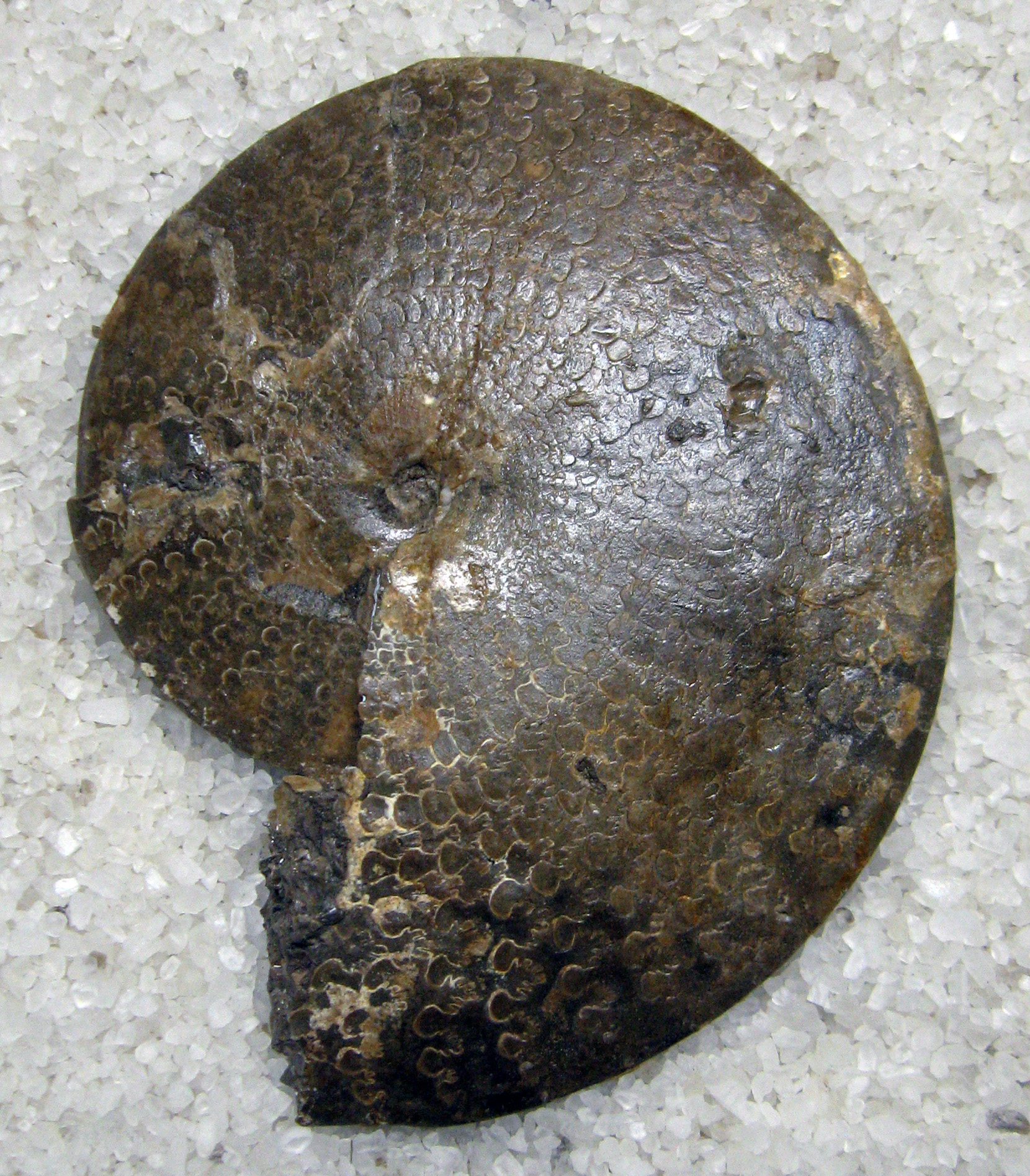
- A 11.5cm in diameter fossil Metengonoceras teigenense

Scientific classification
- Kingdom: Animalia
- Phylum: Mollusca
- Class: Cephalopoda
- Subclass: †Ammonoidea
- Order: †Ammonitida
- Superfamily: †Hoplitoidea
- Family: †Engonoceratidae; Hyatt, 1900

Species
- Engonoceras; Metengonoceras; Neolobites; Protengonoceras

= Engonoceratidae =

Engonoceratidae Temporal range: 122.46–89.3 Ma

Family of molluscs (fossil)

Engonoceratidae is a family of typically compressed, more or less flat sided and involute ammonites (cephalopod order Ammonitida) from the mid Cretaceous belonging to the Hoplitoidea. shells have flat sided outer rims ( venters), at least in some stage. Single or branching irregular ribs and variably placed tubercles may occur. Sutures have numerous auxiliary and adventive elements of similar form, in general radially arranged. Forwardly divergent saddles tend to be simple, without subdivision. Lobes, pointing apically, may be simple and undivided or may be frilled with short irregular serrations.

Some classifications go so far as to put the Engonoceratidae in its own superfamily, the Engonoceratoidea (.i.e. Engonocerataceae) although its direct descendant the Placenticeratidae is retained in the Hoplitoidea.

The Engonoceratidae first appear in the lower Albian. Origin in the Desheyesitidae has been suggested, but seems unlikely even without the Desheyesitidae being removed to the Ancyloceratina. Derivation from the Hoplitidae seems more likely, from something like Cleoniceras or Aioloceras by simplification and evening out of the suture.

The Engoceratidae gave rise in the Late Albian to the Placenticeratidae, which differ in having a more elaborate suture, before dying out in the Early Turonian.
