= Anadesmoceras =

Anadesmoceras Temporal range: Albian

Scientific classification
- Domain: Eukaryota
- Kingdom: Animalia
- Phylum: Mollusca
- Class: Cephalopoda
- Subclass: †Ammonoidea
- Order: †Ammonitida
- Family: †Hoplitidae
- Genus: †Anadesmoceras; Casey, 1954

Anadesmoceras is an hoplitid ammonite from the lower Albian (upper Lower Cretaceous) of England, included in the subfamily Cleoniceratinae. Anadesmoceras has a shell shaped more or less like a compressed Cleoniceras but with faint ornament only on the inner whorls. The shell has bundled growth striae. The aperture is preceded by several wide sinuous constrictions.
