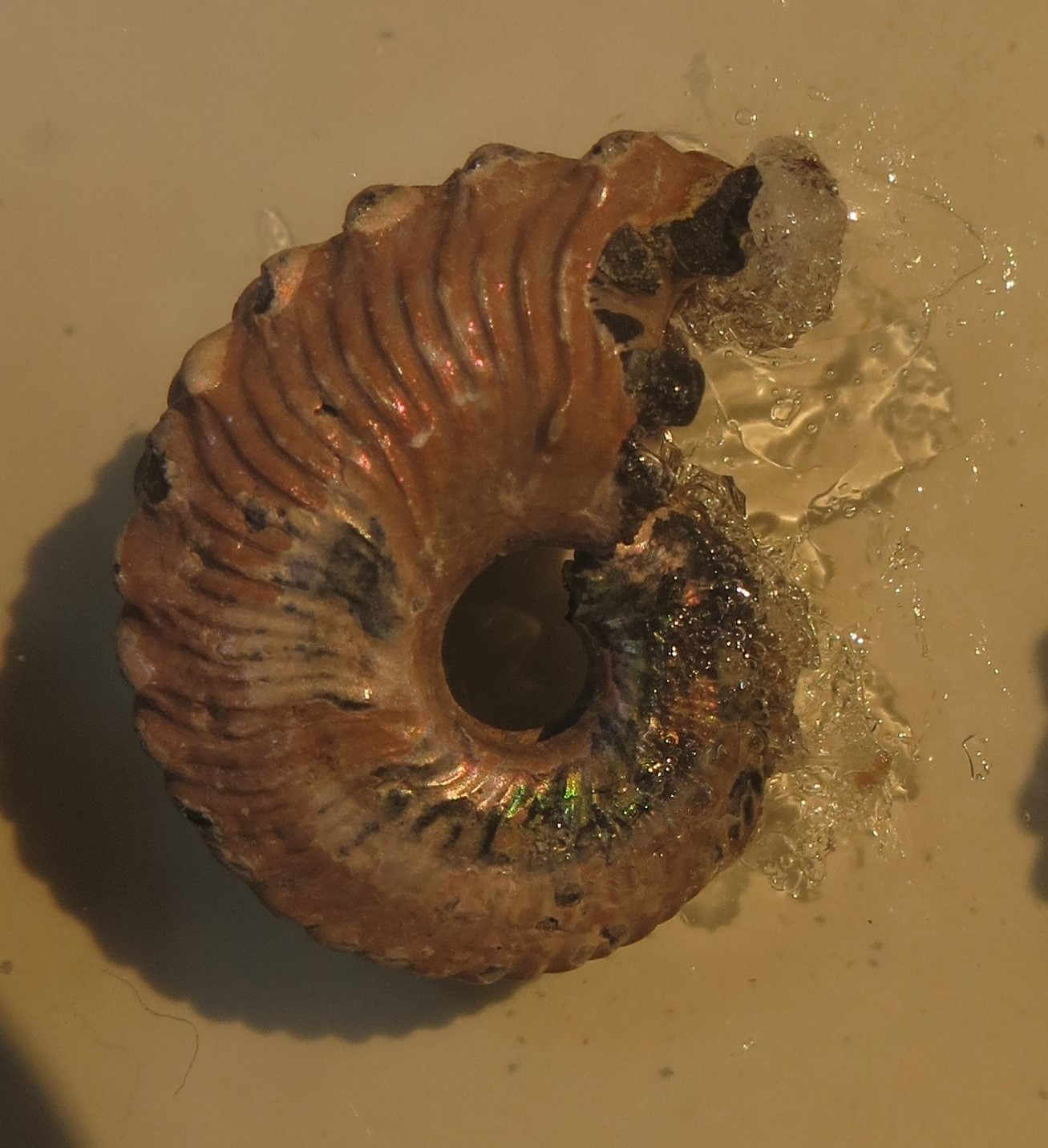
- E. subcrenatus

Scientific classification
- Kingdom: Animalia
- Phylum: Mollusca
- Class: Cephalopoda
- Subclass: †Ammonoidea
- Order: †Ammonitida
- Family: †Hoplitidae
- Subfamily: †Hoplitinae
- Genus: †Euhoplites; Spath, 1925

Type species
- Euhoplites truncatus Spath, 1925

Species
- E. loricatus Spath, 1925; E. lautus (J. Sowerby, 1821); E. ochetonotus (Seeley, 1865); E. subcrenatus Spath, 1925; E. alphalautus Spath, 1926; E. barroisi Amédro, 2013

Synonyms
- Euhoplitoides Cooper & Owen, 2011; Proeuhoplites Cooper & Owen, 2011

= Euhoplites =

Euhoplites Temporal range: Albian

Genus of molluscs (fossil)

Euhoplites is an extinct ammonoid cephalopod from the Lower Cretaceous, characterized by strongly ribbed, more or less evolute, compressed to inflated shells with flat or concave ribs, typically with a deep narrow groove running down the middle. In some, ribs seem to zigzag between umbilical tubercles and parallel ventrolateral clavi. In others the ribs are flexuous and curve forward from the umbilical shoulder and lap onto either side of the venter.

Fossils of this animal are commonly found in Lower Cretaceous, middle to upper Albian age strata.

Its shell was covered with lumps and bumps. The function of these adornments are unknown, although they may have been a source of hydrodynamic drag, preventing Euhoplites from swimming at high speeds. Studying them, therefore, may give some insight into the lifestyle of this ancient marine predator. Euhoplites was a small ammonite with shells of diameters of at most a few centimetres in diameter, depending on the age, species and possibly gender of the individual.

== Distribution ==
Euhoplites has been found in Middle and Upper Albian beds in France where it is associated respectively with Hoplites and Anahoplites, and with Pleurohoplites, Puzosia, and Desmoceras; in the Middle Albian of Brazil with Anahoplites and Turrilites; and in the Cenomanian of Texas. It is the most common ammonite fossil of the Folkstone (sometimes spelt "Folkestone") fossil beds in southeastern England where a variety of species are found.

== Classification ==
=== Taxonomic relations ===
Euhoplites is closely related to Hoplites and to other hoplitid genera such as Epihopites and Protohoplites included in the subfamily, Hopliitinae. Other subfamilies in the Hoplitidae, with more distantly related genera are the Cleoniceratinae and Gastrohoplitinae.

=== Species ===
In the past, big number of species have been attributed to this genus. In later research it has been found that species of Euhoplites have big intraspecific variability and most of the species are just synonyms. This is even the case of the type species E. truncatus, which is synonym of E. lautus.

==== E. loricatus ====
Synonyms:

- E. pricei Spath, 1925
- E. aspasia Spath, 1925
- E. microceras Spath, 1925
- E. subtuberculatus Spath, 1927
- E. meandrinus Spath, 1930
- E. neglectus Milbourne, 1963

Lateral ends of lautiform ribs that are strongly bent forward forms blades around concave furrow on the venter. Excavated siphonal line, which is characteristic for most of its descendants is missing in the case of this species. Due to intraspecific variability, many species have been erected that are now considered to be synonyms. These can be ordered from most compressed to thickest as E. aspasia, E. microceras, E. loricatus, E. pricei and E. subtuberculatus. E. loricatus var. meandrina has been formerly promoted to separate species, as its ribs do not start in the groups of 2, or 3, but in groups of 3, or 4. It is the youngest variation of E. loricatus, but now, this separation of it is not considered to be necessary. E. neglectus is considered to be a synonym of E. meandrinus.

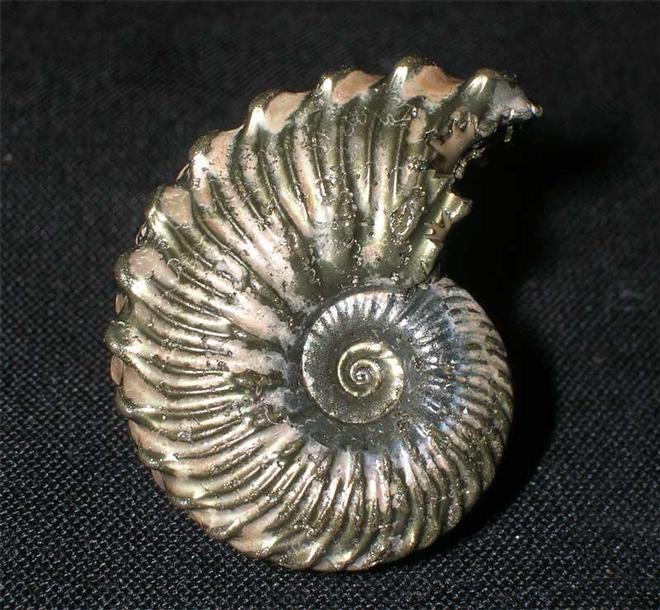
Euhoplites lautus (J. Sowerby, 1821), Cretaceous, Albian, Gault Clay, Folkestone, Kent, UK. Size of Ammonite = 25mm

==== E. lautus ====
Synonyms:

- E. truncatus Spath, 1925
- E. opalinus Spath, 1930
- E. nitidus Spath, 1925
- E. proboscideus J. Sowerby, 1921

Ammonite with strong lautiform ribs that are curved forward in the last third of the flank. It differs from its predecessor, E. loricatus by having excavated siphonal line with subrectangular section. There is big variability in the case of shell thickness. Old synonyms can be ordered by thickness from most compressed to thickest as E. lautus, E. truncatus, E. opalinus, E. nitidus and E. proboscideus. It has lived during middle and early part of upper Albian and gave rise to E. ochetonotus.

==== E. ochetonotus ====
Synonyms:

- E. sublautus Spath, 1928
- E. solenotus Seeley, 1865
- E. serotinus Spath, 1930
- E. trapezoidalis Spath, 1930
- E. armatus Spath, 1925

Ribs are subradial to flexuous and became attenuated on the living chamber. Venter is flat with siphonal canal and ventro-lateral clavi are slightly oblique to it. Forms of this species, which has been formerly considered to be valid species can be ordered from slimmest to thickest as E. ochetonotus, E. sublautus, E. solenotus, E. serotinus, E. trapezoidalis and E. armatus. It has been living during the base of upper Albian.

==== E. subcrenatus ====
Synonyms:

- E. inornatus Spath, 1930

Micromorph with very weakened ornamentation. Sigmoid ribs ends at the venter, where they create crenulations by both sides of siphonal canal. Its form, that has been named as formerly separate species E. inornatus is almost smooth. It lived during the early part of upper Albian.

==== E. alphalautus ====
Synonyms:

- E. vulgaris Spath, 1928
- E. boloniense Spath, 1926

Species with sigmoid ribs that tends to form crenulations on the ventro-lateral shoulder. Siphonal canal is tending to form shape of V and is less hollow than in the case of other species. Species that are now considered to be synonyms were based on the difference in their thickness. E. alphalautus is the thinnest one, while E. boloniense is the thickest one. This species lived during upper Albian.

==== E. barroisi ====
These ammonites had moderately evolute whorls, where umbilicus makes 29% of diameter. Whorld section is subhexagonal and biggest thickness is at the level of umbilical tubercules. Umbilical wall is rounded and flanks are slightly convex. Lautiform ribs begins at spiny umbilical tubercules and are tending strongly forward. They are joining at the strongly developed ventro-lateral clavi, which are pinched obliquely to siphonal line and are alternating on both sides. Some other ribs are zigzagging from umblical tubercules to ventro-lateral clavi. On the venter, there is deep concave groove. This is very well visible difference from its predecessor, E. lautus which had siphonal channel. Very similar is E. loricatus, which also has only ventral groove and is missing siphonal channel. Difference is, that in the case of E. loricatus, ventro-lateral clavi are not oblique to siphonal line, while they are oblique to it in the case of E. barroisi. Important difference is also in stratigraphy, as E. loricatus is middle albian species, while E. barroisi lived during upper Albian zone of Dipoloceras cristatum. There is a gap between their occurrence during the zone of Dimorphoplites biplicatus ammonite zone, during which, the only member of this genus was E. lautus.

== Evolution ==
Euhoplites has evolved during Lower Albian from Hoplites (Hoplites) canavarii. Among early species belonging to this genus were Euhoplites loricatus, E. aspasia, or E. meandrinus. These early species were added to genus Proeuhoplites, but this genus is by some authors considered to be synonym of Euhoplites. Later species have evolved channelled venter by which they differ from these early species. To these later species belongs for example Euhoplites truncatus, E. lautus, or E. elenae. In the Upper Albian, during Hysteroceras varicosum zone, Euhoplites inornatus has evolved. This differs greatly from contemporaneous members of this genus by not having channelled venter and it looked much more similar to genus Anahoplites. For this species a monotypic genus Euhoplitoides was proposed, but it is also considered to be just a synonym of Euhoplites. Latest members of this genus gave rise to genus Hyphoplites (Discohoplites).
