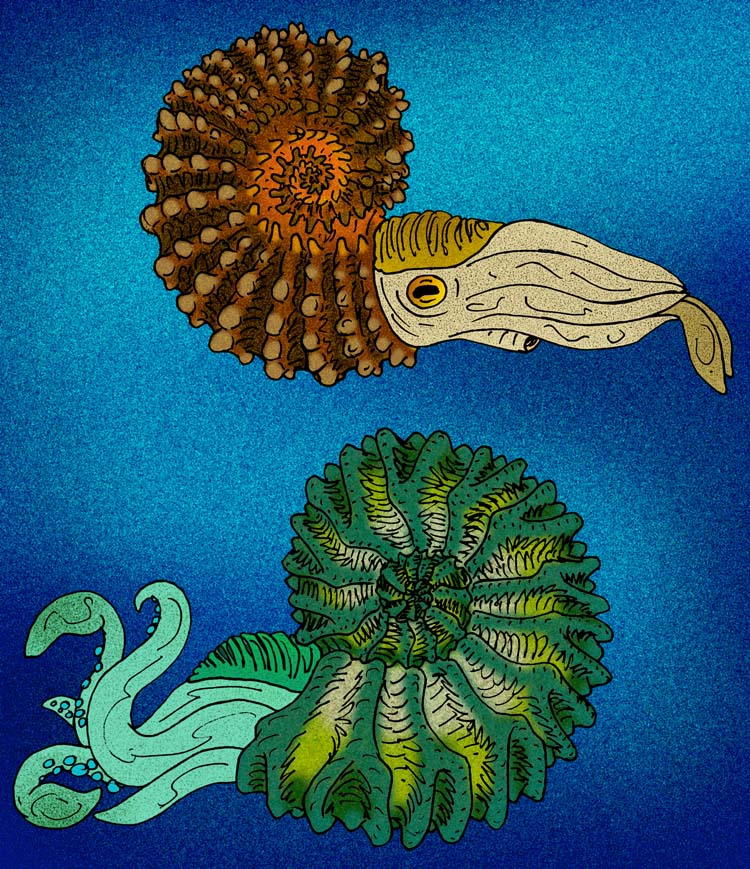
- Douvilleiceras mammilatum and Hoplites dentatus

Scientific classification
- Kingdom: Animalia
- Phylum: Mollusca
- Class: Cephalopoda
- Subclass: †Ammonoidea
- Order: †Ammonitida
- Family: †Hoplitidae
- Subfamily: †Hoplitinae
- Genus: †Hoplites; Neumayr, 1875

Type species
- Ammonites dentatus (Sowerby, 1821)

Subgenera
- H. (Hoplites) Neumayr, 1875; H. (Isohoplites) Casey, 1954

Synonyms
- Amedroites Cooper & Owen, 2011; Daghestanites Glazunova, 1953; Lautihoplites Baraboshkin, 1996; Odonthoplites Breistroffer, 1947

= Hoplites (ammonite) =

Hoplites Temporal range: Albian

Genus of molluscs (fossil)

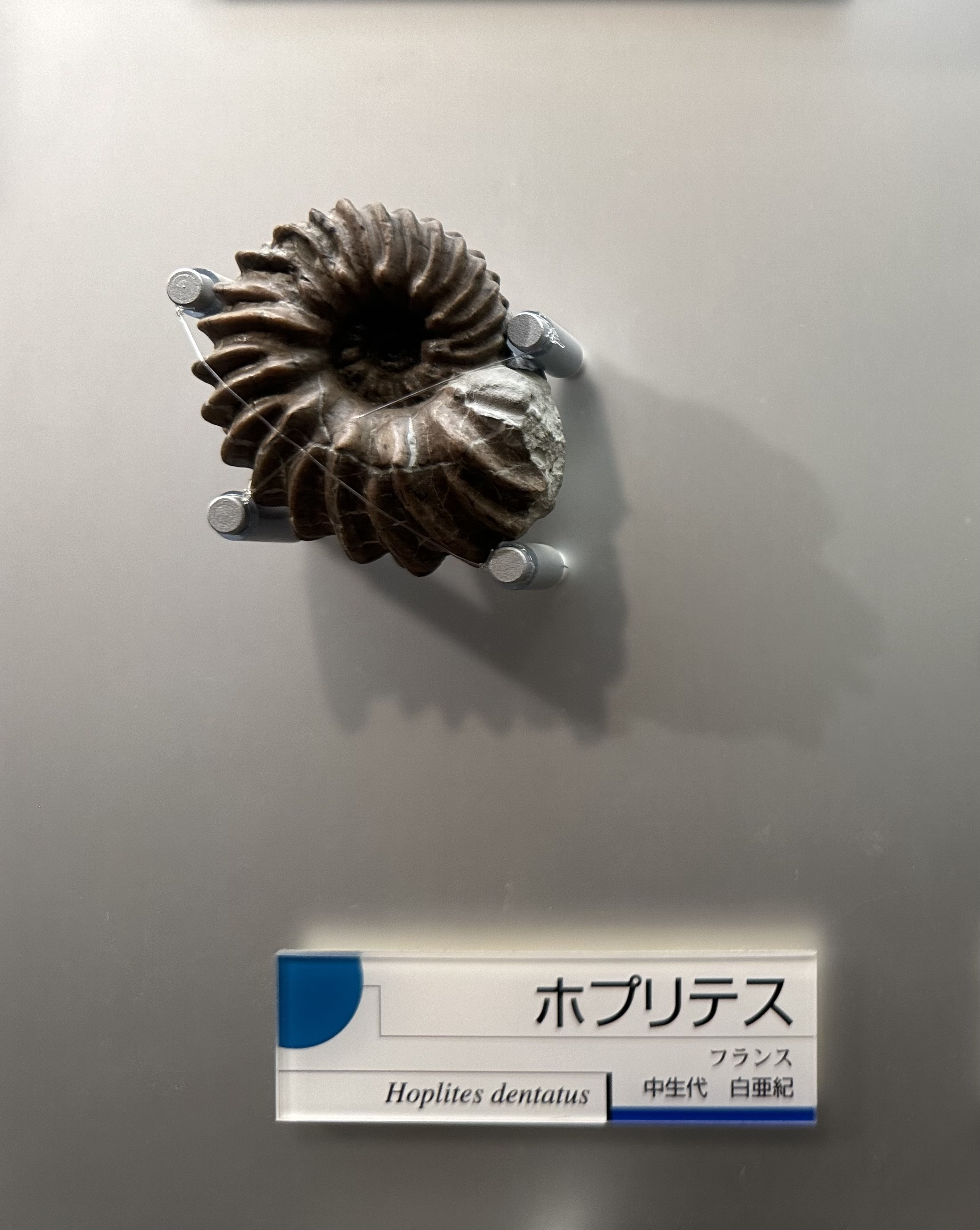
A fossil in Toyohashi Museum of Natural History

Hoplites is a genus of ammonite that lived from the Early Albian to the beginning of the Middle Albian. Its fossils have been found in Europe, Transcaspia and Mexico. Shell has compressed, rectangular till depressed and trapezoidal whorl section. There are strong umbilical bullae from which, prominent ribs are branching and these are interrupted on venter. Ends of ribs on the venter are prominent and can be both alternate or opposite. Some species have zigzagging ribs and these ribs ends usually thickened, or they can be raised into ventrolateral tubercles. These tubercles are mostly oblique clavi.

== Evolution ==
Subgenus H. (Isohoplites) has evolved in Early Albian from Otohoplites normanniae that gave rise to H. (I.) steinmanni, which is the only member of subgenus Isohoplites. From this, subgenus Hoplites has evolved and gave subsequently rise to Anahoplites (from H. (H.) dentatus) and Euhoplites (from H. (H.) canavarii).
