= Ammolite =

Opal-like organic gemstone

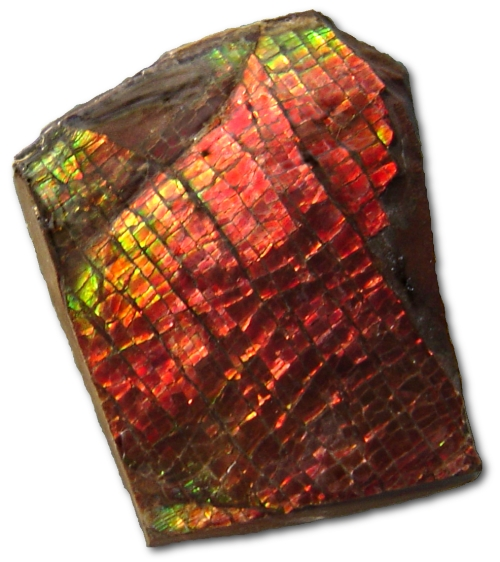
- Unprocessed sample of ammolite; a "dragon skin" pattern is apparent

General
- Category: fossilized, mineralized Ammonite shell
- Formula: CaCO_{3} aragonite polymorph, with minor amounts of calcite, pyrite, silica, and other impurities

Identification
- Color: Gray to brown, can be radiant blue, with primarily red to green iridescence.
- Cleavage: no true cleavage
- Fracture: uneven to granular
- Mohs scale hardness: 3.5 - 4.5
- Luster: greasy to dull
- Specific gravity: usually about 2.70 (varies with mineral content)
- Polish luster: vitreous
- Optical properties: anomalous aggregate reaction
- Refractive index: usually 1.52 - 1.68 (varies with mineral content)
- Birefringence: 0.135 - 0.145
- Pleochroism: none
- Ultraviolet fluorescence: variable

Ammolite is an organic gemstone found primarily along the eastern slopes of the Rocky Mountains of North America. It is commonly unearthed by natural erosion or through the process of various mining practices, within the perimeter of an ancient sea bed called the Western Interior Seaway. It is made of the fossilized shells of ammonites, which in turn are composed primarily of aragonite, the same mineral contained in nacre, with a microstructure inherited from the shell. It is one of few biogenic gemstones; others include amber and pearl. (Note: Ammolite gemstones are distinguished from other organically produced, precious ornamental materials, such as ivory, mother of pearl, tortoiseshell, etc., primarily by the ways in which they are used. Pearls, amber, and ammolite are considered to be jewels, while the others are treated more as textural objects.)

In 1981, ammolite was given official gemstone status by the World Jewellery Confederation (CIBJO), the same year commercial mining of ammolite began. It was designated the official gemstone of Lethbridge, Alberta, Canada in 2007, and was subsequently designated as Alberta's official gemstone in April 2022.

Ammolite is also known as aapoak (Kainah for "small, crawling stone"), gem ammonite, calcentine, and korite. The latter is a trade name given to the gemstone by the Alberta-based mining company Korite. Marcel Charbonneau and his business partner Mike Berisoff were the first to create commercial doublets of the gem in 1967. They went on to form Ammolite Minerals Ltd.

== Properties ==
The chemical composition of ammolite is variable, and aside from aragonite may include calcite, silica, pyrite, or other minerals. The shell itself may contain a number of trace elements, including: Aluminium, barium, chromium, copper, iron, magnesium, manganese, strontium, titanium, and vanadium.

- Its crystal structure is orthorhombic.
- Its hardness is 3.5–4.5.
- Its specific gravity is 2.60–2.85 g/cm³.
- The refractive index of Canadian material (as measured via sodium light, 589.3 nm) is biaxial negative, with α = 1.522 ; β = 1.672–1.673 ; γ = 1.676–1.679 .
- Under ultraviolet light, ammolite may fluoresce a mustard yellow.

An iridescent opal-like play of color is shown in fine specimens, mostly in shades of green and red; all the spectral colors are possible, however. The iridescence is due to the microstructure of the aragonite: Unlike most other gems, whose colors come from light absorption, the iridescent color of ammolite comes from interference with the light that rebounds from stacked layers of thin platelets that make up the aragonite. The thicker the layers, the more reds and greens are produced; the thinner the layers, the more blues and violets predominate. Reds and greens are the most commonly seen colors, owing to the greater fragility of the finer layers responsible for the blues. When freshly quarried, these colors are not especially dramatic; the material requires polishing and possibly other treatments in order to reveal the colors' full potential.

The ammolite itself is actually a very thin sheet, c. 0.5–0.8 mm (0.02–0.03 inches) in thickness. Rarely is ammolite without its matrix, which is typically a grey to brown shale, chalky clay, or limestone. So-called "frost shattering" is common; exposed to the elements and compressed by sediments, the thin ammolite tends to crack and flake; prolonged exposure to sunlight can also lead to bleaching. The cracking results in a tessellated appearance, sometimes described as a "dragon skin" or "stained glass window" pattern. Ammolite mined from deeper deposits may be entirely smooth or with a rippled surface.

Occasionally a complete ammonite shell is recovered with its structure well-preserved: fine, convoluted lines delineate the shell chambers, and the overall shape is suggestive of a nautilus, which is a different cephalopod type, species of which have survived to the present day. While these shells may be as large as 90 cm (35.5 inches) in diameter, the iridescent ammonites (as opposed to the pyritized variety) are typically much smaller. Most fossilized shells have had their aragonite pseudomorphously replaced by calcite or pyrite, making the presence of ammolite particularly uncommon.

== Origin ==
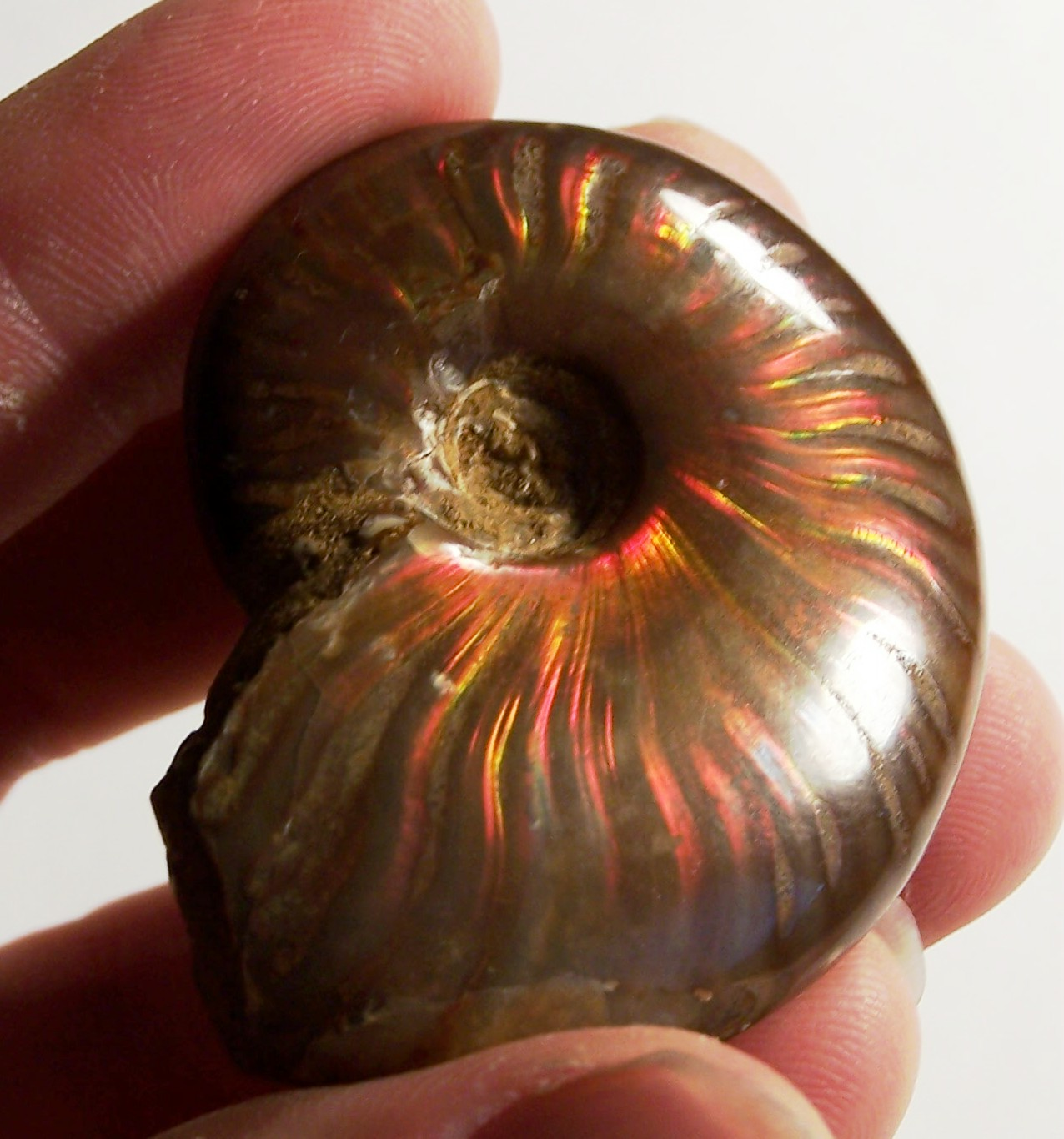
An iridescent ammonite from Madagascar

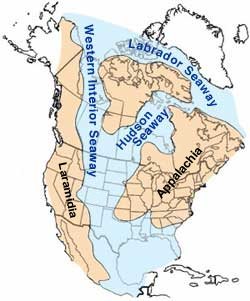
Map of North America highlighting the shallow inland sea present during the mid-Cretaceous period.

Ammolite comes from the fossil shells of the Upper Cretaceous disk-shaped ammonites Placenticeras meeki and Placenticeras intercalare, and (to a lesser degree) the cylindrical baculite, Baculites compressus. Ammonites were cephalopods, that thrived in tropical seas until becoming extinct along with the dinosaurs at the end of the Mesozoic era.

The ammonites that form ammolite inhabited a prehistoric, inland subtropical sea that bordered the Rocky Mountains—this area is known today as the Cretaceous or Western Interior Seaway. As the ammonites died, they sank to the bottom and were buried by layers of bentonitic mud that eventually became shale. Many gem-quality ammonites are found within siderite concretions. These sediments preserved the aragonite of the shells, preventing it from converting to calcite.

== Occurrence ==
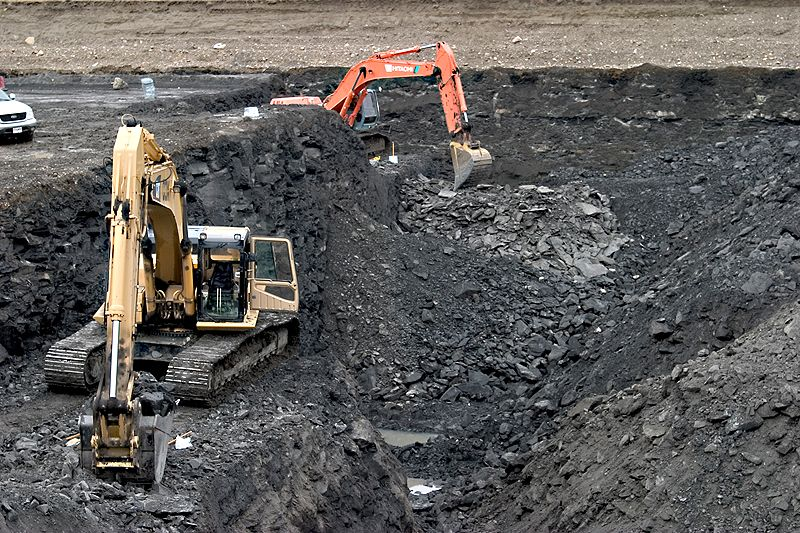
Korite's mechanized mining operations are fairly basic, involving the excavation of shallow pits with backhoes.

Significant deposits of gem-quality ammolite have only been found in the Bearpaw Formation that extends from Alberta to Saskatchewan in Canada and south to Montana in the USA. However, small deposits have been found as far south as Central Utah which also contains gem-quality ammolite.

The best grade of gem quality ammolite is along high energy river systems on the eastern slopes of the Rockies in southern Alberta. Most commercial mining operations have been conducted along the banks of the St. Mary River, in an area south of and between the town of Magrath and the city of Lethbridge. Roughly half of all ammolite deposits are contained within the Kainah (Kainaiwa) reserve, and its inhabitants play a major role in ammolite mining.

Since its founding in 1979, Korite has operated primarily within the reservation. The company had an agreement with the Kainah (Blood) tribe, with Korite paying the tribe royalties based on how much land the company has mined. This agreement has expired. It prohibited the Blood Tribe members from surface mining along the banks and cliffs of the St. Mary River. There were about 35 licensed Blood surface miners in 2018. The surface miners are self employed mining in all kinds of weather. Some miners also restore the fossils they find or resell their finds to other fabricators.

== Extraction ==
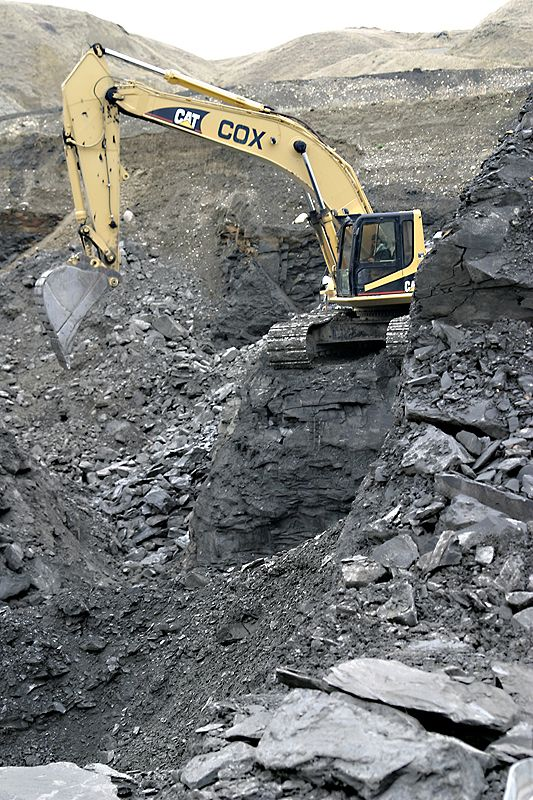
Another view of Korite's open-pit mining operations in Alberta, Canada.

Commercial extraction is mechanized but fairly basic: shallow open pits are dug with an excavator and the excavated material is screened for its potential gem contents. The pits are further examined by hand, and commercial production is supplemented by individuals who sell their surface-picked findings to Korite and several other producers. Approximately 50% of the ammolite mined is suitable for jewelry. Korite, the largest miner of ammolite, produces over 90% of the world's supply.

The ammolite deposits are stratified into several layers: the shallowest of these layers, named the "K zone", lies some 15 meters below the surface and extends 30 meters down. The ammolite within this layer is covered by siderite concretions and is usually cracked — this is the crush material. It is the most common and (generally speaking) the least valuable form of ammolite. Beginning twenty meters below the crush material is the "blue zone"; ammolite from this zone, which extends 65 meters, is usually compressed with a thin layer of pyrite rather than siderite concretions. This is the sheet material; due to its depth it is rarely mined. It is also much less fractured, and therefore a more valuable form of ammolite.

As of 2015, Korite has mined over 100 acres of ammolite deposits. The company employs over 280 people and accounts for approximately 90 percent of world gem ammolite production. Prospectors who wish to mine ammolite deposits on Crown land must apply to the Alberta Department of Energy for a lease. These leases are not regularly offered; as of 2004, there was a CAD $625 application fee, with an annual rental fee of CAD$3.50 per hectare.

== Gemstone quality ==
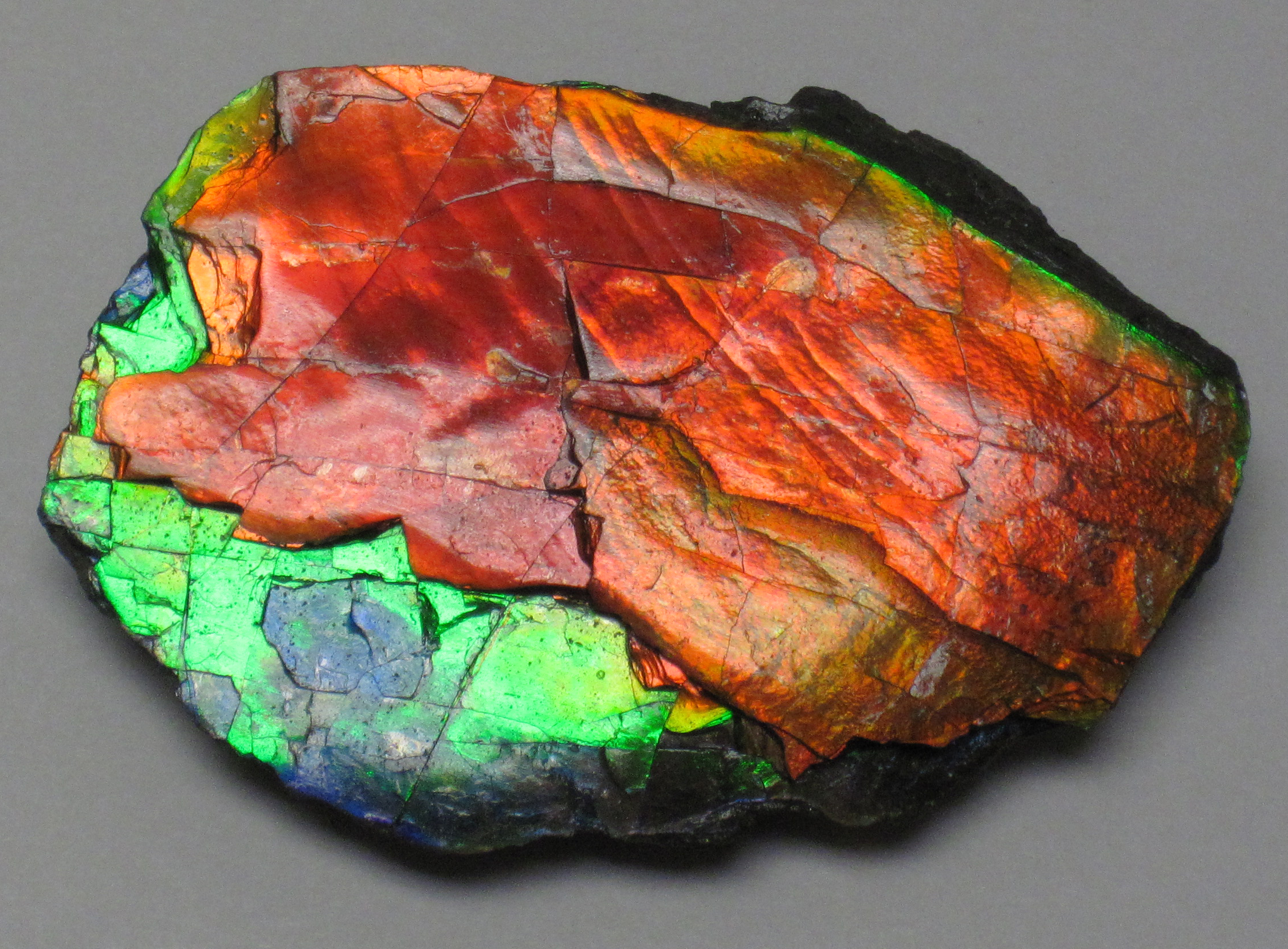
Placenticeras ammolite specimen, from Bearpaw Formation, Campanian Stage, upper Upper Cretaceous, ~70-75 Ma.

The quality of gem ammolite is communicated via a letter grade system, from most desirable to least desirable: AAA; AA; A+; A; and A−. However, this system is not yet standardized and some vendors may use their own systems. The grade and therefore the value of an ammolite gemstone is determined by the following criteria:

The number of primary colors
A large array of color is displayed in ammolite, including all the spectral colors found in nature. Red and green are far more common than blue or purple due to the latter's fragility (see properties). There are also certain hues, like crimson or violet or gold, which are derived from a combination of the primary colors, that are the rarest and in highest demand. The most valuable grades have three or more primary colors or 1–2 bright and even colors, with the lowest grades having one comparatively dull color predominant.

The way the colors "play" (chromatic shift and rotational range)
Chromatic shift is how the colors vary with the angle of viewing and the angle of light striking the gemstone. In higher grades this variation is almost prismatic in its scope, while lower grades show very little variation. Rotational range is how far the specimen can be turned while maintaining its play of color; the best rotate 360° uncompromised, while lesser stones may exhibit highly directional colors that are only visible within a narrow rotational range, down to 90° or less. Intermediate grades have ranges of 240°–180°.

Brightness of colors and iridescence
The brightness of colors and their iridescence is essentially dependent on how well-preserved the nacreous shell is, and how fine and orderly the layers of aragonite are. The quality of the polish is also a factor. The "dragon skin" cracking usually hinders its value; the most prized ammolite is the sheet type (see formation) that has broad, uninterrupted swathes of color similar to the "broad flash" category of opal. The matrix is not visible in finer grades, and there should be no foreign minerals breaking up or diminishing the iridescence.

The thickness of the ammolite layer is also an important factor: after polishing, the ammolite is only 0.1–0.3 millimeters thick. The rarest and most valuable are thick enough to stand alone, with only a thin portion of its original matrix (not exceeding 1.5 mm); but the vast majority require some sort of supportive backing. Other treatments are also commonly undertaken; all other factors being equal, the less treatment an ammolite gem has received, the more valuable it is. Calibrated stones—that is, stones fashioned into standard dimensions that will fit most jewelry settings—may also command a higher price.

== Treatments ==
Ammolite is often damaged due to environmental exposure, even though it is fully mineralized and contains no water — therefore it is not subject to dehydration and subsequent crazing seen in opals. The thin, delicate sheets in which ammolite occurs are also problematic; for these reasons, most material is impregnated with a clear epoxy or other synthetic resin to stabilize the flake-prone ammolite prior to cutting. Although the tessellated cracking cannot be repaired, the epoxy prevents further flaking and helps protect the relatively soft surface from scratching.

The impregnation process was developed over a number of years by Korite in partnership with the Alberta Research Council. Impregnated and epoxy-coated ammolite first entered the market in 1989 and the treatment significantly increased the availability and durability of the gem.

Because the ammolite layer is usually mere fractions of a millimeter in thickness, most ammolite gems are in fact composite stones: These usually take the form of two-part doublets, with the ammolite layer adhered to a dark backing material. This is usually the matrix or mother rock from which the ammolite was quarried; black onyx or glass could also be used as backing. In composites where the ammolite layer is exceptionally thin, a third component is used: This constitutes a triplet, with a durable and transparent convex topping piece. This cap may be either synthetic spinel, synthetic corundum, synthetic quartz, or in lower-end productions, glass. The convex cap acts as a lens and has the effect of enhancing the ammolite's iridescent display.

The detection of these treated and composite stones is relatively simple via inspection with a loupe; however, certain jewelry setting styles—such as those with closed backs—can complicate things. A triplet can be identified by inspecting the stone in profile; the top of the stone can then be seen to be domed and transparent, with no play of color. If the dome is made of glass, bubbles, swirl marks, and scratches may be present; the harder synthetic materials are optically flawless.

Although the vast majority of commercial-grade ammolite has been treated in some way, a small fraction of production requires no treatment other than cutting and polishing. Ideally, any treatments should be disclosed at the time of sale.

== Imitations ==
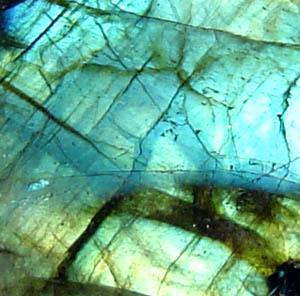
The iridescent flashes (labradorescence) of labradorite may lead to its confusion with ammolite by the unfamiliar, but the overall appearance is unconvincing as an imitation.

Ammolite is neither easily nor often imitated; however, a few materials have a passing resemblance that may deceive the unfamiliar. These include: labradorite (also known as spectrolite), an iridescent feldspar that may also be of Canadian origin; and broad-flash black opal. Neither are convincing substitutes, and the latter is actually of greater value than ammolite. Indeed, ammolite is often used as an imitation of black opal. An even less convincing possibility is Slocum stone, a common glass-based imitation of opal. Blues and purples are much more pervasive in labradorite, and in both it and opal the play of color is seen to roll across the stone unlike the comparatively restricted play of color in ammolite. In Slocum stone, the play of color takes the form of tinsel-like patches. The visible structure is also considerably different; in the imitations, the body of the stone is transparent to translucent from certain angles, whereas ammolite is entirely opaque.

Gemologically speaking, ammolite can be grouped with the shell-based marbles. This group includes lumachella or "fire marble", a similarly iridescent marble composed of fossilized clam and snail shells. Found in Italy and Austria, lumachella is rarely if ever used in jewelry; rather, it is used as a decorative facing stone or in mosaics. The iridescence of lumachella is fragmentary and not nearly as brilliant as that of ammolite. Despite these differences, lumachella may be considered synonymous with ammolite in some circles.

The predominantly blue-green iridescent shell of abalone (or paua; genus Haliotis) is one last possible imitation. Abalone shell is inexpensive and plentiful owing to the commercial mariculture of these gastropods for their meat. The shell's structure is distinctive: sinuous bands of blue, green, and rose iridescence are delineated by dark brown lines of conchiolin, a proteinaceous material that holds the shell together. The luster of abalone shell is silky rather than the near vitreous luster of polished ammolite, and the colors of the two materials do not closely approximate. However, some abalone shell has been dyed and given a transparent cap of synthetic quartz, forming a doublet in the same fashion as ammolite. These doublets are perhaps the most deceptive, and have also been used to imitate opal. Under magnification most abalone doublets will show dye concentrated along certain areas and air bubbles trapped at the shell-quartz interface.

== Use in jewelry ==
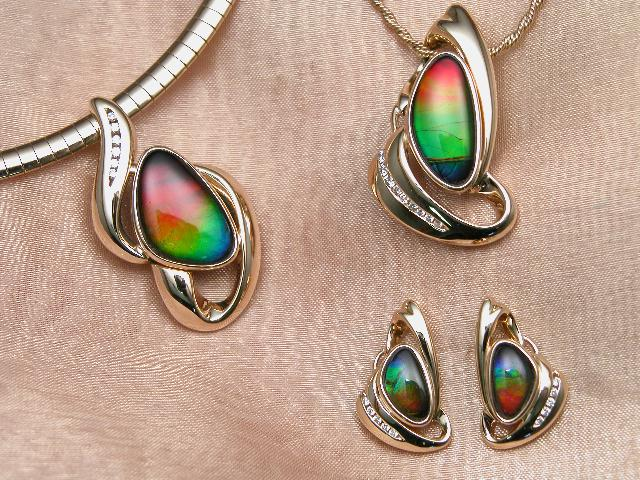
Ammolite jewelry by Korite. The ammolite gems are triplets, as evidenced by their convex profiles. Ammolite is best used in pendants, earrings, and brooches due to its fragility.

Compared to most other gems, ammolite has a rather scant history of use; it did not begin to garner interest in Western society until the 1970s after entering the market (to a limited degree) in 1969. The Blackfeet tribe know ammolite as iniskim, meaning "buffalo stone", and have long believed it to possess amuletic powers; specifically, the gem is believed to aid in the buffalo hunt, and to draw the buffalo within tracking distance. The Blackfeet also believe ammolite to possess healing powers and incorporate the gem into their medicine bundles for use in ceremonies.

In the late 1990s, practitioners of feng shui began to promote ammolite as an "influential" stone with what they believe is the power to enhance well-being and detoxify the body by improving its flow of energy or "chi". Named the "seven color prosperity stone", each color is believed by feng shui practitioners to influence the wearer in different and positive ways; a combination of ruby red, emerald green, and amber yellow is most sought after for this purpose, the colors being said to enhance growth, wisdom, and wealth, respectively.

Ammolite is usually fashioned into freeform cabochons and mounted in gold, with diamonds as accents. Due to its delicacy, ammolite is best reserved for use in pendants, earrings, and brooches; if used as a ring stone, ammolite should be given a hard protective cap, namely one of synthetic spinel as used in triplets. Whole polished ammonites of appropriately small size may also be mounted in jewelry. Nothing harsher than mild soap and warm water should be used to clean ammolite jewelry; ultrasonic cleaning should be avoided.

Japan is the largest market for ammolite; this may be due to its use as an imitation of increasingly scarce black opal, or its aforementioned use in feng shui. Secondary markets include Canada, where it is used both by artisans and fine jewelry producers who sell their creations to tourists of Banff National Park and Jasper National Park. It is also crafted in the Southwest United States, where it is used by Zuni and other Native American craftspeople.
