= Callihoplites =

Callihoplites Temporal range: Late Albian

Scientific classification
- Kingdom: Animalia
- Phylum: Mollusca
- Class: Cephalopoda
- Subclass: †Ammonoidea
- Order: †Ammonitida
- Family: †Hoplitidae
- Subfamily: †Hoplitinae
- Genus: †Callihoplites; Spath, 1925

Genus of molluscs (fossil)

Callihoplites is a genus of rather evolute ammonites from the Lower Cretaceous, Late Albian. Its whorl section squarish or compressed, inner whorls bearing umbilical bullae and ventrolateral clavi, with or without looped ribs between. The body chamber is smooth with a rounded venter.

Callihoplites is a member of the ammonitid family Hoplitidae and superfamily Hoplitoidea, now also known as the Hoplitoidea.
