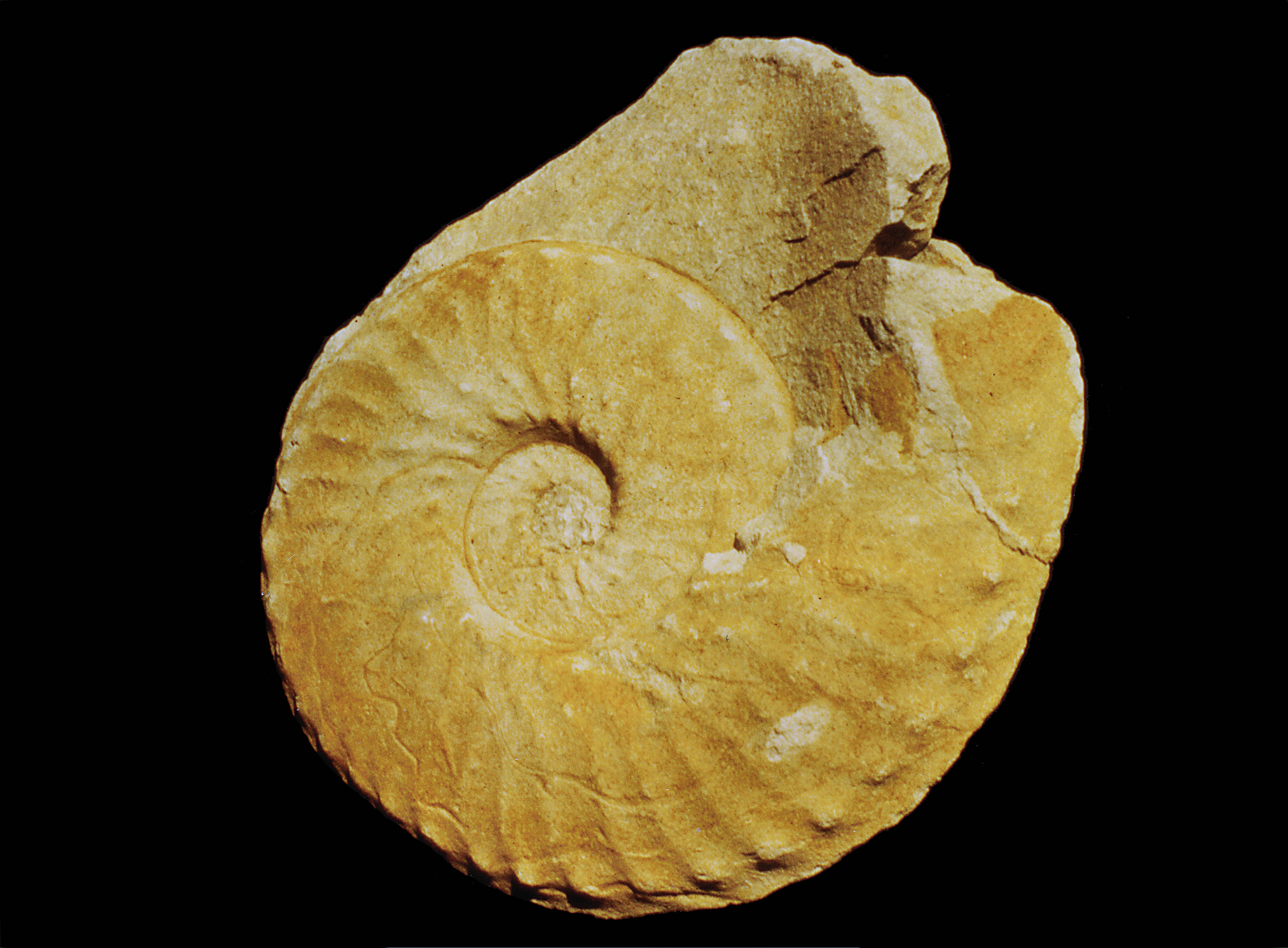
- Schloenbachia varians

Scientific classification
- Kingdom: Animalia
- Phylum: Mollusca
- Class: Cephalopoda
- Subclass: †Ammonoidea
- Order: †Ammonitida
- Family: †Schloenbachiidae
- Genus: †Schloenbachia; Neumayer, 1875

Species
- See text

= Schloenbachia =

Schloenbachia Temporal range: Upper Cret (Cenom)

Genus of molluscs (fossil)

Schloenbachia is a genus of ammonoid cephalopods from the Cenomanian stage of the Upper Cretaceous, and type for the Schloenbachiidae, a family within the ammonitid Hoplitoidea.

Schloenbachia was named by Newmayer, 1875, the type species is Schloenbachia varians (Sowerby 1817). The genus has been found in Europe (France, Germany, England), the Middle East (Iran), and North America (California, Oregon).

== Species ==
=== Schloenbachia varians ===
Schloenbachia varians, known from Europe and Iran, is a highly varied species with a number of possible synonyms. Variations include S. varians (var) subvarinas, S.v. (var) subtuberculata, S.v. (var) ventricosa, and S.v. (var) varians.

Schloenbachia varians comprises a highly variable group of medium-sized, involute and compressed to evolute and highly inflated, weak to strongly keeled ammonites, most all of which bear umbilical and lower lateral tubercles. Compressed forms may be smooth and constricted. More inflated forms usually have flexuous ribs that arise from lower lateral tubercles ending in strong clavi at the ventrolateral ends. The variations included cannot be regarded as geographic subspecies or successive chrono-subspecies, but reflect a high degree of variability in shell form and ornament (phenotypic plasticity) in S. varians.

=== Schloenbachia in western North America ===
A suite of species attributed to Schloenbachia have been described from Upper Cretaceous sediments in California and Oregon (Chico Formation and equivalents), including among others Schloenbachia chicoensis, S. knighteni, S. multicostata, S. oregonensis, and S. siskiyouensis. These differ in the nature of the ribbing, tuberculation, and keel as well as the degree of compression or inflation of the shell. Most come from northern California and Oregon, however two species Schloenbachia knighteni and Schloenbachia siskiyouensis have been found in the coastal mountains in southern California east of Santa Anna.
