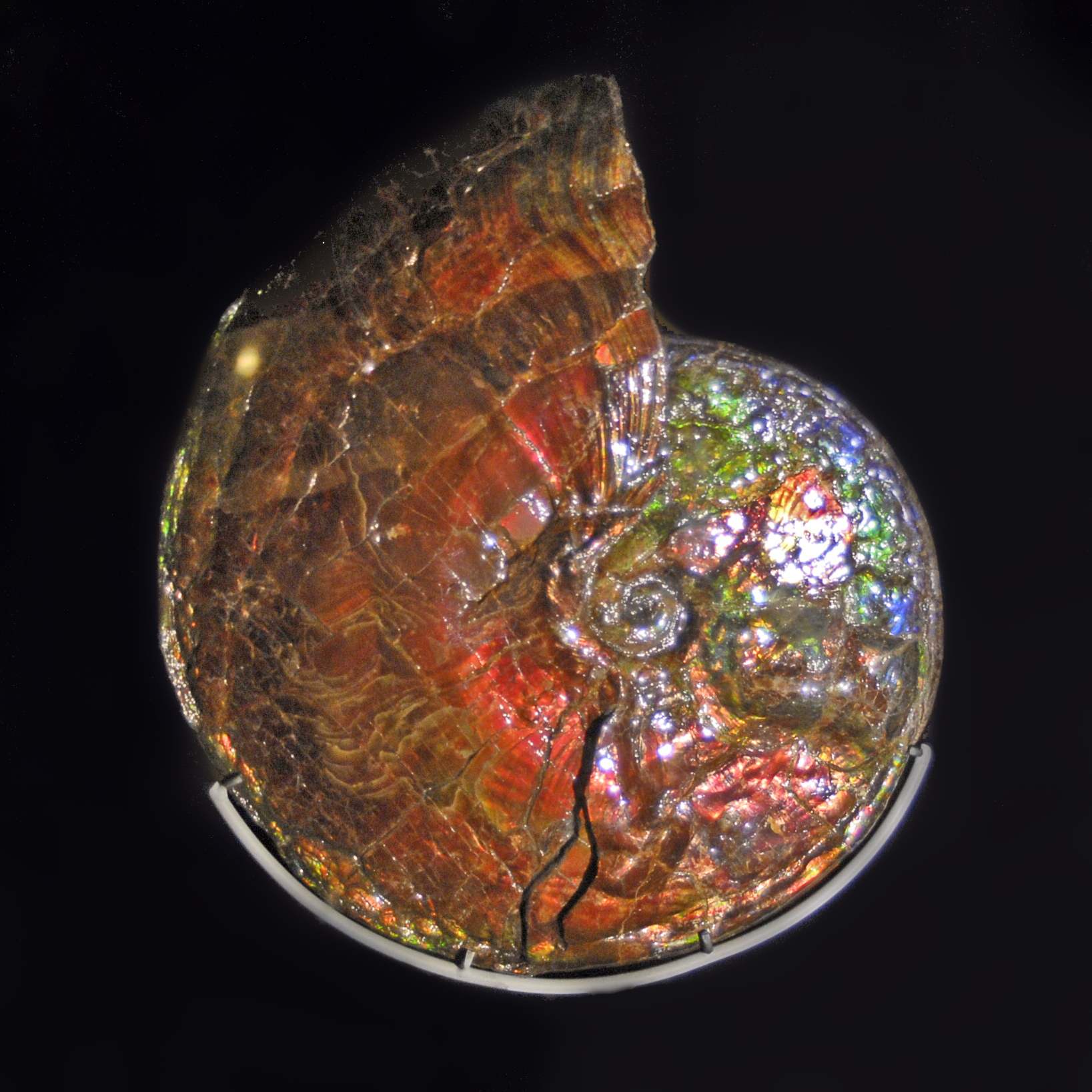
- Fossil shell of Placenticeras meeki on display at the Museo Civico di Storia Naturale di Milano

Scientific classification
- Kingdom: Animalia
- Phylum: Mollusca
- Class: Cephalopoda
- Subclass: †Ammonoidea
- Order: †Ammonitida
- Family: †Placenticeratidae
- Genus: †Placenticeras
- Species: †P. meeki

Binomial name
- †Placenticeras meeki (Böhm, 1898)

= Placenticeras meeki =

Placenticeras meeki Temporal range: Late Cretaceous

Species of mollusc (fossil)

Placenticeras meeki is an ammonite species from the Late Cretaceous. These cephalopods were fast-moving nektonic carnivores. They mainly lived in the American Interior Basin (Western Interior Seaway).

== Description ==
Shells of this species could reach a diameter of about 20 to 50 centimetres (7.9 to 19.7 in), although largest specimen could reach 1 metre (3 ft 3 in). They are discoidal, involute and compressed. Whorls are stout and rounded to diameter of 3 millimeters. The surface of fossils is usually covered by opalized nacre (ammolite).

== Etymology ==
The name honours American Palaeontologist Fielding Bradford Meek.
