= Schloenbachiidae =

Scientific classification
- Kingdom: Animalia
- Phylum: Mollusca
- Class: Cephalopoda
- Subclass: †Ammonoidea
- Order: †Ammonitida
- Superfamily: †Hoplitoidea
- Family: †Schloenbachiidae; Parona & Bonarelli, 1897

Family of molluscs (fossil)

Shloenbachiidae is a family of hoplitoid ammonoid cephalopds mostly from the lower Upper Cretaceous, (U Albian - Cenomanian).

Shloenbachiidae can be recognized by their usually keel bearing, irregularly ribbed and tuberculate shells that vary from evolute to rather involute and compressed to inflated. Tubercles are concentrated on the umbilical and ventrolateral shoulders.

The suture, similar in all members, is ammonitic; raggedy with spikey subdivided lobes and irregularly subdivided saddles.

The Schloenbachiidae first appeared near the end of the Albian, beginning with Schloenbachia, derived from the hoplitid genus Pleurohoplites or perhaps Lepthoplites, just before the beginning of the Late Cretaceous.
