= Aioloceras =

Aioloceras Temporal range: Albian
- Fossil specimens at the Hong Kong Science Museum

Scientific classification
- Kingdom: Animalia
- Phylum: Mollusca
- Class: Cephalopoda
- Subclass: †Ammonoidea
- Order: †Ammonitida
- Family: †Hoplitidae
- Genus: †Aioloceras; Whitehouse, 1936

Genus of molluscs (fossil)

Aioloceras is an ammonite, order Ammonitida, from near the end of the Early Cretaceous. The shell is compressed with the outer whorl covering much of the previous. Sides are slightly convex, converge toward a narrowly ached venter. Inner whorls have sharp falcoid ribs, outer are smooth. Umbilical tubercles are lacking. Similar related forms include Neosaynella and Cleoniceras.

Aioloceras has been found in Albian (uL Cret) sediments in Madagascar, Patagonia, and possibly Queensland.
