= Karamaiceras =

Karamaiceras Temporal range: Albian

Scientific classification
- Kingdom: Animalia
- Phylum: Mollusca
- Class: Cephalopoda
- Subclass: †Ammonoidea
- Order: †Ammonitida
- Family: †Placenticeratidae
- Genus: †Karamaiceras; Sokolov, 1967

Genus of molluscs (fossil)

Karamaiceras is an extinct cephalopod genus belonging to the Ammonoidea that lived during the Early Cretaceous. Its shell is involute, smooth and rather compressed, with the outer whorl strongly embracing the inner whorls. Sides are flattish to slightly convex and slope inwardly toward a narrowly rounded venter.
