= Proplacenticeras =

Proplacenticeras Temporal range: Late Cretaceous

Scientific classification
- Kingdom: Animalia
- Phylum: Mollusca
- Class: Cephalopoda
- Subclass: †Ammonoidea
- Order: †Ammonitida
- Family: †Placenticeratidae
- Genus: †Proplacenticeras; Spath, 1926

Genus of molluscs (fossil)

Proplacenticeras is a discoidal ammonite from the lower part of the Upper Cretaceous and precursor of the overall similar Placenticeras.

The shell is compressed, with flat or slightly convex sides and narrow flat venter, with or without slightly conical umbilical tubercles, ventrolateral clavi and crescentic ribs on outer part of sides. Sutures are with fewer auxiliary elements than on latter Placenticeras.

Species in sequential order, starting with the oldest, include P. sutherlandbrowni, P. stantoni, P. pseudoplacenta, P. fritschi and P. kaffrarium; sometimes identified as Placenticeras.

Proplacenticeras has a fairly wide distribution and is known from the western United States and Canada, Mexico, France, Spain, Angola, Israel, Madagascar, India and NE Central Asia.
