= Otohoplites =

Otohoplites Temporal range: Albian

Scientific classification
- Kingdom: Animalia
- Phylum: Mollusca
- Class: Cephalopoda
- Subclass: †Ammonoidea
- Order: †Ammonitida
- Family: †Hoplitidae
- Subfamily: †Hoplitinae
- Genus: †Otohoplites; Steinmann, 1925

Type species
- Ammonites raulinianus (d'Orbigny, 1841)

Genus of molluscs (fossil)

Otohoplites is a genus of ammonite that lived in the Early Albian age and whose fossils were found in Svalbard, Denmark, England, France, Austria, Poland, Russia and Kazakhstan. It has evolved from Hemisonneratia and gave rise to the genus Hoplites. Shells belonging to this genera are rather inflated to compressed and have zigzagging, or looped ribs that end in oblique ventrolateral clavi. Usually, ribs are zigzagging through venter. Macroconchs have a smooth body chamber and rounded venter.

== Species ==
Currently, there is confusion as to the systematics of this genus and some species may be morphological variants of others. These are some of the species belonging to Otohoplites:

- O. auritiformis Spath, 1925 (O. sinzowi Saveliev, 1973 is a junior synonym)
- O. bulliensis Destombes, 1973
- O. destombesi Casey, 1965
- O. elegans Spath, 1925
- O. glyphus Casey, 1965
- O. guersanti (d'Orbigny, 1841)
- O. icarus Casey, 1965
- O. involutus Casey, 1965
- O. maxinae Casey, 1980
- O. normanniae Destombes, Juignet & Rioult, 1974
- O. waltoni Casey, 1965 (O. larcheri Destombes, 1979 is a junior synonym)
- O. oweni Casey, 1965
- O. polygonalis Casey, 1965
- O. raulinianus (d'Orbigny, 1841)
- O. simplex Casey, 1965
- O. subchloris Casey, 1965
- O. subguersanti Casey, 1965
- O. subhilli Spath, 1942 (O. venustus Saveliev, 1973 is a junior synonym)
