= Korite =

Korite is the largest commercial producer of ammolite. The company produces natural ammolite gemstones and jewelry. Korite is based in Calgary, Alberta, Canada. The firm's sister company, Canada Fossils Ltd., provides it with ammonites and other fossils. It is a member of the American Gem Trade Association.

On September 27, 2007, an ammonite fossil 80 million years old and 60 cm (two ft) in diameter of ammonite made its debut at the American Museum of Natural History in New York. Neil Landman, curator, said that it became extinct 66 million years ago, at the time of the dinosaurs. Korite donated it after its discovery in Alberta.

Korite received creditor protection on June 30, 2020. The company reported losses of C$2.4 million in anticipated sales due to the cancellation of trade shows because of the 2019–20 Hong Kong protests, and a further $6.1 million loss of anticipated sales due to the impacts of the COVID-19 pandemic.
