= Gastrohoplites =

Gastrohoplites Temporal range: L Cretaceous (M Albian)

Scientific classification
- Kingdom: Animalia
- Phylum: Mollusca
- Class: Cephalopoda
- Subclass: †Ammonoidea
- Order: †Ammonitida
- Family: †Hoplitidae
- Genus: †Gastrohoplites; McLearn, 1930

Genus of molluscs (fossil)

Gastrohoplites is a genus of hoplitid ammonites included in the Gastrohoplinae from Middle Albian age marine strata in western North America and parts of Europe.

The shell of Gastrohoplites is variably involute to evolute. Sides and venter are flat, shoulders sharp. Ribs more or less prominent, coarse, branch from above the umbilical border, and strengthen with age. Saddles in the suture are broad and rather simple.
