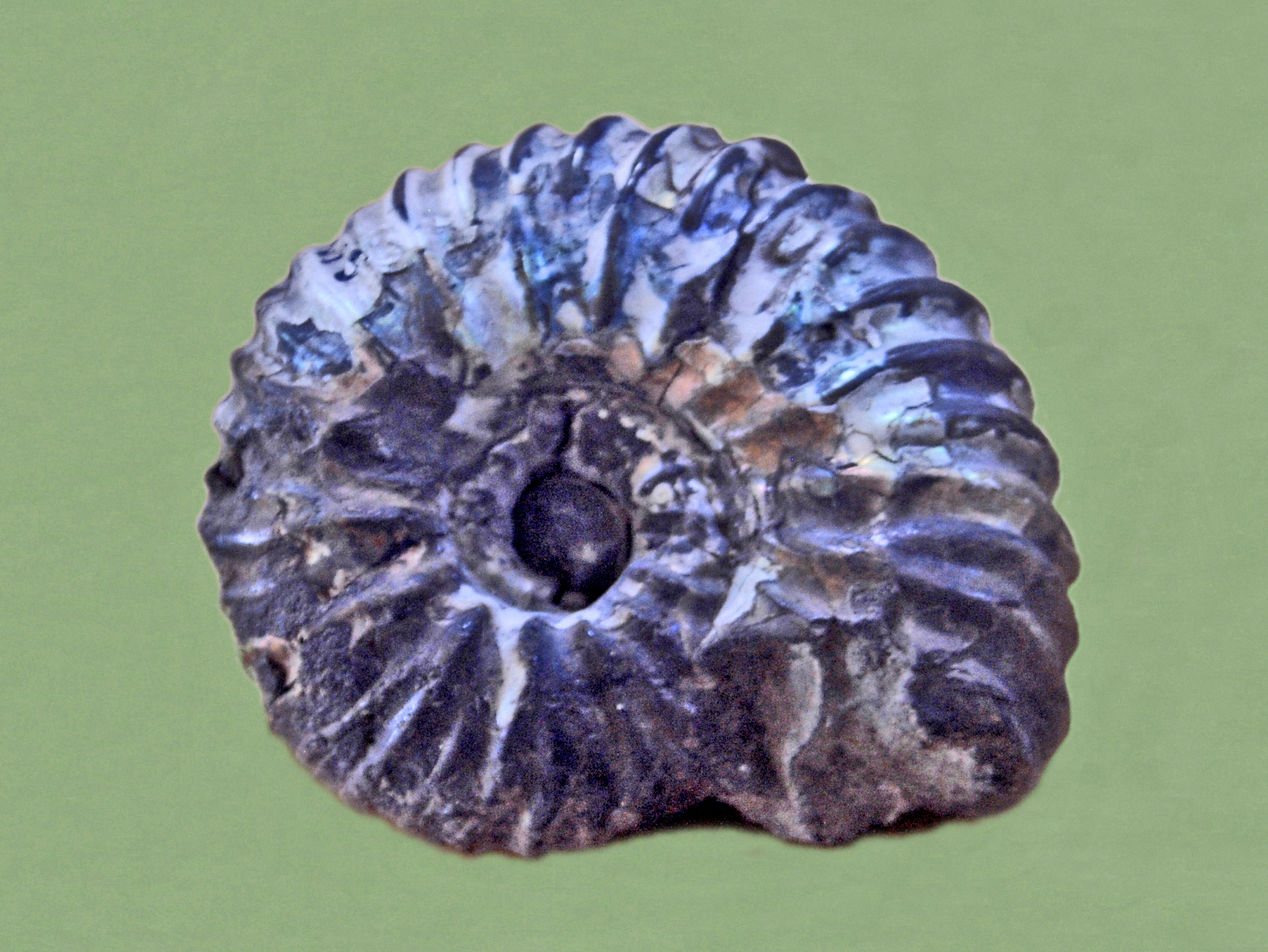
- Fossil of Sonneratia dutempleana from France, on display at Galerie de paléontologie et d'anatomie comparée in Paris

Scientific classification
- Kingdom: Animalia
- Phylum: Mollusca
- Class: Cephalopoda
- Subclass: †Ammonoidea
- Order: †Ammonitida
- Family: †Hoplitidae
- Subfamily: †Sonneratiinae
- Genus: †Sonneratia; Bayle, 1878

= Sonneratia (ammonite) =

Sonneratia Temporal range: Cretaceous, 125.45–109.0 Ma

Genus of molluscs (fossil)

Sonneratia is an extinct genus of Cretaceous ammonites included in the family Hoplitidae. These fast-moving nektonic carnivores lived in the Cretaceous period, Aptian - Albian age.

== Species ==
- Sonneratia dutempleana (Orbigny, 1850)
- Sonneratia kitchini Spath, 1925
- Sonneratia rotator Casey, 1965

== Distribution ==
Fossils of species within this genus have been found in the Cretaceous sediments of Canada, Denmark, France, Madagascar, United Kingdom and United States.
