= Arcthoplites =

Arcthoplites Temporal range: Albian

Scientific classification
- Kingdom: Animalia
- Phylum: Mollusca
- Class: Cephalopoda
- Subclass: †Ammonoidea
- Order: †Ammonitida
- Family: †Hoplitidae
- Subfamily: †Gastroplitinae
- Genus: †Arcthoplites; Spath, 1925

Genus of molluscs (fossil)

Arcthoplites is an extinct genus of cephalopod belonging to the ammonite subclass.
