= Pleurohoplites =

Pleurohoplites Temporal range: Middle Cretaceous

Scientific classification
- Kingdom: Animalia
- Phylum: Mollusca
- Class: Cephalopoda
- Subclass: †Ammonoidea
- Order: †Ammonitida
- Family: †Hoplitidae
- Subfamily: †Hoplitinae
- Genus: †Pleurohoplites; Spath, 1921

Genus of ammonitids

Pleurohoplites is a genus in the ammonitid family Hoplitidae, found in middle Cretaceous (Upper Albian - Cenomanian) of Europe, and included in the subfamily Hoplitinae.

Pleurohoplites has a somewhat involute, compressed to rather inflated shell, with a rounded to subcoronate venter, that bears umbilical tubercles from which branch strong, un-looped, ribs that end in ventrolateral nodes, or are continuous to the siphonal line.
