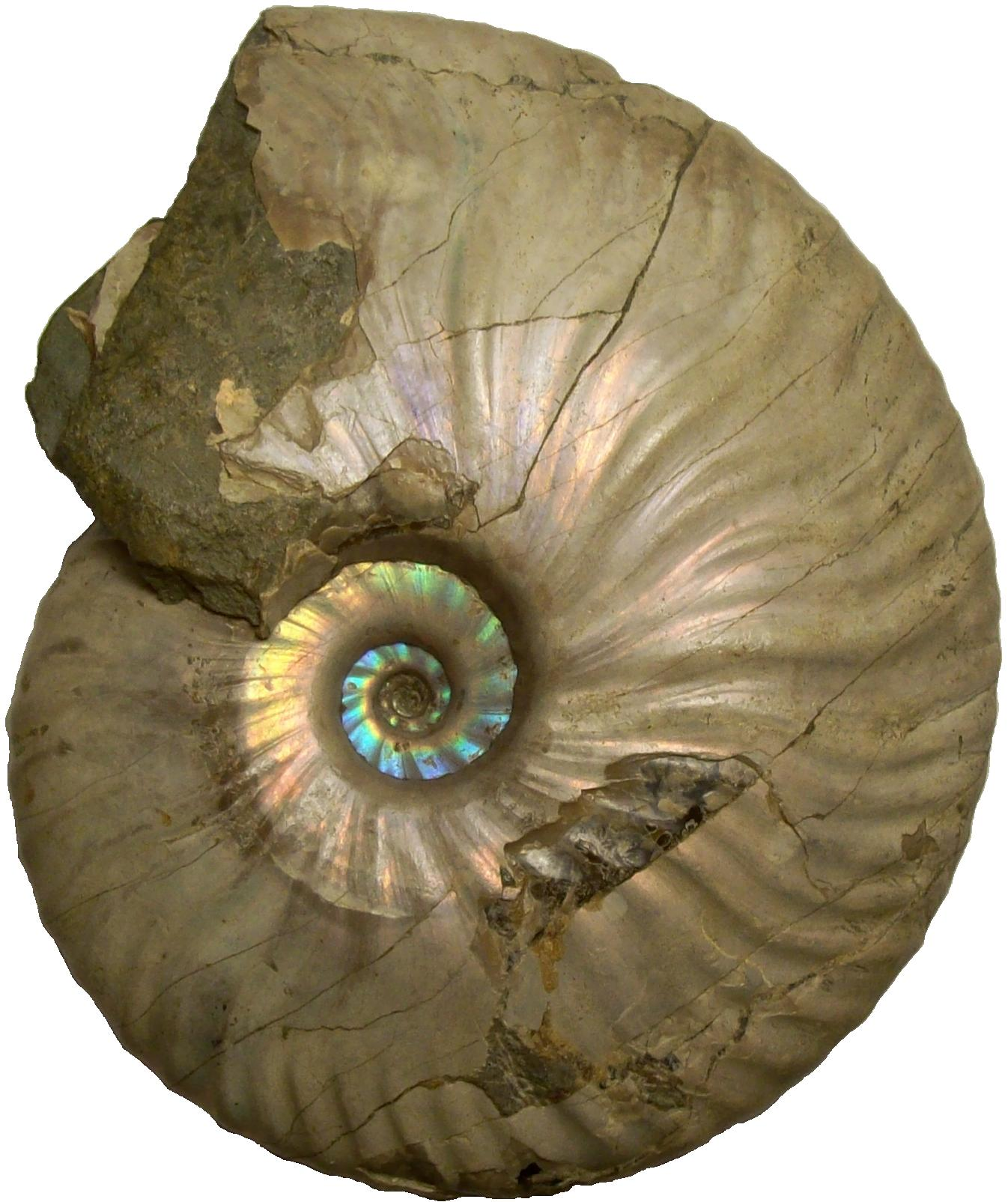
- Cleoniceras besairiei, Madagascar

Scientific classification
- Kingdom: Animalia
- Phylum: Mollusca
- Class: Cephalopoda
- Subclass: †Ammonoidea
- Order: †Ammonitida
- Family: †Hoplitidae
- Genus: †Cleoniceras; Parona & Bonnarelli 1895

= Cleoniceras =

Cleoniceras Temporal range: Cret L & M Albian

Genus of ammonites

Cleoniceras is a rather involute, high-whorled hoplitid from the Lower to basal Middle Albian of Europe, Madagascar, and the Transcaspian region. The shell has a generally small umbilicus, arched to acute venter, and typically at some growth stage, falcoid ribs that spring in pairs from umbilical tubercles, usually disappearing on the outer whorls.

Cleoniceras is included in the subfamily Cleoniceratinae.

== Species ==
This genus contains the species C. cleon and C. besairei.
