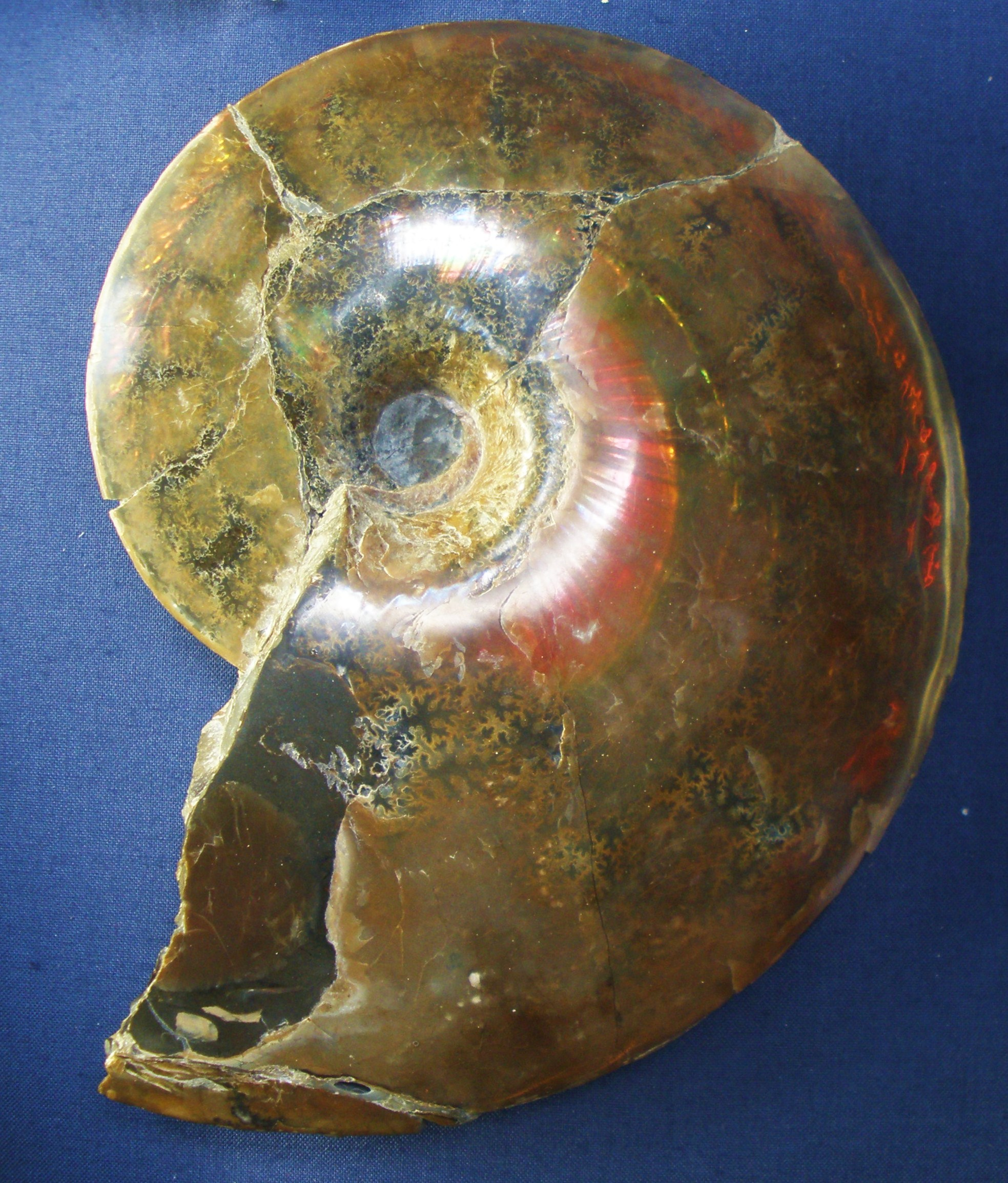
- Placenticeras meeki

Scientific classification
- Kingdom: Animalia
- Phylum: Mollusca
- Class: Cephalopoda
- Subclass: †Ammonoidea
- Order: †Ammonitida
- Family: †Placenticeratidae
- Genus: †Placenticeras; Meek, 1870

Synonyms
- Diplacmoceras

= Placenticeras =

Placenticeras Temporal range: Late Cretaceous

Genus of molluscs (fossil)

Placenticeras is a genus of ammonites from the Late Cretaceous. Its fossils have been found in Asia, Europe, North and South America.

== Taxonomy ==
Placenticeras, named by Fielding Bradford Meek, 1870, is the type genus for the Placenticeratidae, a family that is part of the Hoplitoidea, a superfamily of the Ammonitida.

== Description ==
Placenticeras has a very involute shell with slightly convex sides and a very narrow venter. Side are smooth or with faint sinuous ribs. Early whorls have umbilical tubercles that in later whorls appear higher on the sides. Earlier whorls normally have lower and fine upper ventrolateral clavi. Ornament weakens in the adult and the last whorl may be smooth. The suture is with numerous adventitious and auxiliary elements, with saddles and lobes that are much frilled.

== Species ==
The genus contains the following species:

- Placenticeras bidorsatum
- Placenticeras costatum
- Placenticeras cumminsi
- Placenticeras fritschi
- Placenticeras grossouvrei
- Placenticeras intercalare
- Placenticeras kolbajense
- Placenticeras maherndli
- Placenticeras mediasiaticum
- Placenticeras memoriaschloenbachi
- Placenticeras meeki
- Placenticeras orbignyanum
- Placenticeras paraplanum
- Placenticeras placenta
- Placenticeras polyopsis
- Placenticeras pseudoplacenta
- Placenticeras semiornatum
- Placenticeras syrtale (syn. Stantonoceras pseudocostatum)
- Placenticeras tamulicum
- Placenticeras vredenburgi
- Placenticeras whitfieldi

== Gallery ==
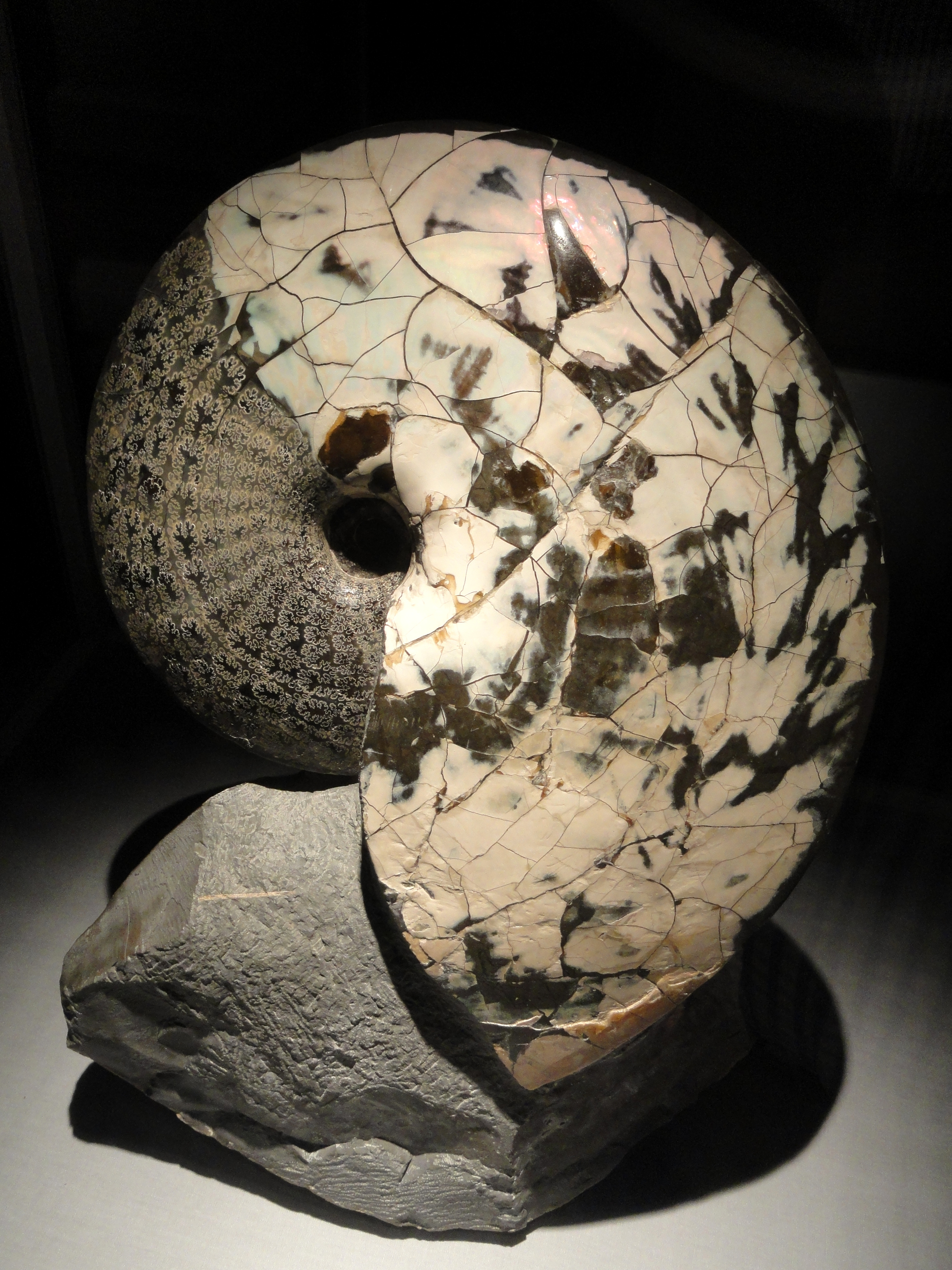
P. costatum, Pierre Shale Formation, South Dakota

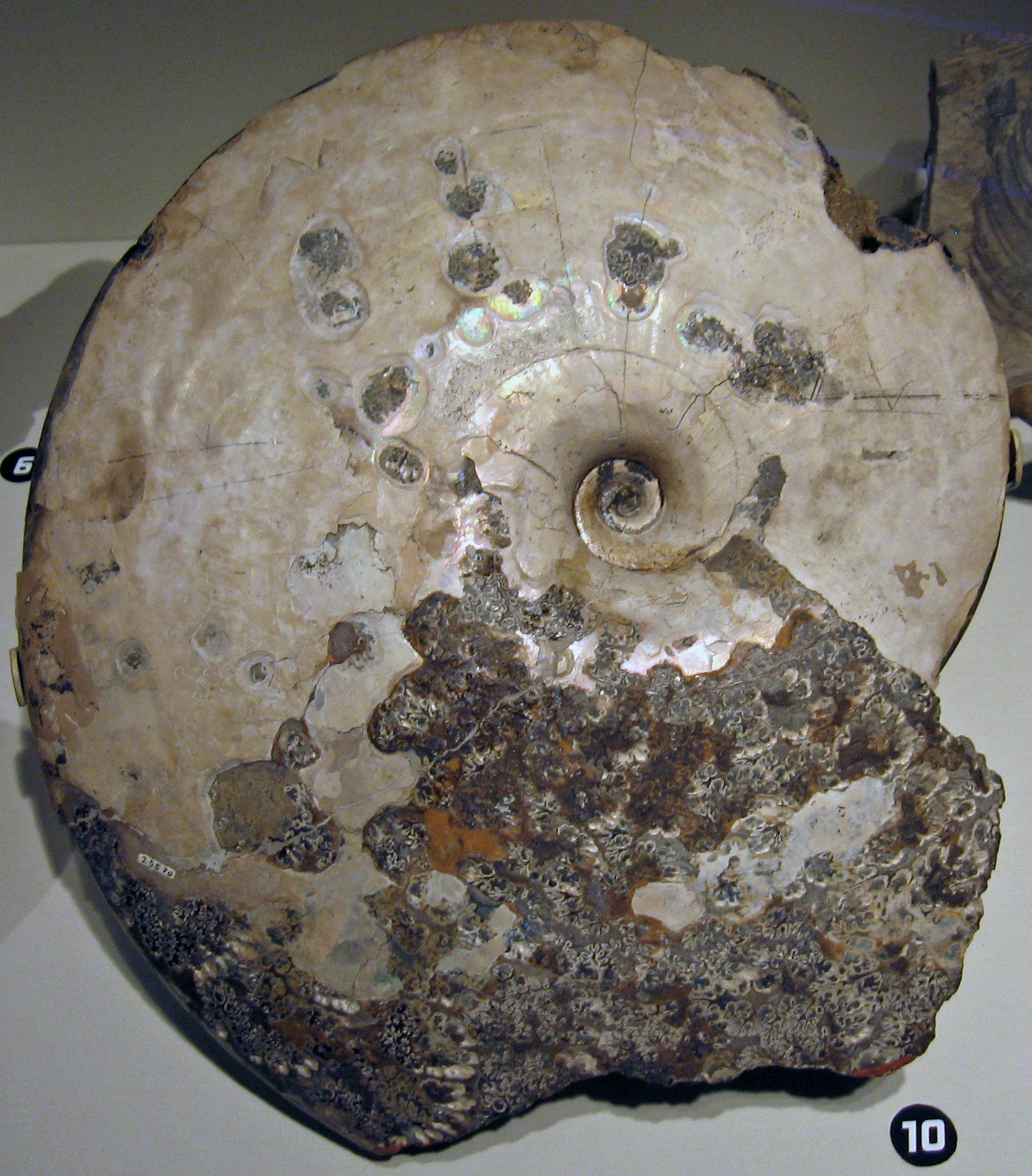
P. placenta with mosasaur bite marks

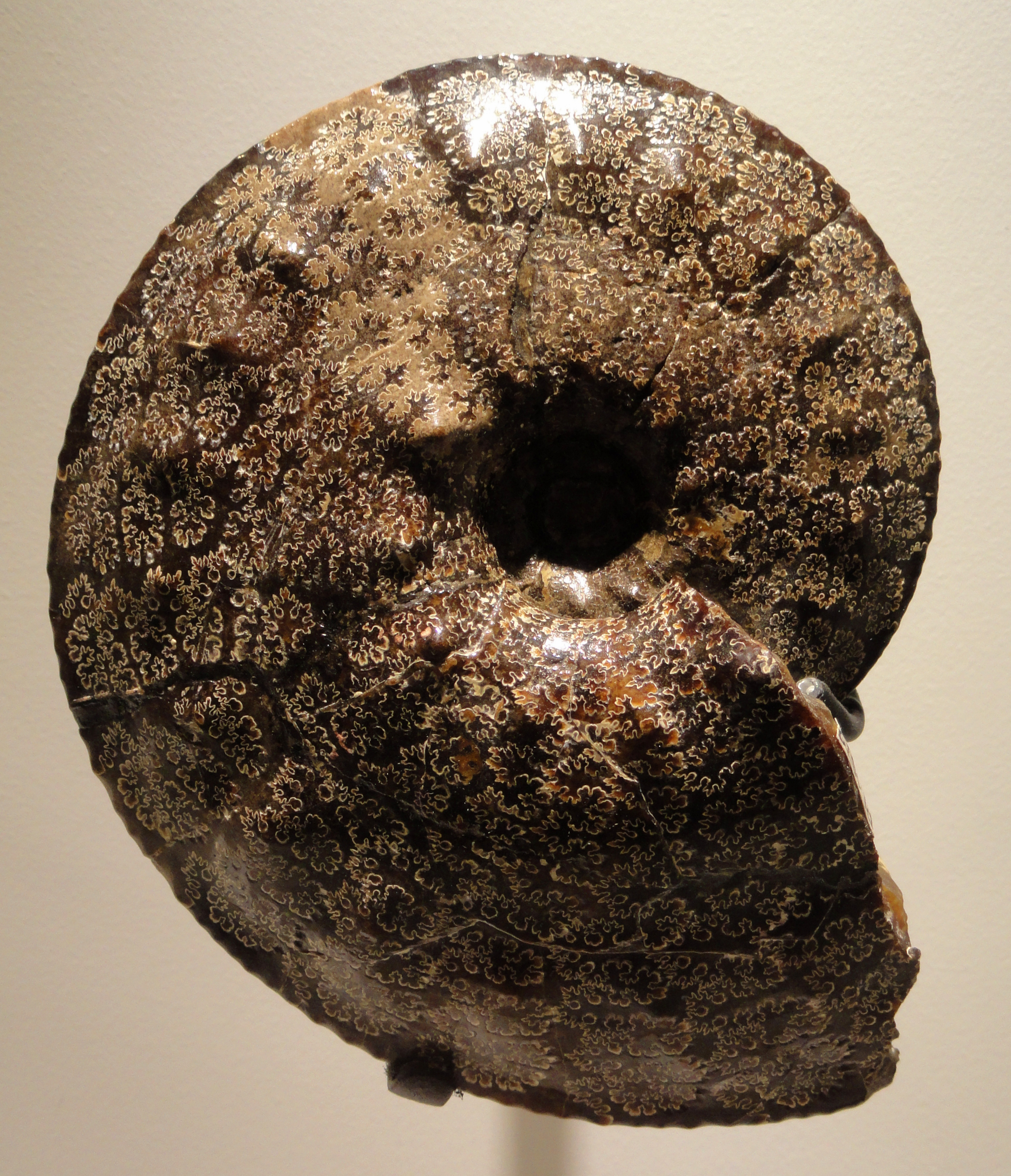
P. meeki showing sutures

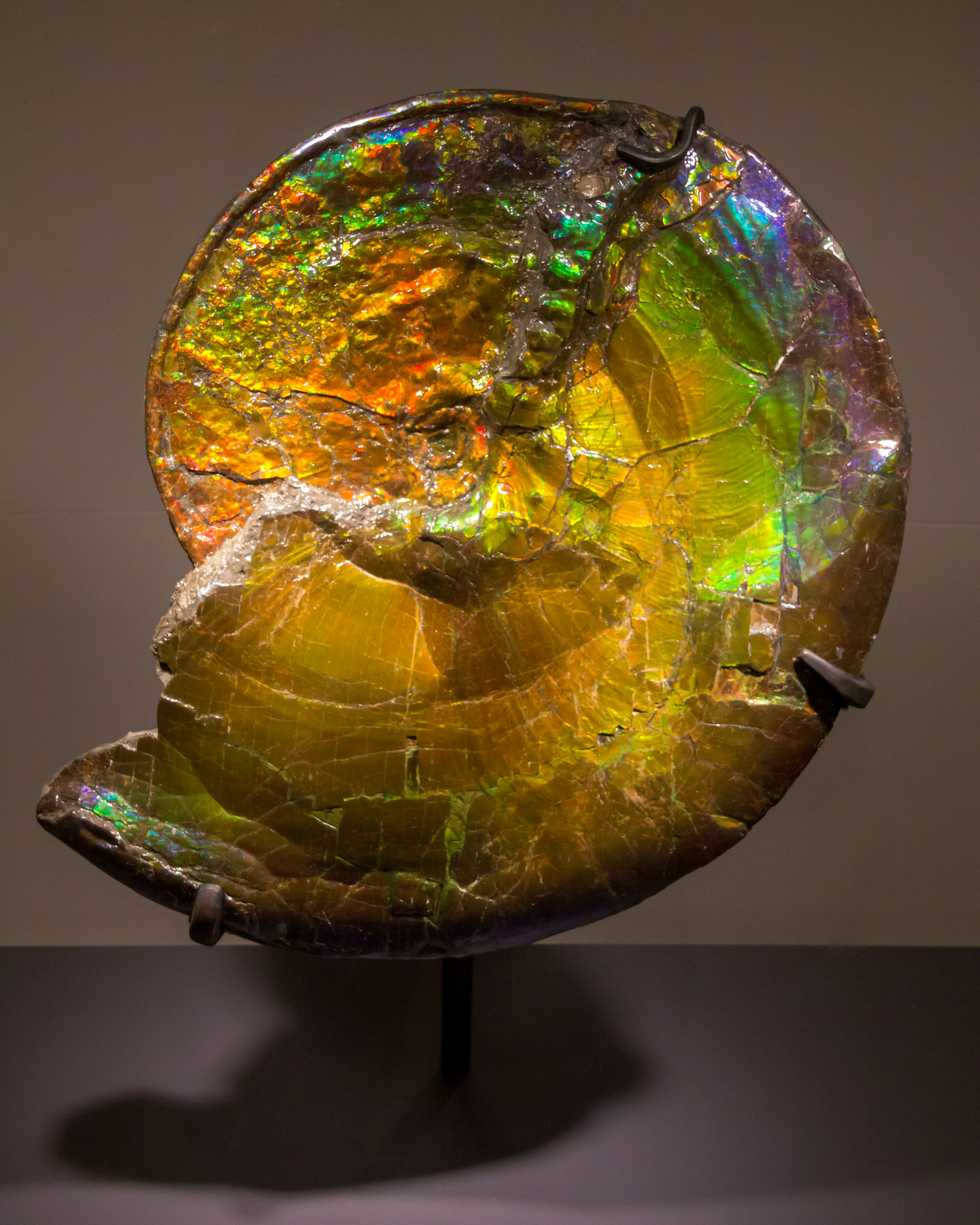
P. intercalare ammolite, Bearpaw Formation, Alberta, Canada

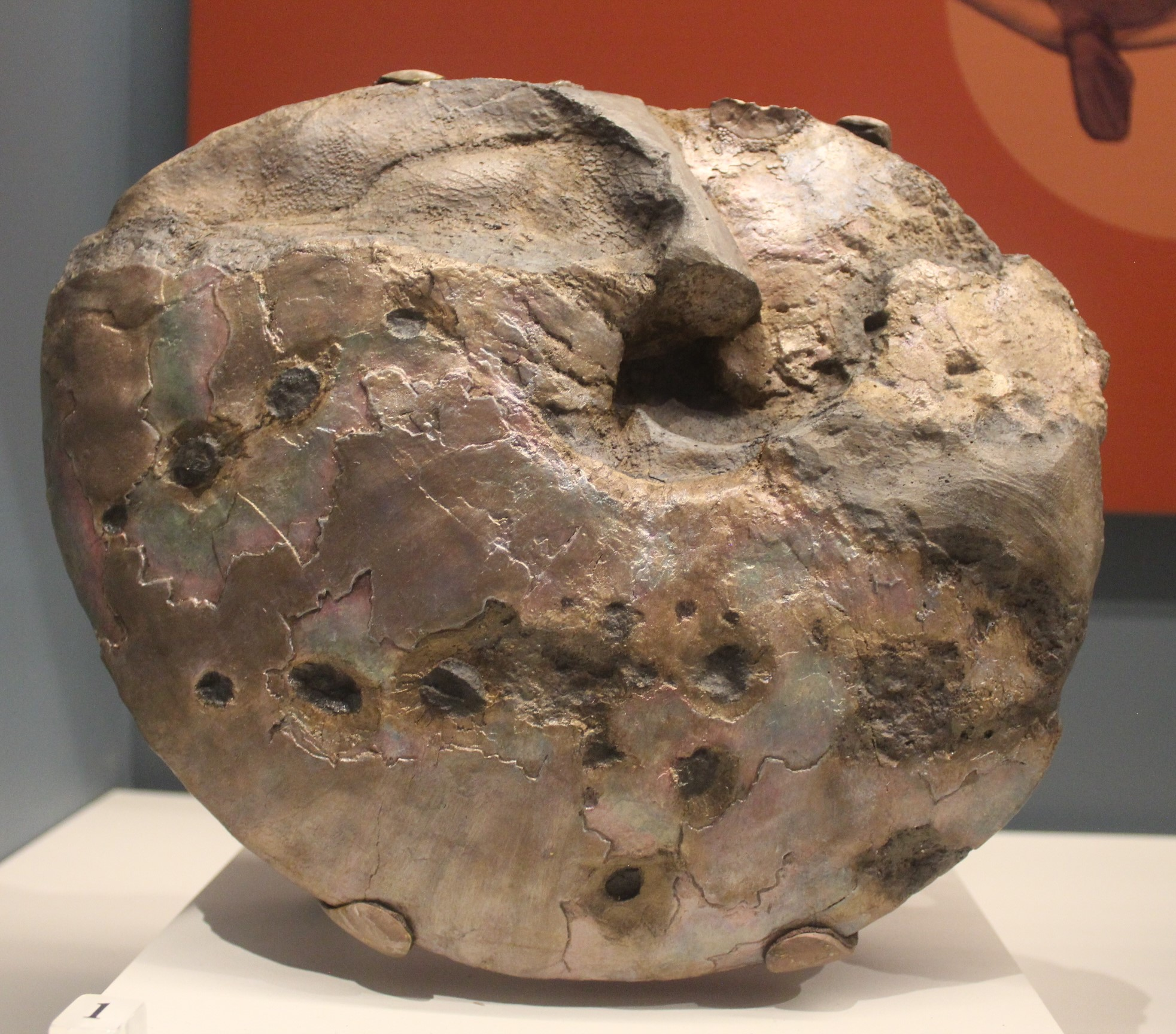
P. whitfieldi with mosasaur bite marks

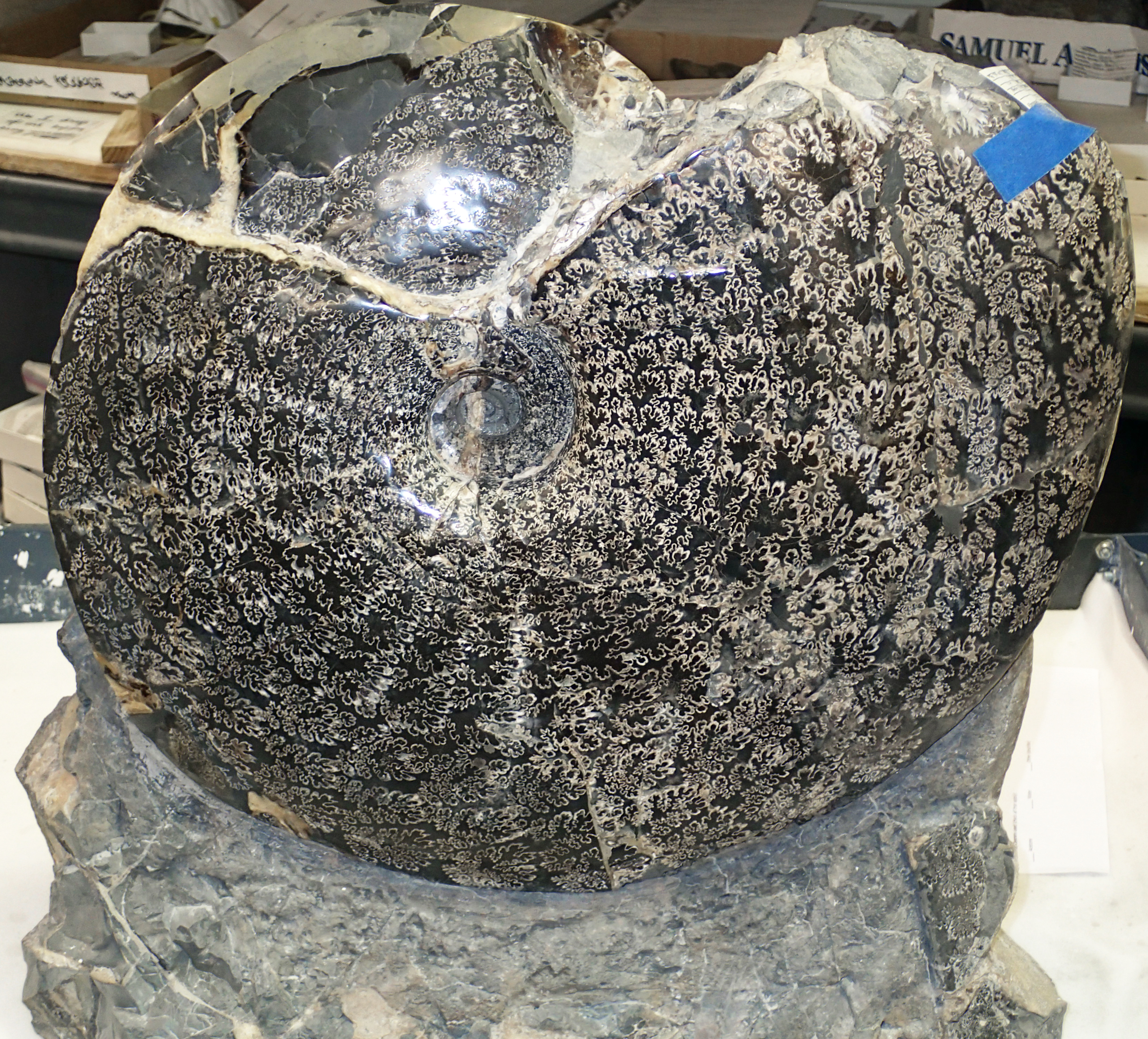
Placenticeras sp. showing sutures. Pierre Shale, Upper Cretaceous; Meade County, South Dakota (US).
