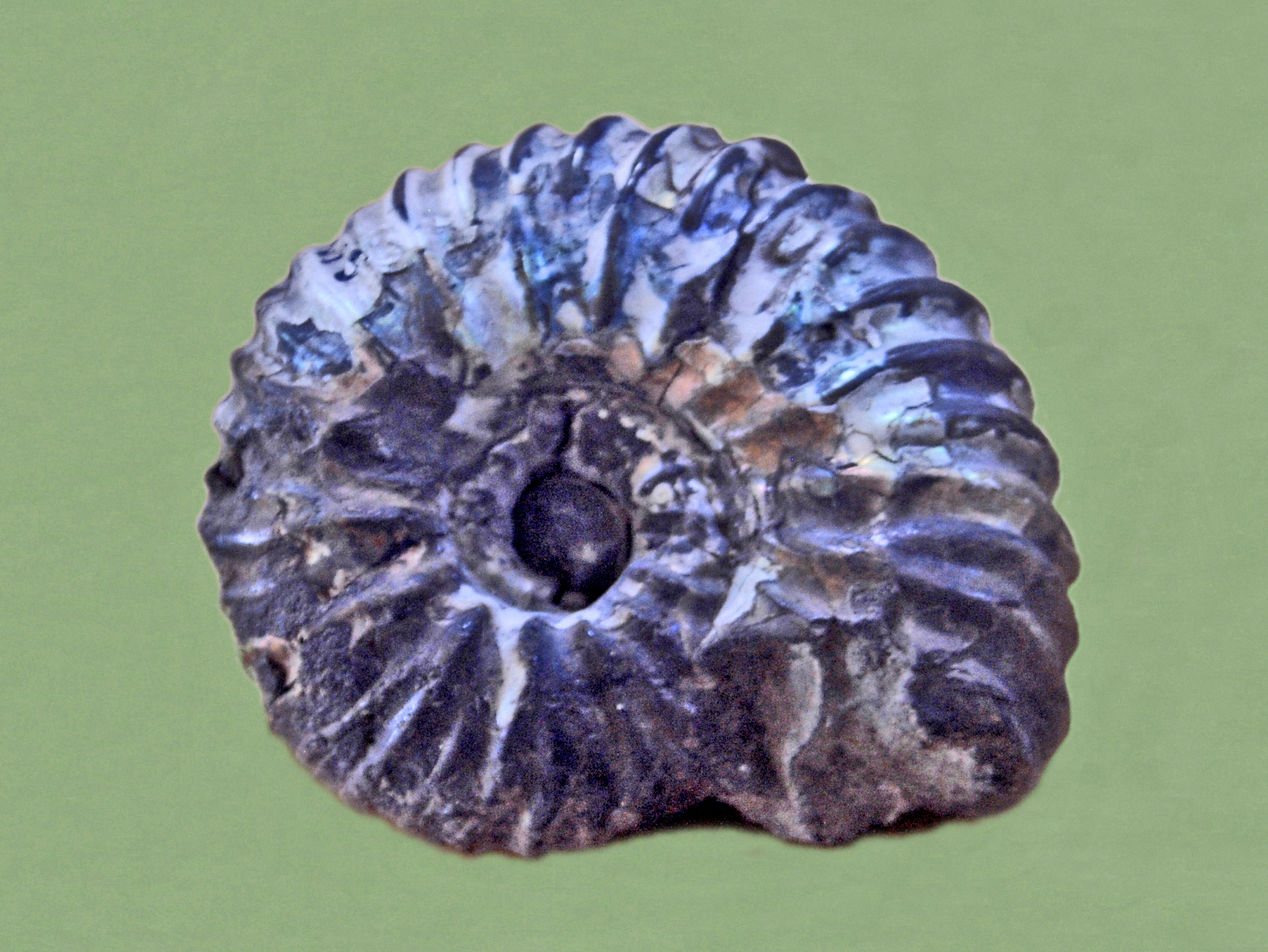
- Fossil of Sonneratia dutempleana (Hoplitidae) from France, on display at Galerie de paléontologie et d'anatomie comparée in Paris

Scientific classification
- Kingdom: Animalia
- Phylum: Mollusca
- Class: Cephalopoda
- Subclass: †Ammonoidea
- Order: †Ammonitida
- Suborder: †Ammonitina
- Superfamily: †Hoplitoidea; Douvillé, 1890

Families
- See text

= Hoplitoidea =

Hoplitoidea Temporal range: Upper Cretaceous

Extinct superfamily of ammonites

Hoplitoidea, formerly Hoplitaceae, is a superfamily of mostly Upper Cretaceous ammonites comprising families united by a similar suture pattern with multiple similar elements that tend to decrease in size going toward the umbilicus, at the inner edge of any whorl, and which are typically in a straight line. Sutural elements are commonly ammonitic, but in some saddles and in others both saddles and lobes are smooth and undivided. Shells are variable in form, both ribbed, evolute forms and smooth, involute forms are included.

Families regarded as part now include the Engonoceratidae, Hoplitidae, Placenticeratidae, and Schloenbachiidae. Some classifications however include the Forbesiceridae in place of the Engonoceratidae

The older version of the Treatise includes in addition to the five families already mentioned, the Pulchelliidae, Trochleiceratidae, Douvilleiceratidae, Deshayesitidae, and Leymeriellidae, which have since been reassigned.
