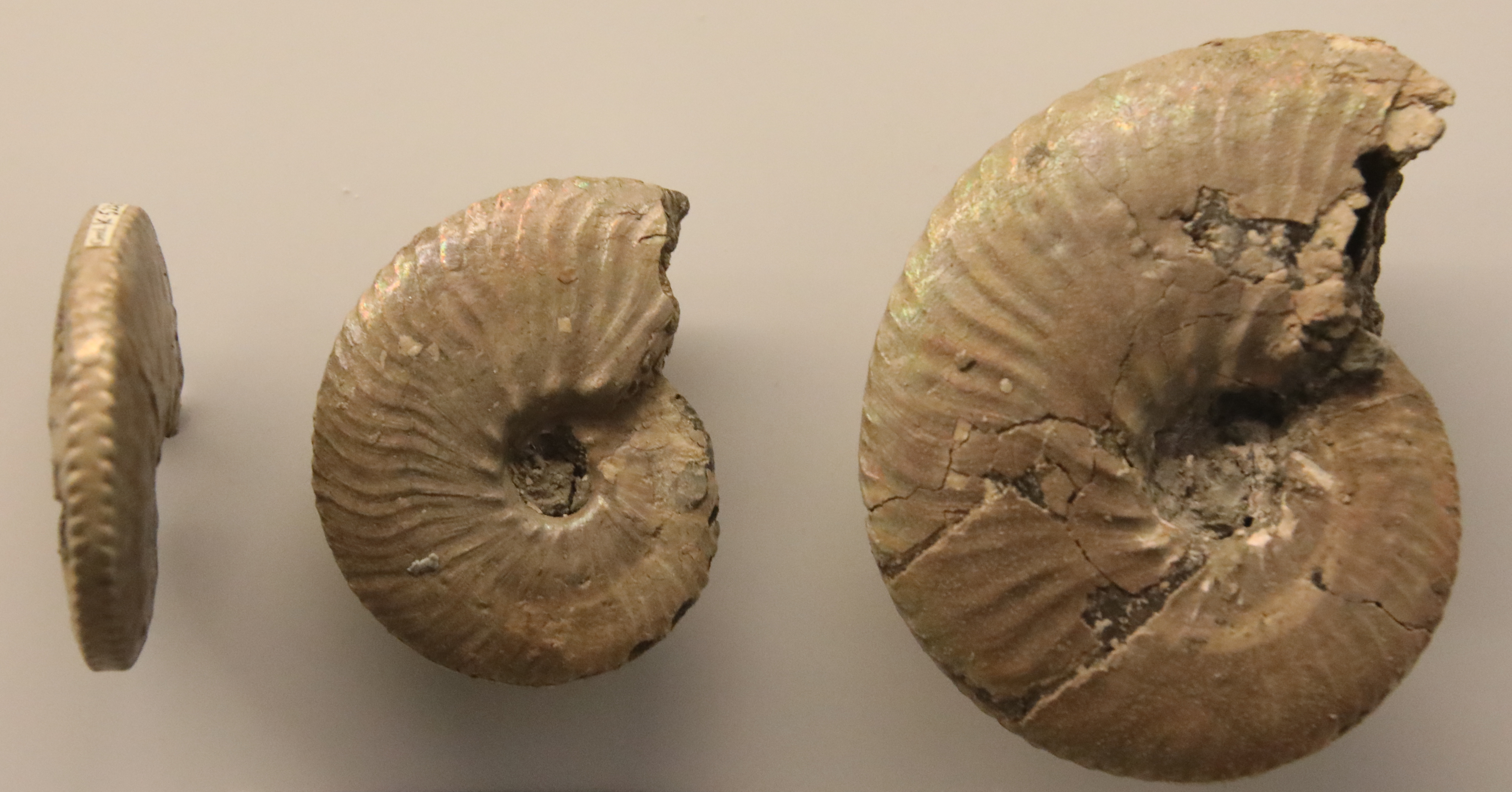
- Anahoplites splendens fossils at the Oxford University Museum of Natural History

Scientific classification
- Kingdom: Animalia
- Phylum: Mollusca
- Class: Cephalopoda
- Subclass: †Ammonoidea
- Order: †Ammonitida
- Family: †Hoplitidae
- Subfamily: †Anahoplitinae
- Genus: †Anahoplites; Hyatt, 1900

Type species
- Ammonites splendens Sowerby, 1815)

= Anahoplites =

Anahoplites Temporal range: Albian

Genus of molluscs (fossil)

Anahoplites is a genus of rather involute, compressed hoplitid ammonites with flat sides, narrow flat or grooved venters, and flexious ribs or striae arising from weak umbilicle tubercles that end in fine dense ventrolateral nodes. The elements of their sutures are short, wide and jaggedy. Specimens of Annahoplites have diameters typically in the range of 4–6 centimetres (1.6–2.4 in) although some with diameters of as much as 19 centimetres (7.5 in) have been reported. The genus lived during the Cretaceous, from the Middle to the late Albian.

Anahoplites is now included in the subfamily Anahoplitinae and separated from the Hoplitinae where it was placed in the older, 1957 edition of the Treatise on Invertebrate Paleontology, Part L (Ammonoidea). Genera of the Hoplitinae tend to be more robust, with broader whorls and stronger ribs.

Anahoplites is found in Europe, from England to the transcaspian region in western Asia.
