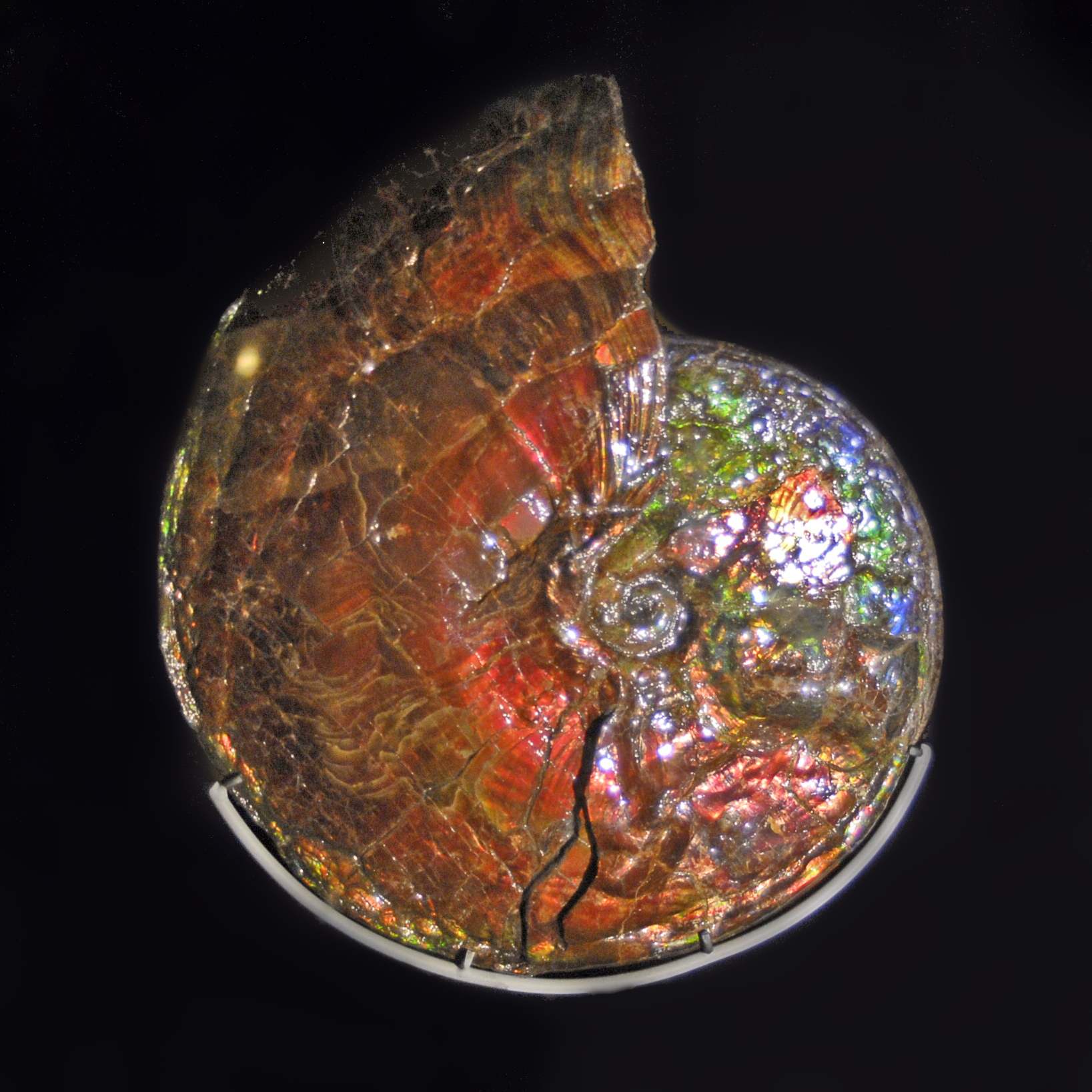
- Placenticeras meeki

Scientific classification
- Kingdom: Animalia
- Phylum: Mollusca
- Class: Cephalopoda
- Subclass: †Ammonoidea
- Order: †Ammonitida
- Superfamily: †Hoplitoidea
- Family: †Placenticeratidae; Hyatt, 1900

Genera
- Gissarites; Hengestites; Hoplitoplacenticeras; Metaplacenticeras; Placenticeras; Proplacenticeras; Rapidoplacenticeratinae; Stantonoceras

= Placenticeratidae =

Placenticeratidae Temporal range: Upper Cretaceous

Family of molluscs (fossil)

Placenticeratidae is an extinct family of mostly Late Cretaceous ammonites (cephalopod order Ammonitida) included in the superfamily Hoplitoidea, derived from the Engonoceratidae by an increase in suture complexity.

Placeticeratids are characterized by rather involute compressed shells of moderate to large size with narrow flat or grooved venters (outer rims), at least on early whorls. Most are rather smooth or weakly ornamented except for a few later forms in which the outer whorls are strongly tuberculate. The suture has numerous, including auxiliary and adventive, elements. Saddles and lobes are typically deep, narrow necked, and raggedly embayed.

The Placenticeratidae had their beginning in the Late Albian stage at the end of the Early Cretaceous, starting with Hypengonoceras. The type genus, Placenticeras, appears later and is known from the upper Santonian to the lower Campanian of the Upper Cretaceous. The family has the longest duration of the Hoplitaceae, extending well into the Maastrichtian, the final stage of the Cretaceous period with the genus Hoplitoplacenticeras.

== Sources ==
- Arkell et al., 1957. Mesozoic Ammonoidea; Treatise on Invertebrate Paleontology, Part L (Ammonoidea). Geol. Soc. of America and Univ. Kansas Press.
