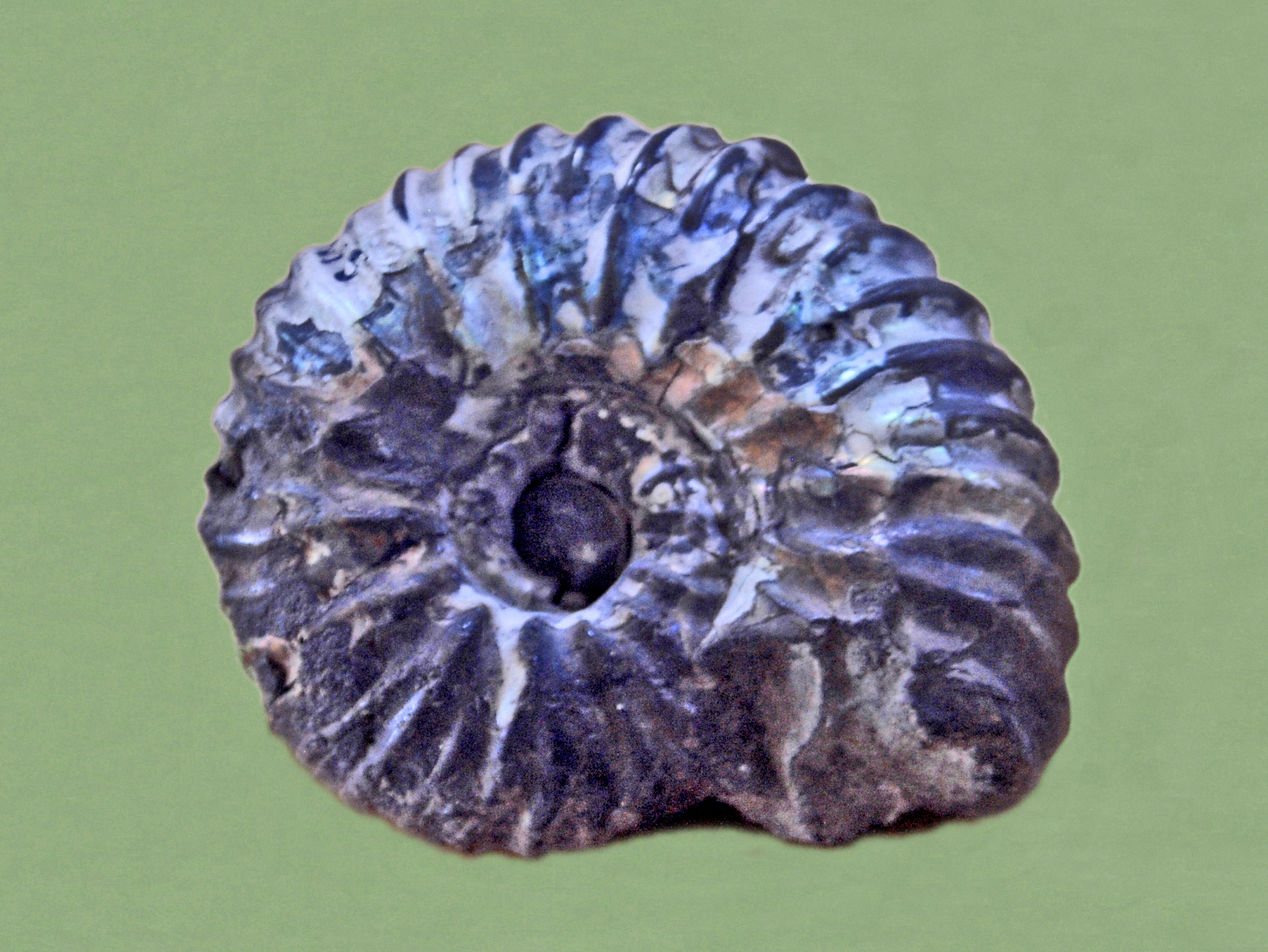
- Fossil of Sonneratia dutempleana from France, on display at Galerie de paléontologie et d'anatomie comparée in Paris

Scientific classification
- Kingdom: Animalia
- Phylum: Mollusca
- Class: Cephalopoda
- Subclass: †Ammonoidea
- Order: †Ammonitida
- Superfamily: †Hoplitoidea
- Family: †Hoplitidae; Douvillé, 1890

= Hoplitidae =

Hoplitidae Temporal range: Aptian–Cenomanian

Family of molluscs (fossil)

The Hoplitidae is a family of Cretaceous ammonites that lived during the middle of the period from the late Aptian to the Cenomanian. They are part of the superfamily Hoplitoidea.

Members of the Hoplitidae are typically evolute, with inner whorls exposed, although some are more involute, and are commonly stout and strongly ribbed, with pronounced tubercles.

The Hoplitidae are thought to be derived from the U Aptian -M Albian Uligella of the Desmoceratidae, or some related form and have been divided into three subfamilies.

== Subtaxa ==
Classification of Hoplitidae was revised multiple times during the last few decades. Currently, Hoplitidae contains 3 subfamilies:

- Gastroplitinae
  - Freboldiceras
  - Arcthoplites
  - ?Sokolovites
  - Pseudopulchellia
  - ?Gastrohoplites
  - Gastroplites
  - Irenoceras
  - Neogastroplites
  - ?Alopecoceras
- Sonneratiinae
  - Bucaillella
  - Sonneratia
  - Pseudosonneratia
  - Anahoplitoides
  - Hemisonneratia
  - Protohoplites
  - Tetrahoplites
- Hoplitinae
  - Otohoplites
  - Hoplites
    - Hoplites (Hoplites)
    - Hoplites (Isohoplites)
  - Anahoplites
  - Dimorphoplites
  - Epihoplites
    - Epihoplites (Metaclavites)
    - Epihoplites (Epihoplites)
  - Semenoviceras
  - Callihoplites
  - Pleurohoplites
    - Pleurohoplites (Pleurohoplites)
    - Pleurohoplites (Arrhaphoceras)
  - Euhoplites
  - Hyphoplites
    - Hyphoplites (Hyphoplites)
    - Hyphoplites (Discohoplites)

== Phylogenetic relations ==
The Hoplitidae may have given rise to the Schloenbachiidae and seems to be in a different branch of the Hoplitoidea from earlier families included.
