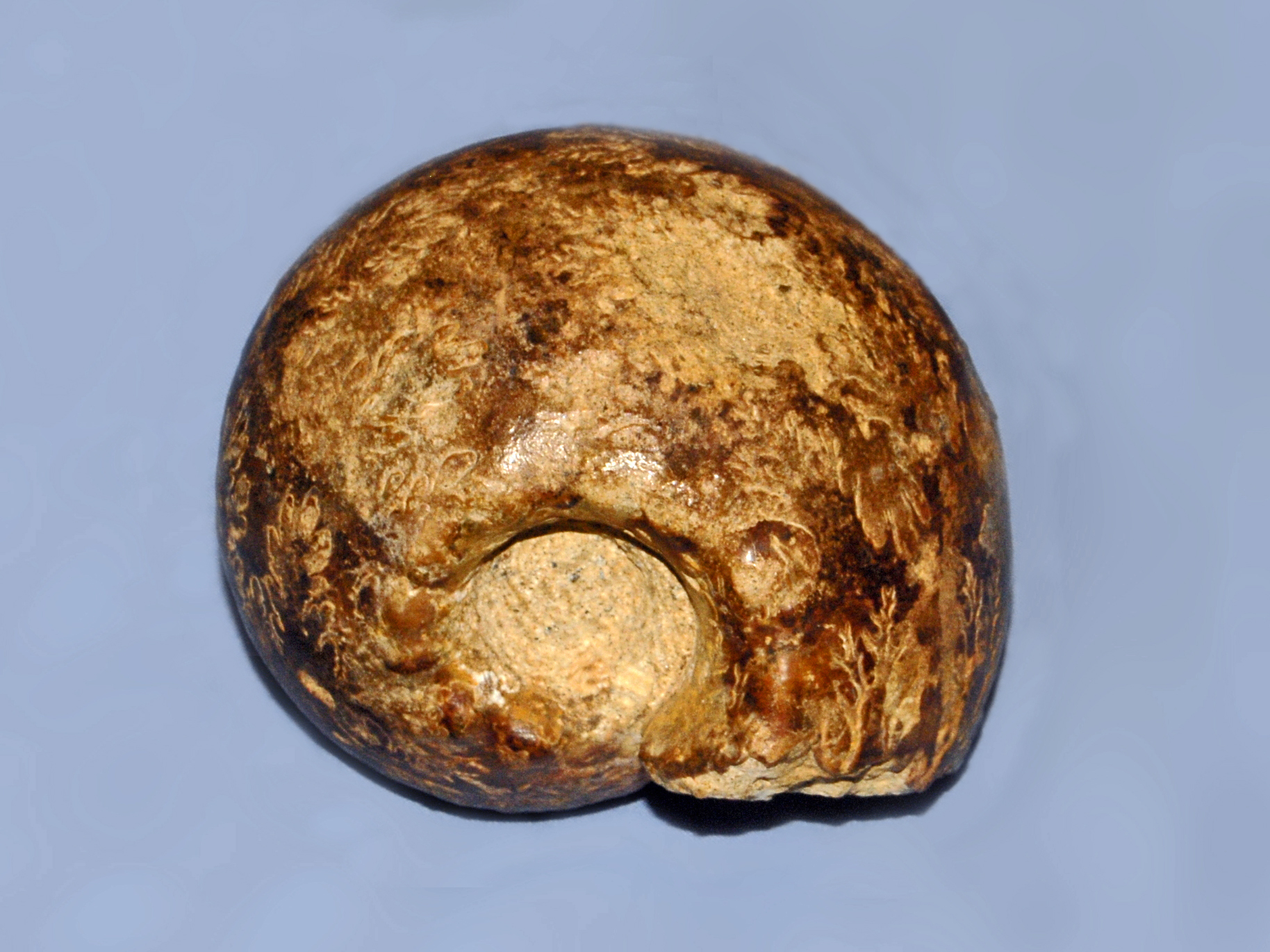
- Fossil of Fagesia rudra from Madagascar. Turonian.

Scientific classification
- Kingdom: Animalia
- Phylum: Mollusca
- Class: Cephalopoda
- Subclass: †Ammonoidea
- Order: †Ammonitida
- Family: †Vascoceratidae
- Genus: †Fagesia
- Species: †F. rudra

Binomial name
- †Fagesia rudra (Stoliczka 1865)

= Fagesia rudra =

Fagesia rudra Temporal range: Turonian

Species of mollusc (fossil)

Fagesia rudra is a small, subglobular ammonite (suborder Ammonitina) belonging to the vascoceratid family. This species lived during the Turonian stage of the late Cretaceous, 92-88 Ma ago.
