= Algericeras =

Algericeras Temporal range: Cenomanian

Scientific classification
- Kingdom: Animalia
- Phylum: Mollusca
- Class: Cephalopoda
- Subclass: †Ammonoidea
- Order: †Ammonitida
- Family: †Brancoceratidae
- Subfamily: †Mortoniceratinae
- Genus: †Algericeras; Spath, 1925

Genus of molluscs (fossil)

Algericeras is an extinct ammonite genus belonging to the superfamily Acanthoceratoidea that lived during the Cenomanian stage at the beginning of the Late Cretaceous in what is now Mexico.

Algericeras is included in the acathoceratacean family Brancoceratidae and subfamily Mortonoceratinae. Species include Algericeras (Sakondryella) remolinense and Algericeras proratum
