= Dipoloceras =

Dipoloceras Temporal range: L Cretaceous (M- U Albian)

Scientific classification
- Kingdom: Animalia
- Phylum: Mollusca
- Class: Cephalopoda
- Subclass: †Ammonoidea
- Order: †Ammonitida
- Family: †Brancoceratidae
- Genus: †Dipoloceras; Hyatt, 1900

Genus of molluscs (fossil)

Dipoloceras is a rather evolute, strongly ribbed and well keeled acanthocerataean ammonite from the Albian stage of the Lower Cretaceous included in the brancoceratid subfamily Mojsisovicziinae. The whorl section is typically inflated or depressed. Ribs are high standing, may be sharp, close to wide spaced. The ventral keel may sit below the level of the ribs.

Dipoloceras is similar to but distinct from Oxytropidoceras in that Oxytropidoceras has a compressed whorl section, high standing keel and lower ribs. Both have more or less typical ammonitic sutures.
