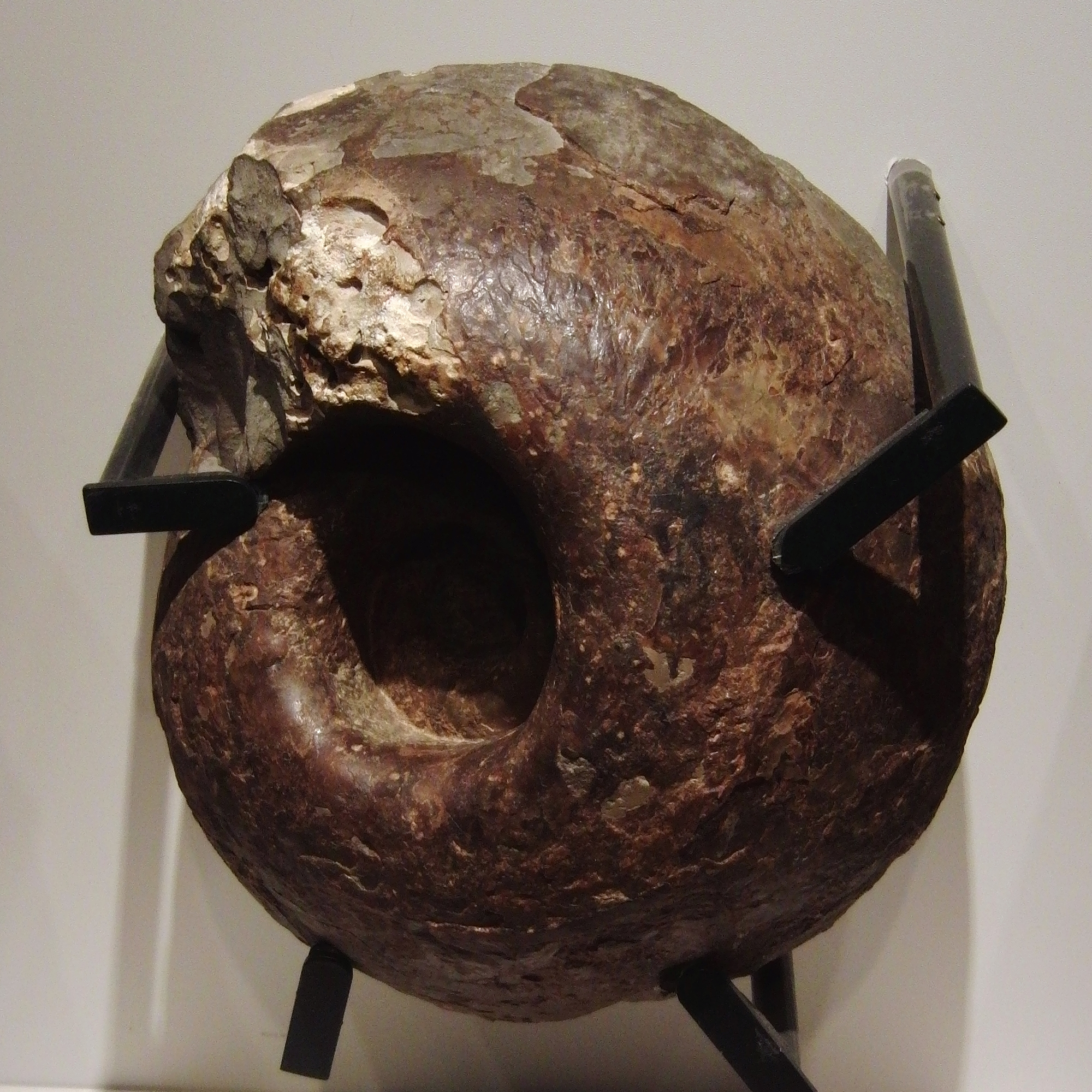
- Fossil of Fagesia spheroidalis from Japan. Late Cretaceous. Exhibit in the National Museum of Nature and Science, Tokyo, Japan

Scientific classification
- Kingdom: Animalia
- Phylum: Mollusca
- Class: Cephalopoda
- Subclass: †Ammonoidea
- Order: †Ammonitida
- Family: †Vascoceratidae
- Genus: †Fagesia; Pervinquière 1907

Species
- See text

= Fagesia =

Fagesia Temporal range: Turonian 92–88 Ma

Genus of molluscs (fossil)

Fagesia is a small, subglobular ammonite (suborder Ammonitina) belonging to the vascoceratid family of the Acanthocerataceae that lived during the Turonian stage of the Late Cretaceous, 92–88 Ma ago.

The shell of Fagesia is about 9.5 cm (3.47 in) in diameter, typically with blunt umbilical tubercles from which spring 2 or three ribs each, but which are lost in the late growth stage. The suture is ammonitic with long spikey lobes and saddles with rounded subelements.

== Species ==
- †Fagesia catinus Mantell 1822 - Loma Gorda Formation, Colombia
- †Fagesia fleuryi Pervinquière 1907
- †Fagesia peroni Pervinquière 1907
- †Fagesia pervinquieri Bose 1920
- †Fagesia rudra Stoliczka 1865
- †Fagesia spheroidalis Pervinquière 1907
- †Fagesia superstes Kossmat 1897
- †Fagesia tevesthensis Peron 1896

== Distribution ==
Fossils of Fagesia have been found in Brazil, Colombia (El Colegio, Cundinamarca, La Frontera (Cundinamarca, Huila and Boyacá), and Loma Gorda Formations, Aipe, Huila), Egypt, France, Mexico, Morocco, Nigeria, Oman, Romania, the Russian Federation, Tunisia, United States (Arizona, California, Colorado, New Mexico, Texas), and Venezuela.
