= Brancoceras =

Brancoceras Temporal range: early to middle Albian

Scientific classification
- Kingdom: Animalia
- Phylum: Mollusca
- Class: Cephalopoda
- Subclass: †Ammonoidea
- Order: †Ammonitida
- Family: †Brancoceratidae
- Subfamily: †Brancoceratinae
- Genus: †Brancoceras; Steinmann, 1881

Species
- See text

Genus of molluscs (fossil)

Brancoceras is a rather small, strongly ribbed, acanthoceratacean ammonite from the Albian stage of the Lower Cretaceous, the shell evolute with a subquadrate whorl section and rounded venter. The suture forms a finely squiggly line with well-defined lobes and saddles. Brancoceras (Eubrancoceras) aegoceratoides reached a diameter of at least 4.2 centimetres (1.7 in).

Brancoceras is representative of the subfamily Brancoceratinae, which makes up part of the acanthoceratacean family Brancoceratidae. Its stratigraphic range is rather narrow, extending only from the upper Lower to the Middle Albian.
