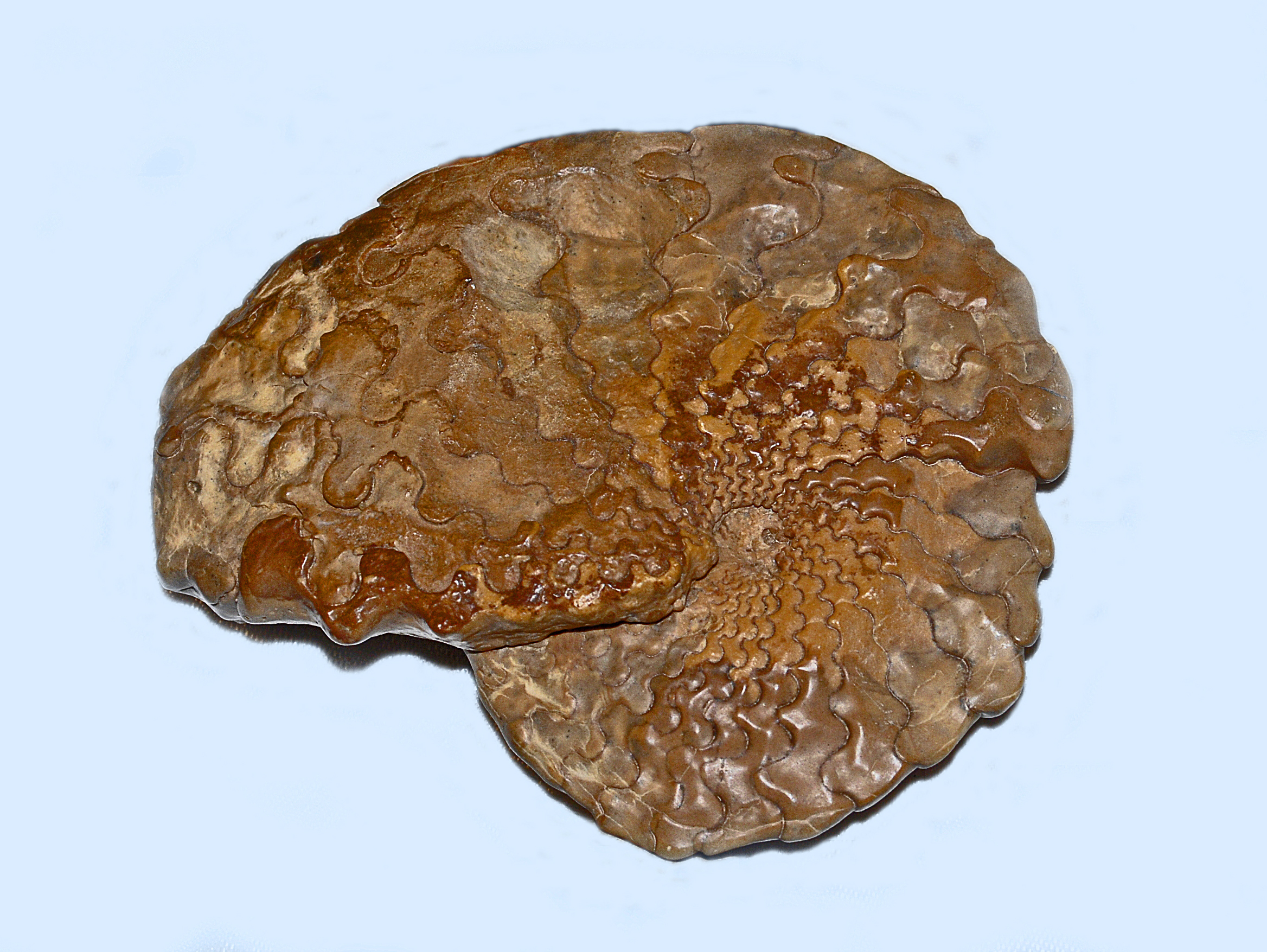
- Fossil of Tissotia species from Wawat in the Sudanese Nubian Desert

Scientific classification
- Kingdom: Animalia
- Phylum: Mollusca
- Class: Cephalopoda
- Subclass: †Ammonoidea
- Order: †Ammonitida
- Superfamily: †Acanthoceratoidea
- Family: †Tissotiidae; Hyatt, 1900

= Tissotiidae =

Tissotiidae Temporal range: U Cretaceous Turonian- Lower Santonian.

Extinct family of ammonites

Tissotiidae is a family of ammonites (Ammonitina) belonging to the Acanthoceratoidea.

The Tissotiidae are derived from the Vascoceratidae, another acanthoceratoid family, and gave rise to the Coilopoceratidae. They have been divided into two subfamilies, the earlier and more primitive Pseudotissotiinae and the more advanced and later Tissotiinae, which differ only in the details of the suture. (ibid)

== Genera ==
Genera within the family Tissotiidae include:

- Heterotissotia Peron, 1897
- Metatissotia
- Paratissotia
- Tissotia Douvillé, 1890
- Tissotioides Reyment, 1958

== Description ==
Members (genera) of the Tissotiidae tend to have smooth, strongly involute shells with deeply impressed inner rims to the whorls where subsequent whorls wrap around those prior. Shells may be narrow and discoidal, broad and subspheroidal, or in between. Sides commonly have broad ribs, and on some, tubercles. The outer rim, known as the venter, may be wide and nearly flat, rounded, or narrow and even sharp. The suture in tissotiids is generally simple, either a simple form of ammonitic or ceratitic with smooth rounded saddles divergent forward and serrate lobes pointing to the rear. (Arkell et al.)
