= Leymeriellidae =

Leymeriellidae Temporal range: Albian

Scientific classification
- Kingdom: Animalia
- Phylum: Mollusca
- Class: Cephalopoda
- Subclass: †Ammonoidea
- Order: †Ammonitida
- Suborder: †Ammonitina
- Superfamily: †Acanthoceratoidea
- Family: †Leymeriellidae; Breistroffer, 1951

Genera
- See text

Extinct family of molluscs

Leymeriellidae is an extinct family of Lower Cretaceous ammonites comprising rather small forms distinguished from Hoplitidae by their flattened and grooved ribs and virtual absence of umbilical tubercles. The family is derived from the Desmoceratidae. Leymeriella schrammeni anterior has evolved from Desmoceras keilhacki keilhacki.

== Taxonomic position ==
Leymeriellidae are currently regarded as belonging to the Acanthoceratoidea, according to W. J. Kennedy et al (1980). The previous placement was in the Hoplitoidea according to W.J. Arkell et al (1957) in the Treatise on Invertebrate Paleontology, Part L.

== Genera ==
Leymeriellidae includes the following genera:

- Leymeriella Jacob 1907. Shell evolute, venter flat to sulcate. Ribs single, wide spaced, grooved in outer part. Lower Albian to Middle Albian
- Proleymeriella Breistroffer 1947. Shell moderately evolute, whorl section oval with constrictions present throughout. Ribs single, strong, form chevrons on a narrowly rounded to acute venter. Lower Albian
- Epileymeriella Breistroffer 1947. Differs from Leymeriella in that the ribs branch from weak umbilical bullae. Lower Albian
