= Flickiidae =

Flickiidae Temporal range: Late Albian -Early Cenomanian

Scientific classification
- Kingdom: Animalia
- Phylum: Mollusca
- Class: Cephalopoda
- Subclass: †Ammonoidea
- Order: †Ammonitida
- Superfamily: †Acanthoceratoidea
- Family: †Flickiidae; Adkins, 1928

Subfamilies
- Flickiinae; Salaziceratinae

Extinct family of ammonites

Flickiidae is a family of dwarf ammonites with little ornament and very simples sutures known from small pyritic specimens found in middle Cretaceous deposits. Inclusion in the Acanthoceratoidea is tentative.

== Taxonomy ==
Flickiidae has been divided into two subfamilies, the Flickiinae, which is equivalent to the Flickiidae of the Treatise on Invertebrate Paleontology, Part L, 1957 and the Salaziceratinae which contains Salaziceras, moved from the Lyelliceratidae and Neosaynoceras, moved from the Acanthoceratidae.

Genera now in the Flickiinae:

Flickia Pervenquiere, 1907 - Shell smooth, moderately evolute, rather compressed, venter narrowly arched, suture smooth, undulatory. U Alb -L Cenom. N Afr, Madag, Texas.
Ficheuria Pervenquiere, 1907 - Shell very involute, globular, umbilical shoulder tending to be angular. Suture similar to that of Flickia. U Alb. -L Cenom. of North Africa.
Adkinsia Boes, 1928 - Shell rather more involute and inflated than Flickia but less than Ficheuria; first lateral lobe narrower than on either. L Cenom, Texas.

Genera placed in the Salaziceratinae:

Salaziceras Breistroffer, 1936 - Described as small, moderately involute, inflated, with more or less straight, course, rounded ribs that arise from prominent umbilical bullae and sutures with simplified saddles. More closely resembles other Lyelliceratid genera except for the suture. U Albian, France.
Neosynoceras Breistroffer, 1947 - A dwarf, involute, globular form with sharp umbilical, ventrolateral, and siphonal (mid ventral) tubercles. L Cenomanian.
