= Henri Schoeller =

French geologist and hydrogeologist

Henri Schoeller (7 August 1899 in Montmorency – 11 March 1988 in Talence) was an influential French geologist and hydrogeologist.

== Early life and education ==
Henri Schoeller studied at the Sorbonne and at the Natural History Museum in Paris. He focussed on the stratigraphy and tectonics of the Paris Basin, then the French Alps in Provence and the Dauphinés. Most of his work was based on many years of geological mapping. By the time he received his doctorate in 1929, Henri Schoeller had published 20 publications, including four French geological maps at a scale of 1 : 50,000, which he introduced in France His doctoral supervisor, Professor Émile Haug, had planned an assistant position for him, but his sudden death disrupted Henri Schoeller's plans for an academic career and he had to pursue a different career. This circumstance was decisive for Henri Schoeller's future scientific direction As a French scholarship holder, he came to the University of Göttingen, Germany, for a year in 1929 and carried out tectonic and stratigraphic fieldwork under Professor Richard Ambronn, who had modern geophysical equipment.

== Academic career ==
He was employed as a geologist by the Sociéte Géophysique de Recherches Minières, for which he worked in Tunisia until 1937. His main task was geological exploration for groundwater extraction, so Henri Schoeller increasingly turned to hydrogeology. He developed new hydrogeological methods, particularly for arid regions.

In 1937, he was appointed to the University of Bordeaux.. In 1942, he left Bordeaux and worked at the headquarters of the Allied forces in Algiers. Initially, he drew up maps of various water points and the navigability of the terrain in Tunisia. Subsequently, as a hydrogeologist for the US Army, he carried out studies for the construction or establishment of airfields in Italy, Yugoslavia, and France.

He returned to Bordeaux on 4 October 1944 and spent the rest of his academic career at the Faculty of Natural Sciences. Henri Schoeller was initially Maître de Conférences there and from 1947 Professor of Geology and Hydrogeology. In 1969, he retired and was appointed honorary professor

=== Legacy ===
Henri Schoeller applied the principle of ion exchange to groundwater and developed a new type of semi-logarithmic diagram to represent the hydrochemical composition of groundwater, the so-called Schoeller diagram, which is one of the most widely used hydrogeological diagrams in literature and practice. In his work, Henri Schoeller always took the view that geology served as the basis for hydrogeology and that the overall hydrogeological situation was of primary importance.

He recognised early on that groundwater would be of great importance worldwide, for which special scientific methods would have to be developed and taught. As this did not seem possible in a normal degree programme, he founded a hydrogeological college at the University of Bordeaux in 1958, where more than 100 hydrogeologists from France and over 30 other countries received post-graduate training. It aimed to teach and implement modern, efficient, and quantitative hydrogeology. This 'Schoeller School' produced over 80 comprehensive dissertations

=== As author ===
Schoeller published the results of his research in over 150 publications, mainly on hydrogeological topics since 1930, but also repeatedly on geological issues. A geological and climatic investigation of the famous Lascaux Cave in the Dordogne led to its closure to tourists at the end of the 1960s, but at the same time to the rescue of the valuable cave paintings. At the age of 60, he learned Russian to make the rich but difficult-to-access Soviet literature available to him. Henri Schoeller's publications were almost exclusively in French and only occasionally in academic journals, which is why his extensive work is difficult to grasp outside France today and his contributions to the development of hydrogeology are easily overlooked. His comprehensive textbook, Les Eaux Souterraines, published in 1962, influenced hydrogeologists worldwide.

== Honors and awards ==
- 1938. Received a prize from the Académie des Sciences for the discovery of graptolites in the metamorphic schist series of the Massif des Maures
- Recipient of the Ordre National du Mérite
- 1979. Received the 'Leopold von Buch plaque' from the German Geological Society.
- 2013. To mark the 25th anniversary of his death, the Comité Français d'Hydrogéologie and the University of Bordeaux honoured him on 30 May 2013 with the unveiling of a commemorative plaque at the university.

== Published works (selection) ==
- La nappe de l'Embrunais au nord de l'Isère – avec quelques observations sur les régions voisines: bord externe dans la nappe du Briançonnais, zone dauphinoise, lambeaux de recouvrement de Sulens (feuille de Bourg-Sainte-Maurice au 50.000e). Bulletin des Services de la Carte Géologique de la France et des opographies Souterraines 175, 1-422 (1929). https://theses.hal.science/tel-00848063
- Les échanges de base dans les eaux souterraines; trois exemples en Tunisie. Bulletin de la Société Géologique de France, 5(4), 389‐420 (1934).
- Utilite de la notion des exchanges de bases pour le comparison des eaux souterraines. Sociéte Géologie Comptes Rendus Sommaire et Bulletin 5, 651-657 (1935).
- Notions sur la corrosion interne des canalisations d'eau. Annales des Ponts et Chaussées 138(2), 199–282 (1938).
- L'hydrogeologie d'une partie de la vallee de la Saoura et du Grand Erg occidental. Bulletin de la Société Géologique de France 15(7-8), 563-585 1945.
- Le régime hydrogéologique des calcaires éocènes du synclinal du Der el Kef (Tunisie). Bulletin de la Société Géologique de France, 18(5), 167‐180 (1948).
- Cours d'hydrogéologie. Ecole Nationale supérieure des Pétroles, Rueil, 364 p. (1949)
- La température des eaux souterraines. Travaux du Laboratoire de Géologie de la Faculté des Sciences de Bordeaux, 182 p. (1949)
- L'iode, le brome et le dans les eaux souterraines et dans les eaux de gisements de pétrole. Angewandte Chemie 66, 85-85 (1954).
- Géochimie des eaux souterraines—aplication aux eaux des gisements de pétrole. Institut Français du Pétrole et Analyses des Combustibles Liquides (1955).
- Les limites septentrionales de l'Eocene du bassin d'Aquitaine. Bulletin de la Société Géologique de France S6-VI (1-3), 211-219 (1956)
- Arid zone hydrology – recent developments. Unseco, Paris, 125 p. (1959)
- Les Eaux Souterraines – Hydrologie, dynamique et chimique – Recherche, exploitation et évaluation des ressources. Masson, Paris, 642 p. (1962)
- Influence du climat, de la température sur la teneur en HCO_{3}^{−} et H_{2}CO_{3} des eaux souterraines. Journal of Hydrology 46(3-4), 365-376 (1980)
