= Flickia =

Flickia Temporal range: Albian

Scientific classification
- Kingdom: Animalia
- Phylum: Mollusca
- Class: Cephalopoda
- Subclass: †Ammonoidea
- Order: †Ammonitida
- Family: †Flickiidae
- Subfamily: †Flickiinae
- Genus: †Flickia; Pervenquiere, 1907

Type species
- Flickia simplex

Other species
- Flickia costellata; Flickia quadrata

Genus of molluscs (fossil)

Flickia is an ammonite genus from the Upper Albian stage of the Early Cretaceous.

== Description ==
Flickia is a very small ammonite. Its shell varied in shape from subevolute to subinvolute. It was narrow, smooth, and had a rounded venter. Despite belonging to the most advanced order of ammonites, its suture was more similar to that of Goniatites and other primitive ammonites.
