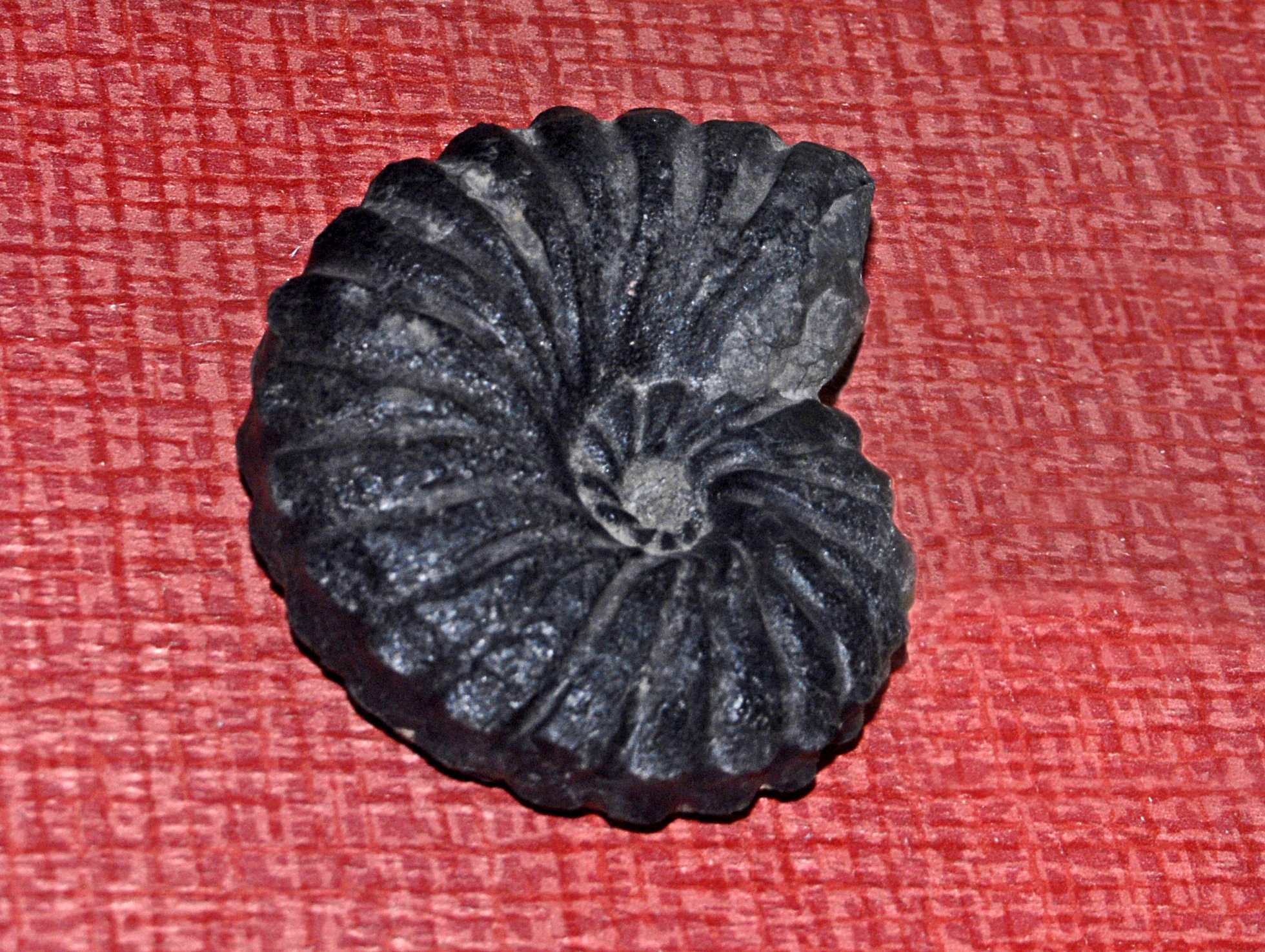
- Fossil shell of Heinzia colleti from Colombia, on display at Galerie de paléontologie et d'anatomie comparée in Paris

Scientific classification
- Kingdom: Animalia
- Phylum: Mollusca
- Class: Cephalopoda
- Subclass: †Ammonoidea
- Order: †Ammonitida
- Family: †Pulchelliidae
- Genus: †Heinzia; Sayn, 1890

= Heinzia =

Heinzia Temporal range: Cretaceous (Barremian age), 130.0–125.45 Ma

Genus of molluscs (fossil)

Heinzia is an extinct ammonoid cephalopod genus belonging to the family Pulchelliidae. They lived during the Cretaceous, in the Barremian age.

== Distribution ==
Fossils of species within this genus have been found in the Cretaceous sediments of Colombia, France, Italy, Morocco and Spain.
