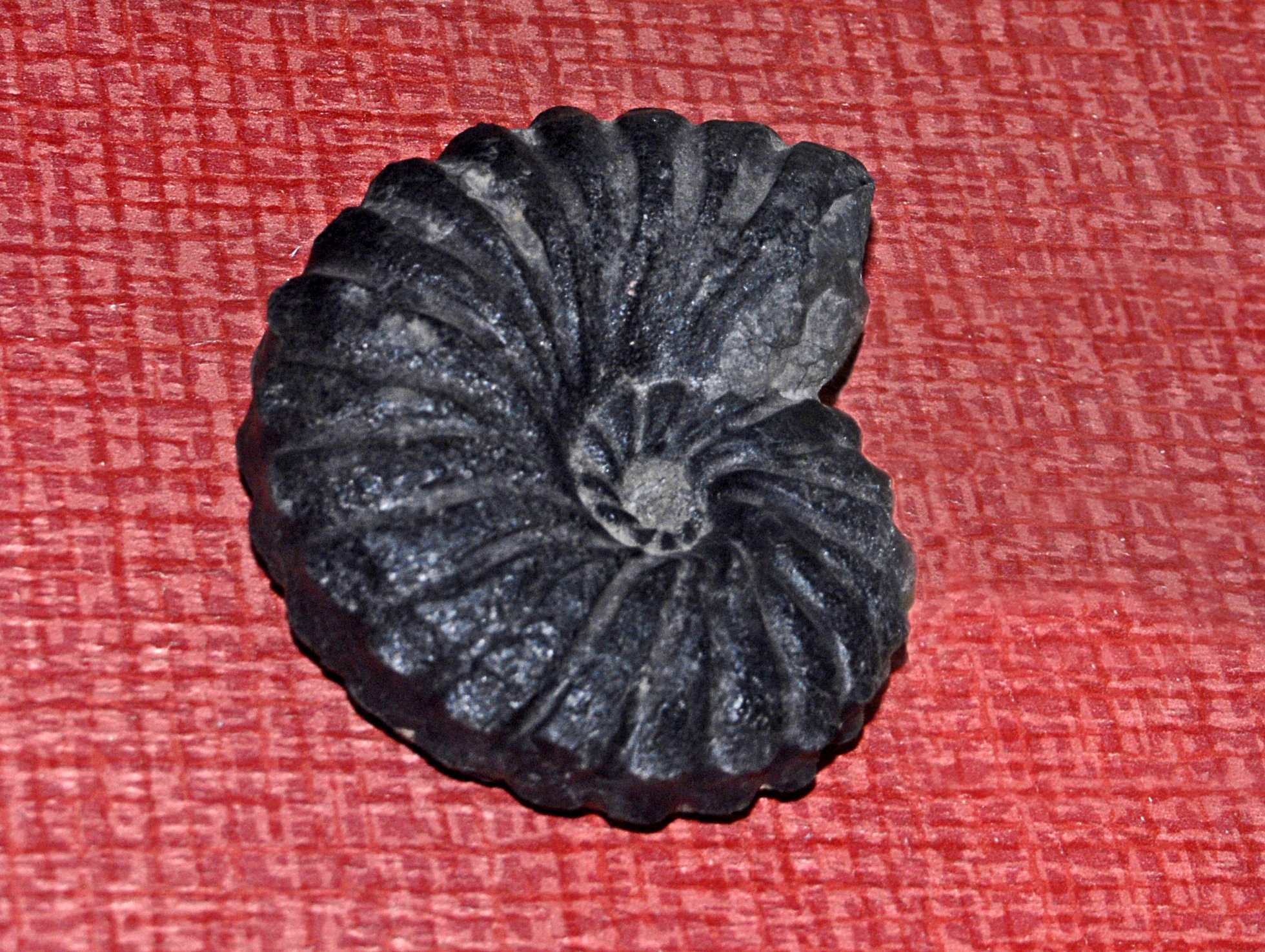
- Fossil shell of Heinzia colleti from Colombia, on display at Galerie de paléontologie et d'anatomie comparée in Paris

Scientific classification
- Kingdom: Animalia
- Phylum: Mollusca
- Class: Cephalopoda
- Subclass: †Ammonoidea
- Order: †Ammonitida
- Superfamily: †Endemoceratoidea
- Family: †Pulchelliidae; Hyatt, 1903

= Pulchelliidae =

Pulchelliidae Temporal range: Cretaceous (Barremian age), 136.4–125.45 Ma

Family of molluscs (fossil)

Pulchelliidae is an extinct ammonoid cephalopod family. It was previously classified as belonging to the superfamily Endemoceratoidea. They lived during the Cretaceous, in the Barremian age.

== Subfamilies and genera ==
- Buergliceratinae
- Psilotissotiinae
- Pulchelliinae (Vermeulen 1995)
  - Nicklesia (Hyatt)
  - Pulchellia (Uhlid)
  - Gerhardtia (Hyatt)
  - Coronites (Hyatt)
  - Curiolites (Vermeulen)
  - Heinzia (Sayn)

== Distribution ==
Fossils of species within this genus have been found in the Cretaceous sediments of Bulgaria, Colombia, France, Mexico, Morocco, Spain, Trinidad and Tobago.
