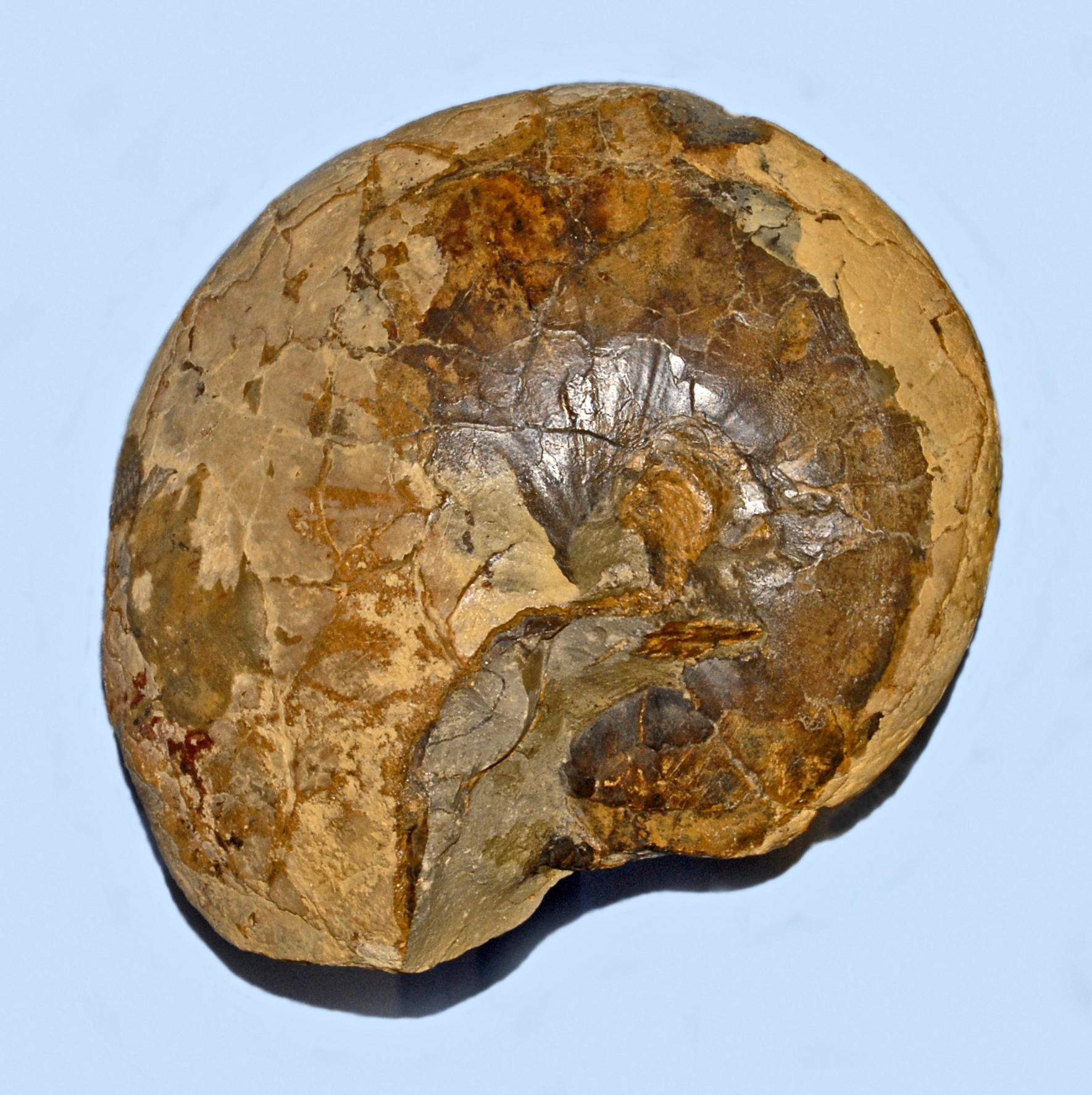
- Fossil of Tissotia species from Peru

Scientific classification
- Kingdom: Animalia
- Phylum: Mollusca
- Class: Cephalopoda
- Subclass: †Ammonoidea
- Order: †Ammonitida
- Family: †Tissotiidae
- Genus: †Tissotia; Douvillé, 1890

= Tissotia =

Tissotia Temporal range: Cretaceous

Genus of molluscs (fossil)

Tissotia is a genus of ammonites belonging to the family Tissotiidae.

These fast-moving nektonic carnivores lived in the Cretaceous period (89.3 to 84.9 Ma). Shells of Tissotia species can reach a diameter of 20 centimetres (7.9 in).

== Species ==
Species within the genus Tissotia include:

- Tissotia fourneli Bayle, 1849
- Tissotia halli Knechtel, 1947
- Tissotia hedbergi Benavides-Caceres, 1956
- Tissotia steinmanni Lissón, 1908

== Distribution ==
Fossils of the species within this genus have been found in the Cretaceous sediments of Brazil, Cameroon, Egypt, France, Nigeria, Peru and Spain.
