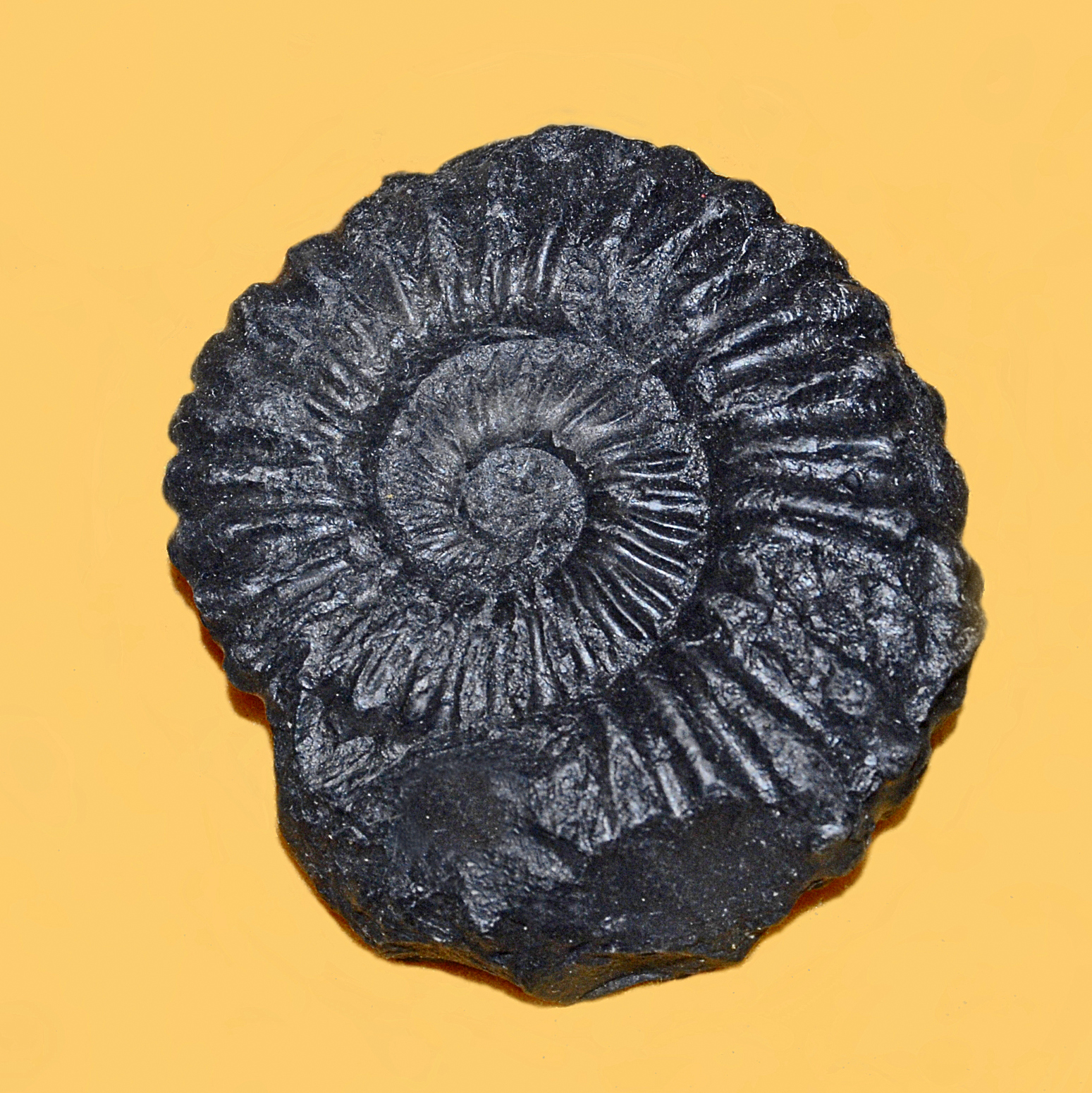
- Fossil of Lyelliceras lyelli from Peru

Scientific classification
- Kingdom: Animalia
- Phylum: Mollusca
- Class: Cephalopoda
- Subclass: †Ammonoidea
- Order: †Ammonitida
- Family: †Lyelliceratidae
- Genus: †Lyelliceras; Spath, 1921

Species
- See text

= Lyelliceras =

Lyelliceras Temporal range: Albian ~109.0–99.7 Ma

Genus of molluscs (fossil)

Lyelliceras is a genus of ammonites belonging to the family Lyelliceratidae. These cephalopods were fast-moving nektonic carnivores. They lived in the Cretaceous period, Albian stage (109.0 to 99.7 Ma).

== Etymology ==
The genus has been named after geologist Charles Lyell.

== Description ==
Shells of Lyelliceras species can reach a diameter of about 50 millimetres (2.0 in). They are moderately to very evolute. The section of the whorls is slightly compressed or circular, with straight radial ribs.

== Species ==
The following species have been recognised:

- Lyelliceras escragnollensis Kennedy, 2011
- Lyelliceras latili Kennedy and Klinger, 2008
- Lyelliceras lyelli (d'Orbigny, 1841)
- Lyelliceras pseudolyelli Parona and Bonarelli, 1897
- Lyelliceras vaasti Destombes et al., 1973

== Distribution ==
Fossils of species within this genus have been found in the Cretaceous sediments of Colombia (Hiló Formation, Tolima), France, Madagascar, Mexico, Peru, South Africa, United Kingdom, United States and Venezuela.
