= Endemoceratoidea =

Scientific classification
- Kingdom: Animalia
- Phylum: Mollusca
- Class: Cephalopoda
- Subclass: †Ammonoidea
- Order: †Ammonitida
- Suborder: †Ammonitina
- Superfamily: †Endemoceratoidea; Schindewolf, 1966

Superfamily of molluscs (fossil)

Endemoceratoidea is a superfamily of true ammonites (suborder Ammonitina).

== Taxonomy ==
Families included in the Endemoceratoidea are:

- Endemoceratidae
- Neocomitidae
- Pulchelliidae
