= Zuluscaphites =

Scientific classification
- Kingdom: Animalia
- Phylum: Mollusca
- Class: Cephalopoda
- Subclass: †Ammonoidea
- Order: †Ammonitida
- Family: †Lyelliceratidae
- Genus: †Zuluscaphites van Hoepen, 1955

Genus of molluscs (fossil)

Zuluscaphites is an extinct genus of cephalopod belonging to the Ammonite subclass.
