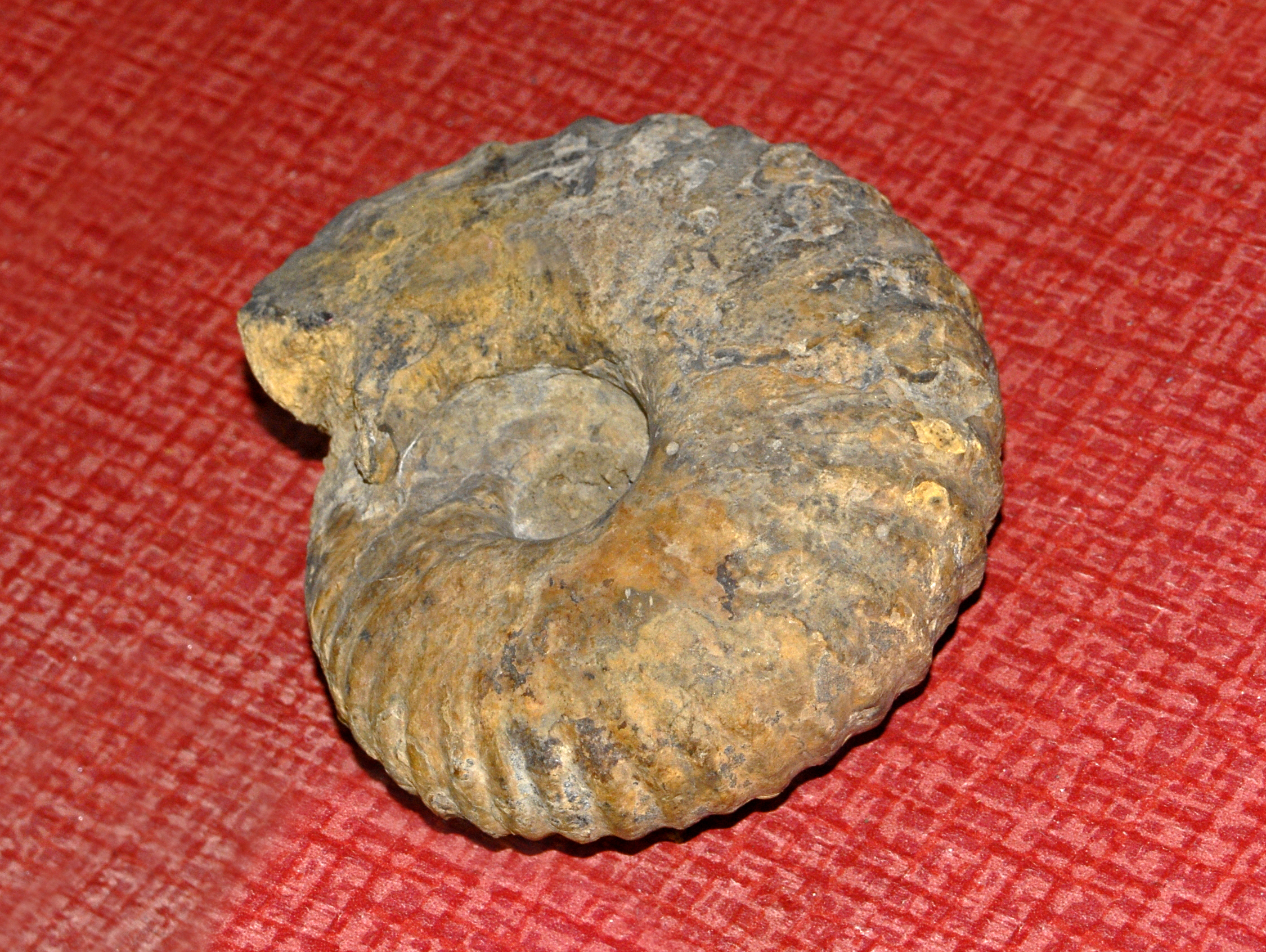
- Fossil shell of Vascoceras cauvini from Nigeria, on display at Galerie de paléontologie et d'anatomie comparée in Paris

Scientific classification
- Kingdom: Animalia
- Phylum: Mollusca
- Class: Cephalopoda
- Subclass: †Ammonoidea
- Order: †Ammonitida
- Family: †Vascoceratidae
- Genus: †Vascoceras; Choffat 1898

Species
- See text

Synonyms
- Broggiiceras Benavides-Caceres 1956; Greenhornoceras Cobban and Scott 1972; Pachyvascoceras Furon 1935; Paravascoceras Furon 1935; Provascoceras Cooper 1979; Vascoceras (Greenhornoceras) Cobban and Scott 1972; Vascoceras (Pachyvascoceras) Furon 1935

= Vascoceras =

Vascoceras Temporal range: Cenomanian-Turonian ~99.7–89.3 Ma

Genus of molluscs (fossil)

Vascoceras is an extinct genus of Cretaceous ammonites included in the family Vascoceratidae. These fast-moving nektonic carnivores lived in the Cretaceous period from the late Cenomanian to the early Turonian. The type species of the genus is Vascoceras gamai from Portugal.

== Species ==
The following species of Vascoceras have been described:

- V. humboldti
- V. olssoni
- V. angermanni
- V. cauvini
- V. hartti
- V. birchbyi
- V. durandi
- V. gamai
- V. proprium
- V. silvanense
- V. venezolanum

== Distribution ==
The type species was first described in Portugal. Fossils of species within this genus have been found in the Cretaceous sediments of Angola, Brazil, Colombia (La Frontera Formation), Egypt, France, Mexico, Nigeria, Oman, Peru, Tunisia, United States and Venezuela.
