= Adkinsia =

Adkinsia Temporal range: Cenomanian

Scientific classification
- Kingdom: Animalia
- Phylum: Mollusca
- Class: Cephalopoda
- Subclass: †Ammonoidea
- Order: †Ammonitida
- Family: †Flickiidae
- Subfamily: †Flickiinae
- Genus: †Adkinsia; Boes, 1928

Genus of molluscs (fossil)

Adkinsia is an extinct genus of cephalopod belonging to the Ammonite subclass.
