= Maurice A. F. Breistroffer =

French paleontologist and botanist

Maurice Andrè Frantz Breistroffer (15 July 1910, Paris – 17 February 1986, Grenoble) was a French paleontologist and botanist.

He worked as a curator at the natural history museum in Grenoble. He was recognized as a leading authority in the study of ammonites, of which, he circumscribed numerous taxa; e.g. the families Oosterellidae (1940) and Leymeriellidae (1951). As a botanist, he conducted investigations of plants native to southeastern France. He described Scilla litardierei (amethyst meadow squill) and dozens of other botanical species. Taxa with the specific epithet of breistrofferi commemorate his name. In the field of entomology, he studied Coleoptera species found in the department of Drôme.

== Selected works ==
- Supplément au Catalogue des Plantes vasculaires de la Drôme in Procès-Verbaux de la Société dauphinoise d'Etudes Biologiques, (1937-1941).
- Supplément au Catalogue des Plantes vasculaires des Basses-Alpes, (1946-1951).
- Sur une nouvelle station de plantes relictuelles dans les Baronnies (Basses-Alpes), (1946).
- Sur les zones d'ammonites dans l'albien de France et d'Angleterre, (1947).
- "Cretaceous ammonites from western Venezuela", 1949 (in English; with A N C Ten Broek and R W Barker).
- Rapport sur les ammonites du Barremien de la Colombie, (1951).
- Supplément au Catalogue des Plantes vasculaires de l'Ardèche, (1954-1960).
- Sisteron et les Alpes de Lumière, 1969 (with Gérard Guy Aymonin).
- Etude de l'étage albien dans le massif de la Chartreuse : (Isère et Savoie).
- Sur quelques plantes "steppo-continentales" rares et critiques du Sud-Est de la France, (1970).
