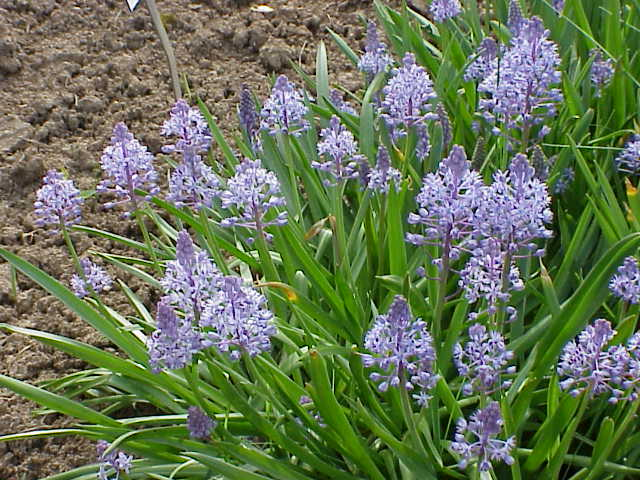

Conservation status
- Near Threatened (IUCN 3.1)

Scientific classification
- Kingdom: Plantae
- Clade: Embryophytes
- Clade: Tracheophytes
- Clade: Angiosperms
- Clade: Monocots
- Order: Asparagales
- Family: Asparagaceae
- Subfamily: Scilloideae
- Genus: Scilla
- Species: S. litardierei

Binomial name
- Scilla litardierei Breistr. (1954)

Synonyms
- Chouardia litardierei (Breistr.) Speta; Nectaroscilla litardierei (Breistr.) Trávn.; Scilla amethystina Vis.; Scilla italica Host; Scilla pratensis Waldst. & Kit.

= Scilla litardierei =

Species of flowering plant

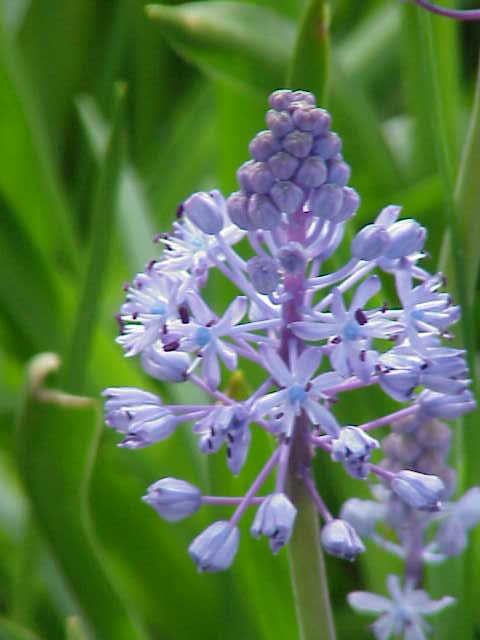
Scilla litardierei flowers

Scilla litardierei, the amethyst meadow squill or Dalmatian scilla, is a species of flowering plant in the family Asparagaceae. A bulbous perennial, with blue grape-hyacinth like flowers, blooming in late spring, much later than the more popular Siberian squill and later than Muscari which it resembles.

== Description ==
Scilla litardierei has 3–6 grass-like leaves, 3-8mm wide, tapering to a point. Up to 70 blue-violet flower buds are borne on each stem in a dense raceme, opening into star-shaped flowers, 15–20 cm high. Preferring partial shade, it will naturalise and spread in favourable conditions.

== Habitat ==
It originates in the western Balkans (hence Dalmatian scilla), and in its original habitat in Slovenia it is considered an endangered species, flowering in May–June.

== Taxonomy ==
The exact taxonomic circumscription of the genus Scilla and related genera has proven very difficult, as noted by Stedje in 2001. "The definition of genera and the assignment of species to genera within the family Hyacinthaceae or subfamily Scilleae of the family Liliaceae, have troubled taxonomists since Linnaeus. The group is poor in qualitative characters, which has made it difficult to define stable genera based on good diagnostic characters. Species have often been moved from genus to genus either due to different opinions on generic delimitation or to misinterpretation of characters." Previously placed within the family Liliaceae, Scilla was subsequently reclassified as Asparaginaceae (subfamily Scilloideae, tribe Hyacintheae, subtribe Hyacinthinae).

Based on DNA sequence studies, the Austrian botanist Franz Speta had proposed to re-ascribe this species into a separate genus, Chouardia, within the Hyacintheae (1998). However, the accepted and preferred name is Scilla litardierei. The synonyms Scilla amethystina Fish., Scilla pratensis Waldst. & Kit., Scilla italica Host and Scilla nutans Alsch. are no longer valid.

== Cultivation ==
It was introduced to Britain in 1827. It has become much more easily available since 2004. In cultivation in the UK Scilla litardierei has gained the Royal Horticultural Society's Award of Garden Merit. It is hardy down to −20 °C (−4 °F).

== See also ==
- List of Scilla species

== Bibliography ==
=== Articles ===
- Angiosperm Phylogeny Group IV (2016). "An update of the Angiosperm Phylogeny Group classification for the orders and families of flowering plants: APG IV". Botanical Journal of the Linnean Society. 181 (1): 1–20. doi:10.1111/boj.12385.
- Pfosser, Martin; Speta, Franz (1999). "Phylogenetics of Hyacinthaceae Based on Plastid DNA Sequences". Annals of the Missouri Botanical Garden. 86 (4): 852–875. doi:10.2307/2666172.
- Stedje, Brita (2001). "Generic Delimitation of Hyacinthaceae, with Special Emphasis on Sub-Saharan Genera". Systematics and Geography of Plants. 71 (2): 449–454. doi:10.2307/3668693.

=== Databases ===
- "Scilla litardierei". Germplasm Resources Information Network. Agricultural Research Service, United States Department of Agriculture.
- Royal Horticultural Society

=== Websites ===
- Alpine Garden Society
- Tesselaar: Scilla 'Amethyst Meadow Squill'
