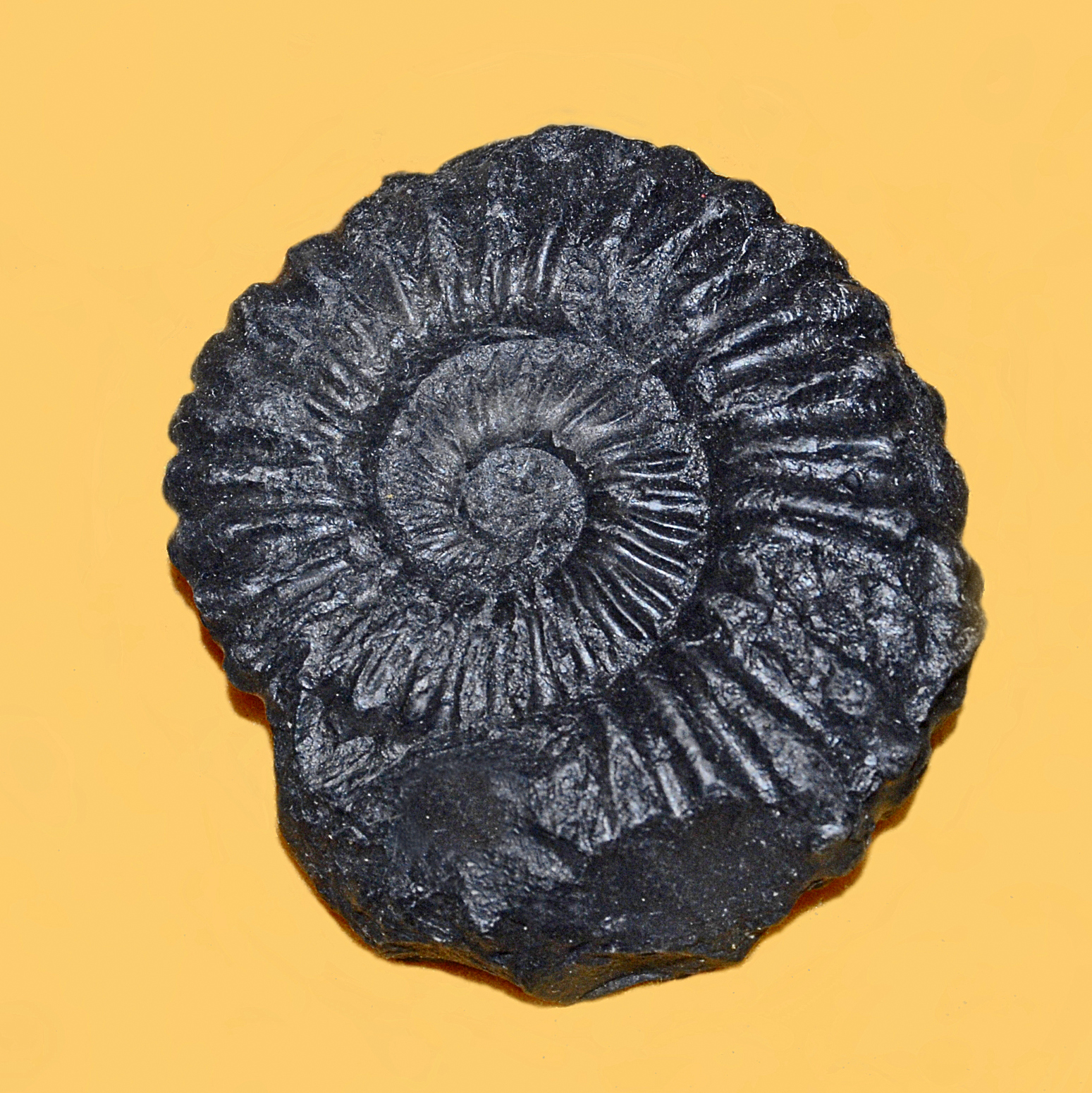
- Fossil of Lyelliceras lyelli

Scientific classification
- Kingdom: Animalia
- Phylum: Mollusca
- Class: Cephalopoda
- Subclass: †Ammonoidea
- Order: †Ammonitida
- Superfamily: †Acanthoceratoidea
- Family: †Lyelliceratidae; Spath, 1921

= Lyelliceratidae =

Lyelliceratidae Temporal range: Cretaceous

Extinct family of ammonites

Lyelliceratidae is a family of ammonites belonging to the superfamily Acanthoceratoidea.

These cephalopods were fast-moving nektonic carnivores. They lived in the Cretaceous period (109.0 to 94.3 Ma).

== Genera ==
- Lyelliceras Spath, 1921
- Pseudobrancoceras Kennedy, 2004
- Tegoceras Hyatt, 1903
- Budaiceras Böse, 1928
- Cenisella Delamette and Latil, 1989
- Neophlycticeras Spath, 1922
- Ojinagiceras Cobban and Kennedy, 1989
- Paracalycoceras
- Stoliczkaia Neumayr, 1875
- Zuluscaphites Van Hoepen, 1955
