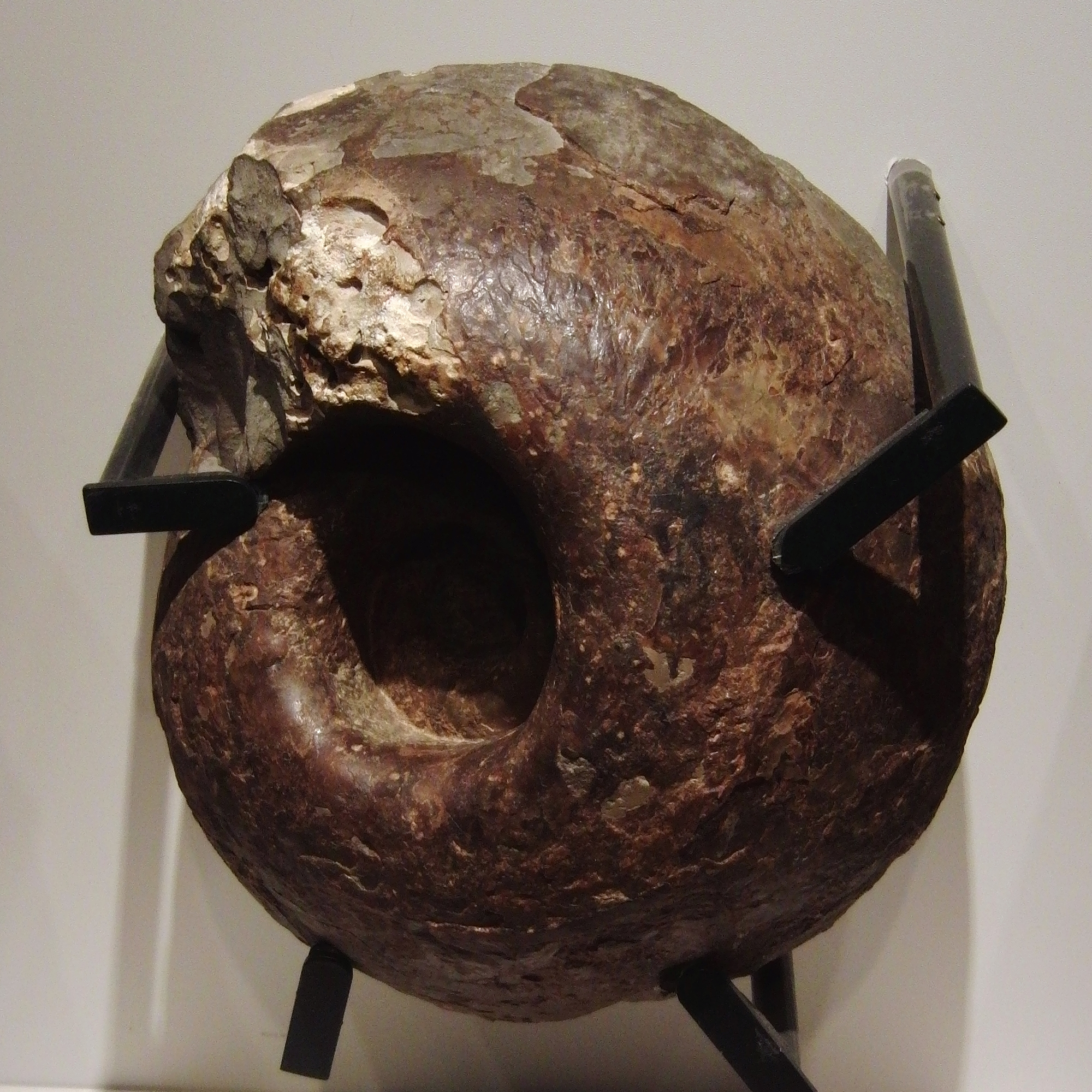
- Fossil of Fagesia spheroidalis from Japan. Late Cretaceous. Exhibit in the National Museum of Nature and Science, Tokyo, Japan.

Scientific classification
- Kingdom: Animalia
- Phylum: Mollusca
- Class: Cephalopoda
- Subclass: †Ammonoidea
- Order: †Ammonitida
- Superfamily: †Acanthoceratoidea
- Family: †Vascoceratidae; Spath, 1925

= Vascoceratidae =

Vascoceratidae Temporal range: U Cretaceous (l-m Turonian)

Extinct family of ammonites

Vascoceratidae is a family of Upper Cretaceous ammonites in the superfamily Acanthoceratoidea characterized by shells that are either smooth or bluntly tuberculate, or have sparse, coarse ribs. Sutural elements are shallow, irregular, and slightly indented, or deep and very indented. Whorl section and degree of involution vary, even within species.

Vascoceratidae is a short lived family restricted to the early and middle Turonian stage. Its duration, no more than a few million years. They are derived from the Acanthoceratidae and are the predecessors of the Tissotiidae, which in turn gave rise to the Coilopoceratidae; all taking place in a short time span in the Turonian.

There are 11 genera assigned to this family:

- Ezilloella Reyment, 1954
- Fagesia Pervinquière, 1907
- Gombeoceras Reyment, 1954
- Hemitissotia Péron, 1897
- Infabricaticeras Cobban, Hook & Kennedy, 1989
- Microdiphasoceras Cobban, Hook & Kennedy, 1989
- Nannovascoceras Renz & Alvarez, 1979
- Paramammites Furon, 1935
- Pseudoneoptychites Leanza, 1967
- Rubroceras Cobban, Hook & Kennedy, 1989
- Vascoceras Choffat, 1898
