= Léon Pervinquière =

Léon Pervinquière (14 August 1873 in La Roche-sur-Yon – 11 May 1913) was a French geologist and paleontologist. He was Chef des Travaux Pratiques de Géologie at the Sorbonne in Paris. He was also seen as a geographer.

Pervinquière is remembered for his extensive geological studies of Tunisia, which first took place in 1896. He also conducted important paleontological research of the region that included studies of Mesozoic cephalopods as well as investigations of Cretaceous gastropods and pelecypods.

In 1911 he took part in an expedition to define the border between Tunisia and Tripolitania. On this mission he performed geological and geographical studies. The third part of Philippe Thomas's Essai d'une description géologique de la Tunisie, which was to have described the Tertiary formations, was completed and published by his friend, Léon Pervinquière. Émile Haug published the Essai d'une description géologique de la Tunisie after Pervinquiere had also died, and presented it to the Geological Society of France in session on 6 April 1914.

The ammonite species Fagesia pervinquieri is named after him.

== Written works ==
- Étude géologique de la Tunisie centrale, (1903) - Geological study of central Tunisia.
- Études de paléontologie tunisienne 1, Céphalopodes des terrains secondaires, (1907) - Studies of Tunisian paleontology I, cephalopods of secondary formations.
- Le Sud Tunisien, (1909) - Southern Tunisia
- Rapport sur une mission scientifique dans l'extrême-sud tunisien (frontière tuniso tripolitaine), (1912) - Discussion on the scientific mission to extreme southern Tunisia (Frontier Tunisia-Tripolitania).
- Études de paléontologie tunisienne 2, Gastropodes et lamellibranches des terrains crétacés, (1912) - Studies of Tunisian paleontology II, Cretaceous gastropods and lamellibranchs.
- La Tripolitaine interdite. Ghadamès 1912.

== Sources ==
- Blayac, J. (1913), "Léon Pervinquière", Annales de Géographie, 22 (124): 372–374
- Burollet, Pierre F. (21 June 1995), "L'exploration de la Tunisie avant la première guerre mondiale", Travaux du Comitée français d'Histoire de la Géologie (in French), 9 (3), Comité Français d'Histoire de la Géologie (COFRHIGEO) (séance du 21 juin 1995)
- Cilleuls, Jean des (1969), A propos des phosphates de Tunisie et de leur découverte par Philippe THOMAS, vétérinaire militaire I1843-1910) (PDF) (in French)
