= Brancoceratidae =

Brancoceratidae Temporal range: Early Albian - Early Cenomanian

Scientific classification
- Kingdom: Animalia
- Phylum: Mollusca
- Class: Cephalopoda
- Subclass: †Ammonoidea
- Order: †Ammonitida
- Superfamily: †Acanthoceratoidea
- Family: †Brancoceratidae; Spath, 1933

Subfamilies
- Brancoceratinae; Mojsisovicziinae; Mortoniceratinae

Extinct family of ammonites

Brancoceratidae is a family of acanthoceratoid ammonites from the middle of the Cretaceous, recognized by their commonly evolute shells with round, oval, or quadrate whorls, strong ribs, usual ventral keels, and at least, umblical tubercles. The family is thought to be derived from the Desmoceratidae (Desmoceratoidea), perhaps from Silesitoides or some allied genus.

== Subfamilies ==
The Brancoceratidae are divided into three subfamilies, described as follows.

Brancoceratinae Spath, 1933: Generally small, evolute with round, oval, square or rectangular whorl sections. The venter may be sharp on the inner whorls, a feature which disappears on the later. Ribs are strong and rounded, and commonly cross over the venter. Sutures are simple, pseudoceratitc in some. The subfamily lived from during the Albian.

Mojsisovicziinae Hatt, 1903: derived from the Broncoceratinae, beginning with Mojsisoviczia, in which the keel has become a stable character, in some appearing only early, in others appearing only late. There are two main stocks, one of high-whorled compressed forms which left no descendants, the other, more evolute with round or square whorl sections, which gave rise to the Mortoniceratinae. Both stocks have their origin in Mojsisociczia. Mojsisovicziinae genera lived from the Middle to Late Albian.

Mortoniceratinae Spath, 1925: Moderately involute to very evolute brancoceratids with more or less rounded, square, or compressed whorls; low or high keels and ribs that branch, at last on the early whorls but may be single on the body chamber or even earlier. Ribs are low and round, or flat, to high and round, but never high and sharp. Tubercles, typically present, may number as many as five per rib. The suture is generally with squarish, symmetrical, deeply and sharply indented saddles. Mortoniceratinae genera are the youngest in age living from the late Middle Albian to the Early Cenomanian in the Late Cretaceous.
