= Émile Haug =

French geologist and paleontologist

Gustave Émile Haug
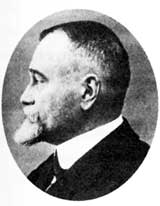
- Gustave Émile Haug
- Born: 19 June 1861; Drusenheim
- Died: 28 August 1927 (aged 66); Niederbronn
- Known for: geosyncline theory
- Scientific career
- Fields: Geology

Gustave Émile Haug (19 June 1861 - 28 August 1927) was a French geologist and paleontologist known for his contribution to the geosyncline theory.

== Career ==
Émile Haug was born on 19 June 1861. In 1884 he received his doctorate in natural sciences from the University of Strasbourg with a dissertation on the ammonite genus Harpoceras, titled "Beiträge zu einer monographie der Ammonitengattung Harpoceras". In 1897 he became maître de conférences at the Sorbonne in Paris, where in 1904 he was named a full professor of geology. In 1902 he was appointed president of the Société géologique de France, and from 1917 to 1927, was a member of the Académie des sciences.

The third part of Philippe Thomas's Essai d'une description géologique de la Tunisie, which was to have described the Tertiary formations, was completed and published by his friend, Professor Léon Pervinquière (1873–1913), holder of the Chair of Geology at the Faculty of Science in Paris. Émile Haug published the Essai d'une description géologique de la Tunisie after Pervinquiere had also died, and presented it to the Geological Society of France in session on 6 April 1914. Haug died in Niederbronn on 28 August 1927, aged 66.

== Publications ==
Haug's major work, "Traité de géologie", was published in two volumes (1907–11; Vol. I. "Les phénomènes géologiques", Vol. II. "Les périodes géologiques"), with volume II being issued in three parts. He was also the author of:

- "Les géosynclinaux et les aires Continentales", (1900).
- "Les nappes de chariage de la Basse-Provence", (two volumes; 1925, 1930).

== Sources ==
- Burollet, Pierre F. (21 June 1995), "L'exploration de la Tunisie avant la première guerre mondiale", Travaux du Comitée français d'Histoire de la Géologie (in French), 9 (3), Comité Français d'Histoire de la Géologie (COFRHIGEO) (séance du 21 juin 1995)
- Cilleuls, Jean des (1969), A propos des phosphates de Tunisie et de leur découverte par Philippe THOMAS, vétérinaire militaire I1843-1910) (PDF) (in French)
