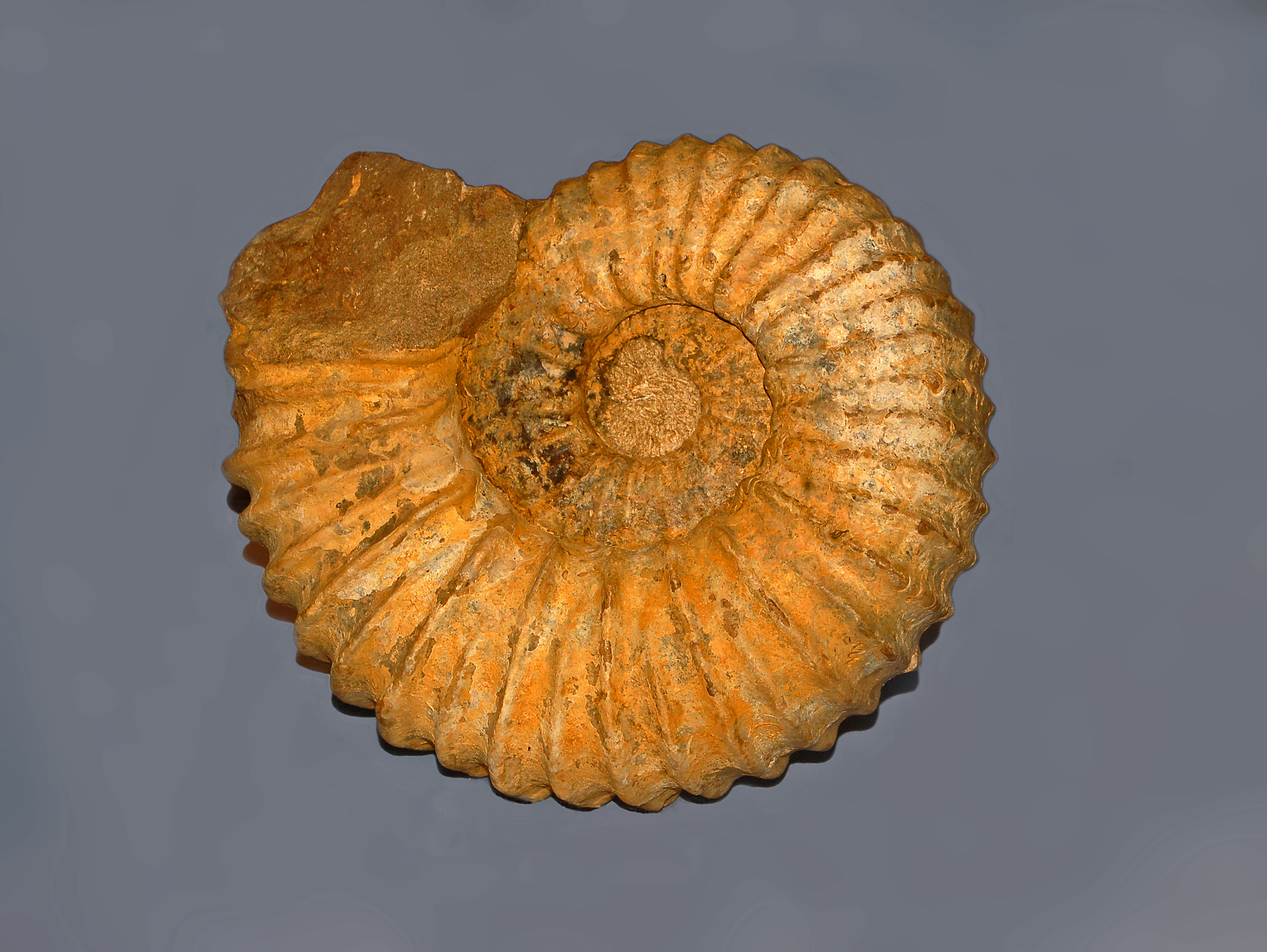
- Mantelliceras tuberculatum

Scientific classification
- Kingdom: Animalia
- Phylum: Mollusca
- Class: Cephalopoda
- Subclass: †Ammonoidea
- Order: †Ammonitida
- Suborder: †Ammonitina
- Superfamily: †Acanthoceratoidea; Hyatt, 1900

Families
- Acanthoceratidae; Brancoceratidae; Cleoniceratidae; Coilopoceratidae; Collignoniceratidae; Flickiidae; Forbesiceratidae; Hystatoceratidae; Leymeriellidae; Lyelliceratidae; Mojsisovicsiidae; Peroniceratidae; Prolyelliceratidae; Pseudotissotidae; Pseudotissotiidae; Sphenodiscidae; Tissotiidae; Vascoceratidae

= Acanthoceratoidea =

Acanthoceratoidea Temporal range: Late Cretaceous–Early Paleocene

Extinct superfamily of molluscs

Acanthoceratoidea, formerly Acanthocerataceae, is a superfamily of Upper Cretaceous ammonoid cephalopods belonging to the order Ammonitida, and comprising some 10 or so families.

== Diagnosis ==
Members of the Acanthoceratoidea are typically strongly ribbed and have a tendency to develop prominent tubercles, although other types including those with oxyconic shells are included.

== Taxonomy ==
Families included in the Acanthoceratoidea are:

- Acanthoceratidae
- Brancoceratidae
- Coilopoceratidae
- Collignoniceratidae
- Flickiidae
- Lyelliceratidae
- Sphenodiscidae
- Tissotiidae
- Vascoceratidae

== Discussion ==
According to Wright Calloman and Howarth, 1996 in the revised version of Part L of the Treatise, the Binneyitidae is replaced by the Forbesiceratidae with the Binneyitidae now in the Hoplitaceae and the Forbesiceratidae included in the Acanthoceratoidea. The Leymeriellidae, based on the Lower Albian genus, Leymeriella, was added, extending the range downward. The name Tissotiidae was replaced by Pseudotissotiidae. The Libycoceratidae, proposed by Zaborski, 1982, for the Upper Campanian - Maastrictian Libycoceras, was split off from the Sphenodiscidae. while the other families remain essentially the same, except for the addition of newer genera.

The replacement of the Tissotiidae by the Pseudotissotiidae in the revised classification of the Acanthoceraticeae in the Treatise (1996) is based on the earlier appearance of the subfamily Psudotissotiinae in the Lower Turonian, followed by the Tissotiinae in the Upper Turonian. Other newer classifications e.g. split the Tissotiidae into two families, the earlier Pseudotissotiidae and the later, revised but smaller, Tissotiidae. Fatmi and Kennedy, 1999, returned Libycoceras, sole genus of the Libycoceratidae, to its original position in the Sphenodicidae, so negating the Libycoceratidae.
