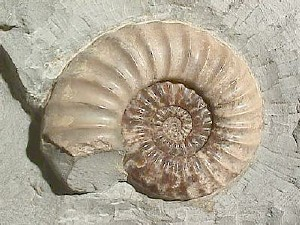
- Asteroceras, a Jurassic ammonite from England

Scientific classification
- Domain: Eukaryota
- Kingdom: Animalia
- Phylum: Mollusca
- Class: Cephalopoda
- Subclass: †Ammonoidea
- Order: †Ammonitida
- Suborder: †Ammonitina; Hyatt, 1889

Superfamilies
- Acanthoceratoidea; Desmoceratoidea; Endemoceratoidea; Eoderoceratoidea; Hammatoceratoidea; Haploceratoidea; Hildoceratoidea; Hoplitoidea; Perisphinctoidea; Psiloceratoidea; Stephanoceratoidea

= Ammonitina =

Ammonitina Temporal range: Jurassic–Cretaceous

Extinct suborder of ammonites

Ammonitina comprises a diverse suborder of ammonite cephalopods that lived during the Jurassic and Cretaceous periods of the Mesozoic Era. They are excellent index fossils, and it is often possible to link the rock layer in which they are found to specific geological time periods.

The shells of Ammonitina are typically planospiral, coiled in a single plane and symmetrical from side to side. They come in various forms, including evolute shells where all whorls are exposed, and strongly involute shells with only the outer whorl visible. Shells may be heavily ribbed, with some featuring nodes and spines, while others are completely smooth. Some shells have broad, rounded venters (the outer rim), while others have a sharp, keel-like venter. Sutures are generally ammonitic, characterized by complex saddle and lobe patterns. However, in some derived forms, the suture pattern becomes simplified, appearing ceratitic or even goniatitic.

The Ammonitina are derived from the Phylloceratina, another ammonitid suborder which has its origin in the Ceratitida of the Triassic. As with the subclass, the closest living relatives of the Ammonitina are the Coleoidea (octopus, squid, and cuttlefish) and not the superficially similar modern Nautilus.

Lower Jurassic superfamilies include the Psiloceratoidea, Eoceroceratoidea, and Hildoceratoidea, which is in part Middle Jurassic. Superfamilies from the Middle and Upper Jurassic include the Stephanoceratoidea, Perisphinctoidea, and Haploceratoidea; the Perisphinctoidea and Haploceratoidea continued well into the Cretaceous. Exclusively Cretaceous superfamilies include the Desmoceratacea, Hoplitoidea, and the Acanthoceratoidea.

The Eoderoceratoidea of the Lower Jurassic gave rise in the middle of the epoch to the Hilderceratidae, which in turn gave rise early in the Middle Jurassic to the Stephanoceratoidea, Perisphinctoidea, and Haploceratoidea. The Psiloceratoidea from the Lower Jurassic stands alone.

The Cretaceous Desmoceratoidea are derived from the Phylloceratina separately from Jurassic forms and give rise to the Hoplitoidea and to the Acanthoceratoidea.
