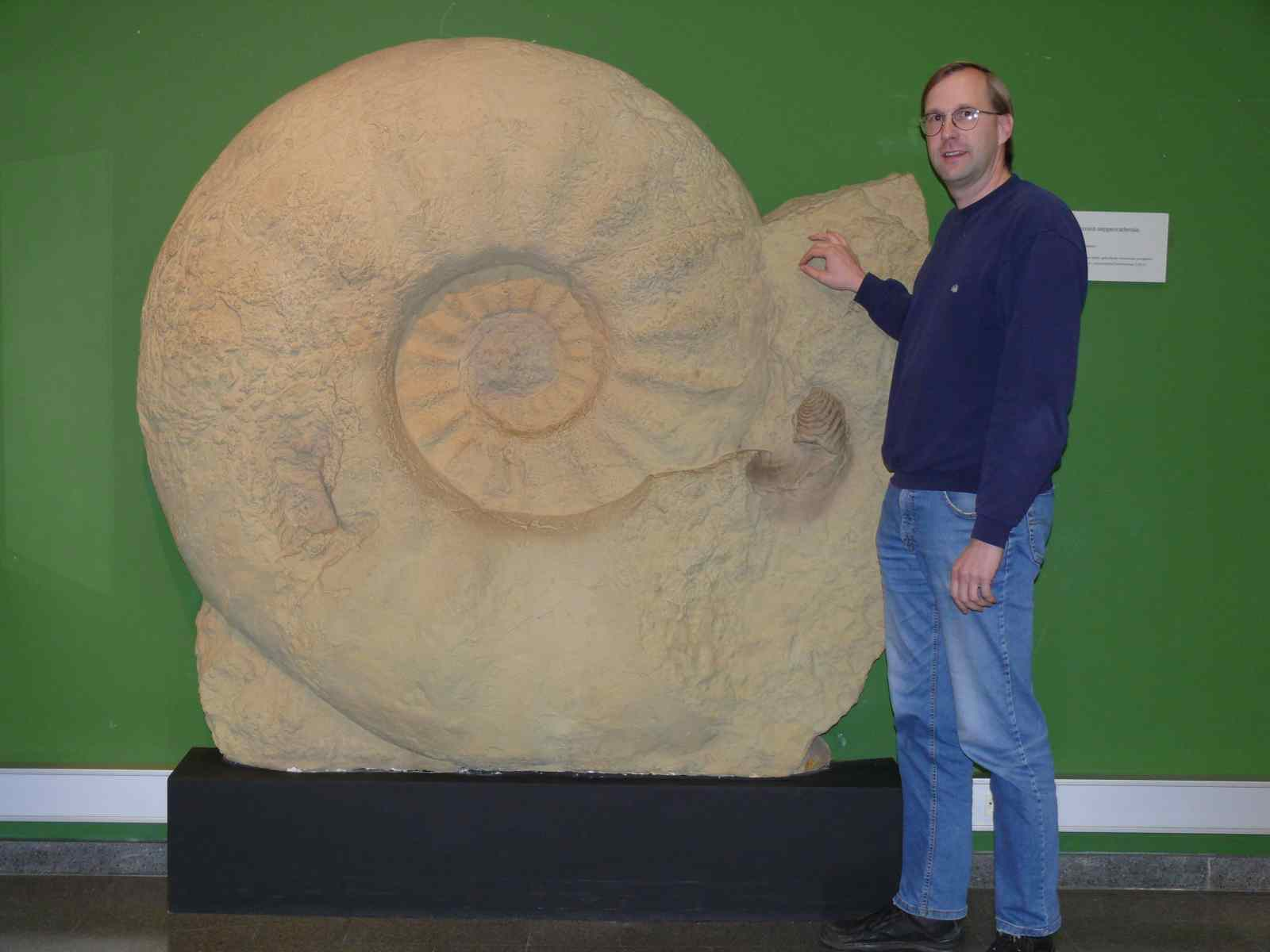
- Parapuzosia seppenradensis

Scientific classification
- Kingdom: Animalia
- Phylum: Mollusca
- Class: Cephalopoda
- Subclass: †Ammonoidea
- Order: †Ammonitida; Hyatt, 1889

Suborders
- Ammonitina; Ancyloceratina; Lytoceratina; Phylloceratina

= Ammonitida =

Ammonitida Temporal range: Jurassic–Danian

Extinct order of molluscs

Ammonitida, or true ammonites, are an order of ammonoid cephalopods that lived from the Jurassic through the end of the Cretaceous, commonly with intricate ammonitic sutures. Ammonitida is a textbook example of a group killed off by the Cretaceous–Paleogene extinction event, although some researchers have argued, controversially, that a small number of populations briefly survived into the earliest Paleocene (Danian) before dying out.

Ammonitida is divided into four suborders, the Phylloceratina, Lytoceratina, Ancyloceratina, and Ammonitina.

The Phylloceratina is the ancestral stock, derived from the Ceratitida near the end of the Triassic. The Phylloceratina gave rise to the Lytoceratina near the beginning of the Jurassic which in turn gave rise to the highly specialized Ancyloceratina near the end of the Jurassic. Both the Phylloceratina and Lytoceratina gave rise to various stocks combined in the Ammonitina.

These four suborders are further divided into different stocks, comprising various families combined into superfamilies. Some like the Hildoceratoidea and Stephanoceratoidea are restricted to the Jurassic. Others like the Hoplitoidea and Acanthoceratoidea are known only from the Cretaceous. Still others like the Perisphinctoidea are found in both.
